= Mexican Americans =

Americans of Mexican ancestry

Mexicano-estadounidenses
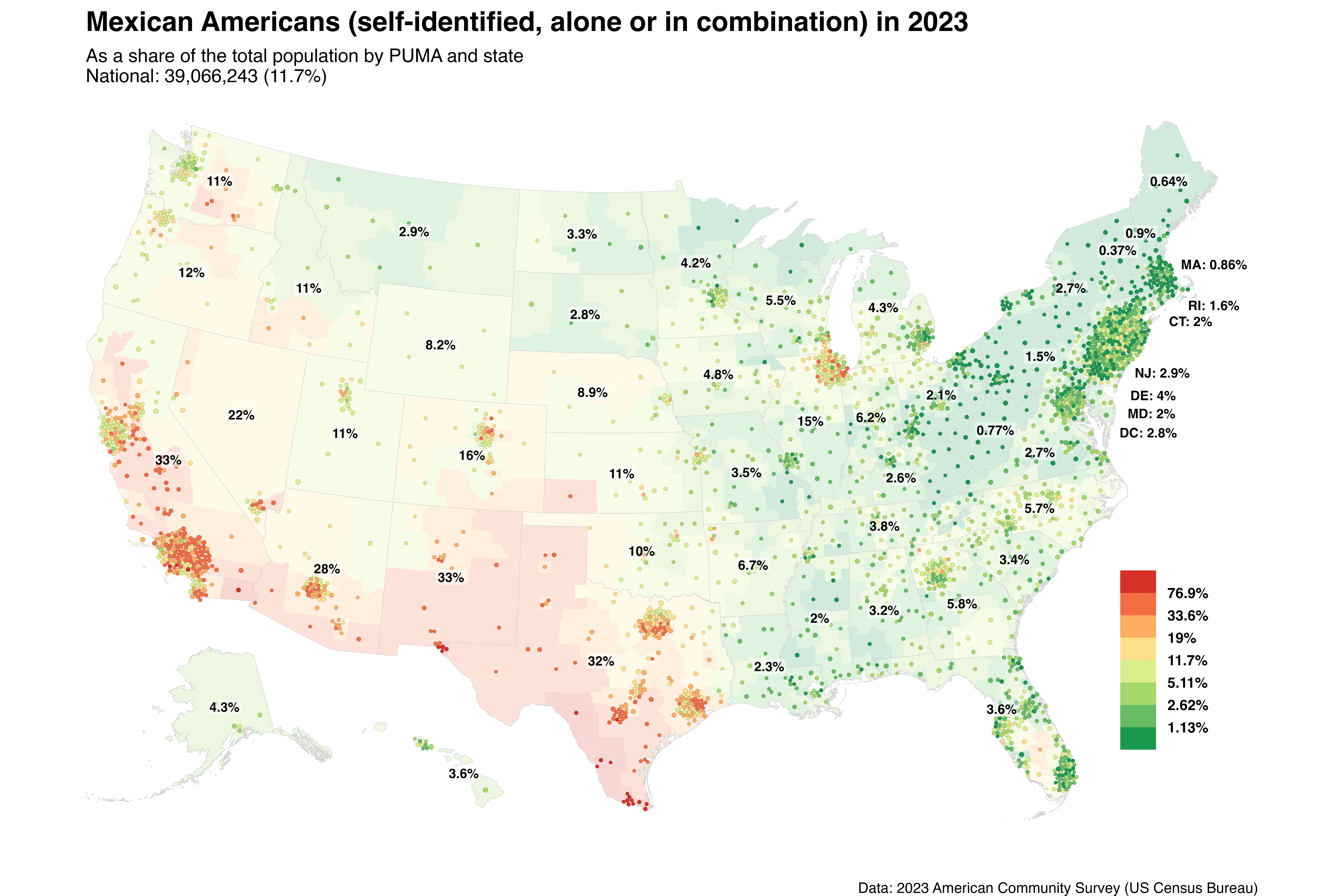
- Percent of population of Mexican descent in 2023

Total population
- 10,918,205 (by birth, 2021); 37,991,500 (by ancestry, 2023); 11.3% of the U.S. population (2023)

Regions with significant populations
- California (Los Angeles; Bay Area; San Diego; Inland Empire; Central Valley; Salinas Valley); Texas (El Paso; Houston; DFW; San Antonio; Austin; Rio Grande Valley); Southwestern United States (Arizona; New Mexico; Las Vegas Valley); Illinois (Chicago area; Southern Illinois); Wisconsin; Colorado; Oklahoma; Northwestern United States (especially Eastern Washington and Salem, OR); New York (New York City area; Western New York); Also growing/emerging populations in: Southeast (Delaware; Maryland; Virginia; North Carolina; Georgia; Florida; Kentucky; Arkansas); Northeast (Massachusetts; Pennsylvania)

Languages
- Mexican Spanish; American English; Spanglish; Indigenous Mexican languages; US Spanish; Chicano English; Caló

Religion
- Majority; Catholicism, Irreligion; Minority; Protestantism, Evangelical Christianity, Jehovah's Witnesses, Aztec religion, Judaism.

Related ethnic groups
- Hispanos (Californios, Neomexicanos, Tejanos, Floridanos), Chicanos, Afro-Mexicans, White Mexicans, Blaxicans, Native Mexicans, Arab Mexicans, Hispanic Americans, Filipino Americans, Indian Americans, Chinese Americans, Japanese Americans, Korean Americans, Native Americans

Mexican Americans are Americans by Mexican citizenship or Mexican descent. In 2024, Mexican Americans made up 11.56% of the US population and 57.32% of all Hispanic Americans, with a number of 38,990,058 people. In 2019, 71% of Mexican Americans were born in the United States. Mexicans born outside the US make up 53% of the total population of foreign-born Hispanic Americans and 25% of the total foreign-born population. Chicano is a term used by some to describe the unique identity held by Mexican-Americans. The United States is home to the second-largest Mexican community in the world (24% of the entire Mexican-origin population of the world), behind only Mexico.

Most Mexican American reside in the Southwest, with more than 60% of Mexican Americans living in the states of California and Texas. Most Mexicans Americans are non-Indigenous, but have varying degrees of Indigenous and European ancestry, with the latter being of mostly Spanish origins. Those of Indigenous ancestry descend from one or more of the over 60 Indigenous groups in Mexico (approximately 200,000 people in California alone).

It is estimated that approximately 10% of the current Mexican-American population are descended from residents of the Spanish Empire and later Mexico, which preceded the acquisition of their territories by the United States; such groups include New Mexican Hispanos, Tejanos of Texas, and Californios. They became US citizens in 1848 through the Treaty of Guadalupe Hidalgo, which ended the Mexican–American War. Mexicans living in the United States after the treaty was signed were forced to choose between keeping their Mexican citizenship or becoming a US citizen. Few chose to leave their homes, despite the changes in national government. The majority of these Hispanophone populations eventually adopted English as their first language and became Americanized. Also called Hispanos, these descendants of independent Mexico from the early-to-middle 19th century differentiate themselves culturally from the population of Mexican Americans whose ancestors arrived in the American Southwest after the Mexican Revolution. The number of Mexican immigrants in the United States has sharply risen in recent decades.

== History ==
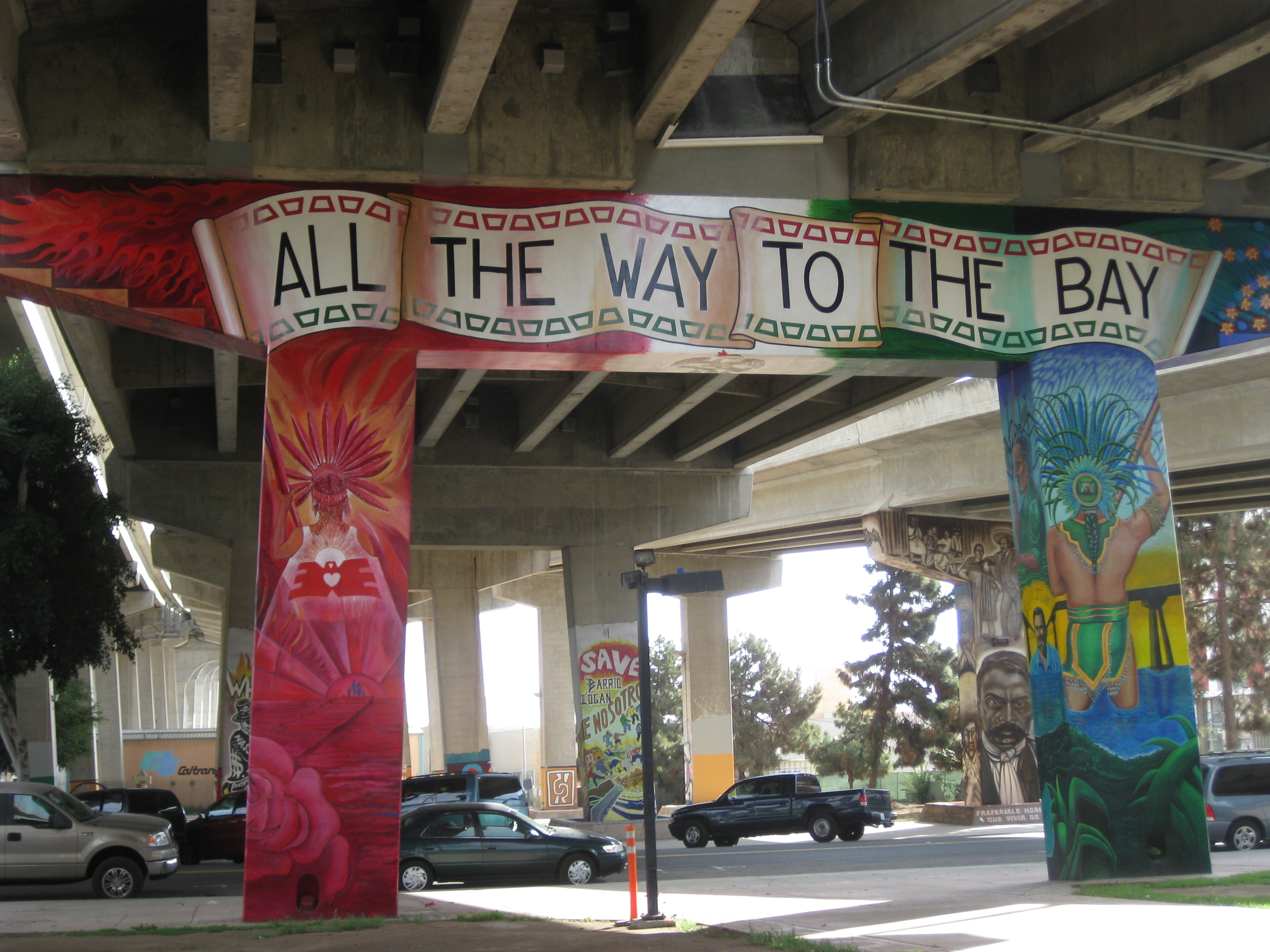
Mural in Chicano Park, San Diego, stating "All the way to the Bay"

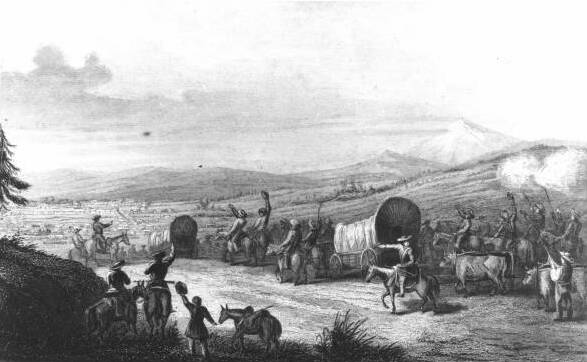
Arrival of the caravan at Santa Fe the Santa Fe Trail, lithograph published c. 1844

In 1900, there were slightly more than 500,000 Hispanics of Mexican Descent living in New Mexico, Arizona, Nevada, Colorado, California, and Texas. Most were Mestizo Mexican Americans of Spanish and Indigenous descent, Spanish settlers, other Hispanicized European settlers who settled in the Southwest during Spanish colonial times, as well as local and Mexican Amerindians.

As early as 1813, some of the Tejanos who colonized Texas in the Spanish Colonial Period established a government in San Antonio, Texas, that desired independence from Spanish-ruled Mexico. In those days, there was no concept of identity as Mexican. Many Mexicans were more loyal to their states/provinces than to their country as a whole, which was a Viceroyalty and part of Spain. This was particularly true in frontier regions such as Zacatecas, Texas, Yucatán, Oaxaca, New Mexico, etc.

As shown by the writings of colonial Tejanos such as Antonio Menchaca, the Texas Revolution was initially a colonial Tejano cause. Mexico encouraged immigration from the United States to settle east Texas and, by 1831, English-speaking settlers outnumbered Tejanos ten to one in the region. Both groups were settled mostly in the eastern part of the territory. The Mexican government became concerned about the increasing volume of Anglo-American immigration and restricted the number of settlers from the United States allowed to enter Texas. As researcher Jorge Majfud explains in The Wild Frontier: 200 Years of Anglo-Saxon Fanaticism in Latin America, the core of the conflict lay not in cultural differences (which did not prevent the United States from seizing the western states), but in slavery—which Mexico had outlawed.

Consistent with its abolition of slavery, the Mexican government banned slavery within the state, which angered American slave owners. The American settlers, along with many of the Tejano, rebelled against the centralized authority of Mexico City and the Santa Anna regime, while other Tejano remained loyal to Mexico, and still others were neutral.

Author John P. Schmal wrote of the effect Texas independence had on the Tejano community:

A native of San Antonio, Juan Seguín is probably the most famous Tejano to be involved in the War of Texas Independence. His story is complex because he joined the Anglo rebels and helped defeat the Mexican forces of Santa Anna. But later on, as Mayor of San Antonio, he and other Tejano felt the hostile encroachments of the growing Anglo power against them. After receiving a series of death threats, Seguín relocated his family in Mexico. He was coerced into military service and fought against the US in 1846–1848 Mexican–American War.

Although the events of 1836 led to independence for the people of Texas, the Latino population of the state was quickly disenfranchised, to the extent that their political representation in the Texas State Legislature disappeared entirely for several decades.

As a Spanish colony, the territory of California also had an established population of colonial settlers. Californios is the term for the Spanish-speaking residents of modern-day California; they were the original Mexicans (regardless of race) and local Hispanicized Amerindians in the region (Alta California) before the United States acquired it as a territory. In the mid-19th century, more settlers from the United States began to enter the territory.

In California, Mexican settlement had begun in 1769 with the establishment of the Presidio and Catholic mission of San Diego. 20 more missions were established along the California coast by 1823, along with military Presidios and civilian communities. Settlers in California tended to stay close to the coast and outside the California interior. The California economy was based on agriculture and livestock. In contrast to central New Spain, coastal colonists found little mineral wealth. Some became farmers or ranchers, working for themselves on their own land or for other colonists. Government officials, priests, soldiers, and artisans settled in towns, missions, and presidios.

One of the most important events in the history of Mexican settlers in California occurred in 1833, when the Mexican Government secularized the missions. In effect this meant that the government took control of large and vast areas of land. The government eventually distributed these lands among the elite of the population in the form of Ranchos, which soon became the basic socio-economic units of the province.

Relations between Californios and English-speaking settlers were relatively good until 1846, when military officer John C. Fremont arrived in Alta California with a United States force of 60 men on an exploratory expedition. Fremont made an agreement with Comandante Castro that he would stay in the San Joaquin Valley only for the winter, then move north to Oregon. However, Fremont remained in the Santa Clara Valley then headed towards Monterey. When Castro demanded that Fremont leave Alta California, Fremont rode to Gavilan Peak, raised a US flag and vowed to fight to the last man to defend it. After three days of tension, Fremont retreated to Oregon without a shot being fired.

With relations between Californios and Americans quickly souring, Fremont returned to Alta California, where he encouraged European-American settlers to seize a group of Castro's soldiers and their horses. Another group seized the Presidio of Sonoma and captured Mariano Vallejo.

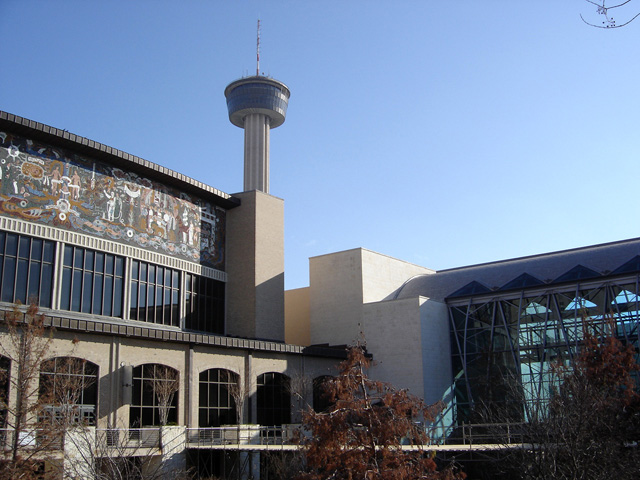
The Henry B. González Convention Center and Lila Cockrell Theater along the San Antonio River Walk. The Tower of the Americas is visible in the background.

The Americans chose William B. Ide as Commander in Chief and on July 5, 1846, he proclaimed the creation of the Bear Flag Republic. On July 9, US military forces reached Sonoma; they lowered the Bear Flag Republic's flag, replacing it with a US flag. Californios organized an army to defend themselves from invading American forces after the Mexican army retreated from Alta California to defend other parts of Mexico.

The Californios defeated an American force in Los Angeles on September 30, 1846. In turn, they were defeated after the Americans reinforced their forces in what is now southern California. Tens of thousands of miners and associated people arrived during the California gold rush, and their activities in some areas meant the end of the Californios' ranching lifestyle. Many of the English-speaking 49ers turned from mining to farming and moved, often illegally, onto land granted to Californios by the former Mexican government.

The United States had first come into conflict with Mexico in the 1830s, as the westward spread of United States settlements and of slavery brought significant numbers of new settlers into the region known as Tejas (modern-day Texas), then part of Mexico. The Mexican–American War, followed by the Treaty of Guadalupe Hidalgo in 1848 and the Gadsden Purchase in 1853, extended US control over a wide range of territory once held by Mexico, including the present-day borders of Texas and the states of New Mexico, Colorado, Utah, Nevada, Arizona and California.

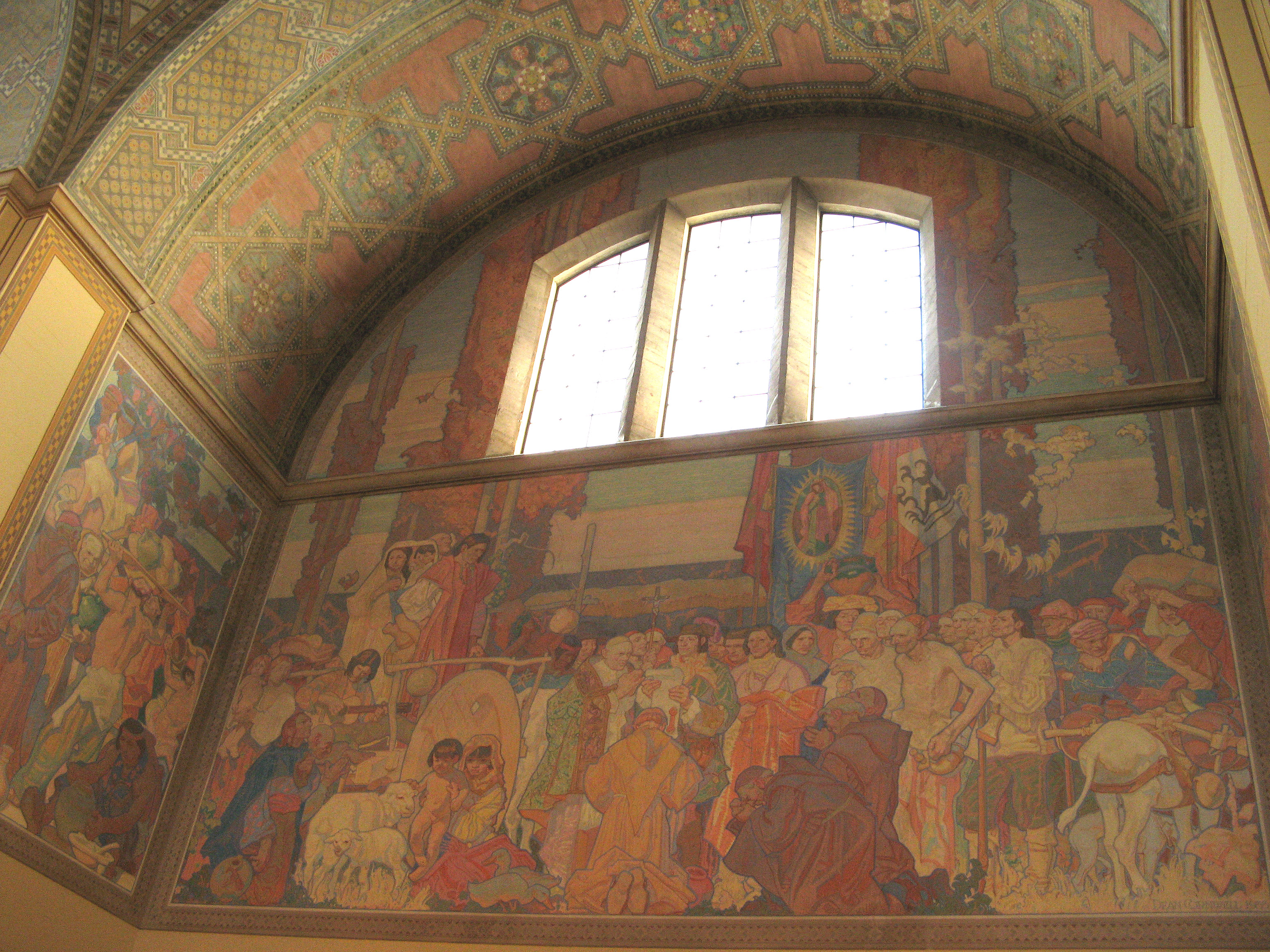
An example of a Chicano-themed mural in the Richard Riordan Central Library

Although the treaty promised that the landowners in this newly acquired territory would have their property rights preserved and protected as if they were citizens of the United States, many former citizens of Mexico lost their land in lawsuits before state and federal courts over terms of land grants, or as a result of legislation passed after the treaty. Even those statutes which Congress passed to protect the owners of property at the time of the extension of the United States' borders, such as the 1851 California Land Act, had the effect of dispossessing Californio owners. They were ruined by the cost over years of having to maintain litigation to support their land titles.

Following the concession of California to the United States under the Treaty of Guadalupe Hidalgo, Mexicans were repeatedly targeted by legislation that targeted their socio-economic standing in the area. One significant instance of this is exemplified by the passage of legislation that placed the heaviest tax burden on land. The fact that there was such a heavy tax on land was important to the socio-economic standing of Mexican Americans, because it essentially limited their ability to retain possession of the Ranchos that had been originally granted to them by the Mexican government.

=== 19th-century and Early 20th-century Mexican migration ===
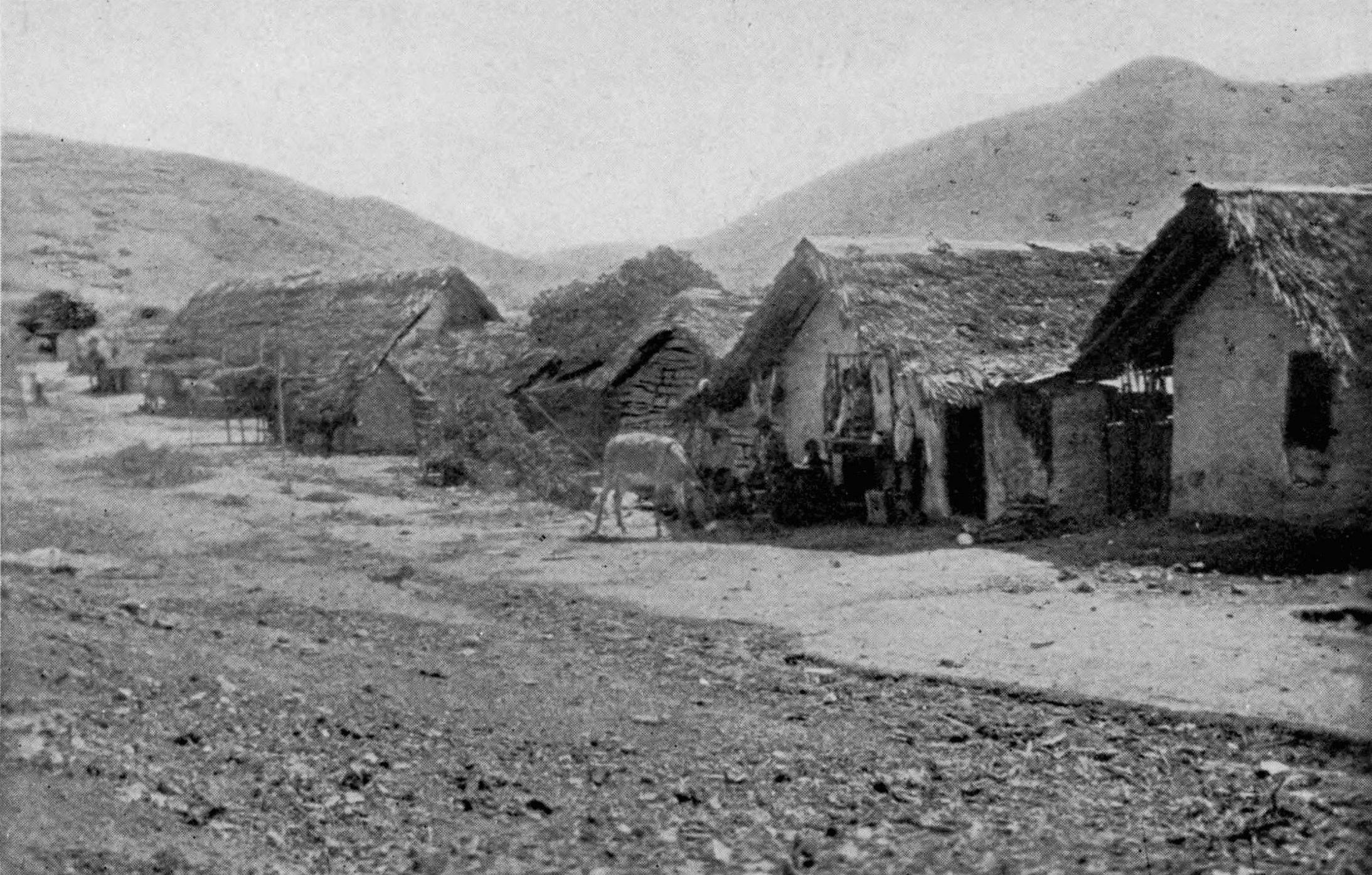
The first Mexican braceros arrived in California in 1917.

In the late nineteenth century, liberal Mexican president Porfirio Díaz embarked on a program of economic modernization that triggered not only a wave of internal migration in Mexico from rural areas to cities, but also Mexican emigration to the United States. A railway network was constructed that connected central Mexico to the US border and also opened up previously isolated regions. The second factor was the shift in land tenure that left Mexican peasants without title or access to land for farming on their own account.

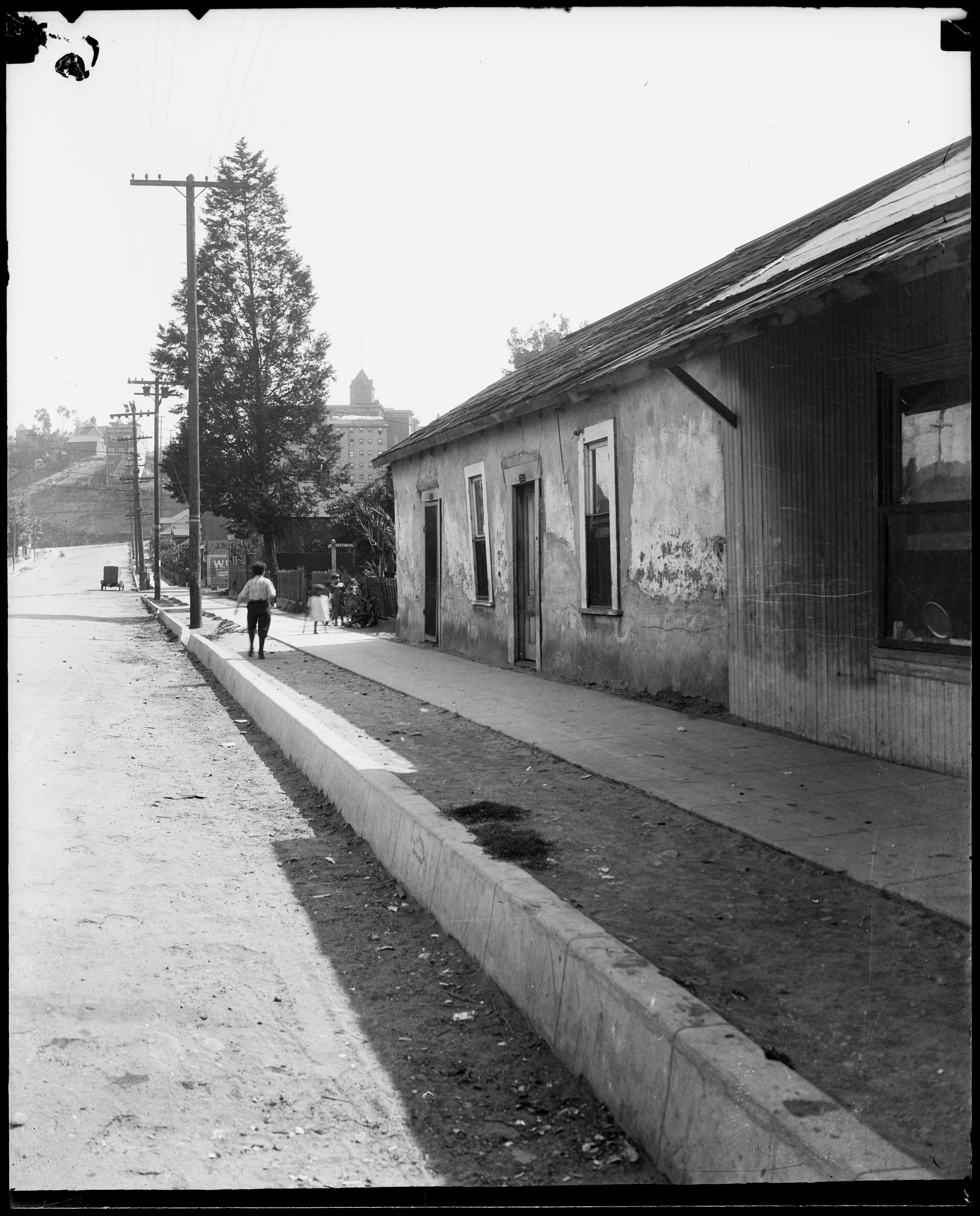
Deteriorating adobe homes in Sonoratown, 1920s.

For the first time, Mexicans in increasing numbers migrated north into the United States for better economic opportunities. In the early 20th century, the first main period of migration to the United States happened between the 1910s to the 1920s, referred to as the Great Migration. During this time period the Mexican Revolution was taking place, creating turmoil within and against the Mexican government causing civilians to seek out economic and political stability in the United States. Over 1.3 million Mexicans relocated to the United States from 1910 well into the 1930s, with significant increases each decade. Many of these immigrants found agricultural work, being contracted under private laborers. The 1930 census enumerated 1.4 million peoples of Mexican 'race', 805,535 being born in the US and 616,998 being foreign born.

During the Great Depression in the 1930s, many Mexicans and Mexican Americans were repatriated to Mexico. Many deportations were overseen by state and local authorities who acted on the encouragement of Secretary of Labor William N. Doak and the Department of Labor. The government deported at least 82,000 people. Between 355,000 and 1,000,000 were repatriated or deported to Mexico in total; approximately forty to sixty percent of those repatriated were birthright citizens – overwhelmingly children. Voluntary repatriation was much more common during the repatriations than formal deportation. According to legal professor Kevin R. Johnson, the repatriation campaign was based on ethnicity and meets the modern legal standards of ethnic cleansing, because it frequently ignored individuals' citizenship.

The second period of increased migration is known as the Bracero Era from 1942 to 1964. This referred to the Bracero program implemented by the United States beginning in World War II. They contracted agricultural labor from Mexico due to labor shortages from the World War II draft. An estimated 4.6 million Mexican immigrants were pulled into the United States through the Bracero Program from the 1940s to the 1960s. The lack of agricultural laborers due to increases in military drafts for World War II opened up a chronic need for low-wage workers to fill jobs.

=== Late 20th century to early 21st century ===
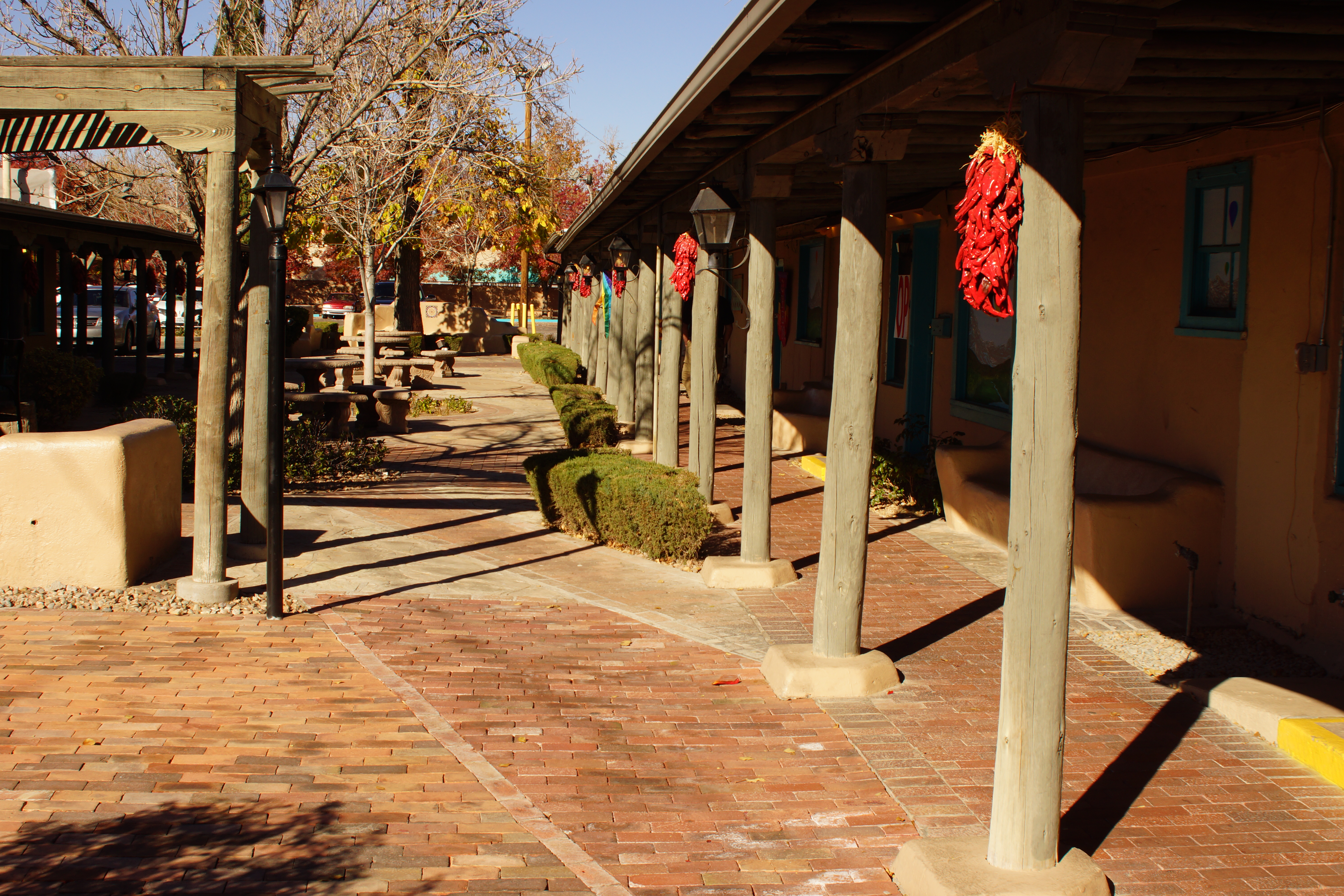
A Walk in Old Town Albuquerque in New Mexico

While Mexican Americans are concentrated in the Southwest: California, Arizona, New Mexico, and Texas, during World War I many moved to industrial communities such as St. Louis, Chicago, Detroit, Cleveland, Pittsburgh, and other steel-producing regions, where they gained industrial jobs. Like European immigrants, they were attracted to work that did not require proficiency in English. Industrial restructuring in the second half of the century put many Mexican Americans out of work in addition to people of other ethnic groups. Their industrial skills were not as useful in the changing economies of these areas.

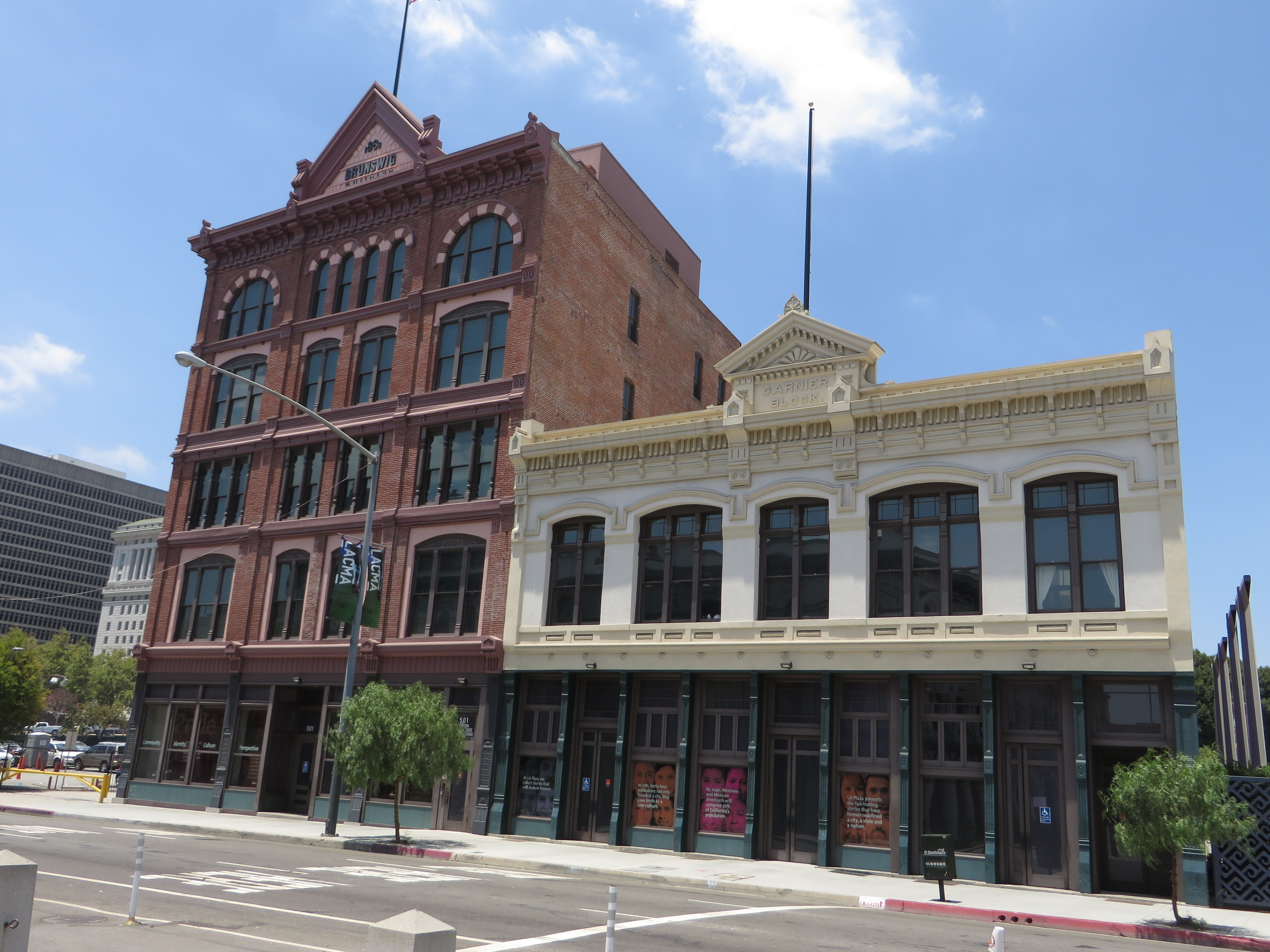
LA Plaza de Cultura y Artes

The Delano grape strike was influenced by the Filipino-American farm worker strike in Coachella Valley, May 1965. Migrant Filipino-American workers asked for a $0.15/hour raise.

The 1965 Delano grape strike, sparked by mostly Filipino American farmworkers, became an intersectional struggle when labor leaders and voting rights and civil rights activists Dolores Huerta, founder of the National Farm Workers Association, and her co-leader César Chávez united with the strikers to form the United Farm Workers. Huerta's slogan "Sí, se puede" (Spanish for "Yes we can"), was popularized by Chávez's fast. It became a rallying cry for the Chicano Movement or Mexican-American civil rights movement. The Chicano movement aimed for a variety of civil rights reforms and was inspired by the civil rights movement; demands ranged from the restoration of land grants to farm workers' rights, to enhanced education, to voting and political rights, as well as emerging awareness of collective history. The Chicano walkouts of antiwar students is traditionally seen as the start of the more radical phase of the Chicano movement.

Mexican Americans were found to place more importance on social and economic issues than they do on immigration. Those who are not citizens care considerably more about social issues. Both citizens and noncitizens identify ethnic issues as the key problem that Mexican Americans face, highlighting the need for stronger community and political organization.

Since there were not many job opportunities in their country, Mexicans moved to the United States to gain work. They often had to settle for low-paying jobs, including as agricultural workers.

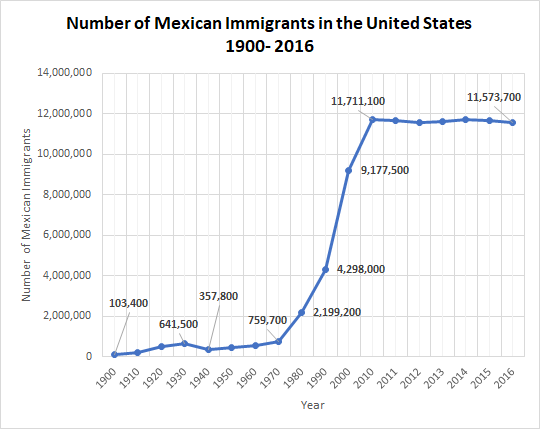
Trend of Mexican migration to the United States. Here the term immigrant refers to those who were not born in the United States but are now currently residing in the United States. This can include naturalized US citizens, legal permanent residents, employees and students on visas, and those in the country illegally.

During this period, civil rights groups such as the National Mexican-American Anti-Defamation Committee were founded. By the early 21st century, the states with the largest percentages and populations of Mexican Americans are California, Arizona, New Mexico, Texas, Colorado, Nevada and Utah. There have also been markedly increasing populations in Oklahoma, Pennsylvania and Illinois.

In terms of religion, Mexican Americans are primarily Roman Catholic, which was largely established in culture during the Spanish and Mexican periods. A large minority are Evangelical Protestants. Notably, according to a Pew Hispanic Center report in 2006 and the Pew Religious Landscape Survey in 2008, Mexican Americans are significantly less likely than other Latino groups to abandon Catholicism for Protestant churches.

In 2008, "Yes We Can" (in Spanish: "Sí, se puede") was adopted as the 2008 campaign slogan of Senator Barack Obama. His election in 2008 and reelection in 2012 as the first African American president depended in part on the growing importance of the Mexican American vote.

The struggle of presidents of both Democratic and Republican administrations to solve immigration reform in the United States has led in part to an increased polarization in the nation over an increasingly diverse population. Mexican Americans have increasingly settled in areas other than traditional centers in the Southwest and Chicago.

Most Mexican Roma came to the United States from Argentina. In 2015, the United States admitted 157,227 Mexican immigrants, and as of November 2016, 1.31 million Mexicans were on the waiting list to immigrate to the United States through legal means. A 2014 survey showed that 34% of Mexicans would immigrate to the United States if given the opportunity, with 17% saying they would do it illegally.

== Race and ethnicity ==
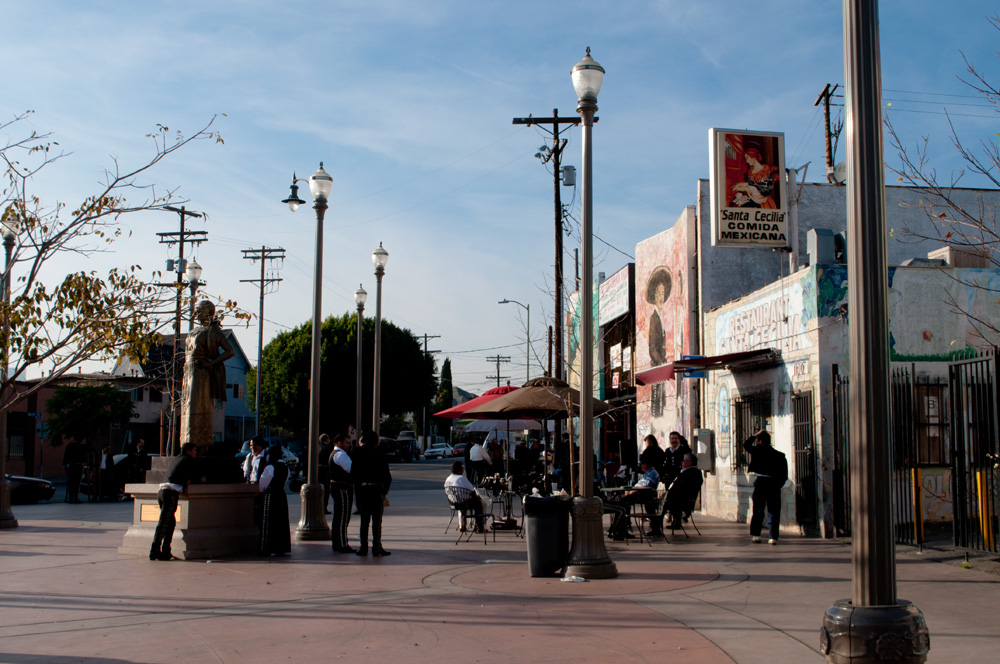
Mariachi bands, who are available for hire, wait at the Mariachi Plaza in Los Angeles.

Racially, Mexican Americans are a diverse population made up primarily of Indigenous and European ancestry, along with African. Also on a smaller scale, some also have backgrounds of East Asian and Middle Eastern descent (mainly Lebanese). The majority of the Mexican population identifies as mestizo. In colonial times, Mestizo was understood to be a person of mixed heritage, particularly European and Native American.

The meaning of the word has changed through time, and in the early 21st century, it is used to refer to the segment of the Mexican population who are of at least partial Indigenous ancestry, but do not speak Indigenous languages.

Thus in Mexico, the term "Mestizo", while still applying mostly to people who are of mixed European and Indigenous descent, to various degrees, has become more of a cultural label rather than a racial one. It is vaguely defined and may include people who do not have Indigenous ancestry, people who do not have European ancestry, as well as people of mixed descent.

Such transformation of the word is the result of a concept known as "mestizaje", which was promoted by the post-revolutionary Mexican government in an effort to create a united Mexican ethno-cultural identity with no racial distinctions. It is because of this that sometimes the Mestizo population in Mexico is estimated to be as high as 93% of the Mexican population.

Per the 2020 US census, the majority of Mexican Americans identified as being Some Other Race (42.2%) or Multiracial (32.7%) with the remainder identifying as white (20.3%), Native American (2.4%), black (1.9%) and Asian / Pacific Islander (0.5%).

2010 US Census
Self-identified Race	Percent of population
White alone	52.8%
Black	2%
Asian	0.1%
American Indians and Alaska Natives	0.4%
Native Hawaiians and Other Pacific Islanders	0.2%
Two or more races	5.0%
Some Other Race	39.5%
Total	100%

This identification as "some other race" reflects activism among Mexican Americans as claiming a cultural status and working for their rights in the United States, as well as the separation due to different language and culture. Hispanics are not a racial classification but an ethnic group.

The barrier that the language places on people who are immigrating from Mexico is difficult due to the importance that is placed in the United States related to knowing how to speak English. The lack of support from surrounding people places an even more difficult strain given that there is not much remorse or yet very little patience that comes from those who these Mexican immigrants may find themselves seeking aid from.

Genetic studies made in the Mexican population have varied as to whether European or Amerindian ancestry predominates in the population. For instance, a 2006 study conducted by Mexico's National Institute of Genomic Medicine (INMEGEN), which genotyped 104 samples, reported that Mestizo Mexicans are 58.96% European, 35.05% Amerindian, and 5.03% African. According to a 2009 report by the Mexican Genome Project, which sampled 300 Mestizos from six Mexican states and one Indigenous group, the gene pool of the Mexican mestizo population was calculated to be 55.2% percent Indigenous, 41.8% European, 5% African, and 0.5% Asian. There is genetic asymmetry, with the direct paternal line predominately European and the maternal line predominately Amerindian. A 2012 study published by the Journal of Human Genetics found the paternal ancestry of the Mexican Mestizo population to be predominately European (64.9%) followed by Amerindian (30.8%) and African (5%). An autosomal ancestry study performed in 2007 on residents of Mexico City reported that the European ancestry of Mexicans was 52%, with the rest being Amerindian and some African contribution. Maternal ancestry was analyzed, with 47% being of European origin. Unlike previous studies that included only Mexicans who self-identified as Mestizos, the only criteria for sample selection in this study was that the volunteers self-identified as Mexicans.

Focusing on populations of Mexican origin or descent in the US, one study found an average of 48.9% Indigenous ancestry in this population, with the remainder being primarily European. Younger Mexican Americans tend to have more Indigenous ancestry; in those studied born between the 1940s and 1990s, there was an average increase in Indigenous ancestry of 0.4% per year. Though there is no simple explanation, it is possibly some combination of assortative mating, changes in migration patterns over time (with more recent immigrants coming from areas of more concentrated Indigenous communities), population growth and other unexamined factors. The study also found that Indigenous ancestry varied by region, with Mexican-Americans from Chicago having an average of 56.2%, while those from San Diego had an average of only 42.8% Indigenous ancestry.

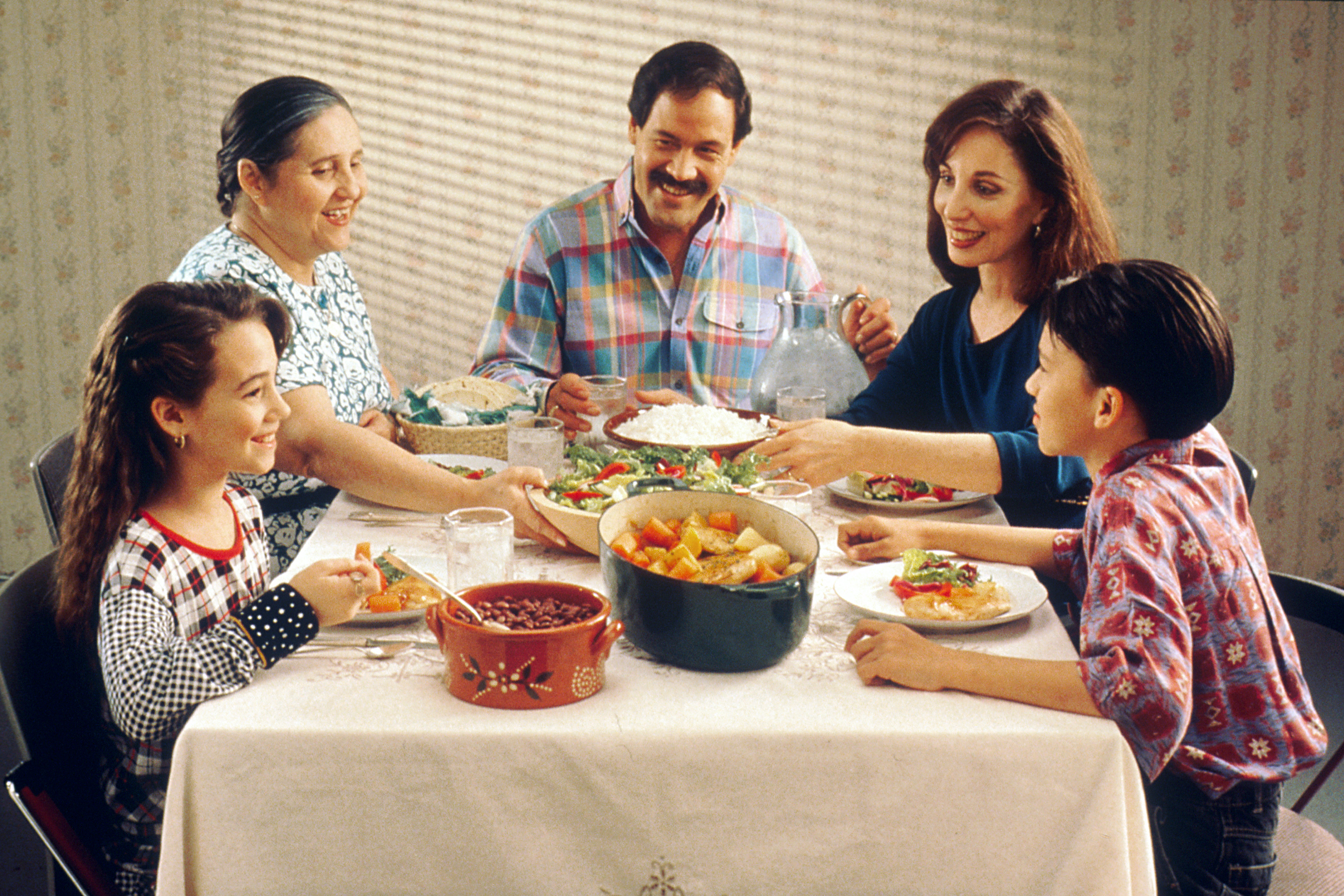
Mexican American family eating a meal

While Mexico does not have comprehensive modern racial censuses, some international publications believe that Mexican people of predominately European descent (Spanish or other European) make up approximately one-sixth (16.5%); this is based on the figures of the last racial census in the country, made in 1921. According to an opinion poll conducted by the Latinobarómetro organization in 2011, 52% of Mexican respondents said they were mestizos, 19% Indigenous, 6% white, 2% mulattos, and 3% other race.

=== US Census Bureau classifications ===
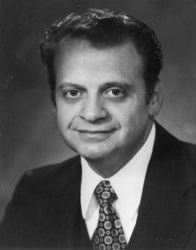
Vincent Barabba notable figure in the U.S. Census Bureau, serving as its director from 1974 to 1979, where he played a key role in modernizing census methodologies and improving the use of data for public policy and planning.

As the United States' borders expanded, the United States Census Bureau changed its racial classification methods for Mexican Americans under United States jurisdiction. The Bureau's classification system has evolved significantly from its inception:

- From 1790 to 1850, there was no distinct racial classification of Mexican Americans in the US census. The categories recognized by the Census Bureau were White, Free People of Color, and Black. The Census Bureau estimates that during this period the number of persons who could not be categorized as white or black did not exceed 0.25% of the total population based on 1860 census data.
- From 1850 through 1920, the Census Bureau expanded its racial categories to include multi-racial persons, under Mestizos, Mulattos, as well as new categories of distinction of Amerindians and Asians. It classified Mexicans and Mexican Americans as "white".
- The 1930 US census added a separate category for "color" or "race" which declassified Mexicans as white. Census workers were instructed to write "W" for white and "Mex" for Mexican. Other categories were "Neg" for Negro; "In" for Amerindian; "Ch" for Chinese; "Jp" for Japanese; "Fil" for Filipino; "Hin" for Hindu; and "Kor" for Korean.
- In the 1940 census, due to widespread protests by the Mexican American community following the 1930 changes, Mexican Americans were re-classified as White. Instructions for enumerators were: "Mexicans – Report 'White' (W) for Mexicans unless they are definitely of Indigenous or other non-white race." During the same census, however, the bureau began to track the White population of Spanish mother tongue. This practice continued through the 1960 census. The 1960 census also used the title "Spanish-surnamed American" in their reporting data of Mexican Americans; this category also covered Cuban Americans, Puerto Ricans and others under the same category.
- From 1970 to 1980, there was a dramatic increase in the number of people who identified as "of Other Race" in the census, reflecting the addition of a question on 'Latino origin' to the 100-percent questionnaire, an increased propensity for Latinos to identify as other than White as they agitated for civil rights, and a change in editing procedures to accept reports of "Other race" for respondents who wrote in ethnic Hispanic entries, such as Mexican, Cuban, or Puerto Rican. In 1970, such responses in the Other race category were reclassified and tabulated as white. During this census, the bureau attempted to identify all Hispanics by use of the following criteria in sampled sets:
  - Spanish speakers and persons belonging to a household where the head of household was a Spanish speaker
  - persons with Spanish heritage by birth location or surname
  - Persons who self-identified Spanish origin or descent
- From 1980 on, the Census Bureau has collected data on Latino origin on a 100-percent basis. The bureau has noted in 2002 that an increasing number of respondents identify as of Latino origin but not of the White race.

For certain purposes, respondents who wrote in "Chicano" or "Mexican" (or indeed, almost all Latino origin groups) in the "Some other race" category were automatically re-classified into the "White race" group.

=== Politics and debate of racial classification ===
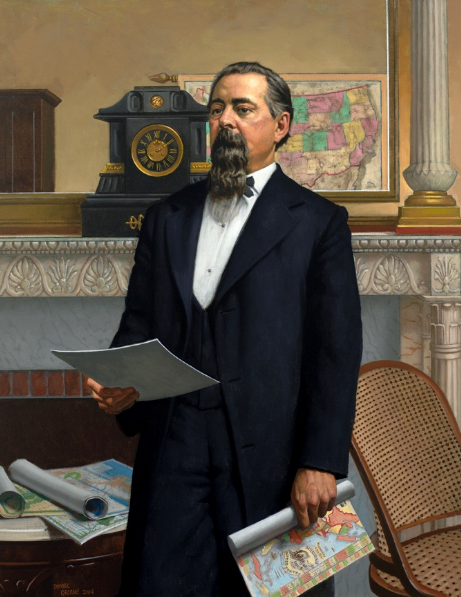
Romualdo Pacheco, a Californio statesman and first Mexican to serve in the US House of Representatives (1877)

In some cases, legal classification of White racial status has made it difficult for Mexican-American rights activists to prove minority discrimination. In the case Hernandez v. Texas (1954), civil rights lawyers for the appellant, named Pedro Hernandez, were confronted with a paradox: because Mexican Americans were classified as White by the federal government and not as a separate race in the census, lower courts held that they were not being denied equal protection by being tried by juries that excluded Mexican Americans by practice. The lower court ruled there was no violation of the Fourteenth Amendment by excluding people with Mexican ancestry among the juries. Attorneys for the state of Texas and judges in the state courts contended that the amendment referred only to racial, not "nationality", groups. Thus, since Mexican Americans were tried by juries composed of their racial group—whites—their constitutional rights were not violated. The US Supreme Court ruling in Hernandez v. Texas case held that "nationality" groups could be protected under the Fourteenth Amendment, and it became a landmark in the civil rights history of the United States.

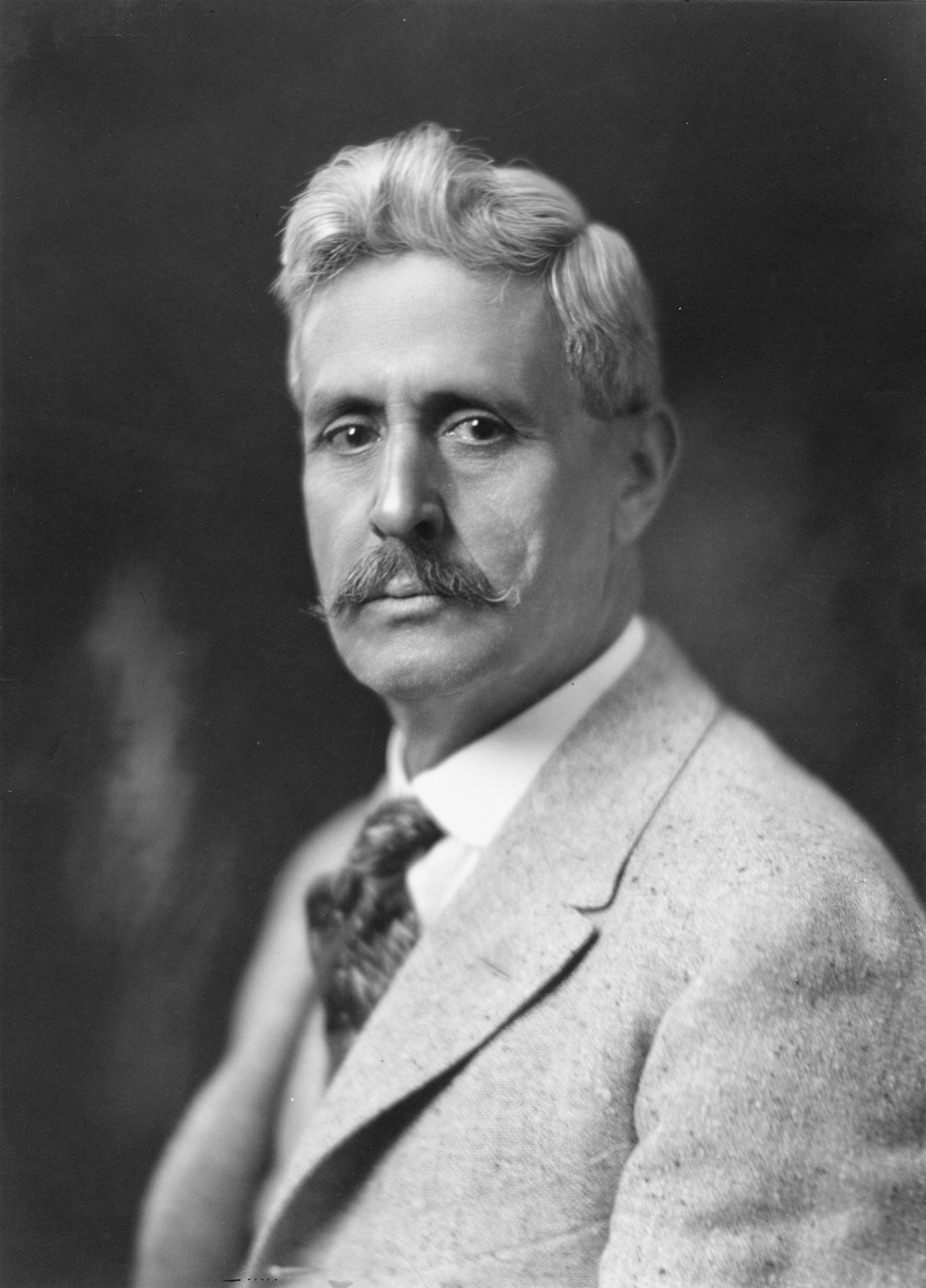
Octaviano Larrazolo became the first Mexican American to serve in the US Senate (1928)

While Mexican Americans served in all-White units during World War II, many Mexican–American veterans continued to face discrimination when they arrived home; they created the G.I. Forum to work for equal treatment.

In times and places in the United States where Mexicans were classified as White, they were permitted by law to intermarry with what today are termed "non-Latino whites". Social customs typically approved of such marriages only if the Mexican partner was not of visible Indigenous ancestry.

In the late 1960s the founding of the Crusade for Justice in Denver and the land grant movement in New Mexico in 1967 set the bases for what would become known as Chicano (Mexican American) nationalism. The 1968 Los Angeles, California school walkouts expressed Mexican-American demands to end de facto ethnic segregation (also based on residential patterns), increase graduation rates, and reinstate a teacher fired for supporting student political organizing. A notable event in the Chicano movement was the 1972 Convention of La Raza Unida (United People) Party, which organized with the goal of creating a third party to give Chicanos political power in the United States.

In the past, Mexicans were legally considered "White" because either they were accepted as being of Spanish ancestry, or because of early treaty obligations to Spaniards and Mexicans that conferred citizenship status to Mexican peoples before the American Civil War. Numerous slave states bordered Mexican territory at a time when 'whiteness' was nearly a prerequisite for US citizenship in those states.

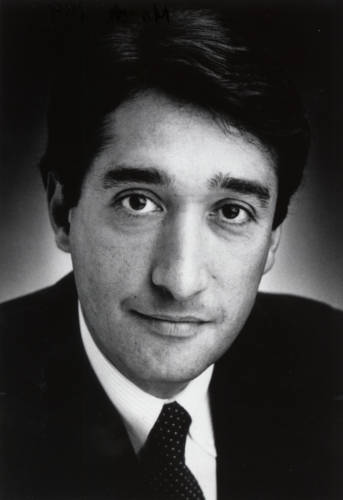
Henry Cisneros the first Mexican American mayor of a major U.S. city, San Antonio, Texas, in 1981. Cisneros later went on to serve as the Secretary of Housing and Urban Development

Although Mexican Americans were legally classified as "white" in terms of official federal policy, socially they were seen as "too Indian" to be treated as such. Many organizations, businesses, and homeowners associations and local legal systems had official policies in the early 20th century to exclude Mexican Americans in a racially discriminatory way. Throughout the Southwest, discrimination in wages was institutionalized in "White wages" versus lower "Mexican wages" for the same job classifications. For Mexican Americans, opportunities for employment were largely limited to guest worker programs.

The bracero program, begun in 1942 during World War II, when many United States men were drafted for war, allowed Mexicans temporary entry into the United States as migrant workers at farms throughout California and the Southwest. This program continued until 1964.

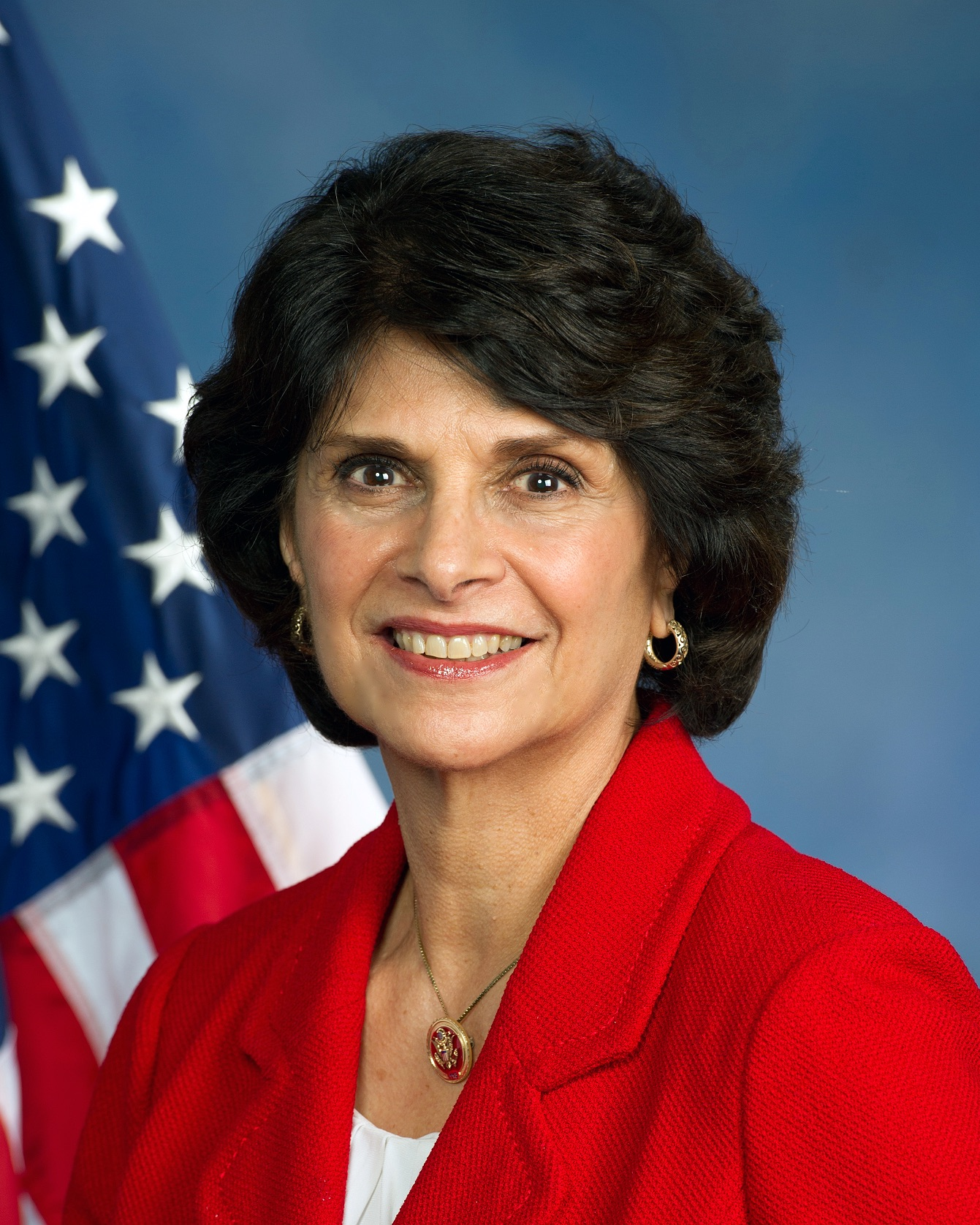
Lucille Roybal-Allard, daughter of Edward R. Roybal, first Latino chair of the Congressional Hispanic Caucus

While both Mexican American and African American minorities were subject to segregation and racial discrimination, they were treated differently. Segregation is the physical separation of peoples on the basis of ethnicity and social custom historically applied to separate African Americans and Mexican Americans from Whites in Texas. Racial attitudes that supported segregation of African Americans probably arrived in Texas during the 1820s in company with the "peculiar institution," slavery. Anglo-Americans began extending segregation to Mexican Americans after the Texas Revolution as a social custom. Tejanos formed a suspect class during and after the revolution, and that fact led to a general aversion of them. After the Civil War, segregation developed as a method of group control. For both minority groups, segregation existed in schools, churches, residential districts, and most public places such as restaurants, theaters, and barber shops. By the latter years of the nineteenth century, institutionalized segregation flourished legally in places with a visible Black population and was extended informally to Tejanos. Most Texas towns and cities had a "Negro quarter" and a "Mexican quarter."

Although the law specified until 1890 that Black schools were to have equal access to the common school fund, they often did not. In the early twentieth century, Black and Mexican schools faced lamentable conditions endemic in an antiquated educational system, and educational reforms of the Progressive era did not improve matters. During the 1920s, Black schoolchildren were more likely to miss school than White students, Black teachers received less pay and training than their White counterparts, and teaching accommodations ordinarily amounted to one-room buildings generally under the tutelage of a single teacher. The same circumstances applied to Hispanic students, who were segregated because some Whites thought them "dirty" and because some White employers desired an uneducated, inexpensive labor pool. Whatever schools existed often suffered from inadequate financing, poor educational facilities, and racist curriculum.

== Demographics ==
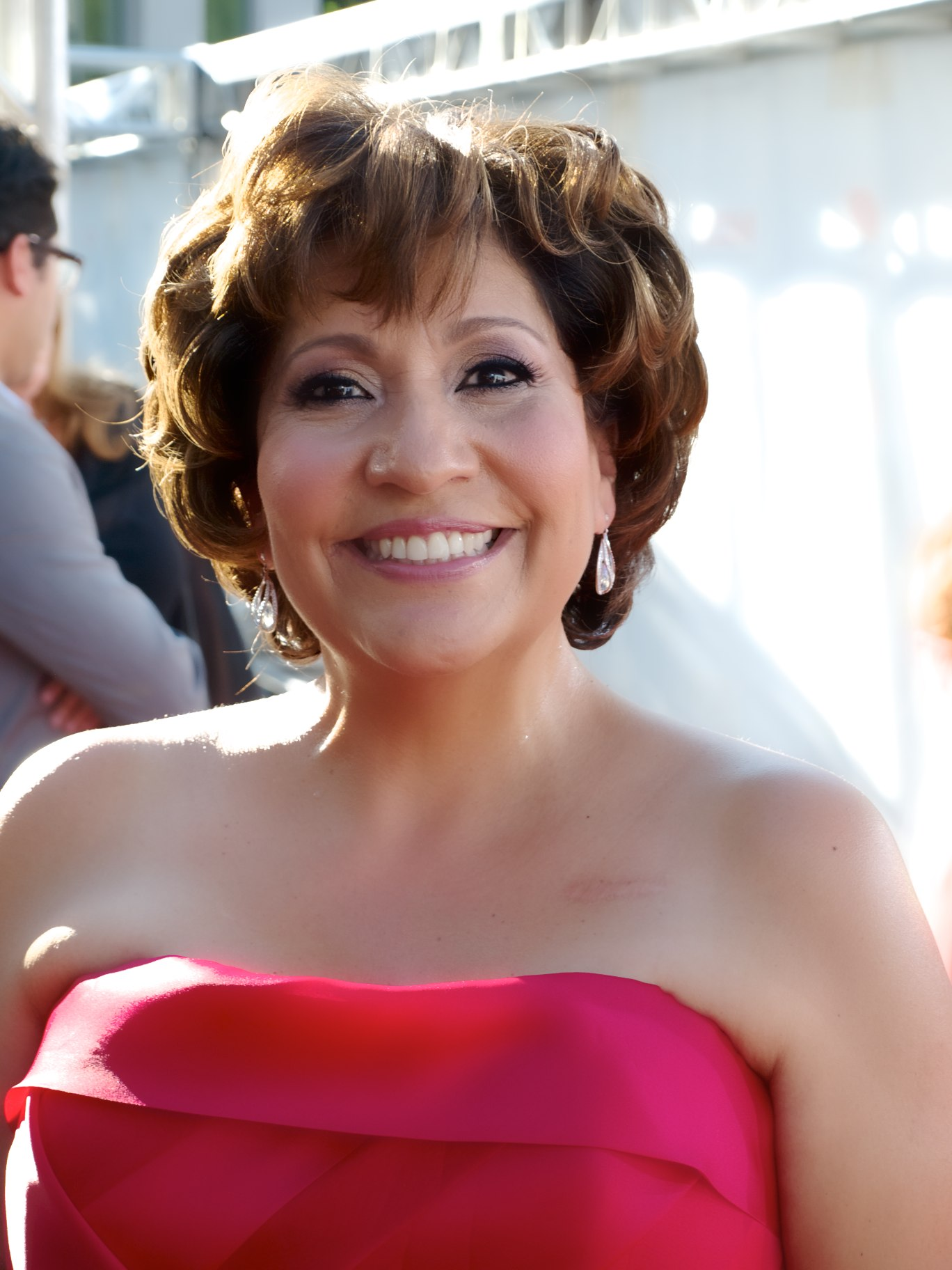
Janet Murguía is president of UnidosUS, the United States' largest Hispanic nonprofit advocacy organization.

Per 2021 data, Mexican Americans are concentrated in California (34%), Texas (26%), Arizona (5%), Illinois (5%), and Colorado (2%).

The counties with the largest Mexican population are Los Angeles County, Harris County, Cook County and Dallas County. The metropolitan areas with the largest Mexican population is Greater Los Angeles, the Chicago metropolitan area, Dallas–Fort Worth metroplex, and Greater Houston.

Mexican Americans have long been the second largest minority group in the United States after African Americans.

The Mexican American population was still concentrated in Southwestern states such as Arizona, New Mexico, Colorado, Texas, and California in the late 1800s and early 1900s. Mexican Americans starting moving from the southwestern to large northeastern and midwestern cities after World War II. Large Mexican American communities developed in cities in the northeast and midwest such as St. Louis, Chicago, Detroit, Cleveland, and Pittsburgh. Around 90 percent of Mexicans in the United States live in urban areas.

There is recent Mexican enclaves in Salt Lake City and Atlanta.

The Mexican population has been rapidly increasing in North Carolina and Georgia.

Mexican Americans have the highest fertility rate in the United States. While only 10% of the United States's population was Mexican American in the year 2008, 16% of the country's births were to Mexican mothers. Mexican-Americans are generally younger than other racial and ethnic groups in the United States. Mexican Americans also have more children than other races and Hispanic groups in the United States.

=== Mexican-born population over time ===
Year	Population	Percentage of all US immigrants
1850	13,300	0.6
1860	27,500	0.7
1870	42,400	0.8
1880	68,400	1.0
1890	77,900	0.8
1900	103,400	1.0
1910	221,900	1.6
1920	486,400	3.5
1930	641,500	4.5
1940	357,800	3.1
1950	451,400	3.9
1960	575,900	5.9
1970	759,700	7.9
1980	2,199,200	15.6
1990	4,298,000	21.7
2000	9,177,500	29.5
2010	11,711,100	29.3
2019	10,931,900	24.3

== Culture ==
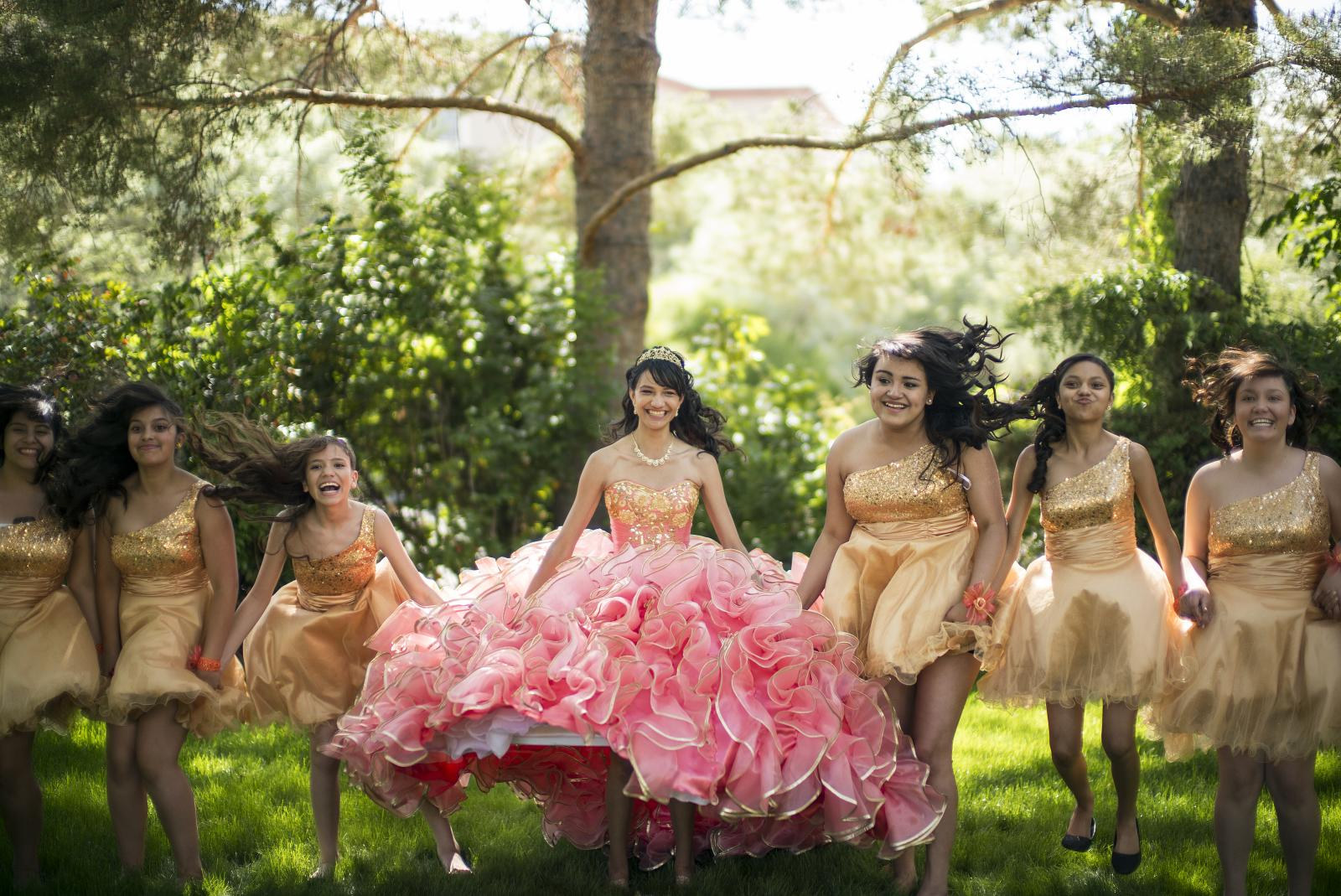
A Quinceañera celebration in Santa Fe, New Mexico

Mexican American culture reflects the influences of Spain, Mexico, and Indigenous cultures.

Family units and structures are typically larger among Mexican Americans. Parents and elders are treated with a high degree of respect by Mexican Americans. Mexican Americans often celebrate Quinceañeras.

=== Food and drink ===
Mexican Americans have influenced American cuisine, burritos, enchiladas, guacamole, nachos, tacos, tamales, and tortillas, are regular in American vernacular. The cuisines of New Mexican and Tex-Mex are native to the cuisine of the Southwestern United States, and Mexican cuisine has influenced Californian cuisine. Mexican American cuisine, including dishes, snacks, seasonings, and cultural traditions, has significantly influenced American cuisine. Tortillas have risen to become the second most popular packaged bread, while salsa consistently outsells ketchup as a condiment in the United States. Mexican cuisine is now recognized as one of the "top three" ethnic cuisines, alongside Italian cuisine and Chinese cuisine, in the preferences of Americans. Additionally, American fast food chains like Chipotle Mexican Grill and Taco Bell have popularized the concept of Mexican cuisine, making it widely recognized in the United States.

=== Literature ===
Mexican American literature is literature written by Mexican Americans in the United States. Although its origins can be traced back to the sixteenth century, the bulk of Mexican American literature dates from post-1848 and the United States annexation of large parts of Mexico in the wake of the Mexican–American War. Today, as a part of American literature in general, this genre includes a vibrant and diverse set of narratives, prompting critics to describe it as providing "a new awareness of the historical and cultural independence of both northern and southern American hemispheres". Chicano literature is an aspect of Mexican American literature.

=== Music ===
The popular radio format Regional Mexican includes Mexican styles of music; Norteño, ranchera, Conjunto, Son Jarocho, Cumbia, and mariachi. It also includes the Indigenous and Mexican American music styles of the New Mexico music, Tejano music, Chicano rock, Chicano rap and Cumbia rap, which originate in the United States. Mexican Americans also have played and have continued to play significant roles in the production, exhibition, signification and reception of West Coast hip-hop. Since the 1980s, African-American rappers from Los Angeles, including Ice-T and Eazy-E have helped Mexican-American rappers achieve recognition.

=== Sports ===
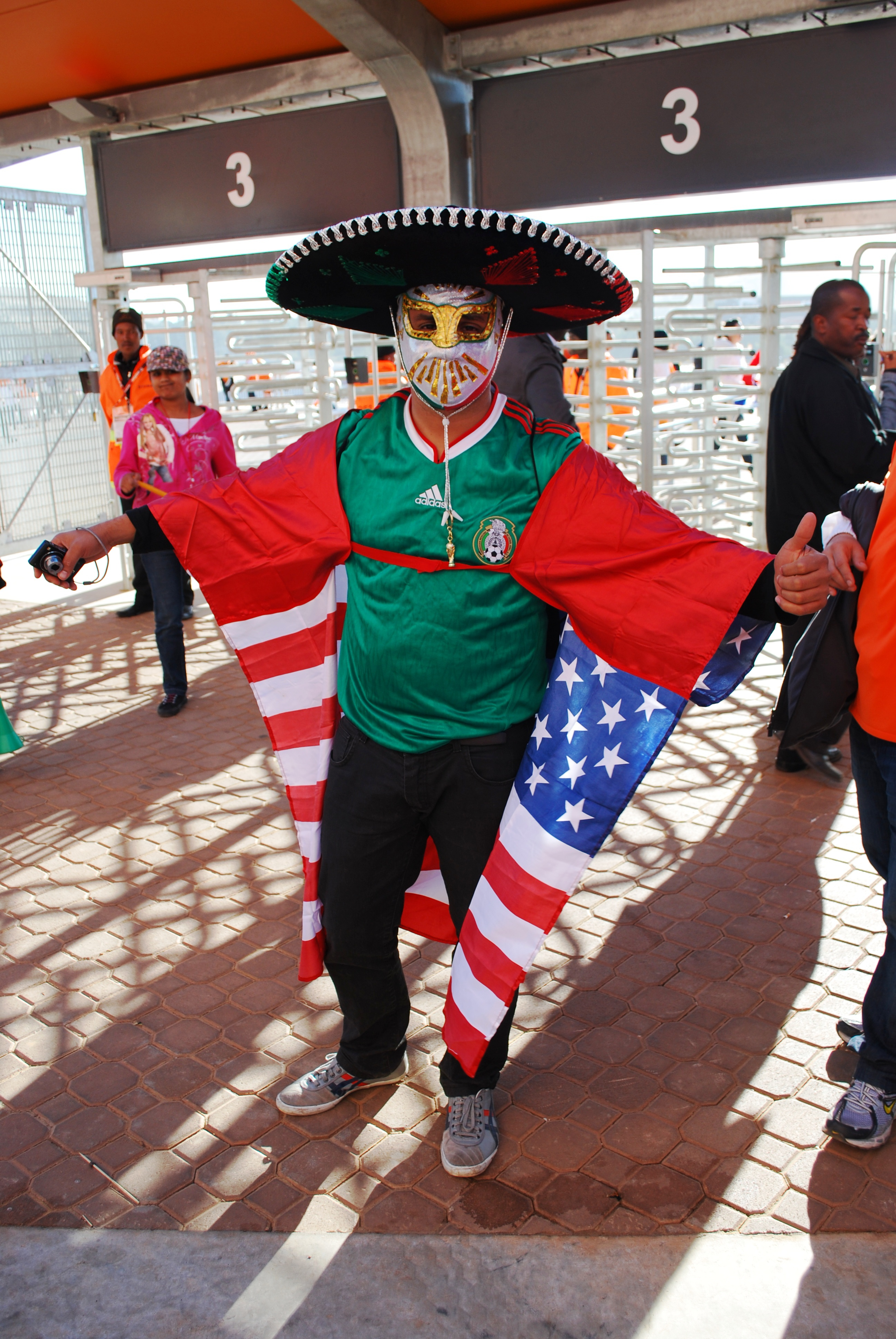
Fan at the 2010 U.S. vs. England FIFA World Cup match

Soccer is a major sport for many Mexican Americans, with some supporting or even playing for the Mexican national team. Fastpitch softball has also been played by some Mexican American communities for several decades, contributing to cultural and social solidarity.

=== Gangs ===
A cholo is a Mexican American person who participates with Mexican-American gang subculture. Cholos speak Caló, a term derived from the Caló language of Romani people (Gypsies) from Spain and Portugal. The Mexican Mafia is active in Los Angeles.

== Economic and social issues ==
=== Immigration issues ===
See also Strangers No Longer: Together on the Journey of Hope, a pastoral letter written by both the United States Conference of Catholic Bishops and the Mexican Episcopal Conference, which deals with the issue of migration in the context of the United States and Mexico.

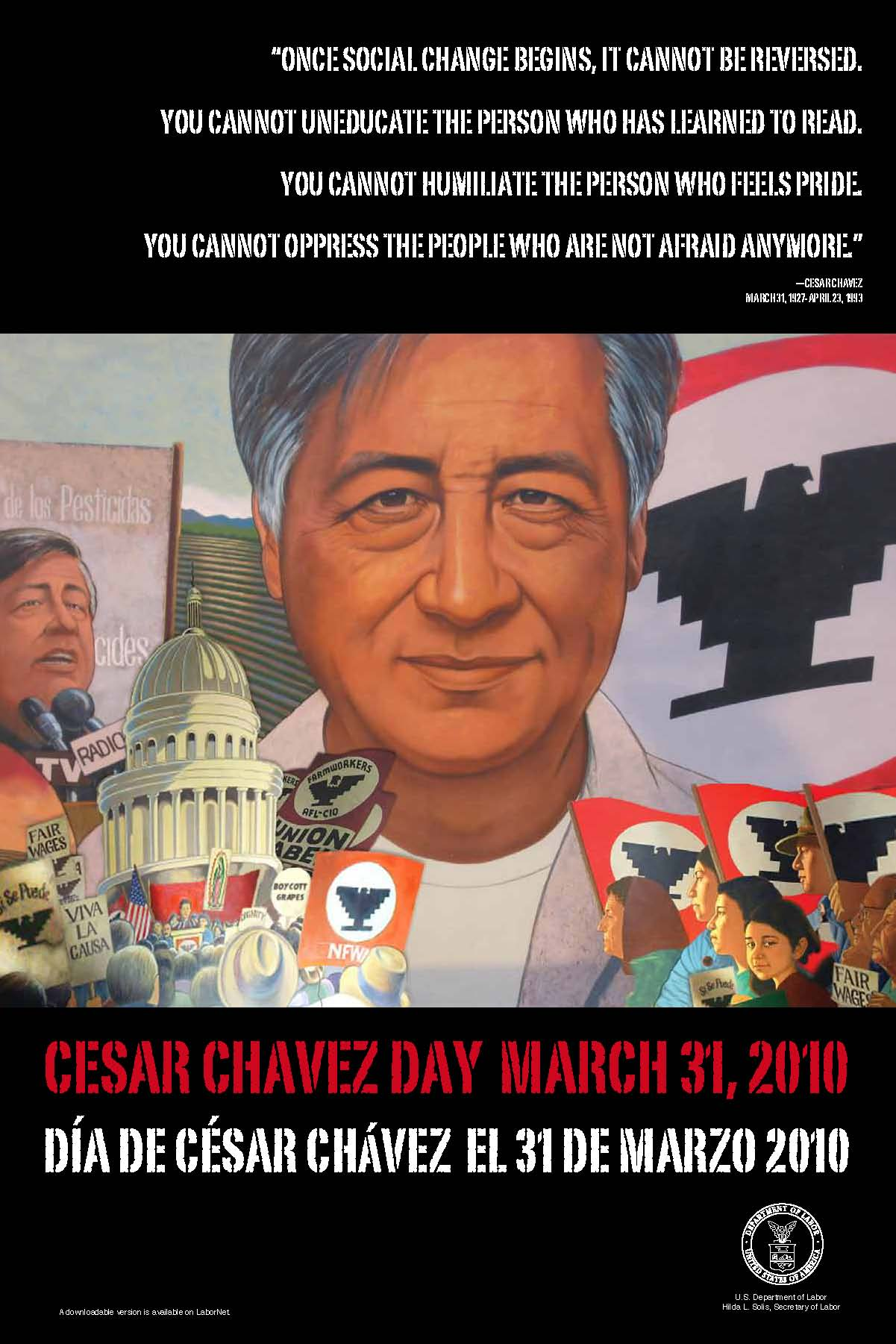
Cesar Chavez's supporters say his work led to numerous improvements for union laborers. Although the UFW faltered a few years after Chavez died in 1993, he became an iconic "folk saint" in the pantheon of Mexican Americans.

Since the 1960s, Mexican immigrants have met a significant portion of the demand for low cost labor in the United States. Fear of deportation makes them highly vulnerable to exploitation by employers. Many employers, however, have developed a "don't ask, don't tell" attitude toward hiring Mexican nationals residing in the country illegally. In May 2006, hundreds of thousands of illegal immigrants, Mexicans and other nationalities, walked out of their jobs across the country in protest to support immigration reform (many in hopes of a path to citizenship similar to the Immigration Reform and Control Act of 1986 signed into law by President Ronald Reagan, which granted citizenship to Mexican nationals living and working without documentation in the US). Governmentalities have been the result of unequal relations with its northern neighbors versus a response to more locally driven needs.

US politicians cited numbers as high as 20 million illegal immigrants in the United States without providing statistical proof.

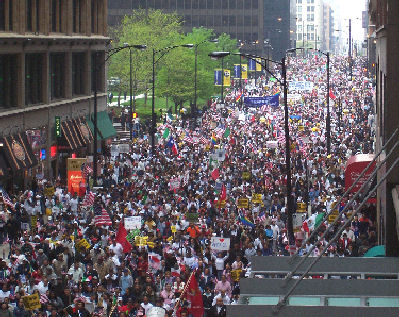
A rally on May Day 2006 in Chicago. The protests began in response to proposed legislation known as H.R. 4437, which would raise penalties for illegal immigration and classify illegal immigrants and anyone who helped them enter or remain in the US as felons.

Some immigrants to the United States, both from Mexico and elsewhere, oppose illegal immigration, even if they once lacked documents themselves. However, according to a survey conducted by the Pew Research Center in June 2007, 63% of Americans would support an immigration policy that would put illegal immigrants on a path to citizenship if they "pass background checks, pay fines and have jobs, learn English", while 30% would oppose such a plan. The survey also found that if this program was instead labeled "amnesty", 54% would support it, while 39% would oppose.

Alan Greenspan, former Chairman of the Federal Reserve, has said that the growth of the working-age population is a large factor in keeping the economy growing and that immigration can be used to grow that population. According to Greenspan, by 2030, the growth of the US workforce will slow from 1 percent to 1/2 percent, while the percentage of the population over 65 years will rise from 13 percent to perhaps 20 percent. Greenspan has also stated that immigration reform could be brought about with a "stroke of the pen", referring to the Comprehensive Immigration Reform Act of 2007 which would have created a guest worker program and put illegal immigrants currently residing in the US on a path to citizenship if they met certain conditions.

Approximately 90 percent of permanent resident cards issued to Mexican nationals are obtained through family sponsorship. Mexican nationals face the longest wait times for family-sponsored preference visas, with petitions filed in 2001 for married children and siblings of U.S. citizens still awaiting visa availability as of August 2026. As of 2023, approximately 1.2 million Mexican nationals were awaiting immigrant visa availability, the highest number of any nationality.

== Discrimination and stereotypes ==
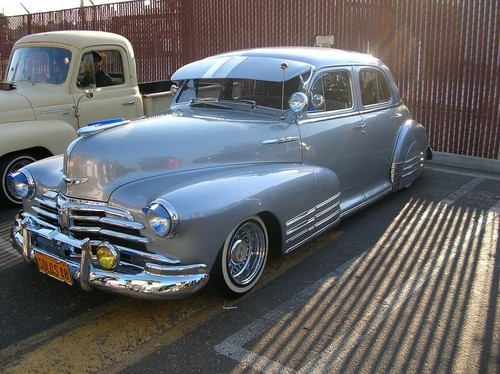
Lowrider began in the Mexican-American barrios of Los Angeles in the mid-to-late 1940s and during the post-war prosperity of the 1950s. Initially, some youths would place sandbags in the trunk of their customized cars to create a lowered effect.

Throughout US history, Mexican Americans have endured various types of negative stereotypes which have long circulated in media and popular culture. Mexican Americans have also faced discrimination based on ethnicity, race, culture, poverty, and use of the Spanish language.

Mexicans faced racially segregated schooling in a number of Western states during the Depression era. In Wyoming, the segregation of Mexican children—regardless of US citizenship—mirrored the South's Jim Crow laws. The segregation of Mexicans also occurred in California and in neighboring Colorado, Montana, and Nebraska.

Since the majority of illegal immigrants in the US have traditionally been from Latin America, the Mexican American community has been the subject of widespread immigration raids. During The Great Depression, the United States government sponsored a Mexican Repatriation program which was intended to encourage people to voluntarily move to Mexico, but thousands were deported against their will. During the 1930s, between 355 000 and 1 million individuals were repatriated or deported to Mexico, approximately 40 to 60 percent of which were actually United States citizens – overwhelmingly children. Voluntary repatriation was far more common than formal deportation. In the post-war era, the Justice Department launched Operation Wetback.

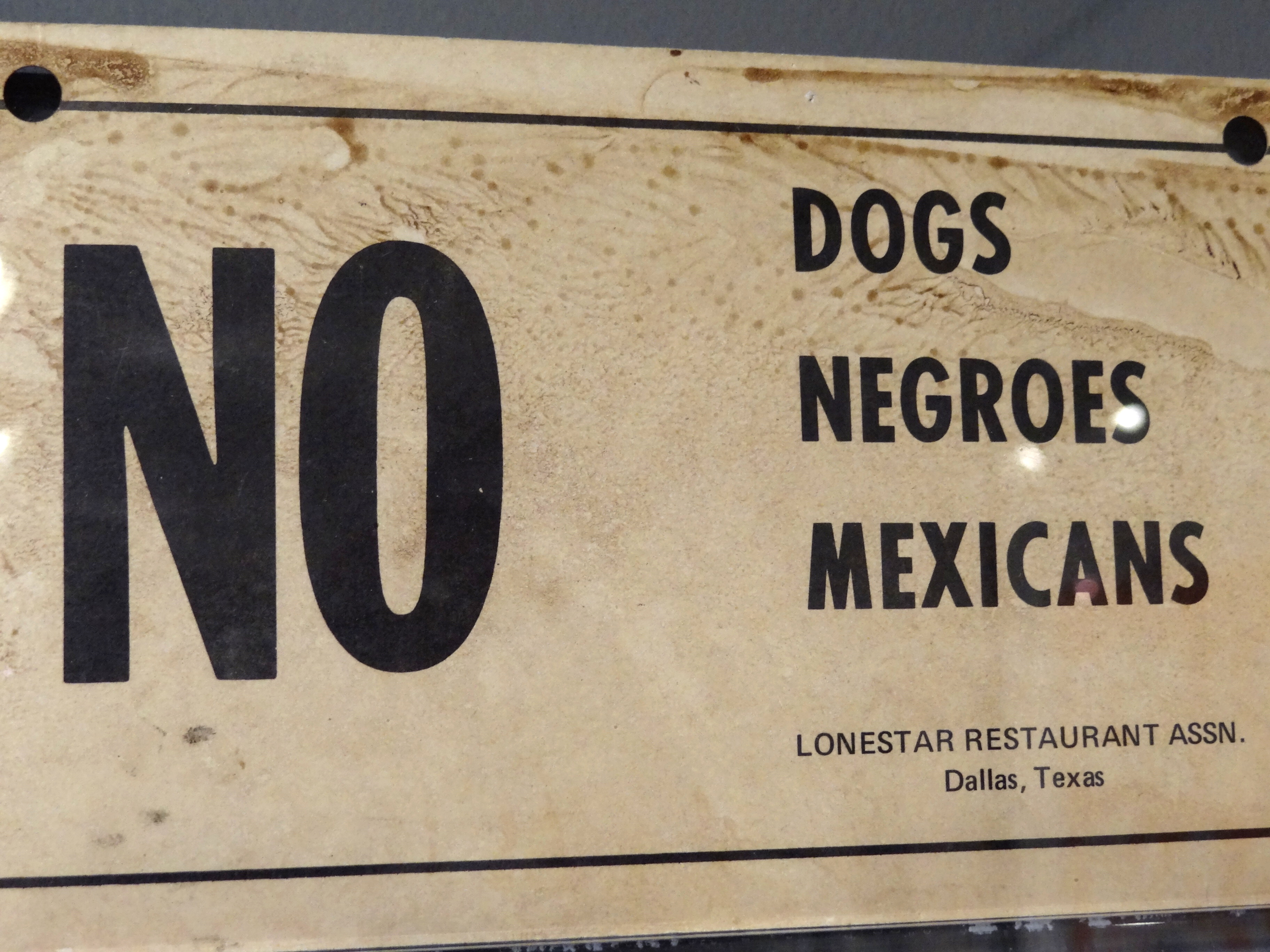
Sign from a restaurant in Dallas, Texas, now located in the National Civil Rights Museum

During World War II, more than 300,000 Mexican Americans served in the US armed forces. Mexican Americans were generally integrated into regular military units; however, many Mexican–American War veterans were discriminated against and even denied medical services by the United States Department of Veterans Affairs when they arrived home. In 1948, war veteran Hector P. Garcia founded the American GI Forum to address the concerns of Mexican American veterans who were being discriminated against. The AGIF's first campaign was on the behalf of Felix Longoria, a Mexican American private who was killed in the Philippines while in the line of duty. Upon the return of his body to his hometown of Three Rivers, Texas, he was denied funeral services because of his nationality.

The Zoot Suit riots took place from June 3–8, 1943, in Los Angeles involving white American servicemen stationed in Southern California and young Latino and Mexican American city residents. It was one of the dozen wartime industrial cities that suffered race-related riots in the summer of 1943. White servicemen and white Angelenos attacked and stripped children, teenagers, and youths who wore zoot suits. While most of the violence was directed toward Mexican American youth, African American youths who were wearing zoot suits were also attacked. The defiance of zoot suiters became inspirational for Chicanos during the Chicano Movement that worked to embrace a Chicano identity and worldview that combated structural racism.

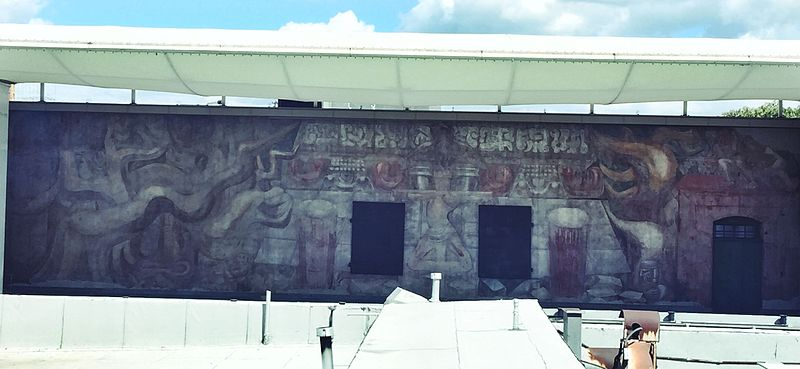
America Tropical mural by artist David Alfaro Siqueiros, created in 1932, that depicts the struggles of Indigenous peoples and critiques imperialism, colonialism, and the exploitation of labor.

In the 1948 case of Perez v. Sharp, the Supreme Court of California recognized that the ban on interracial marriage violated the Fourteenth Amendment of the Federal Constitution from 1868. The case involved Andrea Perez, a Mexican-American woman listed as White, and Sylvester Davis, an African American man.

In 1971, U.S. president Richard Nixon is recorded exhibiting prejudice toward Mexican Americans and African Americans. Referring to Latinos he states, "At the present time they steal, they're dishonest, but they do have some concept of family life. They don't live like a bunch of dogs, which the Negroes do live like."

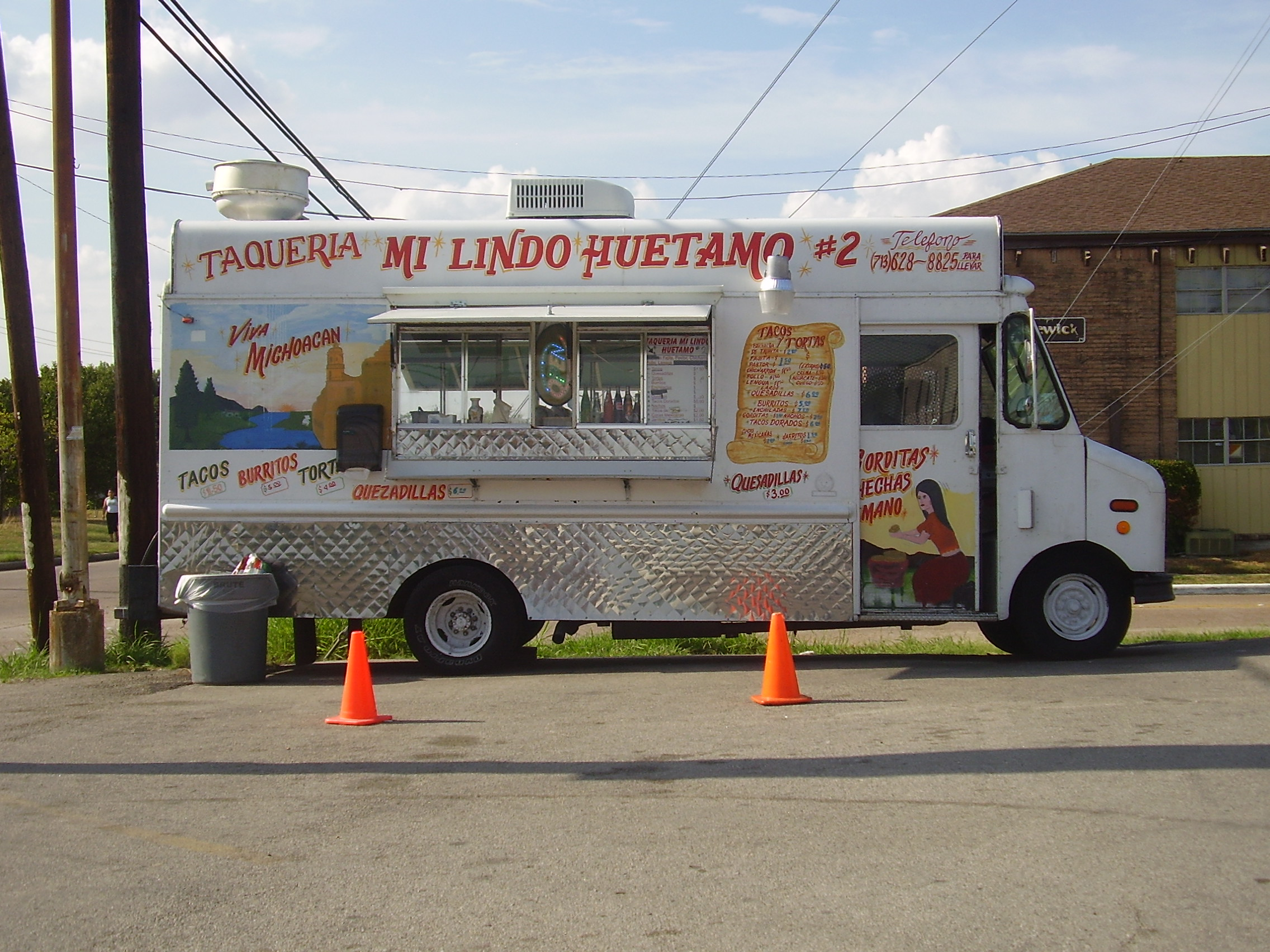
Food truck Mi Lindo Huetamo No. 2, in Houston, Texas.

In 2006, Time magazine reported that the number of hate groups in the United States increased by 33% since 2000, with illegal immigration being used as a foundation for recruitment. According to the 2011 Federal Bureau of Investigation (FBI) Hate Crimes Statistics Report, 56.9% of the 939 victims of crimes motivated by a bias toward the victims' ethnicity or national origin were directed at Latinos. In California, the state with the largest Mexican American population, the number of hate crimes committed against Latinos almost doubled from 2003 to 2007. In 2011, hate crimes against Hispanics declined 31% in the United States and 43% in California. The 2019 El Paso Walmart shooting which resulted in 23 deaths and 22 injuries, was a result of the gunman's racist attitude towards Mexican Americans and Latino immigrants in general.

In 2015, future president Donald Trump offended Mexican Americans by falsely stating "They're bringing drugs. They're bringing crime. They're rapists. And some, I assume, are good people." He began construction on and partially built the Mexico–United States border wall to prevent illegal Mexican immigrants from entering the United States.

Although many Mexican Americans descend from Indigenous Amerindians, and although many Mexican Americans have been in country for many generations, Mexicans are often seen and stereotyped as newly arrived cultural parasites and border hoppers in the United States. Mexican men are stereotyped as illiterate criminals. Mexican women are depicted as hypersexual. Mexicans are stereotyped as lazy, dirty, physically unattractive menaces. Mexicans are also stereotyped to be drug dealers and gang members.

== Social status and assimilation ==
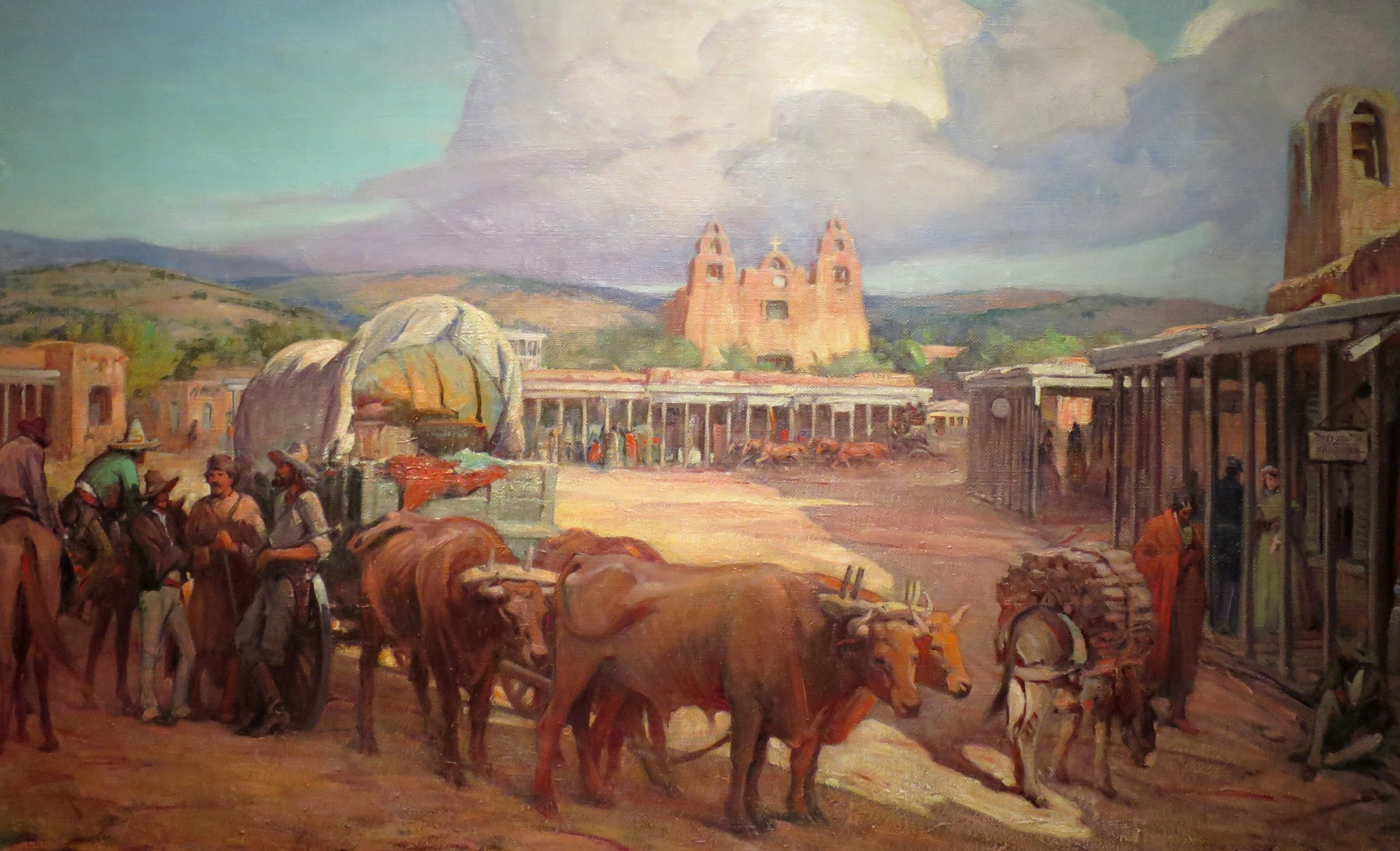
Santa Fe Plaza c, 1850, after the Mexican Cession to the United States.

There have been increases in average personal and household incomes for Mexican Americans in the 21st century. US-born Americans of Mexican heritage earn more and are represented more in the middle and upper-class segments more than most recently arriving Mexican immigrants.

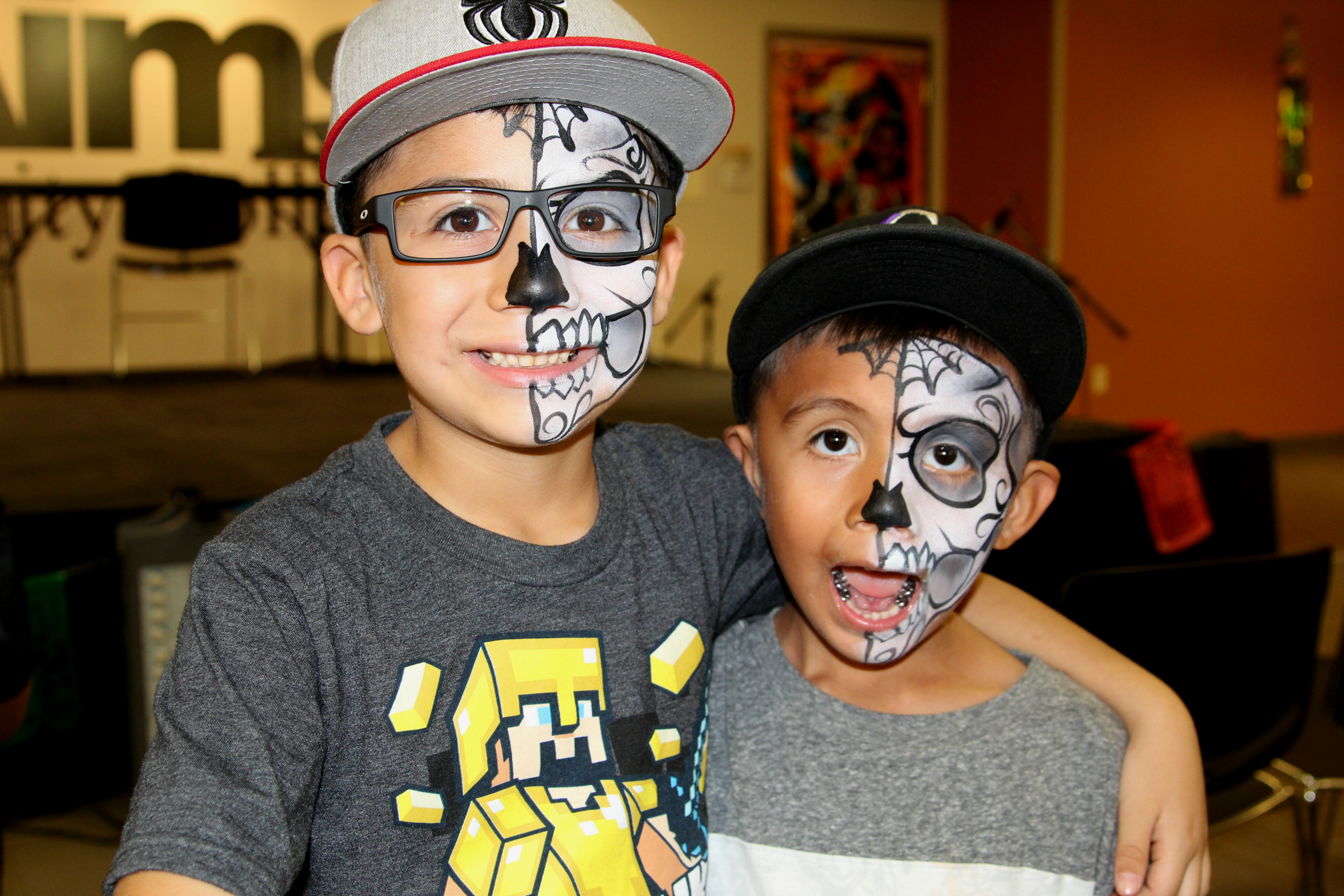
Two Mexican American boys at a Día de Los Muertos celebration in Greeley, Colorado

Most immigrants from Mexico, as elsewhere, come from the lower classes and from families generationally employed in lower skilled jobs. They also are most likely from rural areas. Thus, many new Mexican immigrants are not skilled in white collar professions. Recently, some professionals from Mexico have been migrating, but to make the transition from one country to another involves re-training and re-adjusting to conform to US laws —i.e. professional licensing is required. Millions crossed into the United States to find work that would help them survive as well as sustain their families in Mexico. However now, Mexican Americans, primarily those who are bilingual are being used by firms to attract immigrant clientele. More value is being placed on Mexican Americans because they possess the ability to communicate with Spanish-speaking clients, thus expanding the customer range of companies.

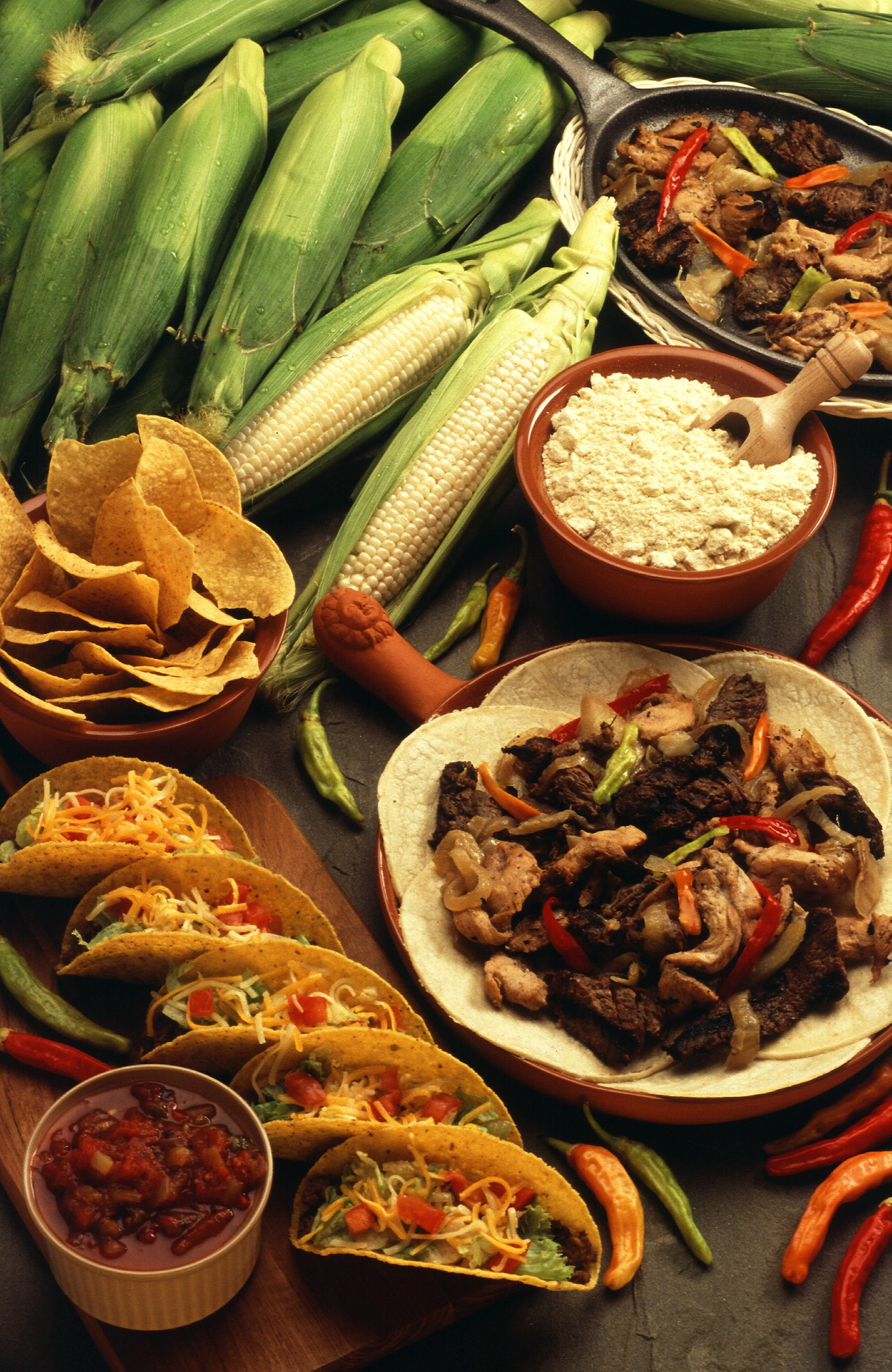
Mexican food has become part of the mainstream American market, just as Italian food did decades before and assimilated to the American market like Tex-Mex.

According to James P. Smith, the children and grandchildren of Hispanic immigrants tend to lessen educational and income gaps with White American. Immigrant Latino men earn about half of what whites make, while second generation US-born Hispanics make about 78 percent of the salaries of their white counterparts and by the third generation US-born Latinos make on average identical wages to their US-born white counterparts. However, the number of Mexican American professionals have been growing in size since 2010. According to Gutiérrez, Ramón throughout the 1980s, single Mexican women have made up an important portion of this migration, they are representing up to 40% of the total immigrant movement. Mexican women are mostly employed in service-related jobs such as service workers, housekeepers, and nannies, with a smaller involvement in agricultural labor. While Mexicans who have strong academic skills, have been granted with legal status in the United States, and their percentage is less compared to the infusion of unskilled immigrants.

Huntington (2005) argues that the sheer number, concentration, linguistic homogeneity, and other characteristics of Latin American immigrants will erode the dominance of English as a nationally unifying language, weaken the country's dominant cultural values, and promote ethnic allegiances over a primary identification as an American. Testing these hypotheses with data from the US Census and national and Los Angeles opinion surveys, Citrin et al. (2007) show that Latinos generally acquire English and lose Spanish rapidly beginning with the second generation, and appear to be no more or less religious or committed to the work ethic than native-born non-Mexican American whites. However, the children and grandchildren of Mexican immigrants were able to make close ties with their extended families in Mexico, since United States shares a 2,000-mile border with Mexico. Many had the opportunity to visit Mexico on a relatively frequent basis. As a result, many Mexicans were able to maintain a strong Mexican culture, language, and relationship with others.

South et al. (2005) examine Hispanic spatial assimilation and inter-neighborhood geographic mobility. Their longitudinal analysis of seven hundred Mexican, Puerto Rican, and Cuban immigrants followed from 1990 to 1995 finds broad support for hypotheses derived from the classical account of assimilation into American society. High income, English-language use, and embeddedness in American social contexts increased Latin American immigrants' geographic mobility into multi-ethnic neighborhoods. US citizenship and years spent in the United States were positively associated with geographic mobility into different neighborhoods while co-ethnic contact and prior experiences of ethnic discrimination decreased the likelihood that Latino immigrants would move from their original neighborhoods and into non-Latino white census tracts.

=== Intermarriage ===
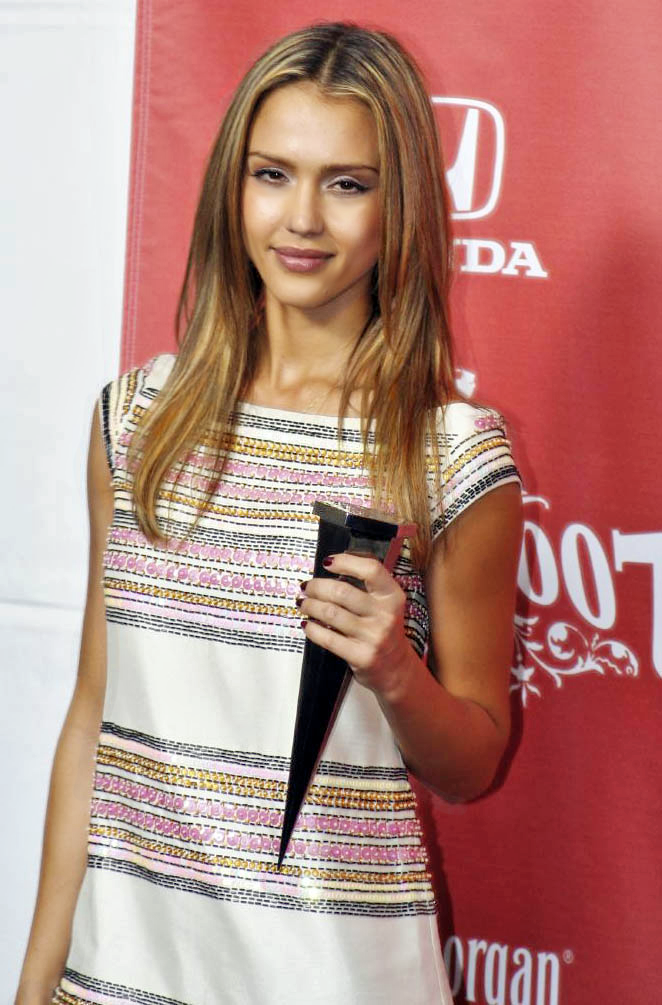
Jessica Alba's mother has Danish, Welsh, German and French ancestry, while her paternal grandparents, who were born in California, were the children of Mexican immigrants.

According to 2000 census data, US-born ethnic Mexicans have a high degree of intermarriage with non-Latino whites. Based on a sample size of 38,911 US-born Mexican husbands and 43,527 US-born Mexican wives:

- 50.6% of US-born Mexican men and 45.3% of US-born Mexican women were married to US-born Mexicans;
- 26.7% of US-born Mexican men and 28.1% of US-born Mexican women were married to non-Hispanic whites; and
- 13.6% of US-born Mexican men and 17.4% of US-born Mexican women were married to Mexico-born Mexicans.

In addition, based on 2000 data, there is a significant amount of ethnic absorption of ethnic Mexicans into the mainstream population with 16% of the children of mixed marriages not being identified in the census as Mexican.

A study done by the National Research Council (US) Panel on Hispanics in the United States published in 2006 looked at not only marriages, but also non-marriage unions. It found that since at least 1980, marriage for females across all Hispanic ethnic groups, including Mexican Americans, has been in a steady decline. In addition, the percentage of births to unmarried mothers increased for females of Mexican descent from 20.3% in 1980 to 40.8% in 2000, more than doubling in that time frame. The study also found that for females of all Hispanic ethnicities, including Mexican origin, "considerably fewer births to unmarried Latino mothers involve partnerships with non-Latino white males than is the case for married Latino mothers. Second, births outside marriage are more likely to involve a non-Latino black father than births within marriage." Additionally, "Unions among partners from different Latino origins or between Latino and non-Latino blacks are considerably more evident in cohabitation and parenthood than they are in marriage. In particular, unions between Latinos and non-Latino blacks are prominent in parenthood, especially non-marital births." Furthermore, for 29.7% of unmarried births to native-born females of Mexican origin and 40% of unmarried births to females of "Other Latino" origin, which may include Mexican American, information on the father's ethnicity was missing. The study was supported by the US Census Bureau, among other sources.

=== Double-Marginalization ===
Two marginalized identities has a bigger impact on the oppression and struggles that the oppressed face. This is specially true in the case of women and immigrants. The level of education and the cultural factors directly effect women facing domestic violence, and women with lower levels of literacy have a higher vulnerability in facing abuse.

== Segregation issues ==
=== Housing market practices ===
Studies have shown that the segregation among Mexican Americans and Mexican immigrants seems to be declining. One study from 1984 found that Mexican American applicants were offered the same housing terms and conditions as non-Hispanic white Americans. They were asked to provide the same information (regarding employment, income, credit checks, etc.) and asked to meet the same general qualifications of their non-Hispanic white peers. In this same study, it was found that Mexican Americans were more likely than non-Hispanic white Americans to be asked to pay a security deposit or application fee and Mexican American applicants were also more likely to be placed onto a waiting list than non-Latino white applicants.

=== Battle of Chavez Ravine ===
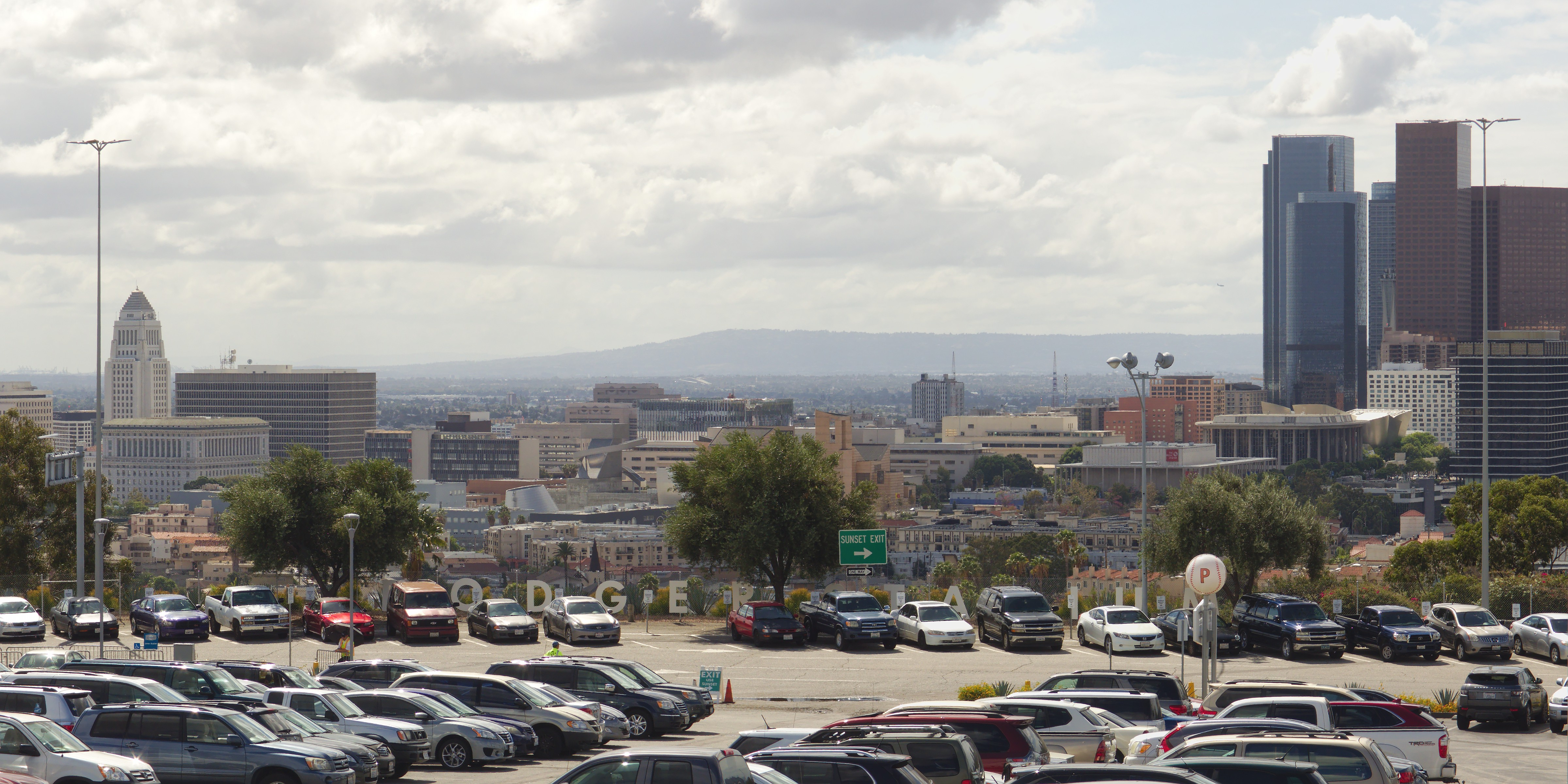
View of downtown and the Palos Verdes Peninsula

The Battle of Chavez Ravine has several meanings, but often refers to controversy surrounding government acquisition of land largely owned by Mexican Americans in Los Angeles' Chavez Ravine over approximately ten years (1951–1961). The eventual result was the removal of the entire population of Chavez Ravine from land on which Dodger Stadium was later constructed. The great majority of the Chavez Ravine land was acquired to make way for proposed public housing. The public housing plan that had been advanced as politically "progressive" and had resulted in the removal of the Mexican American landowners of Chavez Ravine, was abandoned after passage of a public referendum prohibiting the original housing proposal and election of a conservative Los Angeles mayor opposed to public housing. Years later, the land acquired by the government in Chavez Ravine was dedicated by the city of Los Angeles as the site of what is now Dodger Stadium.

=== Hispanic segregation versus Black segregation ===
Viramontes' childhood neighborhood was divided by the East LA interchange in the early 1960s. The novel Their Dogs Came with Them focuses on the freeway construction and difficult conditions for the Mexican Americans living in this area at the time.

When comparing the contemporary segregation of Mexican Americans to that of Black Americans, some scholars claim that "Hispanic segregation is less severe and fundamentally different from Black residential segregation." suggesting that the segregation faced by Latinos is more likely to be due to factors such as lower socioeconomic status and immigration while the segregation of African Americans is more likely to be due to larger issues of the history of racism in the US.

Legally, Mexican Americans could vote and hold elected office, however, it was not until the creation of organizations such as the League of United Latin America Citizens and the G.I. Forum that Mexican Americans began to achieve political influence. Edward Roybal's election to the Los Angeles City Council in 1949 and then to Congress in 1962 also represented this rising Mexican American political power. In the late 1960s the founding of the Crusade for Justice in Denver in and the land grant movement in New Mexico in 1967 set the bases for what would become the Chicano (Mexican American) nationalism. The 1968 Los Angeles school walkouts expressed Mexican American demands to end segregation, increase graduation rates, and reinstate a teacher fired for supporting student organizing. A notable event in the Chicano movement was the 1972 Convention of La Raza Unida (United People) Party, which organized with the goal of creating a third party that would give Chicanos political power in the United States.

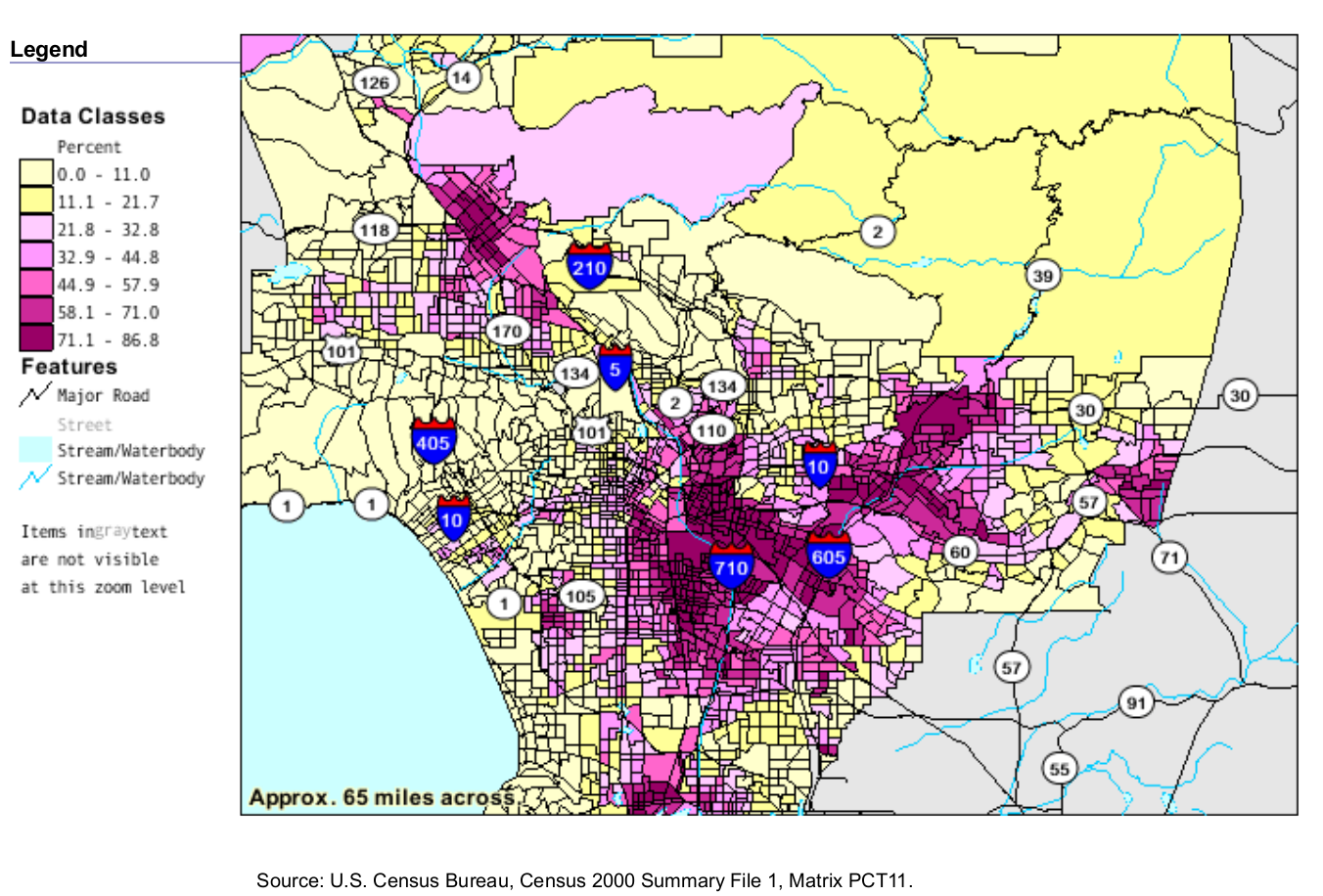
Map of Los Angeles County showing percentage of population self-identified as Mexican in ancestry or national origin by census tracts. Heaviest concentrations are in East Los Angeles, Echo Park/Silver Lake, South Los Angeles and San Pedro/Wilmington.

In the past, Mexicans were legally considered "White" because either they were considered to be of full Spanish heritage, or because of early treaty obligations to Spaniards and Mexicans that conferred citizenship status to Mexican peoples at a time when whiteness was a prerequisite for US citizenship. Although Mexican Americans were legally classified as "White" in terms of official federal policy, many organizations, businesses, and homeowners associations and local legal systems had official policies to exclude Mexican Americans. Throughout the southwest discrimination in wages were institutionalized in "white wages" versus lower "Mexican wages" for the same job classifications. For Mexican Americans, opportunities for employment were largely limited to guest worker programs. The bracero program, which began in 1942 and officially ended in 1964, allowed them temporary entry into the United States as migrant workers in farms throughout California and the Southwest.

Mexican Americans legally classified as "White", following anti-miscegenation laws in most western states until the 1960s, could not legally marry African or Asian Americans (See Perez v. Sharp). However, most were not socially considered white, and therefore, according to Historian Neil Foley in the book The White Scourge: Mexicans, Blacks, and Poor Whites in Texas Cotton Culture, Mexicans and Mexican-Americans did marry non-whites typically without reprisal.

Despite the similarities between Mexican American and African American patterns of segregation, there were important differences. The racial demarcations between whites and blacks in a state like Texas were inviolable, whereas those between whites and Mexican Americans were not. It was possible for Mexican Americans to attend white schools and colleges, mix socially with whites and marry whites: all of these things were impossible for African Americans, largely due to the legalized nature of black-white segregation. Racial segregation was rarely as rigid for Mexican Americans as it was for African Americans, even in situations where African Americans enjoyed higher economic status than Mexican Americans.

=== Segregated schools ===
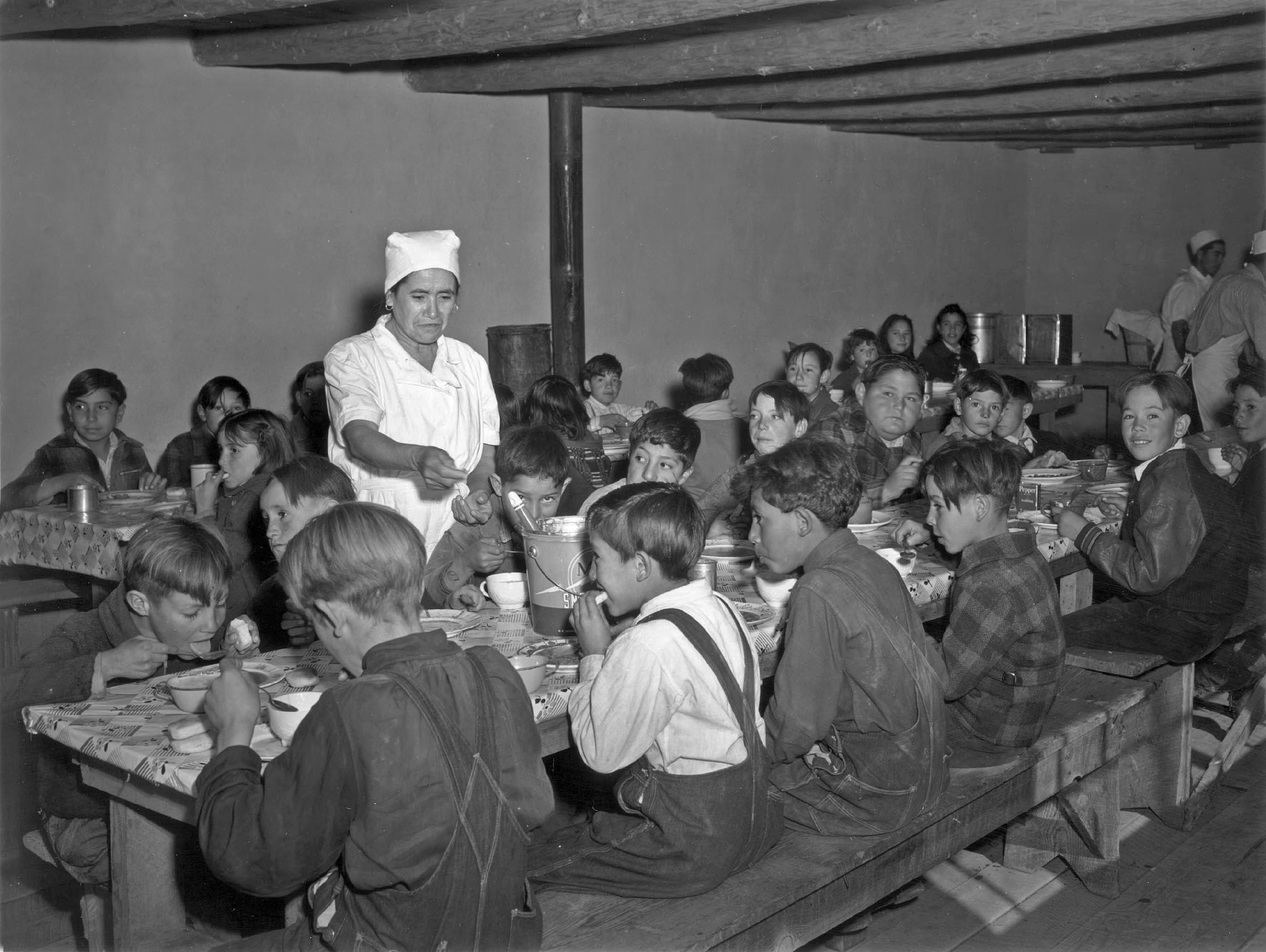
Mendez v. Westminster was a 1947 federal court case that challenged Mexican remedial schools in Orange County, California. In its ruling, the United States Court of Appeals for the Ninth Circuit, in an en banc decision, held that the forced segregation of Mexican American students into separate "Mexican schools" was unconstitutional and unlawful because Mexicans were white. It was the first ruling in the United States in favor of desegregation.

In the 1940s in Texas, Mexican American children were at times forced to register at "Mexican schools", where classroom conditions were poor, the school year was shorter, and the quality of education was substandard.

Various reasons for the inferiority of the education given to Mexican American students have been listed by James A. Ferg-Cadima including: inadequate resources, poor equipment, unfit building construction. In 1923, the Texas Education Survey Commission found that the school year for some non-white groups was 1.6 months shorter than the average school year. Some have interpreted the shortened school year as a "means of social control" implementing policies to ensure that Mexican Americans would maintain the unskilled labor force required for a strong economy. A lesser education would serve to confine Mexican Americans to the bottom rung of the social ladder. By limiting the number of days that Mexican Americans could attend school and allotting time for these same students to work, in mainly agricultural and seasonal jobs, the prospects for higher education and upward mobility were slim.

=== Immigration and segregation ===
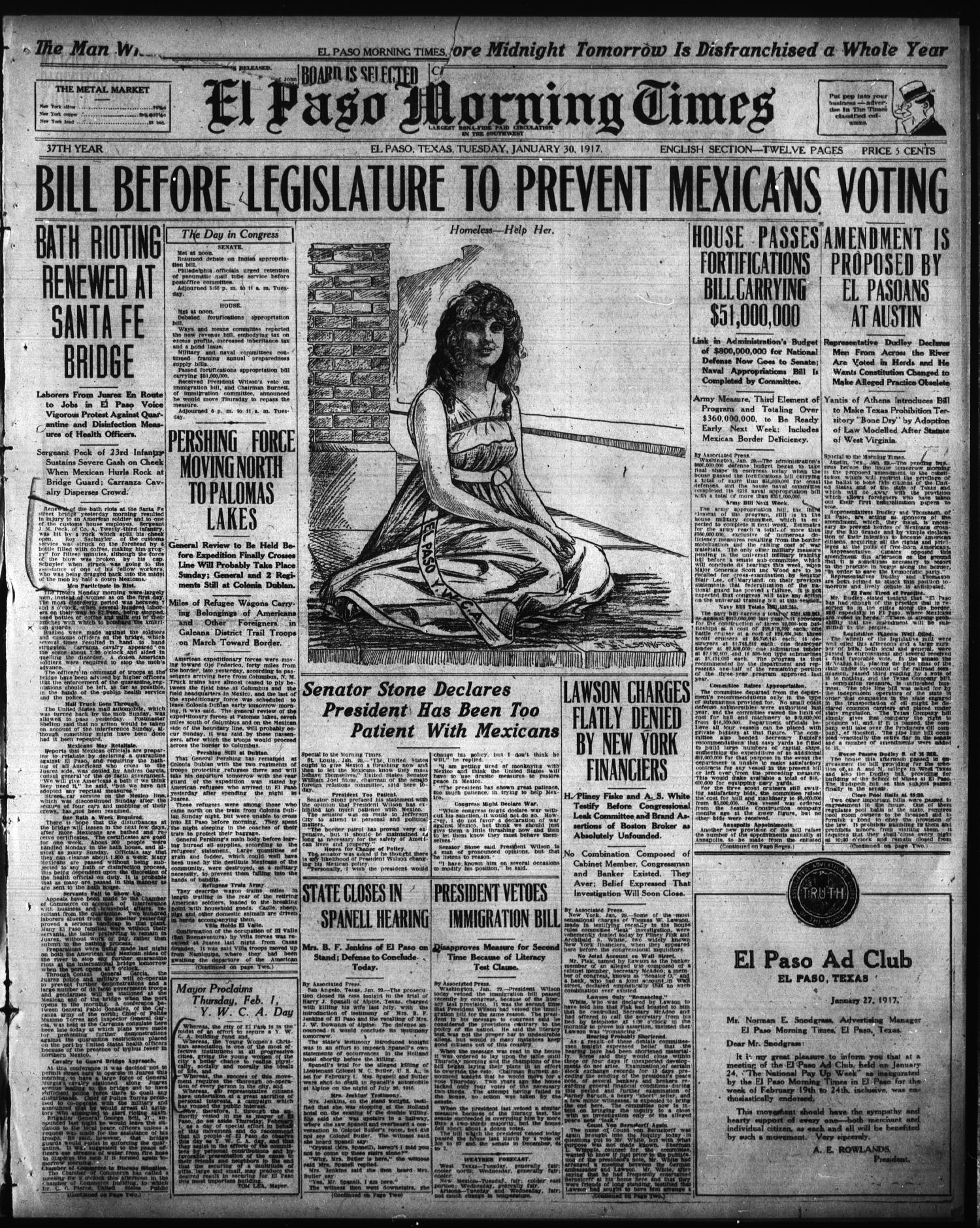
El Paso Morning Times newspaper January 30, 1917, headlinedː "Bill Before Legislature to Prevent Mexicans Voting" depicts the 1917 Bath riots begun by Carmelita Torres at the Santa Fe International Bridge disinfecting plant at the El Paso, Texas and Juarez, Mexico border.

Historically, immigrants first settled in immigration hubs, where immigrants of similar background settle after they first arrive to the United States. Although they are segregated from the general population, hubs have helped many immigrants to acclimate to the United States, learn English, accumulate wealth, and once they are established, move into mainstream society.

This model of immigration and residential segregation, explained above, is the model which has historically been accurate in describing the experiences of Latino immigrants. However, the patterns of immigration seen today no longer follows this model. This old model is termed the standard spatial assimilation model. More contemporary models are the polarization model and the diffusion model: The spatial assimilation model posits that as immigrants would live within this country's borders, they would simultaneously become more comfortable in their new surroundings, their socioeconomic status would rise, and their ability to speak English would increase. The combination of these changes would allow for the immigrant to move out of the barrio and into the dominant society. This type of assimilation reflects the experiences of immigrants of the early twentieth century.

Polarization model suggests that the immigration of non-black minorities into the United States further separates blacks and whites, as though the new immigrants are a buffer between them. This creates a hierarchy in which blacks are at the bottom, whites are at the top, and other groups fill the middle. In other words, the polarization model posits that Asians and Hispanics are less segregated than their African-American peers because white American society would rather live closer to Asians or Latinos than African-Americans.

The diffusion model has also been suggested as a way of describing the immigrant's experience within the United States. This model is rooted in the belief that as time passes, more and more immigrants enter the country. This model suggests that as the United States becomes more populated with a more diverse set of peoples, stereotypes and discriminatory practices will decrease, as awareness and acceptance increase. The diffusion model predicts that new immigrants will break down old patterns of discrimination and prejudice, as one becomes more and more comfortable with the more diverse neighborhoods that are created through the influx of immigrants. Applying this model to the experiences of Mexican Americans forces one to see Mexican American immigrants as positive additions to the "American melting pot", in which as more additions are made to the pot, the more equal and accepting society will become.

== The Chicano movement and the Chicano Moratorium ==
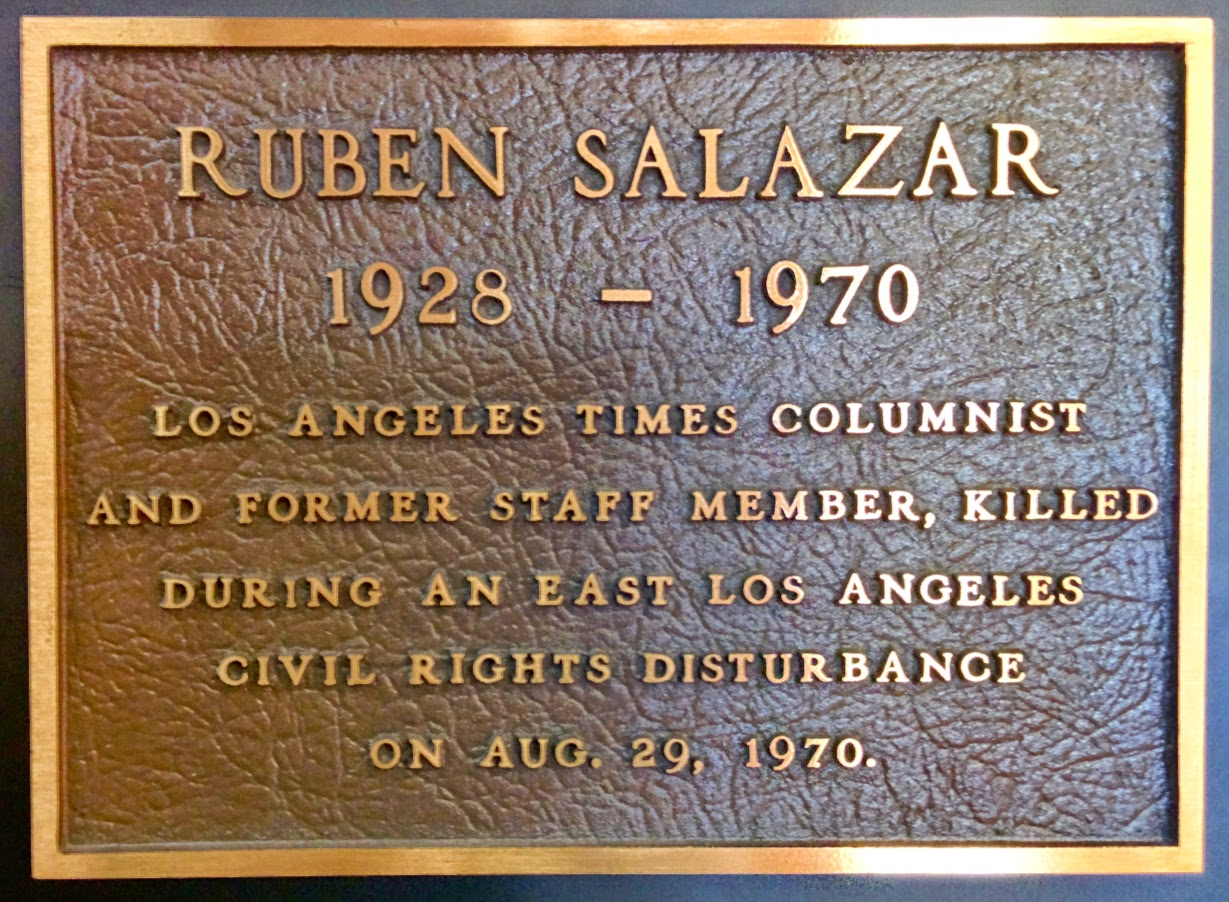
A plaque honoring Ruben Salazar mounted in the Globe Lobby of the Los Angeles Times Building in downtown Los Angeles

The Chicano Moratorium, formally known as the National Chicano Moratorium Committee, was a movement of Chicano anti-war activists that built a broad-based but fragile coalition of Mexican-American groups to organize opposition to the Vietnam War. The committee was led by activists from local colleges and members of the "Brown Berets", a group with roots in the high school student movement that staged walkouts in 1968, known as the East L.A. walkouts, also called "blowouts".

The best known historical fact of the Moratorium was the death of Rubén Salazar, known for his reporting on civil rights and police brutality. The official story is that Salazar was killed by a tear gas canister fired by a member of the Los Angeles County Sheriff's Department into the Silver Dollar Café at the conclusion of the National Chicano Moratorium March.

== Education ==
=== Parental Involvement ===
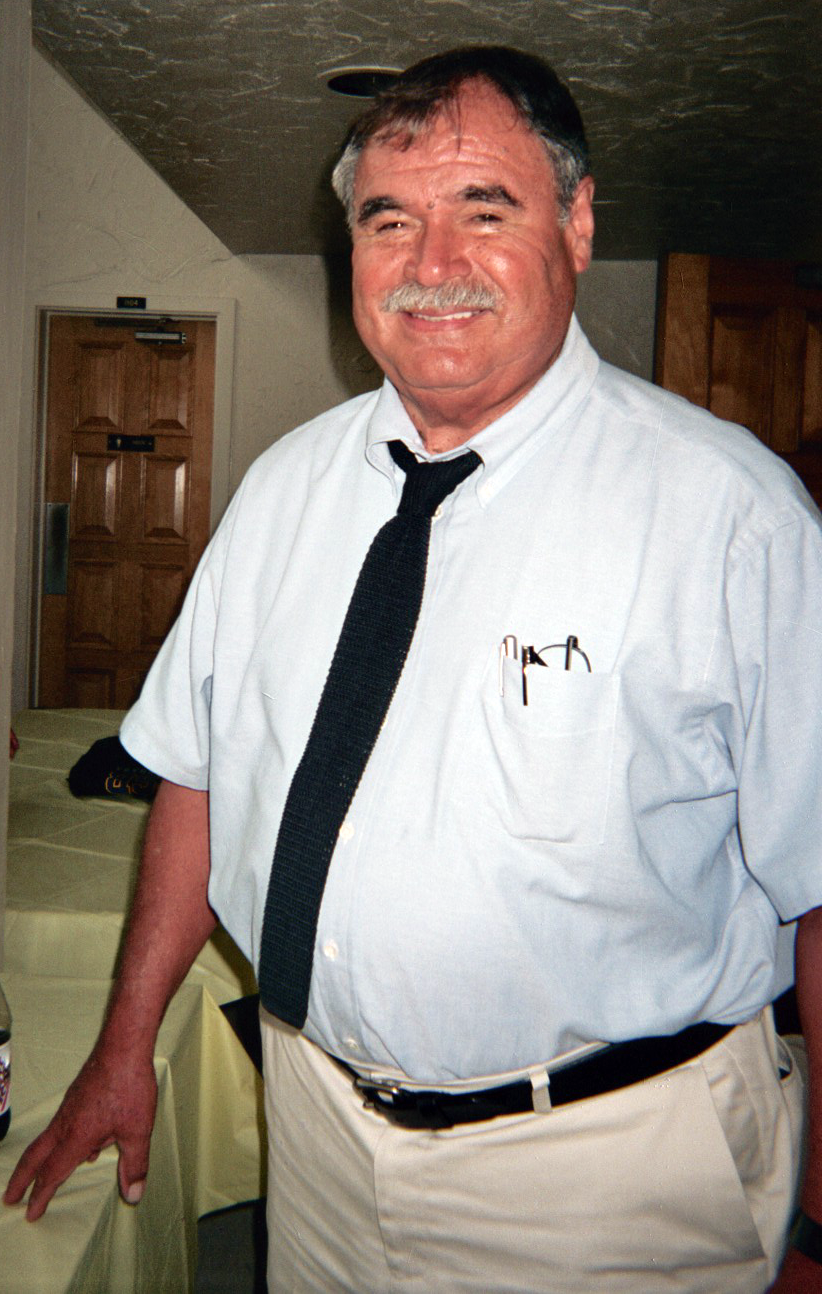
Sal Castro was a Mexican-American educator and activist. He was most well known for his role in the 1968 East L.A. walkouts. See Walkout (film).

For a long time, there has been a misconception that the parents of Mexican American students are not involved in their children's education; however, multiple studies have demonstrated that parents are involved in their children's education (Valencia & Black, 2002). It is important to know that the parents of Mexican American students frequently display their involvement through untraditional methods; such as, consejos, home-base practices, and high academic expectations.

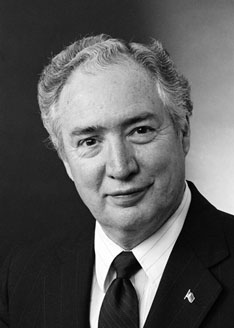
Lauro Cavazos, Secretary of Education from August 1988 to December 1990

Literature has demonstrated that parental involvement has had a positive influence in the academic achievement of Mexican American students. Studies have shown that Mexican families show their value towards education by using untraditional methods (Kiyama, 2011). One educational practice that is commonly used among Mexican families are consejos (advice). Additional research has supported the idea that parents' consejos have had a significant influence on the education of Mexican American students. Espino (2016) studied the influence that parental involvement had on seven, 1st generation Mexican American PhDs. The study found that one of the participant's father would frequently use consejos to encourage his son to continue his education. The father's consejos served as an encouragement tool, which motivated the participant to continue his education. Consejos are commonly associated with the parents' occupation. Parents use their occupation as leverage to encourage their child to continue his or her education, or else they may end up working an undesirable job (Espino, 2016). While this might not be the most common form of parental involvement, studies have shown that it has been an effective tool that encourages Mexican American students. Although that might be an effective tool for Mexican American students, a mother can be just as an important figure for consejos. A mother's role teaches their child the importance of everyday tasks such as knowing how to cook, clean and care for oneself to be independent and also to help out around the house. The children of single mothers have a huge impact on their children in pushing them to be successful in school to have a better life than what they provided to their children. Most single mothers live in poverty and are dependent of the government, so they want the best for their children so they are always encouraging their children to be focused and do their best.

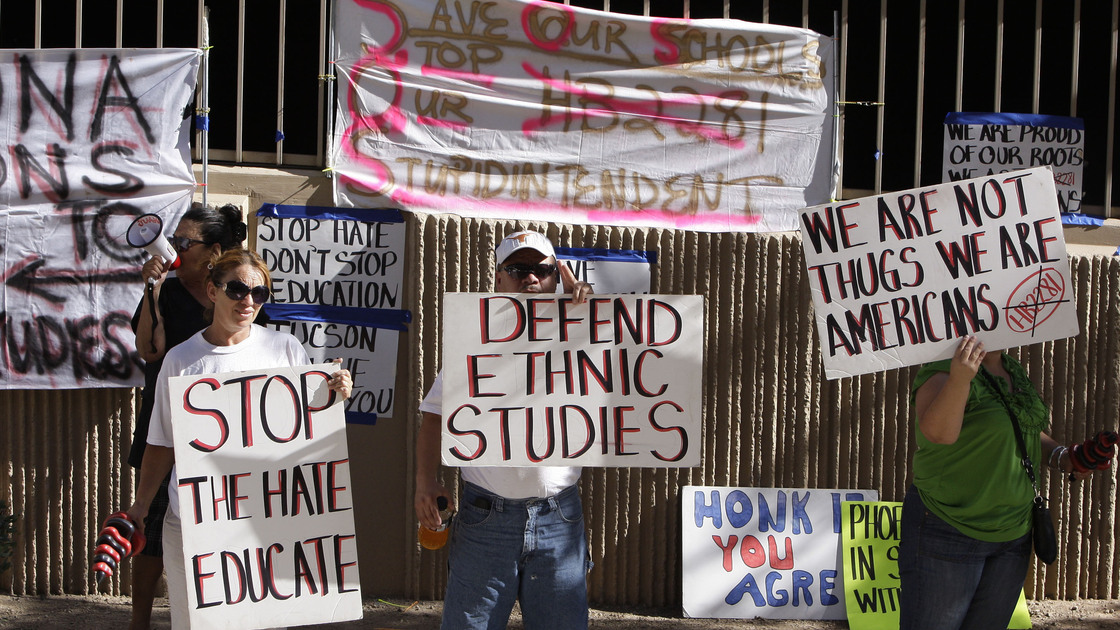
Protesters are seen in June 2011 in support of the Tucson Unified School District's Mexican-American studies program. A new state law HB2281 effectively ended the program, saying it was divisive.

Another study emphasized the importance of home-based parental involvement. Altschul (2011) conducted a study that tested the effects of six different types of parental involvement and their effect on Mexican American students. The study used previous data from the National Education Longitudinal Study (NELS) of 1988. The data was used to evaluate the influence of parental practices in the 8th grade and their effect on students once they were in the 10th grade. Altschul (2011) noted that home-based parental involvement had a more positive effect on the academic achievement of Mexican American students, than involvement in school organizations. The literature suggests that parental involvement in the school setting is not necessary, parents can impact the academic achievement of their children from their home.

Additional literature has demonstrated that parent involvement also comes in the form of parent expectations. Valencia and Black (2002) argued that Mexican parents place a significant amount of value on education and hold high expectations for their children. The purpose of their study was to debunk the notion that Mexicans do not value education by providing evidence that shows the opposite. Setting high expectations and expressing their desire for their children to be academically successful has served as powerful tools to increase of the academic achievement among Mexican American students (Valencia & Black, 2002). Keith and Lichtman (1995) also conducted a research study that measured the influence of parental involvement and academic achievement. The data was collected from the NELS and used a total of 1,714 students that identified as Mexican American (Chicana/o). The study found a higher level of academic achievement among 8th grade Mexican American students and parents who had high educational aspirations for their children (Keith & Lichtman, 1995).

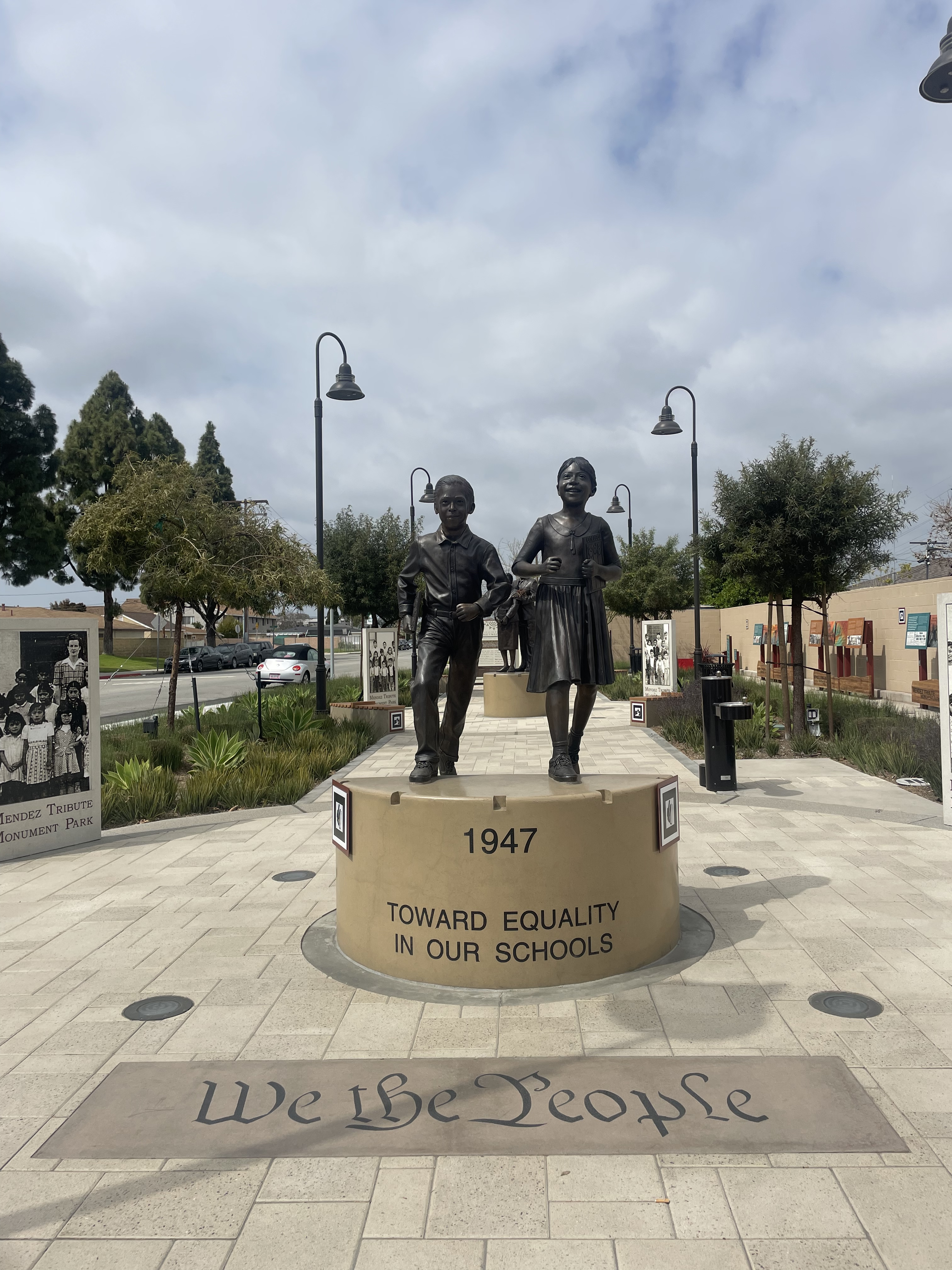
Sylvia Mendez Historic Freedom Trail and Monument

Additional research done by Carranza, You, Chhuon, and Hudley (2009) added support to the idea that high parental expectations were associated with higher achievement levels among Mexican American students. Carranza et al. (2009) studied 298 Mexican American high school students. They studied whether perceived parental involvement, acculturation, and self-esteem had any effect on academic achievement and aspirations. Results from their study demonstrated that perceived parental involvement had an influence on the students' academic achievement and aspirations. Additionally, Carranza et al. noted that among females, those who perceived that their parents expected them to get good grades tended to study more and have higher academic aspirations (2009). The findings suggest that parental expectations can affect the academic performance of Mexican American students.

Stand and Deliver was an inductee of the 2011 National Film Registry list. The National Film Board said that it was "one of the most popular of a new wave of narrative feature films produced in the 1980s by Latino filmmakers" and that it "celebrates in a direct, approachable, and impactful way, values of self-betterment through hard work and power through knowledge."

== Mexican American communities ==
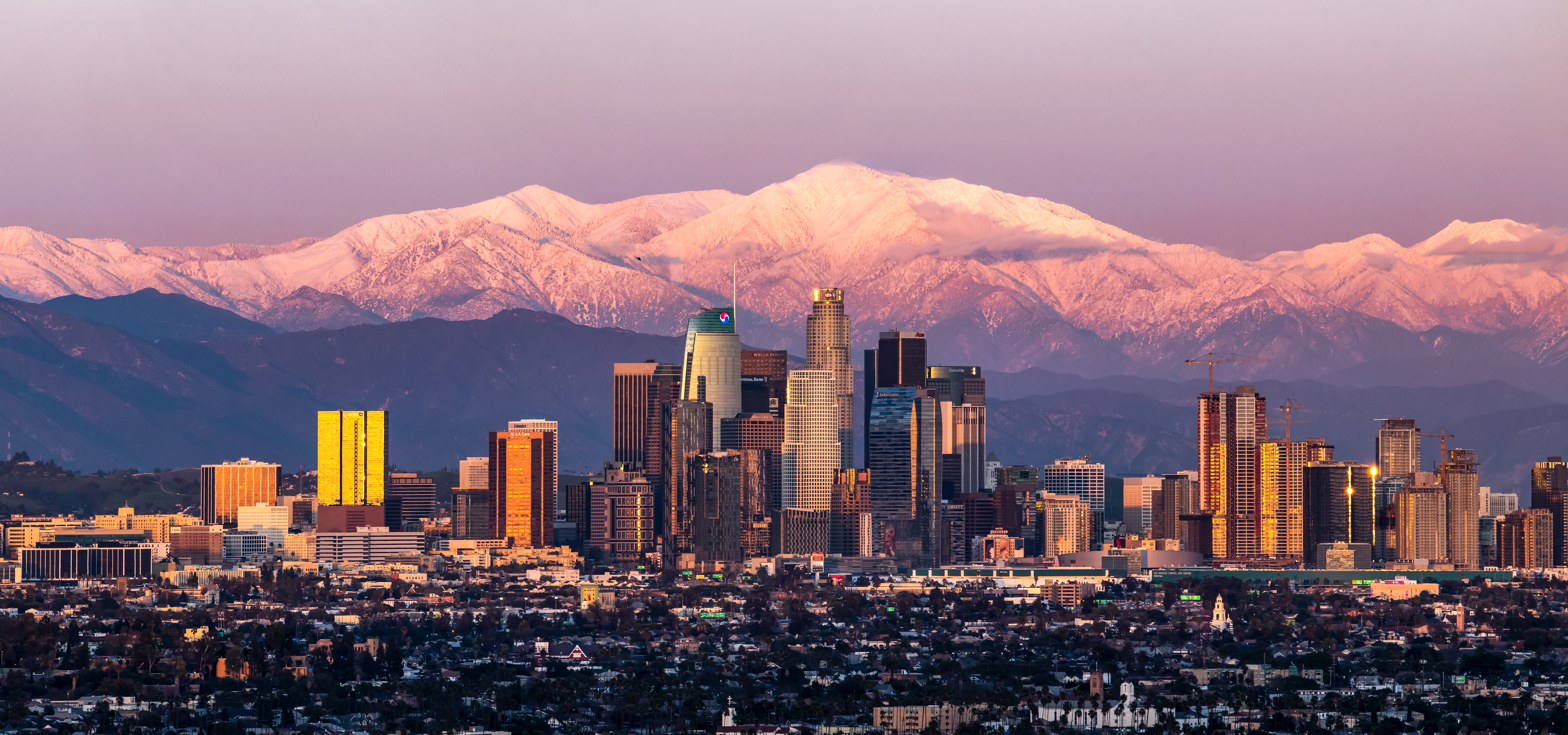
Los Angeles attracts Mexican American immigrants because of its rich Spanish and Mexican architecture, history and culture.

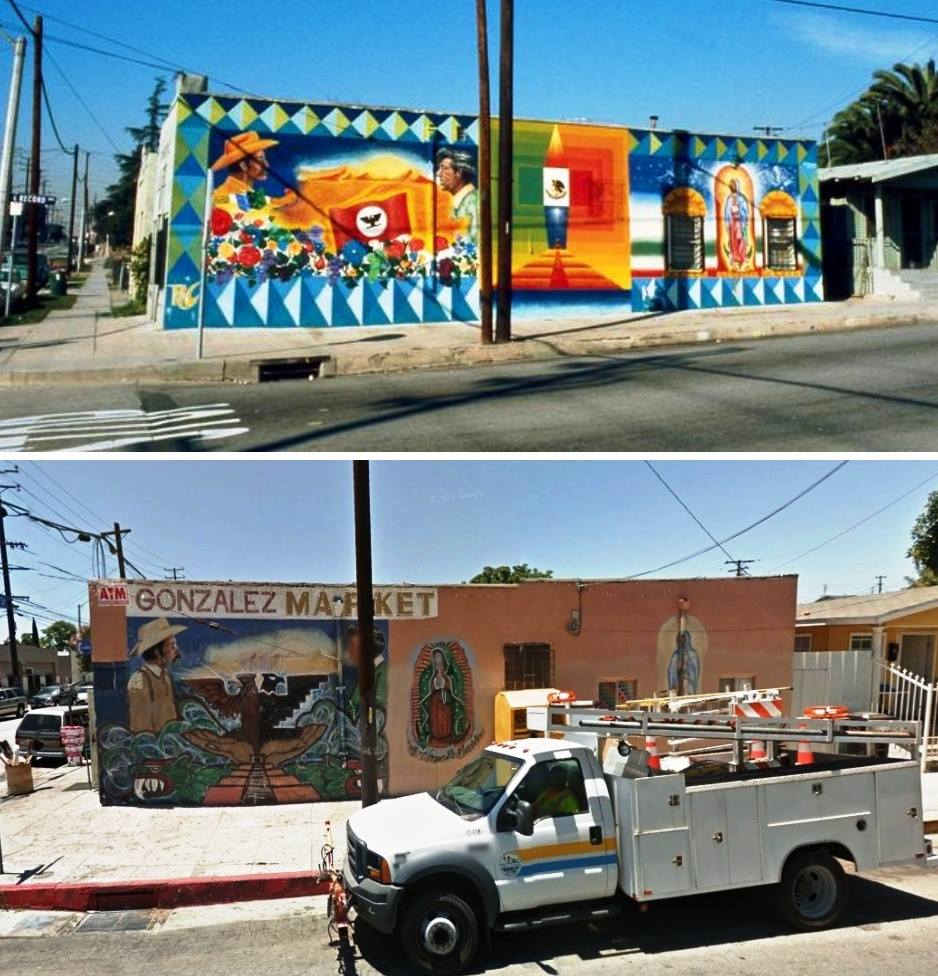
City Terrace streets

Large Mexican American populations by both size and per capita exist in the following American counties, metropolitan areas, and cities:

=== Arizona ===
- Phoenix – Fifth-largest Mexican-American population.
- Tucson – 30% of the almost 1 million people in the metro area.
- Arizona border: 80% Santa Cruz County, which includes Nogales, is Mexican-American, while more than 100,000 Mexican-Americans reside in and around Yuma close to the Mexican border.

=== California ===
- Southern California around Los Angeles has the highest absolute number of Mexican-Americans of any region in the country. The city proper is home to over 1.2 million of Mexican ancestry, another 2.3 million throughout Los Angeles County, and a total of about 6.3 million in the five-county Greater Los Angeles Area. Unsurprisingly, it has the largest Mexican American population in the United States. (according to the 2010 census, L.A. is now 31.9% of Mexican descent with numerous Central American national groups).
  - East Los Angeles, California – Unincorporated community of roughly 130,000, name synonymous with Mexican Americans, 97% Hispanic, 88% of Mexicans are immigrant, 40% of east L.A. residents reportedly Mexican including American-born. Neighborhoods in the City of Los Angeles east of the Los Angeles River, such as Boyle Heights, El Sereno and Glassell Park are mostly Mexican-American.
    - Montebello, California – Over 62% of the population is Mexican.
  - Compton, California – Now predominately Mexican after the African American exodus. There is Latino and Black gang tensions in the city.
  - Culver City, California was the site of the infamous Zoot Suit riots in 1943, but it and other Westside communities have some of the lowest percentage of Mexican Americans in Los Angeles County despite the history of Chicanos.
  - South and Southeast Los Angeles are now predominately Latino (i.e. Salvadorans):
    - Long Beach, California – Third largest city in Southern California, one of many cities in the region with a large Mexican/Latin American population, 165,240 in 2021.
    - Pico Rivera and West Whittier-Los Nietos have long been historically Mexican-American, with their roots in the Jimtown shantytown.
    - South Gate, California – Over 70.77% of the population is Mexican or Mexican American. The nearby cities of Bell, Bell Gardens, Cudahy, Huntington Park, Lynwood, and Maywood are also mostly Mexican.
    - More than half of the populations of Downey and Whittier are of Mexican descent, many being transplants from East L.A. The two cities both lay claim to being the "Mexican Beverly Hills"
  - San Gabriel Valley – There is a large Mexican American community in San Gabriel Valley cities such as El Monte, Baldwin Park, Pomona and West Covina
    - La Puente, California – About three-quarters are of Mexican ancestry or Hispanic/Latino.
  - Palmdale, California and Lancaster, California of Antelope valley.
  - San Fernando Valley: 42 percent of the San Fernando Valley is Hispanic or Latino. Predominately Mexican-American communities include San Fernando, Pacoima and Panorama City.
  - Inland Empire, California (Riverside/ San Bernardino Counties- and the cities of that namesake) – About a third of the population are of Mexican descent. Including San Jacinto Valley and Romoland with high Mexican percentages.
    - Riverside, Adelanto, Hesperia, Victorville and Apple Valley in the Victor Valley, Ontario, Moreno Valley, Rialto and San Bernardino, Redlands and Fontana is the highest.
    - Indio and Coachella (primarily Mexican-American) in majority Latino Coachella Valley.
  - In 2021, there were over one million Mexican-American residents of Orange County, California or the largest ethnicity in the county.
    - Santa Ana – 78% Latino with the majority (223,010) being of Mexican descent.
    - Anaheim: 165,813 Mexican-Americans or nearly half of its population.
- San Diego, California – slightly less than one-third of the city's population is Latino, primarily Mexican American (354,079 in 2021), making it the lowest percentage of Latinos of any significant border city. Notable Mexican-American neighborhoods include Barrio Logan and San Ysidro, San Diego. Other San Diego area communities with significant Mexican-American populations include Chula Vista (152,973, 55.2%), Escondido (70,731, 46.9%) and National City (35,356, 63.2%) - see Chicano Park.
- Imperial Valley region (Imperial County, California, especially Calexico).
- San Francisco Bay Area – also with over one million Hispanics, many of whom are Mexican Americans, both US-born and foreign-born (see also Oakland about 10–20% Hispanic and San Francisco – the Mission District section- the city is 10–20% Hispanic).
  - East Palo Alto
  - Half Moon Bay
  - North Fair Oaks
  - Redwood City
  - Oakland – Many live in the Fruitvale district.
  - San José – Nearly one-third of the city's population is Mexican American or of Hispanic origin; San Jose has the largest Mexican American population within the Bay Area.
  - South San Francisco
- Central Valley of California both the Sacramento and San Joaquin Valleys have majority Mexican American communities. Examples being Sacramento and Fresno (248,031 Mexican-Americans) and the heaviest concentrations in Kern County, California around Bakersfield (184,262 Mexican-Americans) the tenth largest city in California.
  - Cities and communities that had at least 85% Mexican Americans in 2021 included San Joaquin (98.0%), Lost Hills (95.8%), Arvin (94.1%), Parlier (93.3%), Weedpatch (93.1%), Firebaugh (92.2%), Orange Cove (90.0%), Huron (88.6%), McFarland (87.8%), and Lamont (87.4%) the valley became majority Latino in 2000.
- Monterey County, which includes the Salinas Valley agricultural region, was approximately 55% Mexican-American in 2021. This includes 119,590 in the city Salinas and high concentrations in Gonzales, Greenfield, King City, and Soledad.
- Oxnard esp the Colonia neighborhood.

=== Colorado ===
- Denver – Colorado has the eighth largest population of Hispanics, seventh highest percentage of Latinos, fourth largest population of Mexican-Americans, and sixth highest percentage of Mexican-Americans in the United States. According to the 2010 census, there are over one million Mexican-Americans in Colorado. Over one-third of the city's population is Mexican-American or Latino, as well as approximately one-fourth of the entire Denver Metropolitan area. About 17% of the cities population is foreign born, mostly from Latin America.
- Greeley – Over one-third of the city's population is Hispanic, mostly Mexican-American.
  - Garden City is Hispanic majority and Evans has a very large Hispanic population as well.
- Southern Colorado is home to many communities of Hispanics descended from Mexican settlers who arrived during Spanish colonial times. Roughly half of Pueblo's population is Latino, mostly Mexican-American. Many other towns in southern Colorado have high proportions of Mexican-Americans. La Junta, Rocky Ford, Las Animas, Lamar, Walsenburg and Trinidad all have large Mexican American communities.
  - San Luis Valley – The San Luis Valley has many towns with large Mexican-American populations. Antonito, Blanca, Center, Del Norte, Fort Garland, Monte Vista and Romeo are all Hispanic majority.

=== Illinois ===
- Illinois – As of 2021, the state has 1.76 million people of full or partial Mexican ancestry (13.9% of the state population)
  - Chicago metropolitan area – As of 2021, nearly 1.69 million people or 17.8% of the metro population (which includes Racine and Kenosha counties in Wisconsin and Lake and Porter counties in Indiana). After Los Angeles, Chicagoland is the second-largest Mexican American Metropolitan area.
  - Cook County – As of 2021, 1,032,984 people or 20.0% of the county population, the most populous county in the state.
    - Chicago – As of 2021, 571,577 people or 21.2% of the city population, largest Mexican population outside of the Southwest region. Mexicans represent almost 80% of the Latinos in Chicago.
    - Cicero – As of 2021, 67,434 people or 79.42% of the city population, the largest Mexican ancestry majority city in the state
  - Dupage County – As of 2021, 98,864 people or 10.7% of the county population, the second-most populous county in the state.
  - Kane County – As of 2021, 140,682 people or 27.1% of the county population, the fifth-most populous county in the state.
    - Aurora – As of 2021, 67,498 people or 36.8% of the city population.
    - Elgin – As of 2021, 46,467 people or 40.7% of the city population.
  - Lake County – As of 2021, 127,648 people or 18.0% of the county population, the third-most populous county in the state.
    - Waukegan – As of 2021, 40,229 people or 44.8% of the city population.
  - Will County – As of 2021, 105,266 people or 15.1% of the county population, the fourth-most populous county in the state.

=== Indiana ===
- Lake County – As of 2021, 74,884 people or 15.1% of the county population, the second-most populous county in the state.

=== Nevada ===
- Reno
- Henderson
- Sparks
- Elko
- Mesquite

=== Texas ===
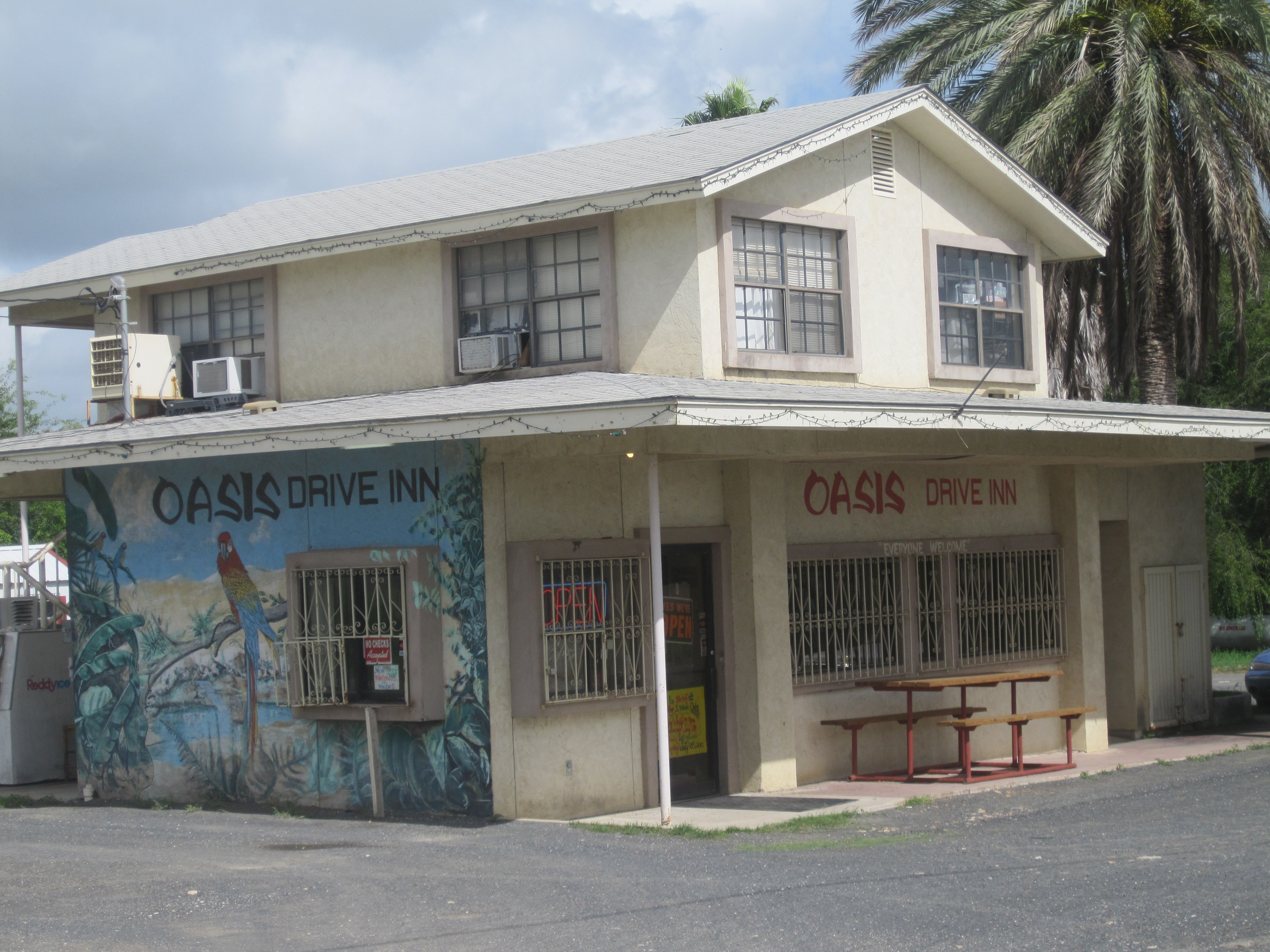
Oasis Drive Inn with mural of a scarlet macaw on US Highway 83 in Crystal City, Texas

- Dallas/Fort Worth Area – Fifth-largest Mexican-American population and over 1.75 million Mexicans in the Dallas–Fort Worth Metroplex (third-largest foreign born Mexican population in the US per MSA).
- San Antonio, Texas – Over half of the population in the city proper (53.2%, 705,530) and second largest Mexican population of any city in the US. 53% of San Antonio is of Mexican descent, highest percentage of any city with a population of over 1 million. About 1.2 million Mexicans live in Greater San Antonio, just under half the area's population.
- The Rio Grande Valley and South Texas – Heavily populated by Mexican-Americans, who are the ethnic majority, in a region spanning from Laredo to Corpus Christi (247,917 Mexicans in the metro, about 59% of the total population) to Brownsville.
  - El Paso – Largest Mexican-American community bordering a state of Mexico. 74% of El Paso is of Mexican descent, highest percentage of any city with a population of over 500k. There are 674,968 Mexicans in the El Paso area.
  - In 2021, it was estimated that 88% of the bordering McAllen–Edinburg–Mission metropolitan area (Hidalgo County), which includes McAllen and Edinburg, was Mexican-American, which translates to 766,626 Mexican-Americans
  - Laredo – The largest Mexican-American community bordering Nuevo Laredo, Mexico. The majority of Laredo speaks Spanish as their first language.
  - Brownsville, Texas – The Hispanic population of Brownsville is 94.6% due to its proximity to the Mexico border. 361,595 Mexican-Americans live in the Brownsville area
  - Eagle Pass area: 52,740 Mexicans, 91% of the population.
- Houston, Texas – Third-largest Mexican ancestry community in the United States. 1,922,721 people live in Metro Houston (about 27% of the population), including 693, 807 in city of Houston proper.
- San Angelo with other areas of West Texas, home to Tejanos. Many areas of West Texas are one-third or more Latino.
- Greater Austin is home to 587,289 Mexican Americans, about 26% of the population.

=== Wisconsin ===
- Milwaukee County – As of 2021, 97,796 people or 10.5% of the county population.
  - Milwaukee city – As of 2021, 77,354 people or 13.4% of the city population.

=== Other states ===
- Las Vegas, Nevada – 70% of Hispanics that are eligible to vote in Nevada are Mexican
  - North Las Vegas – 30.14% Mexican
- The Yakima Valley and Tri-Cities, Washington – This region of Washington contains many communities of Mexican-American majority thanks to high demand for agricultural labor.
- New York City – Mexicans are the third largest Hispanic ethnic group after Puerto Ricans and Dominicans. New York City's Mexican population ranked 11th among major American cities in 2000 at 186,872.
- Oklahoma – Oklahoma City and Tulsa have sizable growing Mexican populations.
- Atlanta – Atlanta has a sizable Mexican population. Mexicans are the largest Hispanic ethnic group in Atlanta. Mexicans are concentrated in Gwinnett County.
- New Orleans – Mexicans are one of the largest Hispanic groups in New Orleans following Hondurans.
- Kansas – There is a large Mexican American presence in Kansas.
- Detroit – In the early 1900s, many Mexican American families moved to Michigan and Detroit. The epicenter of Detroit's Mexican American community is Mexicantown.
- New Jersey - The North Jersey region (nicknamed "Puebla Jersey" by migrants) is home to Mexican migrants, primarily from the states of Puebla and Oaxaca, and their descendants. The largest Mexican community is found in the city of Passaic, where Mexicans began to arrive in the 1970s to work in mills and roughly a quarter of the city's population is of Mexican origin. Other cities with significant Mexican populations include New Brunswick, Wildwood and Bridgeton.
- Bridgeport and New Haven, Connecticut have the 1st and 3rd largest Mexican populations in the New England region respectively in 2020 (alongside Boston at #2), despite being much smaller cities. The Mexican population of these respective cities began to grow in the 1990s from the tens into the hundreds, to around 8,000 each by 2020. New Haven has thousands of migrants from Tlaxcala (some of whom are reported Nahuatl speakers), where New Haven is the primary destination for migrants. Mexicans are the second largest Hispanic group in both cities, but in both they are heavily outnumbered by Puerto Ricans (Bridgeport has the 7th largest Puerto Rican community in the US), there they outnumber Mexicans roughly 4:1 there. Mexicans are the largest groups in the West End and North Hollow census tracts of Bridgeport, while in New Haven they are the largest national origin group in East Fair Haven.

=== Other US destinations ===
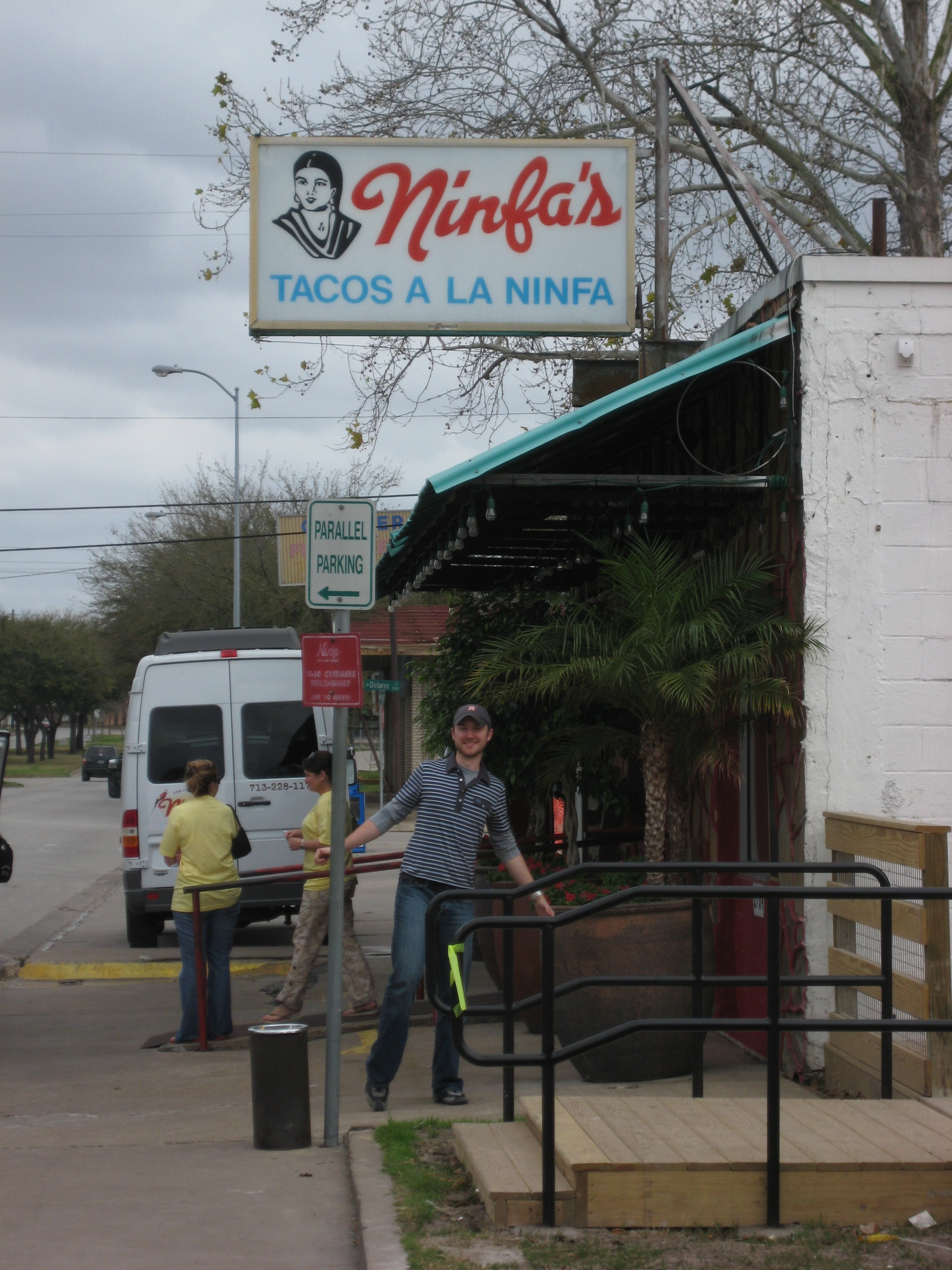
Original Ninfa's on Navigation Boulevard, established by Ninfa Laurenzo

Major cities like Boise, Idaho; Oklahoma City, Oklahoma; Kansas City, Kansas; Detroit, Michigan; Milwaukee, Wisconsin; Portland, Oregon; Salt Lake City, Utah; Seattle, Washington and Minneapolis, Minnesota have a large Mexican-American population.

=== US states by Mexican American population ===
State/Territory	Mexican American Population (2020 census)	Percentage
Alabama	148,193	2.9%
Alaska	25,177	3.4%
Arizona	1,842,769	25.7%
Arkansas	171,732	5.6%
California	12,202,347	30.8%
Colorado	874,342	15.1%
Connecticut	59,453	1.6%
Delaware	37,201	3.7%
District of Columbia	13,263	1.9%
Florida	707,301	3.2%
(Georgia (U.S. state)) Georgia	570,149	5.3%
Hawaii	42,941	2.9%
Idaho	189,489	10.2%
Illinois	1,768,747	13.8%
Indiana	374,854	5.5%
Iowa	148,097	4.6%
Kansas	290,747	9.8%
Kentucky	105,469	2.3%
Louisiana	103,872	2.0%
Maine	7,167	0.5%
Maryland	112,886	1.8%
Massachusetts	51,646	0.7%
Michigan	381,337	3.7%
Minnesota	214,435	3.7%
Mississippi	56,688	1.9%
Missouri	187,563	3.0%
Montana	28,347	2.6%
Nebraska	159,907	8.1%
Nevada	629,558	20.2%
New Hampshire	10,102	0.7%
New Jersey	252,172	2.7%
New Mexico	671,552	31.7%
New York	496,747	2.4%
North Carolina	563,929	5.3%
North Dakota	21,195	2.7%
Ohio	219,916	1.8%
Oklahoma	353,908	8.9%
Oregon	446,629	10.5%
Pennsylvania	159,722	1.2%
Rhode Island	11,317	1.0%
South Carolina	164,506	3.2%
South Dakota	20,450	2.3%
Tennessee	256,113	3.6%
Texas	9,031,289	30.9%
Utah	326,430	10.0%
Vermont	3,567	0.5%
Virginia	197,511	2.2%
Washington	783,668	10.1%
West Virginia	12,539	0.6%
Wisconsin	299,955	5.1%
Wyoming	41,891	7.2%
Total US	35,850,702	10.8%

=== Metropolitan areas with the largest Mexican populations ===
The largest populations of Mexicans are situated in the following metropolitan areas (Source: 2020 ACS 5-Year Estimates):

1. Los Angeles-Long Beach-Anaheim, CA MSA – 4,558,307
2. Riverside-San Bernardino, CA MSA – 2,046,226
3. Houston, TX MSA – 1,898,723
4. Dallas–Fort Worth, TX MSA – 1,758,882
5. Chicago-Joliet-Naperville, IL-IN-WI MSA – 1,639,211
6. Phoenix, AZ MSA – 1,310,764
7. San Antonio, TX MSA – 1,215,420
8. San Diego, CA MSA – 988,825
9. San Francisco–Oakland, CA MSA – 658,348
10. El Paso, TX MSA – 657,078

== Health ==
=== Diabetes ===
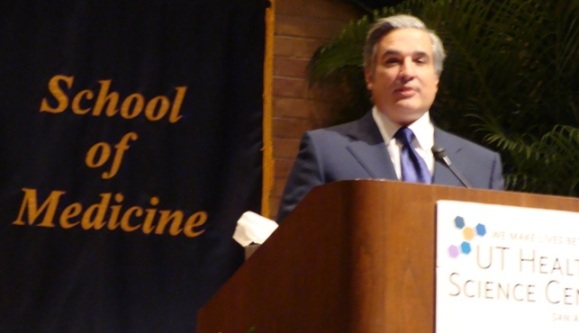
Francisco G. Cigarroa is a distinguished physician and academic leader who has made significant contributions to healthcare and medical education, particularly in Texas

Diabetes refers to a disease in which the body has an inefficiency of properly responding to insulin, which then affects the levels of glucose. The prevalence of diabetes in the United States is constantly rising. Common types of Diabetes are type 1 and type 2. Type 2 is the more common type of diabetes among Mexican Americans, and is constantly increasing due to poor diet habits. The increase of obesity results in an increase of type 2 diabetes among Mexican Americans in the United States. Mexican American men have higher prevalence rates in comparison to non-Latinos, whites and blacks. "The prevalence of diabetes increased from 8.9% in 1976–1980 to 12.3% in 1988–94 among adults aged 40 to 74" according to the third National Health and Nutrition Examination Survey, 1988–1994. In a 2014 study, The US Census Bureau estimates that by 2050, one in three people living in the United States will be of Latino origin including Mexican Americans. Type 2 diabetes prevalence is rising due to many risk factors and there are still many cases of pre-diabetes and undiagnosed diabetes due to lack of sources. According to the US Department of Health and Human Services (2011), individuals of Mexican descent are 50% more likely to die from diabetes than their white counterparts.

== See also ==
- Americans
- Mexicans
- Indigenous Mexican Americans
- Mexico–United States barrier
- Migrant deaths along the Mexico–United States border
- American immigration to Mexico
- Mexico–United States relations
- Hyphenated American
- Emigration from Mexico
- History of Mexican Americans in Los Angeles
- History of Mexican Americans in Texas
- History of Mexican Americans in Dallas–Fort Worth
- History of Mexican Americans in Houston
- History of Mexican Americans in Metro Detroit
- Mexicans in Chicago
- History of Mexican Americans in Tucson

Ethnic:

- Melting pot (metaphor for cultural fusion)
- Indigenous peoples of the Americas
- White Hispanic and Latino Americans
- White Mexicans
- Olive skin
- Mestizo
- Bronze (racial classification)
- Brown (racial classification)
- La raza cósmica
- Afro-Mexicans

Political:

- Reconquista (Mexico)
- Texan raids on New Mexico (1843)

Cultural:

- Chicanismo
- Chicano poetry
- Chicano nationalism
- List of Mexican-American writers
- El Pueblo de Los Ángeles Historical Monument
- Cholo (subculture)

Film:

- A Better Life
- Cesar Chavez (film)
- Fools Rush In (1997 film)
- From Prada to Nada
- La Bamba (film)
- Lowriders (film)
- McFarland, USA
- Spare Parts (2015 film)
- The Long Game (film)
- Tortilla Soup

== Bibliography/further reading ==
- Calderón, Héctor; Saldívar, José David (1991), "Editors' Introduction: Criticism in the Borderlands", in Calderón, Héctor; Saldívar, José David (eds.), Criticism in the Borderlands: Studies in Chicano Literature, Culture, and Ideology, Durham, North Carolina: Duke University Press, ISBN 978-0-8223-1143-0.
- Dolan, Jay P., and Gilberto M. Hinojosa, eds. Mexican Americans and the Catholic Church, 1900–1965 (Volume 1, "Notre Dame History of Hispanic Catholics in the U.S." series), (University of Notre Dame Press, 1994).
- Englekirk, Allan, and Marguerite Marín. "Mexican Americans." Gale Encyclopedia of Multicultural America, edited by Thomas Riggs, (3rd ed., vol. 3, Gale, 2014), pp. 195–217. online
- Gomez, Laura. Manifest Destinies: The Making of the Mexican American Race (New York UP, 2007). ISBN 978-0-8147-3174-1
- Gómez-Quiñones, Juan, and Irene Vásquez. Making Aztlán: Ideology and Culture of the Chicana and Chicano Movement, 1966–1977 (2014)
- MacDonald, Victoria-Maria, ed. Latino education in the United States: A narrated history from 1513–2000. (2000)
- Meier, Matt S.; Gutiérrez, Margo (2000). Encyclopedia of the Mexican American civil rights movement. Westport, CT: Greenwood. Archived from the original on October 4, 2014 – via Questia.
- Quiroz, Anthony (ed.), Leaders of the Mexican American Generation: Biographical Essays. Boulder, CO: University Press of Colorado, 2015.
- Orozco, Cynthia E. No Mexicans, women, or dogs allowed: The rise of the Mexican American civil rights movement (University of Texas Press, 2010) online
- Rosales, F. Arturo (1997). Chicano! The history of the Mexican American civil rights movement. Houston, TX: Arte Público Press. Archived from the original on February 4, 2013 – via Questia.
- Sánchez, George I (2006). "Ideology, and Whiteness in the Making of the Mexican American Civil Rights Movement, 1930–1960". Journal of Southern History. 72 (3): 569–604. doi:10.2307/27649149. JSTOR 27649149.

=== Primary sources ===
- Moquin, Wayne, and Charles Van Doren, eds. A documentary history of the Mexican Americans (1971) online
