= Cecilia Muñoz =

American political advisor

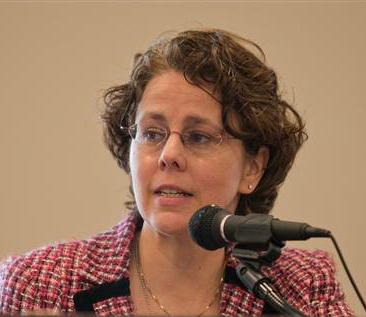

Director of the Domestic Policy Council
- In office January 10, 2012 – January 20, 2017
- President: Barack Obama
- Deputy: James Kvaal
- Preceded by: Melody Barnes
- Succeeded by: Andrew Bremberg

Director of the White House Office of Intergovernmental Affairs
- In office January 20, 2009 – January 10, 2012
- President: Barack Obama
- Preceded by: Janet Creighton
- Succeeded by: David Agnew

Personal details
- Born: July 27, 1962 (age 63) Detroit, Michigan, U.S.
- Party: Democratic
- Spouse: Amit Pandya
- Education: University of Michigan (BA); University of California, Berkeley (MA)

Cecilia Muñoz (born July 27, 1962) is an American public policy expert who served as Director of the White House Domestic Policy Council under President Obama, a position she held for five years. Prior to that, she served as the White House Director of Intergovernmental Affairs for three years.

Before working for the White House, she was Senior Vice President for the Office of Research, Advocacy and Legislation at the National Council of La Raza (NCLR), the largest Latino advocacy organization in the United States. At NCLR, she supervised all legislative and advocacy activities conducted by NCLR policy staff. She was also the Chair of the Board of the Center for Community Change and served on the U.S. Programs Board of the Open Society Institute and on the boards of directors of the Atlantic Philanthropies and the National Immigration Forum. In 2000, she was named a MacArthur Fellow for her work on civil rights and immigration.

Since leaving government service, she has served at New America, a Washington-D.C. based think tank. She also co-founded and co-chairs several small non-profits including Welcome.US, Frontline Justice, Bedrock and More Perfect.

She was featured in several episodes of the documentary series How Democracy Works Now: Twelve Stories, and she contributed a chapter to West Wingers: Stories from the Dream Chasers, Change Makers, and Hope Creators Inside the Obama White House discussing her experiences in the Obama White House. In 2020 she published More Than Ready: Be Strong and Be You... and Other Lessons for Women of Color on the Rise with Seal Press.

== Early life and education ==
Muñoz was born in Detroit, Michigan the youngest of four children. Her parents had moved to the United States from La Paz, Bolivia, so that her father, an automotive engineer, could attend the University of Michigan. When she was three, the family moved to Livonia, Michigan, a Detroit suburb. Muñoz attended the University of Michigan in Ann Arbor. As a volunteer, she tutored Hispanic American inmates at the state prison in nearby Jackson, Michigan. She earned undergraduate degrees in English and Latin American studies in 1984. Following graduation, Muñoz continued her education at the University of California at Berkeley, where she earned a master's degree, also in Latin American studies.

== Career ==
As Director of Intergovernmental Affairs, Muñoz was the Obama Administration's main liaison with state, local and tribal governments, including the Big Seven organizations that represent most state and local officials, including the Council of State Governments, the National Governors Association and the National Conference of State Legislatures. She co-chaired the White House Task Force on Puerto Rico's Political Status, where her work prompted several politicians from both sides to celebrate her designation as head of the Domestic Policy Council.

She was featured in the documentary film Last Best Chance, story twelve of the series How Democracy Works Now, from filmmakers Shari Robertson and Michael Camerini. A cut of the film premiered on HBO in March 2010, under the title The Senator's Bargain.

Muñoz appeared in Mountains and Clouds, story two in the series How Democracy Works Now, where she and Frank Sharry discuss being at a potential "watershed moment" for comprehensive immigration reform, in 2001. Additionally, she was featured in Ain't the AFL for Nothin', story seven in the series where she is shown working on a proposal for immigration, in 2003.

In 2020, Muñoz authored More than Ready, an autobiography about her life and tenure in the White House.

In November 2020, Muñoz was announced as a member of Joe Biden's transition staff.

== Personal life ==
Muñoz married attorney Amit Anant Pandya in September 1991. He is a human rights lawyer. They have two daughters.

== See also ==
- How Democracy Works Now: Twelve Stories
- Immigration

Political offices
Preceded by Janet Creighton	Director of the White House Office of Intergovernmental Affairs; 2009–2012; Served alongside: Valerie Jarrett (Public Engagement and Intergovernmental Affairs)	Succeeded by David Agnew
Preceded by Melody Barnes	Director of the Domestic Policy Council; 2012–2017	Succeeded by Andrew Bremberg
