= Frank Sharry =

American lobbyist

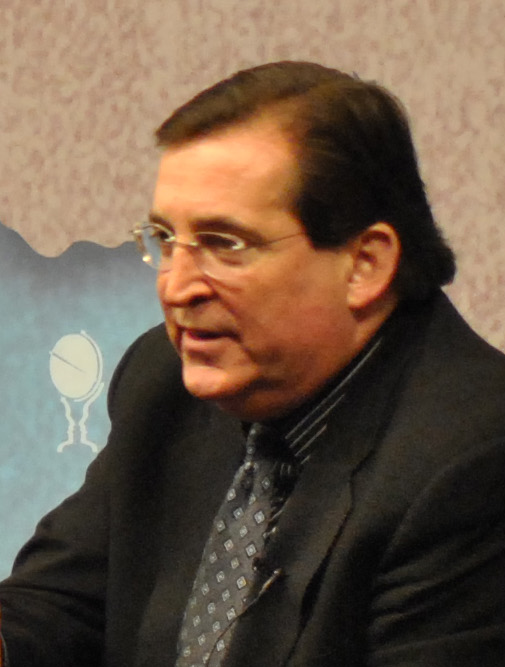
- Sharry in 2011
- Born: Connecticut, United States
- Education: Princeton University
- Organization: America's Voice

Frank Sharry is the founder and executive director of America's Voice, a liberal immigration reform group.

== Early life ==
He was raised in West Hartford, Connecticut, by an Italian-American mother and an Irish-American father. Sharry was graduated from Princeton University in 1978, majoring in history and American studies. He was captain of the soccer team during his junior and senior year, served as a resident advisor his senior year and was active in student protest efforts regarding the role of private and selective eating clubs in college life and university investments in firms operating in a South Africa ruled by apartheid.

After graduation he taught secondary school for a year at the United World College of Southeast Asia in Singapore. Sharry left to work for the American Council for Nationalities Service (ACNS) in Singapore and Indonesia to assist with the resettlement of boat refugees fleeing war-torn Vietnam in search of temporary safe haven in Indonesia.

He returned to the United States in 1980 and worked for ACNS in Fort Chaffee, Arkansas, helping to resettle Cuban refugees who arrived from the Cuban Port of Mariel. Sharry next moved to the ACNS main office in New York to direct a special nationwide resettlement program for Cuban Refugees. He then was promoted to oversee the nationwide resettlement program in 27 cities for refugees from Southeast Asia, Africa, and elsewhere.

== Political advocacy ==
In 1986, Sharry left ACNS and moved to Cambridge, Massachusetts where he became the executive director of Centro Presente, a local organization that worked with Central Americans who had fled civil war and human rights violations in their countries of origin in order to seek safe haven in the greater Boston area. While there he helped to found the Massachusetts Immigrant and Refugee Advocacy (MIRA) Coalition, a statewide immigrant advocacy organization.

== National Immigration Forum ==
In 1990, he was hired to become the executive director of the National Immigration Forum (NIF), an immigration policy organization that is based in Washington, D.C. and has been directly involved in every major legislative policy debate related to immigration since its founding in 1982.

== America's Voice ==
In 2008, Sharry left the National Immigration Forum to become the founder and executive director of America's Voice, an organization that serves as the communications arm of the immigration reform movement. Since its inception America's Voice has advocated for liberal immigration reform, including amnesty.

Sharry has also been featured in the documentary film series, How Democracy Works Now, by filmmakers Shari Robertson and Michael Camerini. The series features 12 films about the immigration debate in America from 2000 through 2007. The last film in the series was aired on HBO in March 2010 under the title Senators' Bargain. It shows Sharry working with both Senator Edward Kennedy and the Bush White House for an immigration compromise that would have legalized most of the nation's 12 million undocumented immigrants, a compromise that was defeated on the floor of the U.S. Senate.

== 2024 election consultations ==
In August 2024, Politico reported that Sharry was among advisors for the Kamala Harris 2024 presidential campaign.

== Film ==
Sharry is featured in the documentary film entitled Last Best Chance , Story Twelve of the series How Democracy Work Now, from filmmakers Shari Robertson and Michael Camerini. A cut of the film premiered on HBO in March 2010, under the title The Senator's Bargain .

He also appeared in The Game Is On, Story One in the series How Democracy Works Now. Sharry is shown in Iowa giving a training seminar for media.
