= Immigration reform in the United States =

Reforming the immigration policy of the United States is a subject of political discourse and contention. Immigration has played an essential part in American history, as everyone except for the Native Americans and descendants of enslaved Africans in the United States is descended from people who migrated. (Note: The Atlantic slave trade entailed the forced displacement of enslaved Africans to the Americas.)

Illegal immigration is extremely controversial in the United States, receiving much attention in recent decades yet yielding little legislative consensus or action. Since the failure of the Border Security, Economic Opportunity, and Immigration Modernization Act of 2013, no significant immigration reform legislation has been enacted. As of 2022, the DACA program is prohibited from adding new beneficiaries but has not been ended or struck down due to the Supreme Court's 2020 decision in Department of Homeland Security v. Regents of the University of California.

== Background ==
In the United States of America, immigration reform is a term widely used to describe proposals to maintain or increase legal immigration, while decreasing illegal immigration. Notable examples of reform being enacted is the guest worker proposal supported by President George W. Bush, and the Border Security, Economic Opportunity, and Immigration Modernization or "Gang of Eight" bill which passed the U.S. Senate in June 2013.

Proponents of greater immigration enforcement argue that illegal immigrants tarnish the public image of immigrants, cost taxpayers an estimated $338.3 billion (however, opponents claim that this figure is erroneous and misleading assertions and state that published studies vary widely but put the cost to government at a small fraction of that total), and jeopardize the safety of law enforcement officials and citizens, especially along the Mexican border.

Since early 2013, the term immigration reform has been applied to efforts to "overhaul" the broken immigration system in the United States. In his November 20, 2014 speech on immigration, U.S. President Obama summarized the need for revision to immigration laws and procedures as follows:

Today, our immigration system is broken, and everybody knows it. Families who enter our country the right way and play by the rules watch others flout the rules. Business owners who offer their workers good wages benefits see the competition exploit undocumented immigrants by paying them far less. All of us take offense to anyone who reaps the rewards of living in America without taking on the responsibilities of living in America. And undocumented immigrants who desperately want to embrace those responsibilities see little option but to remain in the shadows, or risk their families being torn apart.

Critics of Obama's immigration positions and actions have nevertheless also called for policy changes. "Standards for immigration reform" announced in January 2014 by Congressional Republicans are mostly compatible with the Obama administration's legislative proposals, except that the Republicans favor step-wise implementation (rather than a package approach) with border security and interior enforcement preceding "paths" to legal status. Journalist and immigration critic Roy Beck supports portions of this agenda involving "immigration reduction": specifically endorsing bills to limit family-sponsored immigration to spouses and children, to end "birthright citizenship", and to tighten "interior enforcement" and employer verification requirements.

In November 2015, U.S. House of Representatives speaker Paul D. Ryan indicated that the House majority would not try to work further with the Obama administration on immigration reform.

As of 2022, the DACA program is prohibited from adding new beneficiaries but has not been ended or struck down due to the Supreme Court's 2020 decision in Department of Homeland Security v. Regents of the University of California.

== Immigration reform in the United States (1986 to 2009) ==
The most recent major immigration reform enacted in the United States, the Immigration Reform and Control Act of 1986, made it illegal to hire or recruit illegal immigrants, while also legalizing some 2.7 million undocumented residents who entered the United States before 1982. The law did not provide a legal way for the great number of low-skilled workers wishing to enter the United States. Following this 1986 law, almost 12 million undocumented workers came illegally across the U.S. border. It was estimated that this illegal workforce made up about five percent of the U.S. workforce. It was also estimated that about 70 percent of those illegal workers were from Mexico.

Former Mexican president Vicente Fox wrote that, in 2001, President George W. Bush and the leadership of both parties of Congress were ready to pass significant immigration reform legislation benefiting Mexican emigration to the U.S. The immigration reform that Bush and Fox hoped for was put on hold after the terrorist attacks of September 11, 2001.

In 2005, the U.S. House of Representatives passed the Border Protection, Anti-terrorism, and Illegal Immigration Control Act of 2005, and in 2006 the U.S. Senate passed the Comprehensive Immigration Reform Act of 2006. Neither bill became law because their differences could not be reconciled in conference committee. The legislative negotiations and national activism behind immigration reform from 2001 to 2007 is the subject of the 12-part documentary film series How Democracy Works Now.

In 2009, immigration reform became a hot topic again since the Barack Obama administration signaled interest in beginning a discussion on comprehensive immigration reform before that year's end. The proposed comprehensive immigration reform plan had bipartisan support as one of its goals, and included six sections designed to have "something for everyone". These six sections were:

1. to fix border enforcement,
2. "interior enforcement", such as preventing visa overstays,
3. preventing people from working without a work permit,
4. creating a committee to adapt the number of visas available to changing economic times,
5. a program to provide a path to legal status for illegal immigrants, and
6. programs to help immigrants adjust to life in the United States.

Individual states can only regulate or produce immigration policies to the extent it doesn't conflict with federal law, due to the naturalization clause being one of the enumerated powers of Congress.

=== Effect of media coverage on public opinion ===
A 2010 study examining the years 1992 to 2009 found that when immigration issues receive national media attention (as estimated by the number of mentions of immigration by CBS, ABC, and USA Today), established residents living in places that have seen influx of new immigrants suddenly become much more politicized against immigration. The study reported that during a period of high national attention to immigration, anti-immigration attitudes among established residents in fast-changing counties increase by 9.9%. The study's author said that ethnic and racial surroundings appear to affect Americans' political attitudes far less than previously thought: "Those who live near larger proportions of immigrants do not consistently exhibit more negative attitudes." Rather, the author concludes, "day-to-day encounters can be shaped by salient national issues." The study's conclusions are still only tentative.

== Effects on the US economy ==
Other studies suggest that immigration reform which includes legalization of unauthorized immigrants might add considerably to U.S. Gross Domestic Product (GDP) over 10 years, and increase wages for workers generally.

Raúl Hinojosa-Ojeda, founding director of the North American Integration and Development Center at the University of California, Los Angeles, has estimated that in just the first three years following legalization for undocumented immigrants, the "higher earning power of newly legalized workers translates into an increase in net personal income of $30 to $36 billion, which could generate $4.5 to $5.4 billion in additional net tax revenue. Moreover, it is estimated that an increase in personal income of this scale would stimulate consumer spending sufficient to support 750,000 to 900,000 jobs."

A 2013 study by the Workers Defense Project and the University of Texas sampling construction sites in five Texas cities, found half of construction workers there were undocumented.

=== High cost of immigration enforcement ===
Immigration enforcement has increased rapidly since the 1990s. The U.S. Border Patrols's annual budget has increased by 714 percent. The cost went from $362.2 million in the fiscal year of 1992 to $2.7 billion in the fiscal year of 2009. Also the U.S. Immigration and Customs enforcement has grown 73 percent, from $3.3 billion since its inception to $5.9 billion in 2014.

=== Revision of H-1B visa ===
President Donald Trump signed the "Buy American, Hire American" executive order in April 2017 that would direct U.S. agencies to propose rules to prevent immigration fraud and abuse in the program. They would also be asked to offer changes so that H-1B visas are awarded to the "most-skilled" or highest-paid applicants.

== Effects on people ==
=== Broken families ===
The U.S. immigration system determines who enters the country, and how many, either by order or under certain circumstances. It also decides who can apply for permanent visas for family and relatives. Advocates of increased admission of family members characterize the system as "broken," for preventing family reunification. They argue that family reunification will reduce waiting lines and conflicts over the number of visas of children and spouses. Approximately 5,100 children with a detained or deported parent were in the public child welfare system in 2011. Advocates for reducing immigration have, however, argued that making family reunification migration easier would tend to erode important distinctions between citizens and non-citizens, and lead to higher overall immigration levels.

=== Loss of cultural identity ===
The past 20 years have seen growing anti-immigrant policies that have created a hostile environment for migrants. To gain legitimacy in the United States under such conditions, non-citizens portray themselves as what they believe best embodies the American identity. This legitimacy process disregards the cultural identities of non-citizens. It forces them to conform to a "national political imagination." A "national political imagination" prioritizes the American identity as the standard. Therefore, the cultural identities of migrants are deemed different and are disregarded. This perpetuates the exclusion of distinct cultural identities and promotes a single national identity. The emphasis on this legitimacy process limits proper understanding of the needs and interests of non-citizens. This can impede progress towards immigration reform.

=== Civic organizations ===
Following the 2016 elections, non-citizens started to rely more on civic organizations than on government offices. Civic organizations demonstrated to be better positioned to support immigration reform without disregarding diverse cultural identities. Such organizations build trust and conduct outreach to immigrant communities. They do so by effectively translating information, which ensures that these communities are properly informed and empowered to self-mobilize.

== Arizona SB 1070 ==
In 2009, services provided to illegal immigrants, including incarceration, cost the state of Arizona an estimated $12.7 billion.

Citing Congress' failure to enforce U.S. immigration laws, the state of Arizona confronted reform and on April 23, 2010, Republican Governor Jan Brewer signed the Support Our Law Enforcement and Safe Neighborhoods Act (Arizona SB 1070)-- the broadest and strictest immigration reform imposed in the United States.

The SB1070 Arizona immigration law directs law enforcement officials to ask for immigration papers on a "reasonable suspicion" that a person might be an illegal immigrant and make arrests for not carrying ID papers in keeping with federal requirements. Previously, police could not stop and check identification papers on a mere suspicion that someone might be an illegal immigrant. Police could only ask about an individual's immigration status if they are suspected of involvement in another crime.

On July 6, 2010, the US Department of Justice filed suit against Arizona. In 2012, the Supreme Court ruled in Arizona v. United States that sections 3, 5(C), and 6 of S. B. 1070 were preempted by federal law but left other parts of the law intact, including a provision that allowed law enforcement to investigate a person's immigration status.

== Immigration Court reform ==
In the absence of comprehensive immigration reform at the federal level, many advocacy groups have focused on improving the fairness and efficiency of the immigration court system. They propose incremental steps the executive branch can take to stop an "assembly line approach" to deportation proceedings. These groups have identified several issues that threaten the due process rights of immigrants, including reliance on low quality videoconferencing to conduct hearings, inadequate language interpretation services for non-English speakers, and limited access to court records. They also focus on problems arising out of the recent increase in immigration law enforcement without a commensurate boost in resources for adjudication. Immigration Judges and DHS Trial Attorneys are overworked, and the pro bono community has been unable to meet the demand for representation: 49% of individuals facing removal proceedings in 2011 were unrepresented. Other calls for reform include increased transparency at the Board of Immigration Appeals (BIA) and more diversity of experience among Immigration Judges, the majority of whom previously held positions adversarial to immigrants.

The Deferred Action for Childhood Arrivals program President Obama announced on June 15, 2012, is an example of the incremental reform sought by such groups. Under the program, illegal immigrants who were brought to the U.S. before age fifteen can apply for a work permit and a two-year deferment from deportation proceedings. The policy expands the Department of Homeland Security's prosecutorial discretion policy, focusing finite resources on criminals and other threats to public safety.

Several pieces of amnesty legislation aimed at preserving DACA were introduced in Congress in 2018. A package proposed by Rep. Bob Goodlatte (R-VA) that would have granted DACA beneficiaries a path to citizenship in return for a border wall and major cutbacks in family-based chain migration failed in the House with 193 votes, with 41 Republicans and all 190 Democrats voting no. A week later, an even greater amnesty package sponsored by Paul Ryan and the party leadership died in the House with only 121 votes. That law would have granted amnesty to almost two million illegal immigrants while maintaining the most important chain migration categories. DACA's future is currently unknown.

== U.S. Immigration and Customs Enforcement removal proceedings ==
Since President Obama took office in 2008, more than two million unauthorized immigrants have been deported. Most of these people were not a danger to society. In the fiscal year 2013 ICE removed 151,834 individuals who didn't have a criminal conviction. In 2013, ICE released thirty-six thousand individuals with criminal records, including 193 found convicted of murder and 426 convicted of sexual assault. Additionally, ICE encountered about sixty-eight thousand aliens with criminal records who they did not prosecute. If immigration reform becomes law, many of those who entered the country illegally would likely be able to remain in the United States. The U.S. Immigration and Customs Enforcement, also known as ICE, has enforcement priorities that involve: apprehension of terrorists, violent criminals, gang members, which are categorized under three priorities. The first and highest priority is to remove aliens who pose a danger to national security or a risk to public safety. Second priority is recent illegal entrants; those who have recently violated immigration control at the border such as overstay visas. The third priority is aliens who are fugitives or otherwise obstruct immigration control, for instance, reentries after prior order of deportation. ICE resources are limited; an estimated 400,000 aliens can be removed per year, but that is less than 4 percent of the illegal population in the United States.

In 2014, the number of individuals apprehended at the border was up 16 percent from the previous fiscal year, and the number of deportations from within the United States dropped 24 percent from the previous fiscal year. That year, Operation Streamline was ended. The number of individuals deported by the Obama Administration up through 2014, was lower than that of any previous administration.

== Failure of S.744 in 2013 ==
On January 28, 2013, a bipartisan group of eight Senators, known as the "Gang of Eight" announced principles for comprehensive immigration reform (CIR). The Senators involved include: Charles Schumer of New York, Dick Durbin of Illinois, Bob Menendez of New Jersey, and Michael Bennet of Colorado, and Republicans John McCain of Arizona, Lindsey Graham of South Carolina, Marco Rubio of Florida, and Jeff Flake of Arizona.

The policies envisioned by the Senators include the following provisions:

- A citizenship path for illegal immigrants already in the United States contingent on certain border security and visa tracking improvements. The plan provides for permanent residence for illegal immigrants only after legal immigrants waiting for a current priority date receive their permanent residence status and a different citizenship path for agricultural workers through an agricultural worker program.
- Business immigration system reforms, focusing on reducing current visa backlogs and fast tracking permanent residence for U.S. university immigrant graduates with advanced degrees in science, technology, engineering or math also known as the STEM fields.
- An expanded and improved employment verification system for all employers to confirm employee work authorization.
- Improved work visa options for low-skill workers including an agricultural worker program.

In April 2013, according to Congressional Quarterly, the existence of a bipartisan group of lawmakers working to reform immigration was revealed during a question and answer session at a Ripon Society event with House Speaker John Boehner (R-OH).

On April 16, 2013, the "Gang of Eight" in the United States Senate introduced S.744, the long-awaited Senate version of the immigration reform bill proposed in congress. The bill was a product of bipartisan cooperation among Senate lawmakers, business groups, labor unions, agricultural interests, and immigration advocates, who negotiated many compromises resulting in an architecture for reform – including a path to citizenship for eleven million illegal immigrants, a temporary worker program, increased visa numbers for skilled foreign workers, and a nationwide employment eligibility verification system.

On June 27, 2013, the United States Senate approved S.744, known as the Border Security, Economic Opportunity, and Immigration Modernization Act of 2013 in a historic 68-to-32 vote. The immigration reform bill was sent to the United States House of Representatives, but was never brought to the House floor for debate or an up-or-down vote and thus died at the end of the 113th Congress.

== President Obama's actions after legislative failure (2014 to 2017) ==
=== Influx of children migrants from Central America ===
The border crisis in 2014 where thousands of children alone or with their mothers crossed the border and turned themselves in to the Border Patrol has been seen, in part, as a result of ambiguous US immigration policies. Numbers arriving in the first part of 2014 were at a pace more than double that of a year earlier. Cecilia Muñoz, director of the White House Domestic Policy Council, acknowledged in June 2014 "rumors and reports, or suggestions, that the increase may be in response to the perception that children would be allowed to stay or that immigration reform would in some way benefit these children," but added that "it seems to be quite clear that what is driving this is what's happening in their home countries." Mexico and Central American countries have since taken measures to try to reduce the flow, the U.S. border patrol has sought to speed apprehensions, and the Obama administration has requested additional funding for screening and deportation, and tougher penalties on smugglers. Arrivals of children at the U.S. borders slowed from in August 2014, compared to May and June.

=== Deferred Action Executive Orders: DACA and DAPA ===
On November 20, 2014, in a televised address from the White House, President Barack Obama announced a program of "deferred action" which would allow roughly 45% of illegal immigrants to legally stay and work in the United States. The largest prior deferral action, in 1990, during the administration of President George H.W. Bush, affected 40% of undocumented immigrants then. Up to 3.7 million undocumented parents of individuals who are U.S. citizens, or who have been legal permanent residents in the country for at least five years, are eligible for the new deferrals, as are about 300,000 immigrants who arrived as children before January 2010. Members of this second group would be eligible by expansion of the existing Deferred Action for Childhood Arrivals (DACA) program, which previously covered 1.2 million people, the expansion bringing the new coverage total to 1.5 million. The new deferrals would be granted for three years at a time. Supplemental executive actions also announced include an end to the Secure Communities program, increased resources for border enforcement, and new procedures for "high-skilled immigrants". These other "parts of the president's plan" could provide "protection from deportation" for roughly "an additional one million people". President Obama's actions were clearly presented as a response to Congress having been unable in recent years to agree on a general legislative overhaul of U.S. immigration policy. Obama indicated:

[By] acting where Congress has failed ... [I hope] to work with both parties to pass a more permanent legislative solution. And the day I sign that bill into law, the actions I take will no longer be necessary.

On December 16, 2014, Arthur J. Schwab, a United States federal judge in the United States District Court for the Western District of Pennsylvania, ruled that President Obama's executive action on immigration was unconstitutional in a case involving a Honduran man facing criminal charges for returning to the United States after being deported. As the New York Times put it, this finding "had no immediate effect". On December 4, 2014, a more direct challenge was, however, filed in federal court by the attorney general of Texas, on behalf of 17 states.

By January 26, 2015, the number of states participating in the lawsuit had grown to 26. On February 12, testifying before the House of Representatives, officials from Ohio and Kansas stated that, due to the actions of the Obama Administration, it was difficult to determine whether illegal immigrants had registered to vote. The Senators claimed that, despite the rigorous repercussions for falsifying registration information, a considerable number of still illegal immigrants might take advantage of the ongoing and adapting bureaucratic efforts on the part of those filtering the applications. The illegal immigrants seeking to gain the right to vote in America were alleged to be facilitated not only by the new and large influx of legitimate applications, but also by the ready availability of the necessary registration forms, which could be obtained by anyone with access to a local DMV, a shopping mall, or one of a growing number of "curbside registration drives".

On February 16, 2015, Judge Andrew S. Hanen, of Federal District Court in Brownsville, Texas, issued a temporary injunction against the Deferred Action for Parental Accountability (DAPA) program. On February 17, 2015, just one day before undocumented immigrants were set to begin applying for work permits and legal protections, Homeland Security Secretary Jeh Johnson announced a delay in implementing the DAPA program, but also said that the district court ruling would be appealed. USA Today noted the expectation of Cornell University law professor Stephen Yale-Loehr that the appeal will likely eventually succeed since federal courts generally give "the president broad authority to shape the enforcement and implementation of immigration laws".

The appeal was heard on an expedited basis by three judges of the United States Court of Appeals for the Fifth Circuit on July 10, 2015. On November 9, the divided circuit court affirmed the preliminary injunction of February 2015, and ordered the case back to the district court in Texas for trial. Judge Jerry Edwin Smith, joined by Judge Jennifer Walker Elrod agreed with the district court that Texas has standing because of the cost of issuing drivers licenses to aliens, and that President Obama's order violated the rulemaking requirement of the Administrative Procedure Act. The majority made a new finding that the Immigration and Nationality Act "flatly does not permit" deferred action. Judge Carolyn Dineen King dissented, arguing that prosecutorial discretion makes the case non-justiciable, and that there had been "no justification" for the circuit court's delay in ruling.

In United States v. Texas, the Supreme Court deadlocked 4–4 on June 23, leaving in place the appeals court ruling blocking Obama's executive actions. On June 15, 2017, Trump's Homeland Security Secretary John F. Kelly announced that the order establishing the DAPA program was rescinded.

== First Trump administration's immigration policy (2017 to 2021) ==
On April 16, 2015, Donald Trump suggested that a wall be built on the Mexico–United States border to prevent people from entering the country illegally. According to a report released by the Trump administration in 2017, the construction of the proposed border wall would take around three and a half years and cost between $21.6 billion and $25 billion. On February 15, 2019, President Trump declared a national emergency in order to move military funding towards building the wall. This was met with significant criticism and backlash from the media and members of both major political parties. Throughout 2019 and 2020, President Trump maintained his stance on immigration, promising that his plan would prioritize the "jobs, wages, and safety of American workers" and "promote American values."

== Biden administration's immigration policy (2021 to 2025) ==
President Joe Biden proposed the U.S. Citizenship Act of 2021 on his first day in office. The American Dream and Promise Act and Farm Workforce Modernization Act passed the House of Representatives in 2021, as they had in 2019, with support from Biden. Attempts to pass any of these bills in the Senate was blocked by Republican opposition, and parliamentary rulings that immigration policy changes could not be passed under reconciliation rules to bypass the Senate filibuster.

As of 2023, Joe Biden has not attempted to revive or recreate DAPA by executive order.

The Biden administration has taken significant steps to protect DACA from ongoing litigation. After a federal ruling declared the program illegal in 2021, the Biden Administration promptly moved to keep the program intact. In 2022, the Department of Homeland Security made a new rule to allow the codification of DACA under federal law, with the explicit purpose of strengthening its legality and securing stability for beneficiaries. This regulatory move was a departure from the prior efforts of the Trump Administration to eliminate the program entirely, but it has neither eliminated the current legal controversies nor secured a certain future for DACA.

Early in his presidency, he proposed the U.S. Citizenship Act of 2021, which included a pathway to citizenship for Dreamers. The legislation stalled in Congress, illustrating the deep partisan splits over immigration policy. Despite such a barrier, the Biden Administration, however, reiterated their commitment toward legislative solutions, called upon Congress to pass the DREAM Act and other legislation to provide long-term protections. The administration has been criticized for not pursuing more aggressive steps to secure permanent protections through executive orders or expanding protections to other undocumented groups. The uncertainty with DACA makes the need to reform the overall immigration system even more pressing, to come up with durable solutions for millions of undocumented immigrants in the United States.

== Second Trump administration's immigration policy (2025 to present) ==
During his second term, President Trump has increased immigration enforcement. Significant measures include deportation via removal flights that send immigrants to countries where they may not have even originated from. President Trump has also promoted Immigration and Customs Enforcement across the country. The hostile environment resulting from these most recent policies significantly impact any progress towards reform.

== See also ==
- Immigration to the United States
  - History of immigration to the United States
  - History of laws concerning immigration and naturalization in the United States
  - Mexico–United States barrier
  - Illegal immigration to the United States
- Immigration reduction
- Open immigration
- Human migration
- Republicans for Immigration Reform
- Federation for American Immigration Reform (FAIR)
- Immigration Reform and Control Act of 1986
- Comprehensive Immigration Reform Act of 2007
- Border Security, Economic Opportunity, and Immigration Modernization Act of 2013
- H1B visa
- Deferred Action for Childhood Arrivals
- DREAM Act
- American Families United Act
- E-Verify
- Immigration policy of Donald Trump
- Immigration policy of the Joe Biden administration
