= Esther Olavarria =

American government official (born 1962)

Deputy Director of the Domestic Policy Council for Immigration
- Incumbent
- Assumed office January 20, 2021
- President: Joe Biden
- Leader: Susan Rice
- Preceded by: Position established

Personal details
- Born: 1962 (age 62–63) Cuba
- Education: University of Florida (BA), (JD)

Esther Olavarria is a Cuban American attorney. Born in Cuba, she emigrated to the United States in 1962 with her family.

== Career ==
Esther Olavarria has worked in the immigration and refugee field for decades at nonprofit organizations and in the federal government. She began her career as an immigration attorney in Miami, Florida, working at various non-profit organizations representing asylum seekers and immigrants. Between 1986 and 1998 she was a staff attorney for the Haitian Refugee Center, co-founder and managing attorney of the Florida Immigrant Advocacy Center, and on staff with Legal Services of Greater Miami as directing attorney with the American Immigration Lawyer Pro Bono Project. Moving to Washington, DC in 1998, she served for as Senator Edward Kennedy's immigration counsel on the Senate Judiciary Committee, where she worked on a broad range of initiatives, including common sense immigration reform. Joining the Obama administration in 2009, Esther served in senior positions at the Department of Homeland Security and the White House Domestic Policy Council, where she helped craft administrative and legislative initiatives. She has also worked for the Immigration Hub, the Center for American Progress and the UNHCR, the UN Refugee Agency.

In November 2020, Olavarria was named a volunteer member of the Joe Biden presidential transition Agency Review Team to support transition efforts related to the Department of Homeland Security.

She received a Bachelor of Arts from the University of Florida in 1983 and her Juris Doctor degree from the University of Florida Levin College of Law in 1986. Currently, Olavarria is an independent consultant in Washington, DC.

Olavarria was featured in the documentary series How Democracy Works Now: Twelve Stories from filmmakers Shari Robertson and Michael Camerini. A version of the film premiered on HBO in March 2010, under the title "The Senator's Bargain".

Other films she appears in through the series include:

- Story 5: "The Kids Across the Hill"
- Story 7: "Ain't the AFL for Nothin'"
- Story 8: "The Road to Miami"
- Story 11: "The Senate Speaks"

== See also ==
- United States immigration debate
- How Democracy Works Now: Twelve Stories
