= March 2006 LAUSD student walkouts =

The student walkouts of Friday, March 24, 2006, in Los Angeles, California commenced protests that spanned several days. That day, hundreds of students representing all ages walked out of at least five high schools in the Los Angeles Unified School District. Over 40,000 students staged walkouts in Los Angeles on the 27th. The protests were against the Border Protection, Anti-terrorism, and Illegal Immigration Control Act of 2005 (H.R. 4437). This act would make it even harder than ever for immigrants to attain residency status and would criminalize undocumented immigrants as well as individuals and organizations that aid them. Both Southern California immigrants and residents worked together to create a community response to legislative proposals that would scale back immigrant rights. Hundreds of thousands of people gathered at Los Angeles City Hall to demand a stop to H.R. 4437.

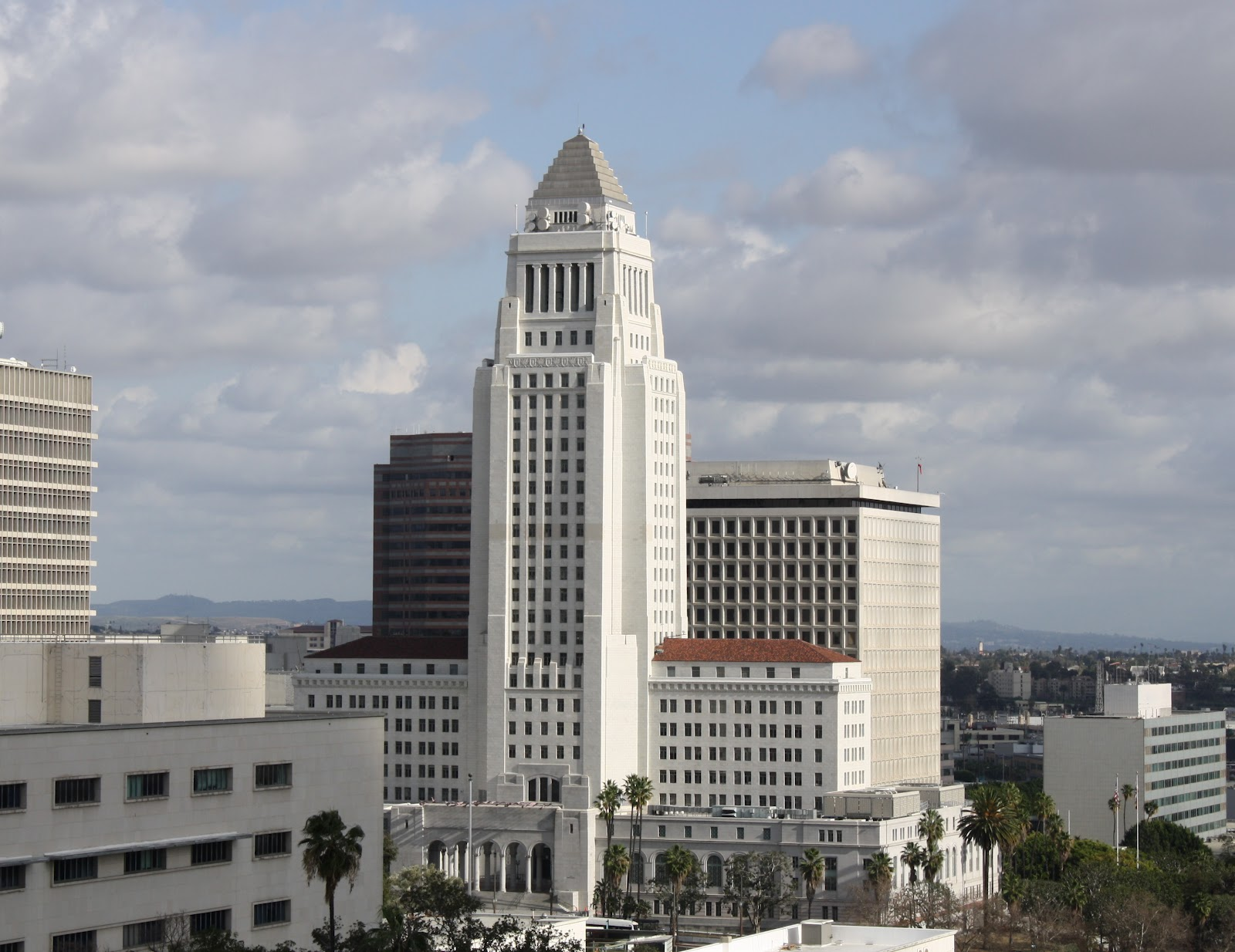
Los Angeles City Hall, one of the primary locations where the student protestors gathered

== Los Angeles student walkouts ==
The student walkouts were occurring all over the United States at this time, but the largest student walkouts took place in the districts in the western and southwestern United States. The protests are believed to have eclipsed in size the demonstrations that occurred during the anti-Proposition 187 campaign in 1994 and even a famous student walkout for Chicano rights in 1968.

The population of students protesting was not only composed of immigrants, but also individuals who supported the cause, either because of personal opinion or because their family members and friends were immigrants. The major walkouts were on the third day when 1,000 Kennedy High School students in the San Fernando Valley marched towards San Fernando High School at about 9:35 AM. The other major walkout was on that same day, when at 9:00 AM, 1,000 students at Los Angeles High School walked to Fairfax and Hollywood High School, which were both in locked down.

In Los Angeles, various schools experienced walkouts, with the major events downtown, where students converged on City Hall. The third day of the walkouts, aides of Antonio Villaraigosa escorted representatives of half a dozen high schools to meet with the Los Angeles mayor. California Lieutenant Governor Cruz Bustamante addressed the crowd, telling the demonstrators that they were sending a powerful and important message to Washington. At one point, protesters marched onto the Hollywood Freeway in downtown Los Angeles and two sections of the Harbor Freeway, downtown and in San Pedro, briefly halting traffic.

== LAUSD's response ==
The superintendents and principles scrambled to keep students in school by using strategies that ranged from campus lockdowns to disciplinary measures. LAUSD Superintendent Roy Romer instructed all high schools and middle schools to enforce a lockdown of campuses, after more than 24,000 students in 52 schools walked out on Monday, March 27, 2006.

== The media's involvement ==
The march also showed the reach and power of the Spanish-language media, which sounded a direct call to action for days leading up to Saturday. All week long, the Spanish media implored their audiences to march peacefully and respectfully. The local Spanish-language radio personalities, led by Eddie "el Piolín" Sotelo of 101.9 KSCA-FM, all began promoting the rally on their programs. They answered callers' questions about the bill and about the march's logistics. With the American national anthem playing in the background, a promo airing during Antonio Gonzalez's En el Medio program on KMXE-AM 830 told listeners: "We are all committed to the Grand March of the People!" It was still airing on Monday morning. Spanish media giant Univision, which owns the largest network audiences in Los Angeles in any language, also kept running its rally promo.

== See also ==
- United States immigration debate
- H.R. 4437
- 2006 United States immigration reform protests
