= Kentucky Coalition for Immigrant and Refugee Rights =

- Formation: 2006
- Headquarters: Lexington, KY
- Website: www.kcirr.org

The Kentucky Coalition for Immigrant and Refugee Rights (KCIRR) is a loosely organized Kentucky, United States grassroots community group based in Lexington, Kentucky but with members throughout the state.

== History ==
KCIRR began in 2006 with wide community support, as a coalition of immigrants, activists and allies working together to organize local and statewide responses to the Sensenbrenner Bill, also known as H.R. 4437, and in support of just, humane, and comprehensive immigration reform.

On April 10, 2006, KCIRR organized "10-10-10", which was a rally in support of comprehensive immigration reform. Over 10,000 supporters gathered in the Courthouse Plaza of downtown Lexington, Kentucky, for the event. It was the largest rally in recent Kentucky history. One of the speakers at the Rally was long time African American activist, Jim Embry, who spoke about the historical connection between the struggles of African Americans, immigrants and Latino Americans. His speech was circulated nationally and was subsequently published in Latino Studies (Jim Embry, "Rivers That We Cross ... Our New Wave of Immigrants from the South," Latino Studies 4 (2006): 448–449) and referenced by George Sanchez, Professor of History and American Studies and Ethnicity at the University of Southern California On February 21, 2007, working with diverse allies, the group organized a historic first Immigrant and Refugee Rights Advocacy Day in Kentucky. With over eighty people in attendance, the day was historic as the first event singularly in support of immigrant and refugee rights at the Kentucky State Capitol.</http://sustainlex.org/jim.html>, <https://southernspaces.org/2007/latinos-american-south-and-future-us-race-relations>, <http://sustainlex.org/EmbryspeechatImmigrantrightsrally.pdf>

By Fall 2008 the organization experienced massive turnover of staff and board members as burnout and personal issues took their toll. The organization continues today in a more limited form, but is in the process of reorganizing and re-energizing with assistance from young immigrants known as DREAMers.

== Current activities ==
=== Public education ===
KCIRR regularly organizes forums, film screenings, panel discussions, community education meetings in partnership with other groups and communities across the state on a variety of topics including: Comprehensive Immigration Reform, Know Your Rights, Naturalization, Citizenship, Deportation, Detention, Organizing, Legislative Updates, Local Policies, the History of Immigration, Rights Violation Reporting, Raid Preparation, LGBT Immigration Issues, Human Trafficking, Gang Prevention, and Diversity Issues.

On June 9–10, 2007 a board member of the organization, Dianet Plucinksi, ran over eighty miles in a two-day period from Louisville, Kentucky, to Frankfort, Kentucky, and then from Frankfort to Lexington, Kentucky, in recognition of the thousands who have died crossing the US-Mexico Border. Proceeds from the event supported Border Angels, an organization providing water and emergency assistance at the US-Mexico Border.

At a January 2008 event attended by over 200 members of the immigrant community, KCIRR and community partners raised awareness and educated the community on local policy changes in Lexington.

=== Leadership development ===
In November 2007 KCIRR launched a leadership development program designed to educate immigrant communities about the history of immigration, citizenship and naturalization, the electoral process, leadership, organizing, and solidarity across social justice movements. The inaugural program included participants from six countries including Venezuela, Uruguay, Honduras, Mexico, the United States, and Haiti.

=== Legislative and administrative advocacy ===
KCIRR advocates for change in local, state, and federal legislation. Since 2007 the group has supported a Kentucky Senate Bill sponsored by former Sen. Ernesto Scorsone (now a local judge) which would allow increased access to Kentucky State Driver Licenses and automobile insurance.
