= Immigrant Nation! The Battle for the Dream =

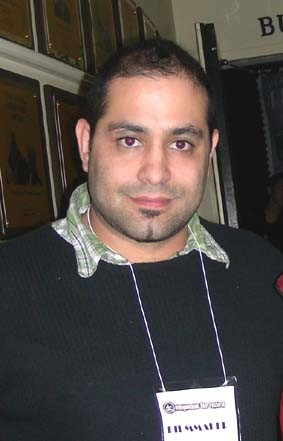
- Esaú Meléndez
- Directed by: Esaú Meléndez
- Release date: 2010
- Country: United States
- Language: English

Immigrant Nation! The Battle for the Dream is a 2010 feature documentary movie by Esaú Meléndez about the immigrant rights movement from 2006 to 2009 and Elvira Arellano's resistance to deportation. It opened on 2010-03-06 in Washington, DC, at the DC Independent Film Festival. The film includes stories of individuals, organizations, activists and community leaders. It includes coverage of anti-immigrant activists, but more coverage of those "united by passion and a concern for justice." This film features the opposition to the controversial HR4437 immigration bill, especially the march to Batavia, Illinois, to decry Speaker Dennis Hastert's blockage of comprehensive immigration reform.

== Awards ==
The documentary received a nomination for Best Documentary for Film or Television at the 2012 Imagen Awards. The film also received an Award of Merit in the feature documentary category at the July 2010 Indie Fest.
