= 2006 United States immigration reform protests =

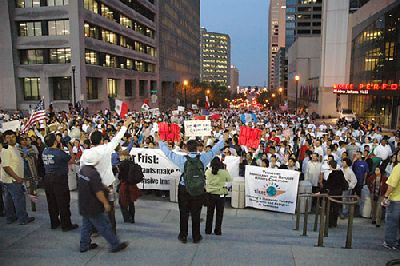
- Thousands gather in favor of immigrants' rights in Nashville, Tennessee on March 29, 2006.
- Date: March - May

The 2006 United States immigration reform protests were a series of demonstrations held across the United States between March and May 2006 in response to proposed changes to U.S. immigration policy. Millions of people participated in the protests, which scholars have identified as a significant event in the development of Latino political participation and immigrant-rights activism in the United States. The demonstrations were organized in response to proposed legislation known as H.R. 4437, which would have increased penalties related to illegal immigration and classified illegal immigrants and individuals who knowingly assisted them in entering or remaining in the United States unlawfully as felons. As part of the broader immigration debate, many participants also advocated comprehensive immigration reform, including the creation of a pathway to citizenship for undocumented immigrants.

The demonstrations began in Chicago and spread to major cities across the United States over an eight-week period. The first major protest was held in Chicago on March 10, 2006, and was estimated to have attracted about 100,000 participants. The largest single demonstration took place in downtown Los Angeles on March 25, 2006, where officials estimated that more than 500,000 people participated in the march known as "La Gran Marcha" ("The Great March"). Organizers later estimated attendance at between 1.25 and 1.5 million based on photographic analysis. The largest coordinated day of demonstrations occurred on April 10, 2006, when protests were held in 102 cities nationwide, including an estimated 350,000–500,000 participants in Dallas. Most of the demonstrations were peaceful. Additional nationwide protests took place on May Day.

== May Day ==
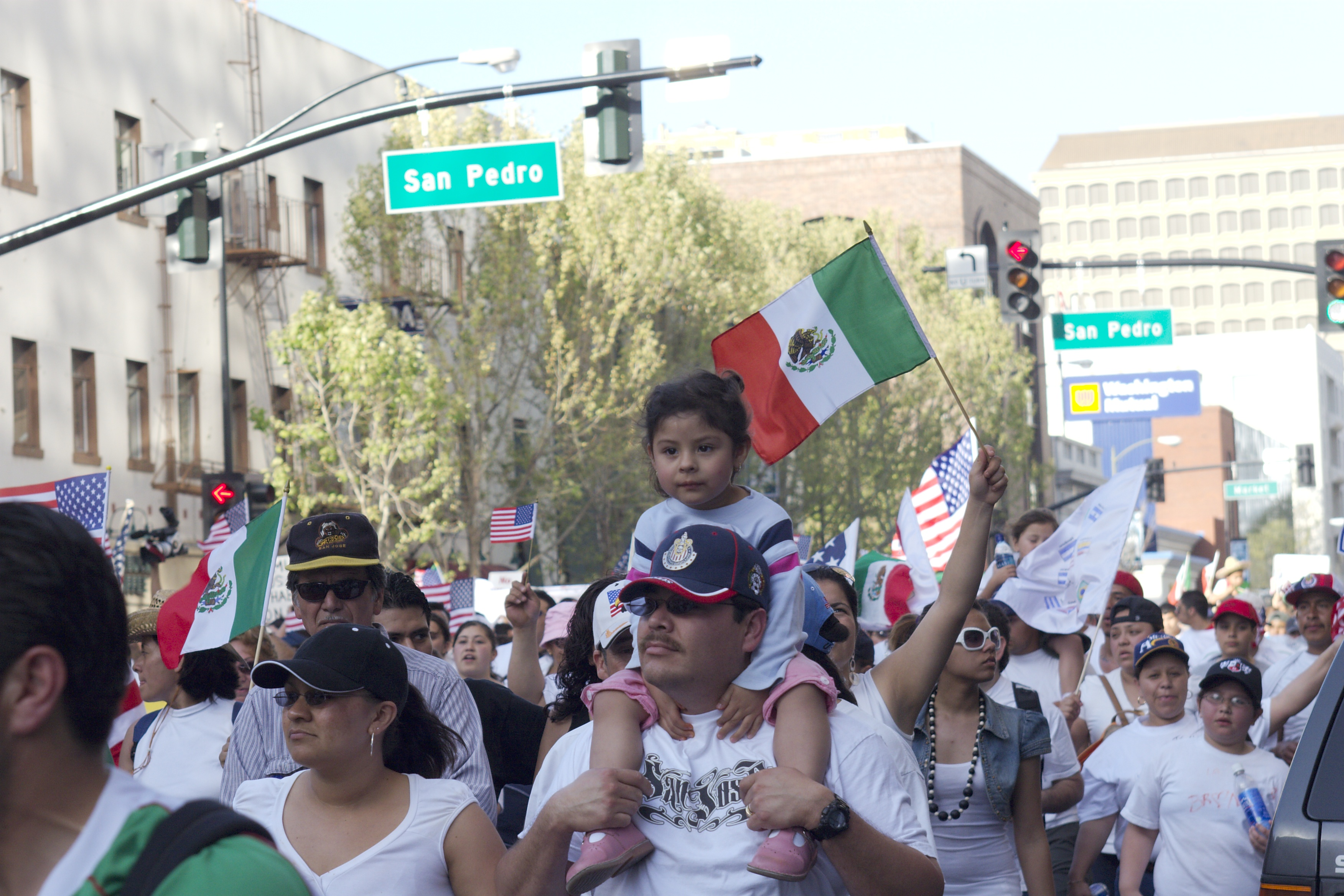
San Jose, California

The marches reached a climax on May 1, 2006, and were nicknamed "A Day Without Immigrants." Naming the protests in such way encouraged immigrants and others to quit their daily labor-intensive jobs for a day to draw attention to their significant contributions to U.S. daily life. Latino immigrants and others across the country were urged to boycott work, school and other economic activities. Those outside the Latino community were shocked to see the growing workforce of janitors, nannies, restaurant workers and many other service workers leave their jobs to join the protests. The mobilization of working-class illegal individuals was intended to challenge the belief that the United States would be able to prosper without illegal immigrants.

The protests took place on May 1, a date meant to honor workers throughout the country. The May 1st marches reflected the immigrant protesters' identities as workers and significant contributors to U.S. society. Most immigrants of Latin American descent come to the United States seeking economic prosperity for themselves and their families, they frequently accept low wage jobs to survive in the United States. Therefore, missing work for a day burdened their families. Yet, thousands of immigrants risked their jobs and joined the marches to demand political recognition.

== Illegal immigration ==
The history of unauthorized immigration provides context for the 2006 immigration reform protests and the broader debate over U.S. immigration policy. Prior to 1960, Mexican nationals could enter the United States through programs such as the Bracero Program or by crossing the border without inspection. Permanent immigration from Mexico became subject to numerical visa limits after changes to U.S. immigration law during the 1960s.

An unauthorized immigrant is generally defined as a person who resides in the United States without legal authorization. This may include individuals who entered the country without inspection as well as those who entered lawfully on temporary visas but remained after their authorized period of stay had expired. Unauthorized entry into the United States is generally classified as a misdemeanor under federal law.

Before 1965, the United States did not impose numerical immigration limits on countries in the Western Hemisphere. The Immigration and Nationality Act of 1965 repealed the national-origins quota system established by the Immigration Act of 1924, expanding immigration opportunities for many countries while also introducing numerical limits for immigration from the Western Hemisphere. The Act also retained broad provisions for family reunification, allowing U.S. citizens and lawful permanent residents to sponsor certain relatives for immigration. Scholars have identified these policy changes as contributing to changes in migration patterns from Latin America, particularly Mexico, and to the growth of the Latino population in the United States.

In response to increasing concern about unauthorized immigration during the 1980s, Congress passed the Immigration Reform and Control Act of 1986 (IRCA). The Act prohibited employers from knowingly hiring unauthorized workers and established legalization programs for certain undocumented immigrants who met residency or agricultural employment requirements. Approximately 2.7 million people obtained legal status under IRCA.

Although IRCA legalized millions of undocumented immigrants, unauthorized immigration continued in subsequent decades. In response, the federal government increased funding for border enforcement and the United States Border Patrol. Despite these measures, the unauthorized immigrant population continued to grow, reaching an estimated eleven million people by the mid-2000s, a large proportion of whom were of Mexican origin. According to scholars, these demographic changes contributed to increased political attention to unauthorized immigration and to debates over immigration policy, particularly regarding migration from Latin America.

== Role of Spanish-language media and religious leaders ==
Spanish-language media outlets, including Univision, Telemundo, Azteca América, and La Opinión, devoted extensive coverage to the protests and publicized upcoming demonstrations. Many outlets promoted the events using the term "Mega Marcha" to emphasize their scale. In Los Angeles, KMEX-TV, a Univision-owned station, used the slogan "Pisando Firme" ("Stepping Strong") in its coverage of the demonstrations and encouraged participants to march peacefully and with dignity.

Spanish-language radio also played a prominent role in publicizing the protests. Eddie "Piolín" Sotelo, host of the nationally syndicated program Piolín por la Mañana, encouraged listeners to attend demonstrations and coordinated with other Spanish-language radio hosts in Southern California. The program was broadcast in dozens of U.S. media markets, including several cities that hosted large demonstrations. Sotelo also appeared at several rallies during the protest movement.

Religious organizations and leaders also expressed support for immigration reform. Cardinal Roger Mahony of the Archdiocese of Los Angeles encouraged Catholics to support the demonstrations and called for immigration legislation that differed from H.R. 4437. He also stated that Catholic clergy should not comply with any law requiring them to inquire about an individual's immigration status before providing religious services.

Scholars have attributed the scale of the demonstrations to cooperation between Spanish-language media, immigrant advocacy organizations, labor groups, religious institutions, and community leaders, which collectively coordinated outreach and encouraged participation in protests across the United States.

== Controversy and backlash over flag symbolism and protests ==
The initial protests caused much controversy after some protesters waved Mexican and Central American flags instead of American flags. Various talk-radio hosts and columnists played up the contentious nature of displaying non-U.S. flags during the protests. One particular incident referred to involved a protest at Montebello High School in California, where a Mexican flag was raised on a flagpole over a United States flag flying in the distressed (or upside-down) position.

As part of the backlash over the protests and the controversy over the flag symbolism issue, a group calling themselves "Border Guardians" burned a Mexican flag in front of the Mexican Consulate in Tucson, Arizona, on April 9, 2006. The following day the group proceeded to burn two Mexican flags during protest in Tucson which was estimated to have had 15,000 participants. After the police seized a student who had thrown a water bottle at the "Border Guardians", they followed the police officers calling for them to let the student go. As the situation escalated violence broke out and 6 were arrested with dozens being pepper-sprayed. The next day the police arrested the leader of the Border Guardians, Roy Warden, for charges including assault and starting a fire in a public park.

Because of the controversy, organizers of the protests encouraged protesters to leave their Mexican flags at home, with Cardinal Roger Mahony telling Los Angeles protesters to not fly any flag other than the United States flag because, "...they do not help us get the legislation we need." As a result of this controversy later protests featured fewer Mexican flags and more protesters carrying American flags.

In addition, California's Oceanside Unified School District banned flags and signs from its campuses after "Mexican flag-wavers clashed with U.S. flag-wavers."

== Backlash ==
The Washington Post reported that, in the Washington, D.C., suburb of Herndon, a day labor center at which suspected illegal individuals gathered was closed and its mayor and two aldermen lost reelection, in part due to immigration concerns.

Membership in the Minuteman Project increased due in part to backlash from the protests. On May 3, responding to the May 1 boycotts, the Minutemen embarked on a caravan across the United States in an effort to bring attention to a need for border enforcement. The caravan was expected to reach Washington, D.C., on May 12.

Regarding the Tucson-based anti-immigration movement: In 2006, the Southern Poverty Law Center wrote: "Roy Warden, 59, emerged this spring as one of the country's most controversial, volatile, and, many believe, dangerous characters of the anti-immigration movement."

== Consequences of the 2006 immigration protests ==
Although HR-4437 failed to pass through the Senate, it left a trail of consequences that affected the immigrant community. One of those consequences was intensive Immigration Customs Enforcement (ICE) raids during the final years of the Bush administration which continued throughout the Obama presidency. In the next couple of years, more than 300,000 illegal immigrants were deported to their home countries, that is 100,000 more than the number of deported immigrants in 2005, a year before the protests. The increase in deportations caused fear of retaliation within the illegal immigrant community and resulted in rapid demobilization.

Although HR-4437 did not become a law at the federal level, it did not prevent individual states from passing similar laws. In 2006, Pennsylvania passed the Illegal Immigration Relief Act, which fined landlords who rented housing to illegal immigrants and also fined business owners who hired them. The State of Arizona passed S.B. 1070, which led to racial profiling and required police officers to request legal documentation from anyone they suspected was residing in the country unlawfully. Both laws, along with similar others, were deemed unconstitutional in part because the U.S. Constitution assigns control over immigration to the federal government, not individual states.

== Social policy attitudes ==
The effects of the protests were not limited to governmental and policy changes, either. Public opinion in the Latino community showed clear development based on both temporal and spacial exposure to the protests. The Latino National Survey (LNS) took place during the course of the protests, with approximately 37% of respondents being surveyed before the protests began. Using the data from respondents before and after the advent of the protests, a study from The American Journal of Political Science compared immigration sentiments from before and after exposure to the 2006 protests. The table divided sentiments into three categories: amnesty, supporting immediate legalization; citizenship after time as a guest worker; or allowing guest workers temporary residence. Support for immediate legalization showed a 10% increase postprotest, while support for the temporary residence of guest workers dropped by 4%.

Predicted probabilities: Pre- and post-protest
	Pre-protest	Post-protest	Prob.
Amnesty	.34 (.02)	.44 (.01)	.10 (.02)
Guest worker legalization	.37 (.01)	.35 (.01)	-.2 (.02)
Guest worker temporary	.16 (.01)	.12 (.01)	-.4 (.02)

The LNS also showed that 75% of Latino citizens believed the passing of the bill through the House and resulting discourse would prompt more Latinos to vote. The portion of Latinos who said they thought neither political party had acceptable immigration policy also increased from the 9% reported in 2004 to 20% in the 2006 report. The effects of the immigration reform protests were felt across the United States, both in policy and public opinion.

== Latino political contributions and civic engagement ==
Since illegal immigrant communities were unable to vote, lobby, or influence politicians in more traditional ways, Latino leaders mobilized immigrants through non-voting activities, such as protests. Many Latinos indicated that the marches were the beginning of a new social and political movement that sought to gain civic empowerment. A report released by the Pew Hispanic Center indicated that Latinos would most likely vote in subsequent elections and The National Immigration Forum found that Latino voters were more enthusiastic to vote in 2006 due to the immigration debate, and the need to prevent legislation like HR-4437 from being approved by Congress. "Today we march, tomorrow we vote," was one of the most popular slogans during the 2006 immigrant protests. Such slogan indicated the value and need for Latino/a political contribution and recognition.

== Timeline ==
=== March ===
- March 10: 100,000 marched from Union Park to Federal Plaza in Chicago but organizers say that about 250,000- 500,000 actually marched.
- March 24: 20,000 marched to Senator Jon Kyl's office in Phoenix. Tens of thousands of workers participate in a work stoppage in Georgia.
- March 25: more than 500,000 (casual police estimate) march in downtown Los Angeles, but organizers claim more than 1.25 million based on photographic analysis
- March 26: 7,000 people rallied at the Statehouse in Columbus, Ohio.
- March 27: Hundreds of high school students walk out of class in protest in Northern Virginia .
- March 29: 8,000–9,000 marched from The Coliseum to Legislative Plaza in Nashville.
- March 30: Robert Pambello, the principal of Reagan High School in Houston, placed a Mexican flag below the American and Texan flags and was ordered to remove it. He later resigned from his position for apparently unrelated reasons. In South West Houston, high school students from Robert E. Lee High, Bellaire High, Sam Houston High School (joining from Houston's Northside) and other middle schoolers joined in a march that was taken to city hall.
- March 31: 3,000 high school and middle school students in Las Vegas walk out of class to protest. Some college and community college students join them on their protest.

=== April ===
- April 1: 10,000 marched across the Brooklyn Bridge to Foley Square in New York City.
- April 6: Hundreds of Aurora, Illinois students left school to march downtown to protest.
- April 8: Several hundred people rally at Chicano Park in San Diego.
- April 9: Demonstrations in several cities across the United States, including:
  - 50,000 marched in San Diego from Balboa Park, through downtown to the County Administration Building.

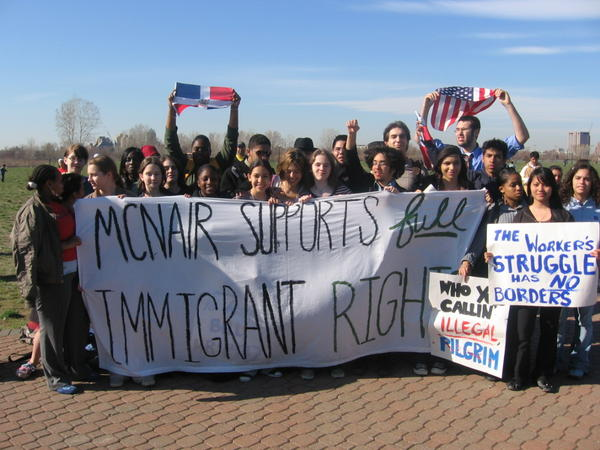
Students of Jersey City's McNair Academic High School gather to protest the proposed H.R. 4437 at Liberty State Park after walking out of their school at 2:00 pm on April 10, 2006.

  - 6,000 protested in Des Moines, Iowa at Nollen Plaza in support of comprehensive immigration reform., April 9
- April 10: Demonstrations were staged in many cities and towns across the United States;
  - Atlanta, Georgia, at least 50,000 people rallied both for and against amnesty.
  - Boston, Massachusetts, approximately 2,000 demonstrators march from Boston Common to Copley Square.
  - Charleston, South Carolina, at least 4,000 people gathered and protested the inability of lawmakers to agree on legislation that would lead to citizenship.
  - Fort Myers, Florida, an estimated 75,000 people took part in "The Great March" which affected traffic in nearby areas of the march. The stream of protesters was at least a mile long at times.
  - Las Vegas, a well-organized march of approximately 3,000 people was held. Protesters marched two miles from Jaycee Park to the Federal Courthouse during the first day of the Clark Country Spring Break, waving Mexican and American flags alike. They protested in favor of amnesty.
  - New York City, between 70,000 and 125,000 people demonstrated in front of City Hall. Senators Hillary Clinton and Chuck Schumer spoke at the rally. Neither called for amnesty, though many of the crowd's signs and chants did.
  - Oakland, California, an estimated 10,000 people took part in the demonstration.
  - Salt Lake City, Utah, a unity rally was held at the City-County Building; there were an estimated 15,000 protesters.
  - San Jose, California, an estimated 25,000 demonstrators marched several miles from King and Story to city hall. Highway access to US 101 and I-680 was closed, causing significant traffic backups.
  - Seattle, between 15,000 and 25,000 marched to a rally at the federal building where speakers in support of the demonstrators, such as Mayor Greg Nickels and County Executive Ron Sims spoke. Just five thousand were expected.
- April 11: Several protests occurred in Nevada.
  - In Las Vegas, a rally with an estimated minimum of 300+ was held at the Cashman Center; several important opposition figures showed up, such as Jim Gilchrist, the Nevada Secretary of State, local radio host Mark Edwards, and numerous state Minuteman Project branches to protest against amnesty.
  - In Carson City, Nevada, an estimated 200 students walked out of class, rallying in front of the Governor's Mansion.
  - In Reno, Nevada, between 2,000 and 4,000 protesters marched through the downtown area, from the University of Nevada, Reno campus to the Bruce R. Thompson Federal Building, and continued to a designated spot near the Meadowood Mall. Traffic was held and diverted along South Virginia Street during the march.
- April 13: Students from several Woodburn, Oregon (a town with a large Hispanic community) schools marched out of class.
- April 19: Students from various Denver high schools and middle schools walked out of class and marched to the capitol.
- April 27: Approximately 200 volunteers and supporters built a 6 foot high, quarter mile section of barbed wire fencing along the Mexico and United States border to send a clear message to Americans and leaders in Washington regarding the lack of security at our borders.
- April 28: "Nuestro Himno", a Spanish language rendition of the "Star Spangled Banner", is played simultaneously on about 500 Spanish language radio stations across the country. The controversy died in a few days, after it was revealed that Cuban immigrant Jon Secada had sung the anthem in Spanish at Bush inauguration ceremony, and that a Spanish version of the anthem had been commissioned by the Bureau of Education of the United States in 1919.

=== May ===
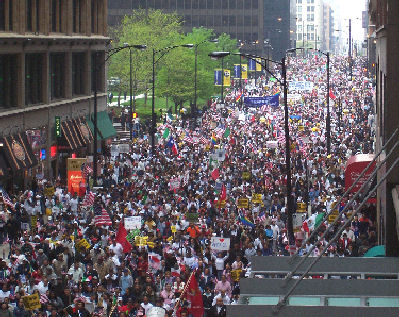
A rally on May 1 in Chicago

- May 1: The "Great American Boycott" takes place across the United States and at a few locations abroad.
  - An estimated 400,000 marched in Chicago, according to police, though organizers pegged the total at closer to 700,000; "Latinos were joined by immigrants of Polish, Irish, Asian and African descent."
  - An estimated 400,000 marched in Los Angeles, according to police.
  - The boycott was said to have had "little economic impact" in Arizona.
  - Modesto, California saw close to 10,000 people marching in the streets, possibly the largest assembly of people in the city's history. Major city streets were shut down as a direct result.
  - Over 15,000 protesters were reported in Santa Barbara, California.
  - Some supporters have hailed this as "the most important boycott since the days of the civil rights movement".
  - Over 100,000 marched in the Bay Area of California.
  - At least 10,000 marched in Orange County.
  - A minor disturbance in Vista, California was disbursed by 200 police officers.
  - Local news estimates that 3,000+ people marched from Jaycee Park in Las Vegas, Nevada; some local businesses suffered but the majority of businesses felt no financial impact.
  - According to LA Observed, an altercation occurred between protestors and police at MacArthur Park in Los Angeles.

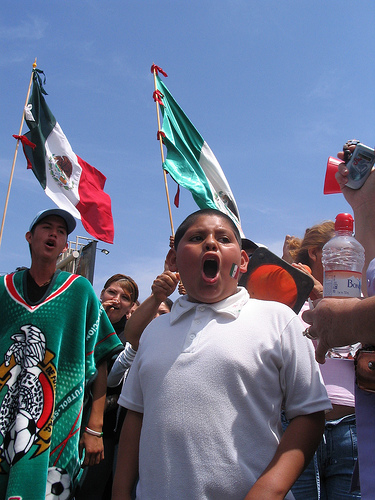
Immigrant rights protest at the US–Mexico border in Tijuana

  - Thousands of immigrants and their supporters did not go to work or school in Iowa United for the Dignity and Safety of Immigrants (UDSI) (organizing group estimates).
- May 2: The Minuteman Project says that 400 new members joined in April in response to the protests.
- May 3: In response to the pro-immigration reform boycott, the Minutemen started a two-vehicle caravan across the United States which reached Washington, D.C., on May 12.
- May 25: The United States Senate passes S. 2611 which includes a path to citizenship for up to 8.5 million illegal individuals. The bill eventually failed and was never enacted.

== Legislation ==
H.R. 4437 (The Border Protection, Anti terrorism, and Illegal Immigration Control Act of 2005) was passed by the United States House of Representatives on December 16, 2005, by a vote of 239 to 182. It is also known as the "Sensenbrenner Bill", for its sponsor in the House of Representatives, Jim Sensenbrenner. H.R. 4437 was seen by many as the catalyst for the 2006 U.S. immigration reform protests.

The Immigration Reform and Control Act of 1986 previously gave "amnesty" to 2.7 million illegal immigrants. Proponents of the measure, including then-President Reagan, said the measure, paired with stricter employer rules and a better path for legal entry, would reduce illegal immigration.

The companion bill passed by the United States Senate was S. 2611, which never passed conference committee. The House Republican leadership stated that it rejected S. 2611 wholly and would only pass legislation that addressed border security. The end of the 109th Congress marked the death of this bill.

== Kennedy ruling ==
The USA Supreme Court on June 16, 2008, ruled in Dada v. Mukasey, per ponente Justice Kennedy ruled (5–4) "that someone who is here illegally may withdraw his voluntarily agreement to depart and continue to try to get approval to remain in the United States." The Court held that complying with a deportation order did not strip an immigrant of the right to appeal that deportation order. The lawsuit is about 2 seemingly contradictory provisions of immigration law. One prevents deportation by voluntary departure from the country. The other section allows immigrants who are here illegally but whose circumstances have changed to build their case to immigration officials, and who must remain in the US. In the case, Samson Dada, a Nigerian citizen, overstayed beyond the expiration of his tourist visa in 1998. Immigration authorities ordered him to leave the country as he agreed to leave voluntarily, but to allow his legal re-entry, unlike if he had been deported.

== Organizations ==
The following organizations mobilized from hundreds (FAIR) to millions of people (Great American Boycott) around immigration reform in the United States during 2006.

- May 1, 2006 'A Day Without Immigrant' National Mobilization Endorsers' – national coalition of 215 organizations that mobilized one million protesters across the U.S. on May 1, 2006, for the Great American Boycott.
- We Are America Alliance – national network of hundreds of regional coalitions that mobilized 2 million protesters across the U.S. on April 10, 2006, and coordinated protests in the May 1 national protests
- El Paro and the Day Without and Immigrant Coalition (Philadelphia Region) Philadelphia regional coalition of dozens of organizations invited and mobilized thousands of protesters in 7 marches from February 14 to April 10, 2006.
- Kentucky Coalition for Immigrant and Refugee Rights – Kentucky coalition that mobilized an estimated 10,000 people in downtown Lexington, Kentucky on April 10, 2006, with other mobilizations around the state.
- March 25 Coalition – Southern California-based coalition that mobilized 750,000 protesters in Los Angeles on March 25, 2006
- Federation for American Immigration Reform (FAIR) – mobilized dozens of people in various counter-protests
- Minuteman Project – held sporadic counter-protests in some major US cities

=== Recruiting methods ===
Typically anti-illegal immigration movements focus on grassroots recruiting tactics; the Minutemen Civil Defense Corps and Minuteman Project use these methods to boost membership. After the 2006 immigration reform protest, anti-immigration movement participation increased by 600%.

==== Cooperation between anti-illegal immigration groups ====
Anti-illegal immigration groups often do not pursue the same agenda in the same ways; however, they do form coalitions when their agendas match other movements. One of the major joint efforts that these groups engage in is access to mailing lists for individuals who have donated money in the past to support the movement; Federation for American Immigration Reform and Minutemen Civil Defense Corps have shared lists of mailers with one another in recent years.

== See also ==
- H.R. 4437
- Immigrant Nation! The Battle for the Dream, documentary movie
- March 2006 LAUSD student walkouts
- S. 2611
- United States immigration debate
