= Comprehensive Immigration Reform Act =

Comprehensive Immigration Reform Act may refer to either of two bills in the United States Senate that did not become law:

- Comprehensive Immigration Reform Act of 2006 (S. 2611), a bill passed by the U.S. Senate
- Comprehensive Immigration Reform Act of 2007 (S. 1348), a bill introduced in the U.S. Senate but never voted upon
