= Republicans for Immigration Reform =

Super PAC

Republicans for Immigration Reform is a SuperPAC which aims at pushing for immigration reform in the United States and improving the Republican Party’s standing among Hispanics.

Promoted in early 2012 by former US Secretary of Commerce Carlos Gutierrez, its advocates hope it will help repair the political damage left by years of anti-illegal-immigrant rhetoric that has dominated GOP primaries and alienated crucial Hispanic voters. Gutierrez believes that "the far right of this party has taken the party to a place that it doesn't belong".

== See also ==
- Immigration to the United States
- S. 2611
- DREAM Act
