= Kagendo Murungi =

Kenyan LGBTQ rights activist and filmmaker

- Born: 7 December 1971; Kenya
- Died: 27 December 2017 (aged 46); Harlem, New York, U.S.
- Education: Rutgers University
- Occupations: LGBT rights activist, film director and producer

Kagendo Murungi (7 December 1971 – 27 December 2017) was a Kenyan feminist, LGBT rights activist and filmmaker. She worked as an advocate for the rights of African LGBTQ community for over 20 years.

== Biography ==
Kagendo was born in Kenya and had six siblings. She moved to the United States where she spent most of her lifetime.

== Career ==
Kagendo obtained her BA degree in women's studies from the Rutgers University and pursued her MA degree in media studies from the New School for Social Research. She pursued her career in film industry as a film director and producer. She founded the film production studio Wapinduzi Productions in 1991 and served as its executive producer for about 26 years. She narrated the story for the 1995 American documentary film These Girls Are Missing.

She was instrumental in creating a role of Africa program officer at the International Gay & Lesbian Human Rights Commission. She also served as a volunteer for the African Film Festival for 15 years. She also held the position of Program Associate with National Black Programming Consortium when she was still a community organiser. In 2016, she served as the director of the Food Pantry at the St. Mary's Church, Harlem.

In August 2021, she was listed as one of the seven African women activists who deserve a Wikipedia article by the Global Citizen, an international organisation and advocacy organisation.

== Death ==
She died on 27 December 2017 at the age of 46 in her residence in Harlem. She was buried in a family farm in Kenya.
