= Border Security, Economic Opportunity, and Immigration Modernization Act of 2013 =

Proposed immigration reform bill

Border Security, Economic Opportunity, and Immigration Modernization Act
- Long title: To provide for comprehensive immigration reform and for other purposes.
- Nicknames: The "immigration bill", the "Gang of Eight Bill"
- Announced in: the 113th United States Congress
- Sponsored by: Chuck Schumer (D-NY)

Codification
- Acts affected: Immigration and Nationality Act, Social Security Act, Internal Revenue Code of 1986, Illegal Immigration Reform and Immigrant Responsibility Act of 1996, Refugee Crisis in Iraq Act of 2007 and others.
- U.S.C. sections affected: 8 U.S.C. § 1101, 8 U.S.C. § 1184, 8 U.S.C. § 1182, 8 U.S.C. § 1153, 8 U.S.C. § 1324a, and others.
- Authorizations of appropriations: At least $1,970,500,000 with an additional unlimited amount
- Appropriations: At least $62,020,000,000 with an additional unlimited amount

Legislative history
- Introduced in the Senate as S.744 by Chuck Schumer (D-NY) on April 16, 2013; Committee consideration by United States Senate Committee on the Judiciary; Passed the Senate on June 27, 2013 (68–32)

The Border Security, Economic Opportunity, and Immigration Modernization Act of 2013 (Bill S.744) was a proposed immigration reform bill introduced by Sen. Chuck Schumer (D-NY) in the United States Senate. The bill was co-sponsored by the other seven members of the "Gang of Eight", a bipartisan group of U.S. senators who wrote and negotiated the bill. It was introduced in the Senate on April 16, 2013, during the 113th United States Congress.

The Senate Judiciary Committee held hearings on the bill in April 2013. The bill was voted out of committee on May 21, 2013, and was placed on the Senate calendar. On June 27, 2013, the Senate passed the bill on 68–32 margin. The bill was not considered by the Republican-controlled United States House of Representatives and died in the 113th Congress.

If enacted, the bill would have made it possible for many undocumented immigrants to gain legal status and eventually citizenship. It would have increased border security by adding up to 40,000 border patrol agents. It also would have advanced talent-based immigration through a points-based immigration system. New visas were proposed in this legislation, including a visa for entrepreneurs and a W visa for lower skilled workers. It also proposed new restrictions on H1B visa program to prevent its abuse and additional visas/green-cards for students with science, technology, engineering, and mathematics (STEM) degrees from U.S. institutions. The bill also included a $1.5 billion youth jobs program and repealed the Diversity Visa Lottery in favor of prospective legal immigrants who are already in the United States.

The non-partisan Congressional Budget Office estimated that this bill would have reduced the U.S. fiscal deficit by US$197 billion over 10 years and by $700 billion by 2033. The Social Security Administration said that it would help add $276 billion in revenue over the next 10 years while costing only $33 billion.

== Overview ==
The legislation would have made deep and broad changes to existing U.S. immigration law, affecting almost every U.S. government agency. Bill S.744 would have created a program to allow an estimated 11 million illegal immigrants in the United States gain legal status in conjunction with efforts to secure the border.

The bill would have provided a pathway to U.S. citizenship for illegal immigrants who had resided in the U.S. before December 31, 2011. Illegal immigrants would have been required to apply for a newly created Registered Provisional Immigrant status. To do so, immigrants would have had to pay a fine, fees, and any back taxes owed; pass a background check; and not have a disqualifying criminal record. The bill also included the DREAM Act and the AgJOBS Act. Immigrants who received Registered Provisional Immigrant status would have been able to apply for legal permanent resident status (in other words, a green card) as long as strict border security provisions were met (including increasing the number of U.S. Customs and Border Protection (CBP) agents and officers, constructing a double layer fence along certain parts of the Mexico–United States border, and meeting a target of stopping 90% of illegal border crossings. The bill would also have drastically altered the methods of visa allocation under current family-based and employment-based categories, and would have introduced a "merit-based" visa based on points accrued for educational achievements, employment history, and other contributions to society.

The bill contained many other provisions, including:

- Removal of per country green card quota limits, which would help in reducing backlogs. The wait time is in decades for some countries, and many high-skilled immigrants (including U.S.-educated immigrants) tend to return to their home countries due to the lack of a timely process.
- Creation of a new INVEST visa which would make it easier for prospective foreign entrepreneurs to stay in the U.S. and start companies. Data suggested that companies owned by immigrants were likely to hire more employees than companies owned by U.S. natives.
- Allotment of up to 25,000 more visas/green cards to foreign students who have earned advanced degrees in science, technology, engineering or mathematics (STEM). Research has shown that, on average, every 100 foreign students who remain in the United States after receiving a degree in science, technology, engineering or math create 262 additional jobs in the United States.
- Creation of a W visa to allow low-skilled temporary workers.
- Provision for expanded use of E-Verify by businesses in order to ensure that their workers have the legal right to work in the United States.
- Replacement of the H-2A visa program for agricultural workers with a new “blue card” for immigrants.
- Increasing the number of H1B visas and imposing restrictions on the companies who misuse the program.
- Allowing immigrants illegally brought to the U.S. as children to apply for registered provisional status, and adjusting that status to legal permanent residency after five years.
- Transferring the quota of green cards now assigned to the Diversity Visa Lottery program to immigrants with advanced skills. Under the current diversity visa lottery rules, lottery winners who have high school diplomas or "[t]wo years of work experience within the past five years in an occupation requiring at least two years' training or experience" are eligible for consideration.
- Creating a program to provide jobs to low-income and minimally-skilled American youth.

=== Congressional findings ===
The proposed congressional findings contained in the bill included the following:

- The United States has the right and the duty to maintain its sovereignty, to secure its borders and to promote its safety and prosperity;
- The U.S. will continue to welcome immigrants;
- The U.S. needs a "stable, just and efficient" immigration system;
- The U.S. should "control the flow" of legal immigration;
- Illegal immigration, in some instances, poses a threat to national security; it must be eliminated.

== Legislative history ==
=== Senate ===
The Border Security, Economic Opportunity, and Immigration Modernization Act was created by a group of eight United States senators: Four Republicans and four Democrats - nicknamed the "Gang of Eight:" Michael Bennet (D-CO), Dick Durbin (D-IL), Jeff Flake (R-AZ), Lindsey Graham (R-SC), John McCain (R-AZ), Bob Menendez (D-NJ), Marco Rubio (R-FL), Chuck Schumer (D-NY). S. 744 was introduced into the Senate by Senator Schumer on April 16, 2013, with the other seven members of the Gang of Eight serving as co-sponsors.

The bill was referred to the United States Senate Committee on the Judiciary, which held hearings and markups about the bill. The Judiciary Committee held hearings about the bill on April 19, April 22, and April 23, 2013. On May 9, May 14, May 16, and May 20, 2013, the committee held consideration and mark up sessions. On May 21, the committee ordered the bill to be reported, with amendments, favorably.

Several other committees also held hearings about the bill. The United States Senate Committee on Homeland Security and Governmental Affairs held hearings on May 7. The United States Senate Committee on Small Business and Entrepreneurship held hearings about the bill on May 16 and May 22.

On June 7, 2013, Senator Patrick Leahy, the chairman of the Senate Judiciary Committee, filed Report 113–40 to accompany S.744. The report included the views of the majority of the committee in favor of the bill, as well as minority views and opinions. The 187-page report includes information about why the new immigration legislation is needed, the history of the bill's consideration by the committee, a section by section summary of the bill, a copy of the Congressional Budget Office's report on the bill, some conclusions, and the minority views on the bill.

On June 11, 2013, the Senate voted 84-15 (all 52 Democrats, both Independents, and 30 Republicans voting in the affirmative) to proceed with debate. The Senate considered the bill on the floor on June 12–13, June 17–21, June 24–26, 2013. During this time, it was recommitted to the Senate Judiciary Committee twice to make amendments.

On June 24, 2013, the Senate passed an amendment providing for high-tech surveillance equipment and doubling the number of border agents to about 40,000.

On June 27, 2013, the Senate passed the bill by a vote of 68 to 32. All 52 Democrats, both Independents, and 14 Republicans voted in favor of the bill.

=== Developments following June 2013 Senate passage ===
The House of Representatives did not act on this bill. Conservative Republicans in the U.S. House of Representatives were opposed to it. House Republicans and Speaker John Boehner said that this bill would not receive a floor vote. Boehner stated that the House Republicans favored a piece-meal approach on immigration reform (i.e. several different bills instead of one comprehensive reform bill). Instead of putting the existing Senate bill up for vote and making necessary modifications, he asserted that the House GOP would draft another bill of its own without any path to citizenship and without some other changes (such as introducing a visa for entrepreneurs and delimiting the use of H1B visas to prevent their abuse) that the Senate bill offered. A statement of principles on immigration, released by congressional Republicans on January 30, 2014, said: “We will not go to a conference with the Senate’s immigration bill” and that “border security and interior enforcement must come first.”

Senator Chuck Schumer argued that the strategy of passing smaller-scale bills would not work and that Democrats would not support an enforcement bill without the promise of a path to citizenship for illegal immigrants. Former Florida governor Jeb Bush called on the GOP-led House to pass a comprehensive immigration bill and asked his party to quit being "the obstacle" on the divisive issue. Stephen Miller, communications director for Senator Jeff Sessions (R-AL) played a role in defeating the bill.

In the absence of a “comprehensive fix” from Congress, Obama announced on November 20, 2014 executive actions to “make our immigration system more fair and more just.” These actions included a long-contemplated program of "deferred action" which would allow an estimated 45% of unauthorized immigrants to legally stay and work in the United States. These executive actions were challenged in court.

== Provisions ==
=== Title I - Border Security ===
Title I, which begins on page 33, covers changes being made to border security in the United States. Some of the goals mentioned below are also addressed in the preceding sector One of the major provisions of S. 744 is a focus on increased border security, primarily dealt with in Title I. The bill establishes a goal of achieving a 90% success rate (Section 3(a)(3)) of intercepting and deporting illegal immigrants who attempt to cross the border in one of the "High Risk Border Sectors" - places where more than 30,000 people cross per year (Section 3(a)(5)). In order to accomplish this, the bill would increase the number of CBP officers by 3,500 people by 2017, authorize the National Guard to participate in missions related to border security, fund additional surveillance and surveillance technology, and provide funding to build a border fence.

After the enactment of the bill (should it be enacted), the United States Department of Homeland Security (DHS) has 180 days to write and submit two reports. First, the "Comprehensive Southern Border Security Strategy", which is a strategy meant to explain their plans for achieving and maintaining effective control in all high risk border sectors along the Southern border (established in Section 5(a)). The "Southern Border" refers to the international border between the United States and Mexico. The report will be submitted to several committees in Congress for review. Section 5(a)(2) explains the elements that should be included in the report, namely criteria for measuring success, capabilities that need to be obtained for the success of the strategy (equipment, personnel, etc.), and the infrastructure and technology required.pg 19-20 Congress grants the Department of Homeland Security $3,000,000,000 in order to pursue this strategy (Section 6(a)(3)(A)(i)).

The second report that the DHS is required to write and submit in 180 days is the "Southern Border Fencing Strategy" to identify where fencing, including double-layer fencing, infrastructure, and technology should be deployed along the Southern border (Section 5(b)). Congress grants the Department of Homeland Security $1,500,000,000 in order to pursue this strategy (Section 6(a)(3)(A)(iii)).

The bill would focus on three particular high risk sectors - the Tucson sector in Arizona and the Rio Grande and Laredo sectors in Texas. Title I focuses on preventing additional illegal immigration into the United States.

Title I includes a number of provisions which are explained more explicitly in the bill's text. This is a short list of some of them:

- Definitions: "Rural, high-trafficked areas" are rural areas through which drugs and illegal aliens are routinely smuggled, as designated by the Commissioner of U.S. Customs and Border Protection. The "Southwest border region" is the area in the United States that is within 100 miles of the Southern border.
- Additional U.S. Customs and Border Protection officers are added - 3,500 additional federal law enforcement officers to be trained by 2017
- Authorization for the National Guard to be deployed to the Southwest border for the following purposes:

(1) to construct fencing, including double-layer and triple-layer fencing;
(2) to increase ground-based mobile surveillance systems;
(3) to deploy additional unarmed, unmanned aerial systems and manned aircraft sufficient to maintain continuous surveillance of the Southern Border;
(4) to deploy and provide capability for radio communications interoperability between U.S. Customs and Border Protection and State, local, and tribal law enforcement agencies;
(5) to construct checkpoints along the Southern border to bridge the gap to long-term permanent checkpoints; and
(6) to provide assistance to U.S. Customs and Border Protection, particularly in rural, high-trafficked areas, as designated by the Commissioner of U.S. Customs and Border Protection.

- Authorizes and funds border crossing prosecutions and related court costs in the Tucson Sector at a level sufficient to increase the average number of prosecutions from 70 a day to 210 a day ($50 million from the $3 billion Border Security Fund). It also provides increased funding for Operation Stonegarden to assist state and local law enforcement to help prevent illegal activity along the border.
- Provides additional funding for additional border patrol stations and forward operating bases to interdict individuals entering the United States unlawfully immediately after such individuals cross the Southern border and to provide full operational support in rural, high-trafficked areas.
- Provides funding for vital radio communications and interoperability between CBP -Office of Border Patrol and state, local, and tribal law enforcement to assist in apprehension efforts along the border.

==== Border Security ====
The bill contains many border security measures, some of which must be implemented before illegal immigrants can adjust from the provisional status to full green card status. However, the DHS Secretary simply must submit a plan for border security within the first six months of the bill in order to initiate the provisional legal status for illegal immigrants. Senator Chuck Schumer (D-N.Y.) explained that whether or not the border is secure will have no impact on the advancement of the legalization of illegal immigrants, saying, "We're not using border security as an excuse or a block to the path to citizenship. [The Gang of Eight] wants to make sure the border is secure, but not to use it as a barrier to prevent the 11 million from eventually gaining a path to citizenship". The bill provides resources for additional CBP officers, improvements in the border security infrastructure, and increasing the number of immigration prosecutions. It also provides resources for and requires additional training for CBP officers.

The bill sets a goal of achieving a 90% success rate (Section 3(a)(3)) of intercepting and deporting illegal immigrants who attempt to cross the border in one of the "High Risk Border Sectors" - places where more than 30,000 people cross per year (Section 3(a)(5)). In order to accomplish this, the bill would increase the number of border security personnel by 3,500 people by 2017, authorize the National Guard to participate in missions related to border security, fund additional surveillance and surveillance technology, and provide funding to build a border fence. If the bill is enacted, the United States Department of Homeland Security (DHS) has 180 days to write and submit two reports. First, the "Comprehensive Southern Border Security Strategy", which is a strategy meant to explain their plans for achieving and maintaining effective control in all high risk border sectors along the international border between the United States and Mexico. Congress grants the Department of Homeland Security $3,000,000,000 in order to pursue this strategy (Section 6(a)(3)(A)(i)). The second report that the DHS is required to write and submit in 180 days is the "Southern Border Fencing Strategy" to identify where fencing, including double-layer fencing, infrastructure, and technology should be deployed along the Southern border (Section 5(b)). Congress grants the Department of Homeland Security $1,500,000,000 in order to pursue this strategy (Section 6(a)(3)(A)(iii)).

=== Title II - Immigrant Visas ===
Subtitle A--Registration and Adjustment of Registered Provisional Immigrants

The focus of Subtitle A is changing the status of illegal immigrants already present in the United States. The section creates the category of "registered provisional immigrant" (RPI) and outlines the steps necessary to obtain this status, as well as what qualities or characteristics of an illegal immigrant will prohibit them from obtaining it. Immigrants must apply to have their status changed. In order to be eligible, they must have started residing in the United States prior to December 31, 2011, and have been physically present since then. They must then pay a $500 penalty fee, are assessed taxes, and must pay application fees to cover the cost of their application.

Illegal immigrants are ineligible to change their status if they:

- were convicted of an aggravated felony
- were convicted of a felony
- were convicted of three or more misdemeanors
- were convicted of an offense under foreign law
- voted unlawfully
- or are judged to be inadmissible for criminal, national security, public health, or other morality grounds.

Additional provisions:

- Spouses and children of people in RPI status can be petitioned for as derivatives of the principal applicant (but must be in the United States at the time).
- Immigrants in RPI status can work for any employer and travel outside of the United States
- Individuals outside of the United States who were previously here before December 31, 2011, and were deported for non-criminal reasons can apply to re-enter the United States in RPI status if they are the spouse, of or parent of a child who is, United States citizen or lawful permanent resident; or are a childhood arrival who is eligible for the DREAM Act.
- The application period will be for one year with the possibility of extension by the Secretary for an additional year.
- Individuals with removal orders will be permitted to apply as will aliens in removal proceedings.
- RPI status shall last for a six-year term that is renewable if the immigrant does not commit any acts that would render the alien deportable. Another $500 penalty fee is applicable at this time.
- The Secretary may collect a processing fee from individuals who register for RPI status in an amount that is sufficient to recover all of the costs of implementing the registration program.
- An individual who has been granted RPI status is not eligible for any Federal means-tested public benefit (as such term is defined in section 403 of the Personal Responsibility and Work Opportunity Reconciliation Act of 1996 (8 U.S.C. § 1613)).
- An individual who adjusts from registered provisional immigrant status to lawful permanent residence shall be deemed, as of the date of such adjustment, to have completed the five-year period specified in 8 U.S.C. § 1612 and 8 U.S.C. § 1613.
- A noncitizen granted registered provisional immigrant status under this section shall be considered lawfully present in the United States for all purposes, while such noncitizen remains in such status, except that the noncitizen

is not entitled to the premium tax credit authorized under section 36B of the Internal Revenue Code of 1986; and
shall be subject to the rules applicable to individuals not lawfully present that are set forth in section 1402(e) of the Patient Protection and Affordable Care Act (42 U.S.C. § 18071).

- After 10 years, aliens in RPI status may adjust to Lawful Permanent Resident Status through the same Merit Based System everyone else must use to earn a green card (described below) if the following things have occurred:
  - The alien maintained continuous physical presence
  - They paid all taxes owed during the period that they are in status as an RPI
  - They worked in the United States regularly;
  - And demonstrated knowledge of Civics and English
  - All people waiting for family and employment green cards as of the date of enactment have had their priority date become current.
  - A $1,000 penalty fee is rendered

Section 2103, the DREAM Act (Development, Relief, and Education for Alien Minors Act of 2013) focuses on adjusting the immigration status of illegal immigrants who entered the United States as minor children. The Department of Homeland Security can change the immigration status of immigrants who arrived in the United States before turning 16, have been registered provisional immigrants for at least five years, and has earned an education in the United States (by graduating high school, getting a GED, attending 2 or more years of college education at a bachelor's degree level or higher) or spend four or more years in the Uniformed Services (with an honorable discharge). DREAM Act kids can get their green cards in five years and will be eligible for citizenship immediately after that.

Section 2104 - Additional requirements creates rules about how the data immigrants submit as part of their application can be used, limiting it to immigration related purposes. It also establishes some procedures for reviewing immigration status decisions and challenging them in court. Section 2105 - Criminal penalty describes the penalties (a fine of up to $10,000) to anyone who deliberately misuses immigration data by using it, publishing it, or permitting it to be examined.

==== Registration and adjustment of registered provisional immigrants ====
Title II of S. 744 focuses on three things: (1) creating the registered provisional immigrant (RPI) status, which illegal immigrants in the United States are eligible to apply for, (2) creating an Agricultural Workers Program, and (3) changing the existing rules governing the legal immigration process. This includes changing the requirements for family-based immigration, economic-based immigration, and merit-based immigration.

The bill creates a new immigration status, entitled Registered Provisional Immigrant status. Illegal immigrants who get adjusted under the bill would not be legal permanent residents yet, but they would be in a legal status and would no longer be considered to be present illegally. They would also be permitted to work lawfully. In order to receive this status, illegal immigrants would need to apply (which would have the effect of registering them with the U.S. government, hence the title of the status), pay both a fine and a fee, pay any owed back taxes to the IRS, learn English, and not have any disqualifying criminal history. Initially the status would be good for 6 years, with the possibility of having it extended for an additional 4 years. After a total of 10 years, then registered provisional immigrant would then have the opportunity to apply for legal permanent resident status, so long as the other triggers in the bill had taken place.

The triggers in the bill that would need to occur before registered provision immigrants could proceed to legal permanent resident status and ultimately to citizenship are related to 1) border security: there are several in this area but the key one requires that 90% of those attempting to cross the southwest border illegally be stopped; and 2) visa backlog reduction: other areas of the bill create changes in the visa allocation system intended to eliminate the visa backlog, and this must happen before adjustments from registered provision immigrant to legal permanent resident. This is the "back of the line" provision; the idea is that illegal immigrants who gain status from this bill should not be able to become legal permanent residents sooner than someone who had legally filed a visa petition earlier and had been waiting for the approved visa to become available.

=== Title II - Immigrant Visas cotd. ===
Subtitle B--Agricultural Worker Program

Chapter 1--Program for Earned Status Adjustment of Agricultural Workers

subchapter a--blue card status
subchapter b--correction of social security records

Chapter 2--Nonimmigrant Agricultural Visa Program Chapter 3--Other Provisions

==== Agricultural Worker Program ====
Another key part of the bill is the agricultural worker program. The program consists of two subprograms, a so-called "Blue Card" status and a nonimmigrant agricultural visa program, or guest worker program.

==== Blue Card Status ====
The Blue Card program is a temporary legal status (similar to the Registered Provisional Immigrant status) that will be available to illegal immigrants who can demonstrate that they have been in the United States performing qualifying agricultural work for a certain amount of time. Workers who obtain this status will have the opportunity later to adjust to legal permanent resident status if they meet certain conditions.

=== Title II - Immigrant Visas ===
Subtitle C--Future Immigration This section begins on page 256.

Subtitle C focuses on reforming current legal immigration law. This includes provisions about family members of U.S. citizens immigrating into the country, merit-based systems of immigration, and immigration related to work visas.

==== Future immigration ====
The bill makes many changes to current immigration system designed to control future flows of immigration. These include repeal of the diversity visa program, changes in several family-based visa classifications (e.g. elimination of sibling petitions for U.S. citizens and conversion of a petition by a legal permanent resident for a spouse or child to an immediate relative petition rather than a preference petition), and the ability to adjust future levels of worker visas (both those created by this bill and under current programs) based on economic conditions.

The bill also creates "merit-based" visas, which immigrants will eventually be able to apply for on the basis of a point system which awards points for various criteria, including educational achievement, involvement in society, entrepreneurship, and other factors.

The combined effects of the changes are intended to be greater control over future amounts of immigration and also the type of immigrant; the changes also reduce the share of family-based visa overall in favor of a greater number of employment-based and merit-based visas.

=== Title II - Immigrant Visas ===
Changes to family-based immigration:

  - There are four preference categories (1, 2A, 2B, 3, and 4) based on family relationships and a minimum of 226,000 and up to 480,000 visas are allocated to these family preferences (in practice, it has always been 226,000 per year for the last decade). Under the new system there will be two family preference categories and they will cover unmarried adult children; married adult children who file before age 31, and unmarried adult children of lawful permanent residents (the current 1, age-restricted 3, and 2B preferences respectively, with 2A being made unrestricted). The bill would expand the current V visa to include those with family relationships.
  - The bill repeals the availability of immigrant visas for siblings of U.S. citizens (the fourth preference) once 18 months have elapsed since the date of enactment. This preference has 2,473,114 backlogged applications as of the end of FY2012, and a wait time of 12 years (considerably longer for Mexico and the Philippines).
  - The bill amends the definition of “immediate relative,” which provides for unlimited access to visas and includes spouses, children, and parents of U.S. citizens, to include a child or spouse of an alien admitted for lawful permanent residence (the current 2A preference), and the child or spouse of an alien who is accompanying or following to join the child, parent or spouse of a U.S. citizen or lawful permanent resident. The 2A preference has the lowest demand and shortest waiting time, but also a relatively large allocation of visas which could be used to help clear the backlogs in the other preferences.
  - The bill amends the existing category for married sons and daughters of citizens of the United States (the third preference) to bar anyone from entering who is over 30 years of age. This preference has 830,906 backlogged applications as of the end of FY2012, and a wait time of 10.5 years (considerably longer for Mexico and the Philippines).
  - The bill repeals the Diversity Visa Program. Aliens who were or are selected for diversity immigrant visas for fiscal years 2013 or 2014 will be eligible to receive them. See Section 2303 - Repeal of the diversity visa program.

Changes to employment-based immigration:

  - On the employment green card categories, the bill exempts the following categories from the annual numerical limits on employment-based immigrants: derivative beneficiaries of employment-based immigrants; aliens of extraordinary ability in the sciences, arts, education, business or athletics; outstanding professors and researchers; multinational executives and managers; doctoral degree holders; physicians with completed foreign residency requirements; graduate degree (conferred by U.S. universities) holders in STEM field with US employment; and physicians who have completed the foreign residency requirements or have received a waiver.
  - The bill then allocates 40 percent of the worldwide level of employment-based visas to members of the professions holding advanced degrees or their equivalent whose services are sought in the sciences, arts, professions, or business by an employer in the United States (including certain aliens with foreign medical degrees).
  - The bill increases the percentage of employment visas for skilled workers, professionals, and other professionals to 40 percent, maintains the percentage of employment visas for certain special immigrants to 10 percent and maintains visas for those who foster employment creation to 10 percent.
  - The bill creates a startup visa for foreign entrepreneurs who seek to emigrate to the United States to startup their own companies.

Merit-based visa system:

  - The merit-based visa system is described in Section 2301 - Merit-based points track one and Section 2302 - Merit-based track two. The merit based visa, created in the fifth year after enactment, awards points to individuals based on their education, employment, length of residence in the US and other considerations. Those individuals with the most points earn the visas. Those who access the merit based pathway to earn their visa are expected to be talented individuals, individuals in our worker programs and individuals with family here. 120,000 visas will be available per year based on merit. The number would increase by 5% per year if demand exceeds supply in any year where unemployment is under 8.5%. There will be a maximum cap of 250,000 visas.
  - Under one component of this merit based system the Secretary will allocate merit-based immigrant visas beginning on October 1, 2014, for employment-based visas that have been pending for three years, family-based petitions that were filed prior to enactment and have been pending for five years, long-term alien workers and other merit based immigrant workers.

=== Title III - Interior Enforcement ===
Title III of the Border Security, Economic Opportunity, and Immigration Modernization Act contains the following subtitles:

- Subtitle A--Employment Verification System
- Subtitle B--Protecting United States Workers
- Subtitle C--Other Provisions
- Subtitle D--Asylum and Refugee Provisions
- Subtitle E--Shortage of Immigration Court Resources for Removal Proceedings
- Subtitle F--Prevention of Trafficking in Persons and Abuses Involving Workers Recruited Abroad
- Subtitle G--Interior Enforcement
  - Section 3713 repeals 8 U.S.C. § 1481(a)(6) (the Renunciation Act of 1944)

==== Interior enforcement ====
The bill contains provisions for enhancing interior enforcement of immigration laws, including requiring the implementation of E-Verify for verification of the status of employees and increased protections of U.S. workers.

=== Title IV - Reforms to Nonimmigrant Visa Programs ===
Title IV of the Border Security, Economic Opportunity, and Immigration Modernization Act contains the following subtitles:

- Subtitle A--Employment-based Nonimmigrant Visas
- Subtitle B--H-1B Visa Fraud and Abuse Protections
  - Chapter 1--H-1B Employer Application Requirements
  - Chapter 2-- Investigation and Disposition of Complaints Against H-1B Employers
  - Chapter 3--Other Protections
- Subtitle C--L Visa Fraud and Abuse Protections
- Subtitle D--Other Nonimmigrant Visas
- Subtitle E--JOLT Act (the Jobs Originated through Launching Travel Act of 2013)
- Subtitle F--Reforms to the H-2B Visa Program
- Subtitle G--W Nonimmigrant Visas
- Subtitle H--Investing in New Venture, Entrepreneurial Startups, and Technologies

==== Nonimmigrant Agricultural Visa Program ====
This program will be the new agricultural guest worker program, and will replace the current H-2A program which will be repealed by the bill. This program increases the number of workers available, and makes several key changes, such as allowing "permanent" guest workers (in the sense that the nonimmigrant agricultural visa would be portable from employer to employer as seasons change, rather than requiring a new visa for each season as the current H-2A program does) rather than only seasonal workers as the current H-2A program does. The bill also increases worker protections and raises minimum wages for agricultural workers.

Farm owners and farm workers have generally joined in support of these provisions of the bill.

==== Reforms to Nonimmigrant Visa Programs ====
The bill makes numerous reforms to nonimmigrant visa programs, including the H-1B, L, student visa, visitor visa, and H-2B programs. The reforms are designed to in some cases make the programs easier to use, and also to enhance the systems used to monitor compliance by nonimmigrant visa holders with the visa requirements.

The annual cap on H-1B visas is increased substantially (from 85,000 to 205,000), but additional recruiting requirements are added that require positions first be posted on a government website for 30 days and offered first to qualified U.S. workers. The Department of Labor is given greater authority to review and challenge hiring decisions. Technology firms are lobbying against these provisions of the bill, arguing that it creates unwarranted governmental intrusion into internal hiring decisions and hampers the companies' ability to attract the most qualified employees from abroad. Senator Hatch of Utah has introduced an amendment that would remove these requirements.

=== Specific programs ===
==== E-Verify ====
E-Verify is an "Internet-based system that allows businesses to determine the eligibility of their employees to work in the United States." The Border Security, Economic Opportunity, and Immigration Modernization Act would require all employers to use the E-Verify system, phasing employers in based on company size over five years. The E-Verify system would also be enhanced by various changes specified in the law. One of those changes is the development of a photo matching system. All people (U.S. citizens included) will be required to show their employers a photo ID, such as a driver's license, passport, or (in the case of legal immigrants) their "biometric work authorization card" or "biometric green card." Their potential employer is required to look up the potential employee in the E-Verify database and compare the two pictures. Provisions are also made so that employees can "lock" their Social Security numbers in order to prevent other people from illegally using their same number somewhere else. The United States Customs and Immigration Services will have access to this system in order to track Social Security numbers with suspicious usage and attempt to catch the perpetrators.

==== INVEST visa ====
Title IV, Subtitle H of the bill creates the INVEST visa (Investing in New Venture, Entrepreneurial Startups, and Technologies) for immigrant entrepreneurs. This new visa program would allow immigrant entrepreneurs to come to the United States, start businesses, and create jobs in America. There would be two types of INVEST visas. A nonimmigrant INVEST visa would be renewable provided certain initial investment, annual revenue, and job creation criteria are met within an initial three-year period. The immigrant version of the INVEST visa would have basically the same criteria just at higher thresholds.

== Reactions ==
=== E-Verify ===
The E-Verify system, which the bill would have required all employers to use, was controversial. The bill would have required that all employees receive government verification that they were permitted to work in the United States. This provision has been criticized by organizations such as the American Civil Liberties Union for changing the nature of the relationship between people and the government by creating a society based on receiving permission. In announcing their white paper on the subject, the ACLU wrote "In an attempt to stop the tiny percentage of those starting jobs in the United States each year who are unauthorized workers, E-Verify would force everyone to obtain affirmative permission from government bureaucracies before engaging in the core life functions of working and earning a living." Concerns about E-Verify also included the potential for abuses and hacking of the databases used by the program, issues related to errors that wrongly prevent people from being hired, and concerns about bringing the United States closer to having a national ID card.

=== Fiscal impact ===
A May 2013 study published by the Heritage Foundation claimed the bill would have resulted in a net cost of $6.3 trillion. The study's methodology and findings were sharply criticized across the political spectrum. Tim Kane, a scholar formerly with the Heritage Foundation, said that "[the] pileup of outlandish Heritage estimates presents a credibility hurdle."

A report by the nonpartisan Congressional Budget Office found that, instead, the bill would have saved $175 billion over 10 years.

== See also ==
- Department of Homeland Security (DHS)
- U.S. Customs and Border Protection ( CBP)
- U.S. Immigration and Customs Enforcement (ICE)
- List of United States immigration legislation
- Gang of Eight (immigration)
- Borders of the United States
- Immigration to the United States
- Illegal immigration to the United States
- Citizenship in the United States
- Secure Fence Act of 2006
