= Well-Founded Fear =

- "Sec(101): Persecution on account of race, religion, nationality, membership in a particular social group or political opinion."
- Directed by: Shari Robertson; Michael Camerini
- Produced by: Shari Robertson; Michael Camerini
- Cinematography: Michael Camerini
- Edited by: Karen Schmeer; Suzanne Pancrazi; Christopher Osborn
- Music by: Mark Suozzo
- Production companies: The Epidavros Project, Inc.
- Distributed by: The Epidavros Project, Inc; Roco Films International
- Release dates: January 31, 2000 (Sundance Film Festival); June 5, 2000 (PBS)
- Running time: 119 minutes
- Country: United States
- Language: English

Well-Founded Fear is a 2000 documentary film from directors Shari Robertson and Michael Camerini. The film takes its title from the formal definition of a refugee under the UN Convention Relating to the Status of Refugees, as a person who deserves protection, "owing to a well-founded fear of persecution for reasons of race, religion, nationality, membership of a particular social group or political opinion.” The film analyzes the US asylum process by following several asylum applicants and asylum officers through actual INS interviews.

== Synopsis ==
On average, only one in two hundred asylum applicants is ever admitted as a refugee to the U.S. A refugee is defined as someone afraid to return home for fear of persecution on account of race, religion, nationality, social group or political opinion. Any foreign citizen who is able to find a path into the U.S. is eligible to apply for refugee protection in the form of political asylum. At the time of filming, the former Immigration and Naturalization Service (INS) handled all requests for asylum.

Behind the doors of the asylum office lies a dramatic real-life stage where American ideals about human rights collide with the nearly impossible task of trying to know the truth. The film shows the closed corridors of the INS for an extraordinary close-up look at what has been called the Ellis Island of the 21st Century. It is an intimate world never before seen on screen—asylum officers, lawyers, translators, economic migrants, legitimate refugees looking for protection, all focused on the confidential interviews that are the heart of the asylum process.

Cases examined within the film involve individuals originating from China, El Salvador, Albania, Nigeria, Romania, Algeria, France and Russia. The film reveals the challenges of determining the validity of claims made in the asylum interview process.

The film closes with several onscreen statements about how the asylum application process has changed since filming. Congress passed legislation which reduces the number of people who are eligible to apply for asylum. The legislation also jails individuals arriving at U.S. borders requesting asylum. Additionally, the legislation limited an individual's right to appeal some of the decisions from asylum officers.

== Release ==
Well-Founded Fear was featured as an Official Selection at the 2000 Sundance Film Festival where The Hollywood Reporter called it “one of the most talked-about and attended films at the festival.” The film was broadcast on PBS, through P.O.V. on June 5, 2000. It was also broadcast on CNN and CNN satellite stations as CNN Presents: Asylum in America. It played at Docfest 2000, where it was lauded as The Grand Jury Prize Winner.

The film has screened at festivals in San Francisco, New Zealand, Finland and many cities across the United States. It has been an Official Selection at:

- The Human Rights Watch International Film Festival, London;
- San Francisco International Film Festival;
- DoubleTake Documentary Film Festival, Durham, NC;
- Cleveland International Film Festival; Wisconsin Film Festival, Madison;
- Old Dominion Film Festival, Norfolk, VA;
- Taos Talking Pictures Film Festival, NM;
- Philadelphia Festival of World Cinema;
- UNAFF (United Nations Association Film Festival);
- CineVegas International Film Festival;
- The New Zealand International Film Festival;
- Documentary Guild's Uptown-Downtown Film Festival, Helsinki, Finland

The film has been specially screened at New York University, The School of International and Public Affairs, Columbia University, Austin Film Society's "Texas Documentary Tour," Office of Refugee Resettlement National Conference in D.C., Carnegie Endowment for International Peace in D.C. and The Refugee Studies Centre at University of Oxford.

== Critical reception ==
The film has a wide mix of reviews from commentators, reformers, and educators. The film is currently used in universities and law schools across the United States. It is in regular use by the Asylum Training Corps in the Department of Homeland Security, as well as hundreds of law offices across the U.S.

The New York Times review wrote “the two-hour documentary by Shari Robertson and Michael Camerini takes an amazingly unflinching look at the process for seeking political asylum in the United States. The viewer who sticks with it ends up rewarded but deeply rattled, on several levels.” The New York Daily News review of the P.O.V. broadcast called the film “a very strong show,” highlighting that “the close-ups, when people learn of their fates, are unforgettable, as are some of the very candid admissions by the INS interviewers. And by all means, stay tuned until the very end, because the updates at the end will both amaze and amuse you.” Esquire cited the film as “a reason to (still) watch PBS... [and] a reminder of the power public television can still generate when it’s firing on all of its high-minded cylinders.” At the 2000 Independent Spirit Awards, the film was nominated the Truer than Fiction award.

== Modules ==
Due to the film’s success in the classroom and other education situations, two discussion modules were produced to accompany the film.

- Tales From Real Life provides an in-depth look at five memorable people from countries around the globe, all seeking asylum in the United States. Each case study, of an actual asylum interview, provides window into a very different life experience:
1. Lyudmila, a Jewish ex-soviet from Belarus, living in Minsk, who feels persecuted by her neighbors and strangers.
2. Jamal, a Sudanese political dissident who was tortured and is intent on describing his entire story.
3. Gjergi, an Albanian, kidnapped by the secret-police and beaten after writing an article in his high school newspaper.
4. Alfonso, a Guatemalan who is modest about how he was affected by civil war.
5. Mareja, a former Yugoslavian, unable to prosecute her abusive husband because his Communist Party family ruled the region.
- Practicing Asylum Law is geared especially toward the needs of advocates, legal professionals and their clients. It offers concrete examples for discussion and analysis, along with notes and commentary by experts and Asylum Office insiders. This module illustrates the interactions between attorneys and asylum officers. Practicing Asylum Law also includes an extended feature about the dangers of translation, showing actual examples of mistakes made during asylum interviews.

=== Additional resources ===
The filmmakers developed an educational website, commissioned by POV for their broadcast of the film in 2000. The website allows users to play an online game where they can "step into the job of asylum officer for a few minutes and try deciding a case themselves." Gerald, an INS asylum officer who appears in the film is featured in the online game.

== See also ==
- How Democracy Works Now: Twelve Stories
- Convention Relating to the Status of Refugees
- Refugee
- Immigration
- Shari Robertson
- Michael Camerini
