= Gang of Eight (immigration) =

2013 group of US senators

The Gang of Eight was a bipartisan group of eight United States senators—four Democrats and four Republicans—who wrote the Border Security, Economic Opportunity, and Immigration Modernization Act of 2013.

In June 2013, S.744 passed the Senate with a strong majority—68–32, with 14 Republicans joining all Democrats. The United States House of Representatives under Speaker John Boehner did not act on the bill, however, and it expired at the end of the 113th Congress.

During the 2016 Republican Party presidential primaries, Marco Rubio, who was running for president, faced attacks from opponents such as Ted Cruz and Donald Trump for his role in the Gang of Eight.

== Members ==
In the context of proposed immigration reform, the Gang of Eight consists of the following four Democratic and four Republican senators. Of the eight senators that originally composed the group, three remain in office as of 2026. John McCain died in 2018, Jeff Flake retired in 2019, Bob Menendez resigned in 2024 because of his conviction in a political corruption case, Marco Rubio resigned in 2025 to become Secretary of State and Lindsey Graham died in 2026.

- Sen. Michael Bennet, D-CO
- Sen. Dick Durbin, D-IL
- Sen. Jeff Flake, R-AZ
- Sen. Lindsey Graham, R-SC
- Sen. John McCain, R-AZ
- Sen. Bob Menendez, D-NJ
- Sen. Marco Rubio, R-FL
- Sen. Chuck Schumer, D-NY

== Policies ==
According to a National Law Review article, the policies envisioned by the Gang of Eight include the following provisions:

- A path to citizenship for illegal immigrants already in the United States is contingent on certain border security and visa tracking improvements. The plan provides for permanent residence for illegal aliens only after legal aliens waiting for a current priority date receive their permanent residence status and a different citizenship path for agricultural workers through an agricultural worker program.
- Business immigration system reforms, focusing on reducing current visa backlogs and fast tracking permanent residence for U.S. university student visa graduates with advanced degrees in science, technology, engineering or math also known as the STEM fields.
- An expanded and improved employment verification system for all employers to confirm employee work authorization.
- Improved work visa options for low-skilled workers including an agricultural worker program.
