= Border Protection, Anti-terrorism and Illegal Immigration Control Act of 2005 =

U.S. House of Representatives bill

The Border Protection, Anti-terrorism, and Illegal Immigration Control Act of 2005 (H.R. 4437) was a bill in the 109th United States Congress. It was passed by the United States House of Representatives on December 16, 2005, by a vote of 239 to 182 (with 92% of Republicans supporting, 82% of Democrats opposing), but did not pass the Senate. It was also known as the "Sensenbrenner Bill," for its sponsor in the House of Representatives, Wisconsin Republican Jim Sensenbrenner. The bill was the catalyst for the 2006 U.S. immigration reform protests and was the first piece of legislation passed by a house of Congress in the United States illegal immigration debate. Development and the effect of the bill was featured in "The Senate Speaks", Story 11 in How Democracy Works Now: Twelve Stories a documentary series from filmmaking team Shari Robertson and Michael Camerini.

== Provisions ==
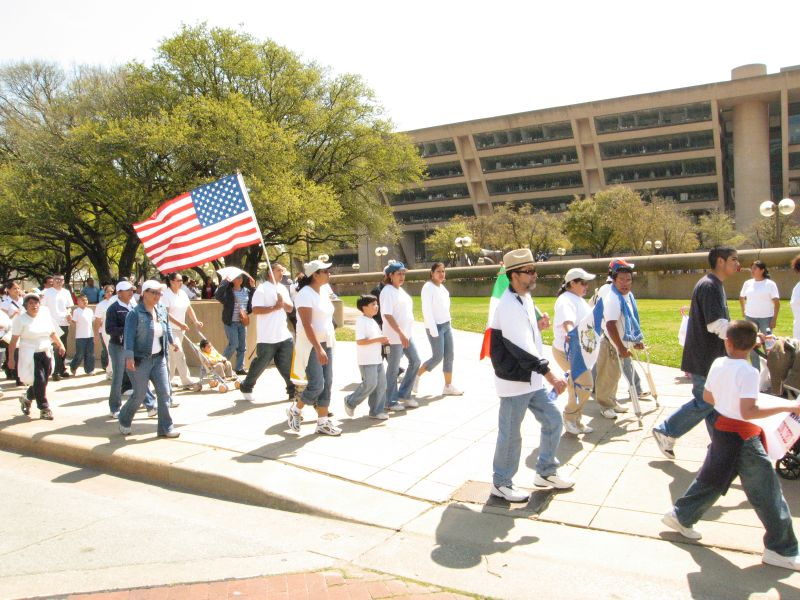
A march in front of Dallas City Hall protesting HR4437

The bill, passed by the House of Representatives, contains the following provisions among others:

- Requires up to 700 miles (1120 km) of double-layered fence along the Mexico–US border at points with the highest number of illegal border crossings. (House Amendment 648, authored by Duncan Hunter (R-CA52)
- Requires the federal government to take custody of illegal aliens detained by local authorities. This would end the practice of "catch and release", where federal officials sometimes instruct local law enforcement to release detained illegal aliens because resources to prosecute them are not available. It also reimburses local agencies in the 29 counties along the border for costs related to detaining illegal aliens. (Section 607)
- Mandates employers to verify workers' legal status through electronic means, phased in over several years. Also requires reports to be sent to Congress one and two years after implementation to ensure that it is being used. (Title VII)
- Requires the Department of Homeland Security (DHS) to report to Congress on the number of Other Than Mexicans (OTMs) apprehended and deported and the number of those from states that sponsor terrorism. (Section 409)
- Formalizes congressional condemnation of rapes by smugglers along the border and urges Mexico to take immediate action to prevent them. (House Amendment 647, authored by Ginny Brown-Waite)
- Requires all illegal aliens, before being deported, to pay a fine of $3,000 if they agree to leave voluntarily but do not adhere to the terms of their agreement. The grace period for voluntary departure is shortened to 60 days.
- Requires DHS to conduct a study on the potential for border fencing on the Canada–US border.
- Sets the minimum sentence for fraudulent documents at 10 years, fines, or both, with tougher sentencing in cases of aiding drug trafficking and terrorism.
- Establishes a Fraudulent Documents Center within DHS.
- Increases penalties for aggravated felonies and various frauds, including marriage fraud and document fraud.
- Establishes an 18-month deadline for DHS to control the border, with a progress report due one year after enactment of the legislation.
- Requires criminal record, terrorist watch list clearance, and fraudulent document checks for any illegal immigrant before being granted legal immigration status.
- Reimburses states for aiding in immigration enforcement.
- Causes housing of a removed alien to become a felony and sets the minimum prison sentence to three years.
- Allows deportation of any illegal alien convicted of driving under the influence (DUI).
- Adds human trafficking and human smuggling to the money-laundering statute.
- Increases penalties for employing illegal workers to $7,500 for first time offenses, $15,000 for second offenses, and $40,000 for all subsequent offenses.
- Prohibits accepting immigrants from any country which delays or refuses to accept its citizens who are deported from the United States (Section 404)

=== Prohibiting aid to illegal immigrants ===
It would be a crime to assist an illegal immigrant to "remain in the United States... knowing or in reckless disregard of the fact that such person is an alien who lacks lawful authority to reside in or remain in the United States". Furthermore, the prison term applicable to a removed alien, would also be applicable to anyone who knowingly aids or assists" that alien "to reenter the United States".

Previous laws already prohibited "aiding and abetting" illegal immigrants. This bill, however, is specifically intended to increase enforcement against human smugglers.

=== Amendments ===
- Eliminates the Diversity Immigrant Visa (also known as Green Card Lottery) program. (House Amendment 650, authored by Bob Goodlatte)
- Prohibits grants to federal, state, or local government agencies that enact or maintain a sanctuary city policy. (House Amendment 659, authored by Thomas Tancredo) (withdrawn 12/16/2005 by unanimous consent)
- Incorporates satellite communications among immigration enforcement officials. (House Amendment 638, authored by John Carter)
- Requires all United States Border Patrol uniforms to be made in the U.S. to avoid forgeries. (House Amendment 641, authored by Rick Renzi)
- Institutes a timeline for deployment of US-VISIT to all land-based checkpoints. (House Amendment 642, authored by Michael N. Castle)
- Amendment 656 failed. The bill's original (Republican) language changed the existing penalty for first illegal entry from a misdemeanor to a felony. This amendment from Rep. Sensenbrenner would have changed the bill's felony language back to misdemeanor, leaving this aspect of the existing law intact. The amendment was defeated by a vote of 164 to 257. Republicans voted 156 to 65 for the amendment, to change felony back to misdemeanor. Democrats voted 191 to 8 against the amendment, to leave the bill's language as a felony. During the spring of 2006, at the peak of the protest marches, Democrats used this felony aspect to rally protesters against the bill as a whole. This strategy is often referred to as a "poison pill".

== Debate ==
The House version of the bill was opposed by a variety of migrant, social justice, humanitarian, and religious organizations, and other groups. Among the criticisms raised by opposition groups are that the proposed legislation might negatively affect over 11 million illegal immigrants and those associated with them, that it includes measures which create substantial barriers to community policing, and that it represents the most draconian anti-illegal immigration bill in nearly a century.

The bill does not specify one particular group over any other; passage of the bill would affect all illegal aliens living within the U.S. The fact that most of the protests to date have come largely from Mexican and Hispanic based population centers may stem from the fact that Hispanics are the largest undocumented-immigrant group in the country.

On the supportive side of the issue, it is argued that living illegally in the United States is civil infraction, and that this bill merely aims at re-cementing U.S. immigration codes that have long been neglected by changing the seriousness of the infraction from a civil to a criminal one. Supporters of the bill argue that it will increase border security by providing more US Immigration and Customs Enforcement agents to the border, thereby helping to curtail any possible entry to the country by terrorists, and that the passage of this bill may help curtail drug trafficking and human trafficking from Mexico to the US by depriving smugglers of sources and contacts on the US side of the border.

Detractors say the bill includes measures that will infringe on the human rights of asylum seekers by stripping important due process protections, criminalizing status over which they may have no control, and dramatically limiting their access to essential services. Opponents of the bill argue that it would also redefine illegal immigrants as felons, and punish anyone guilty of providing them assistance. In addition, it would create several new mandatory minimum penalties for a variety of offenses, including some that would expose humanitarian workers, public-school teachers, church workers, and others whose only object is to provide relief and aid to five-year mandatory minimum prison sentences.

Contrary to some reports, the bill would not have involved massive numbers of deportations. It might have increased the ease of deporting of people caught by local law enforcement, but there are no provisions to actively search for illegal immigrants as happened during Operation Wetback.

Los Angeles Archbishop Roger Mahony spoke out on provisions in the immigration bills, he wrote to President Bush that certain proposed measures would effectively outlaw the provision of charitable assistance and religious ministry to individuals not in valid immigration status. On Ash Wednesday, 2006, Cardinal Mahony announced that he would order the clergy and laity of the Archdiocese of Los Angeles to ignore H.R. 4437 if it were to become law. He personally lobbied senators Barbara Boxer and Dianne Feinstein to have the Senate consider a comprehensive immigration reform bill, rather than the enforcement-only bill that passed the House of Representatives. Mahony also blamed the Congress for the illegal immigration crisis due to their failure to act on the issue in the previous 20 years, opposed H.R. 4437 as punitive and open to abusive interpretation, and supported S. 2611.

== Response ==
Millions of individuals have protested against the legislation because of the perception that it will result in mass deportation. Leaders in the movements involved have called for Congress to pass a bill that allows unauthorized immigrants to receive legal status. The United States Senate is considering bills (e.g. S. 2611) that will strike some of the provisions from H.R. 4437, such as the sections declaring illegal presence to be a felony (illegal entry is currently a misdemeanor) and criminalizing aid to illegal aliens. In addition, many cities and counties have taken formal positions opposing the bill. Labor unions have also largely opposed the bill, though there is division among the labor movement as to whether to support a guest worker program, or legalization of those currently present, two provisions currently in some of the Senate bills.

The debate has to an extent polarized opinions among U.S. citizens on illegal immigration. Gallup , CNN , CBS/New York Times , Los Angeles Times/Bloomberg , NBC/Wall Street Journal and several other polls taken have consistently shown public support for the senate immigration bill allowing certain immigrants to earn legal status over the harsher H.R. 4437. However, The Center for Immigration Studies, a pro-immigration reduction organization, conducted a Zogby poll that showed that Americans supported the House approach of enforcement instead of the Senate comprehensive approach.

"A day without an immigrant", where unauthorized immigrants and those who supported them were encouraged to abstain from buying anything and to skip work or school, was organized, taking place on Monday, May 1, 2006. The intention was to show the American public that their economy is helped by undocumented immigrants. It resulted in at least one million marchers nationwide. Major marches were held in Los Angeles, New York, Chicago, Dallas, while smaller events occurred in most states, most prominently in Pennsylvania, Virginia, and North Carolina. Crowds in Los Angeles were estimated at 600,000 for the two boycott marches. At the second largest protest, in Chicago, an estimated 400,000 attended. Not all the organizations in the immigration rights movement supported the boycott and resulted in varied participation rates. The effect the day had on the economy remains largely unknown.

On May 11, 2006, Senate leaders declared that they would try to pass an immigration bill of their own by the end of the month, S. 2611.

On May 13, 2006, President George W. Bush asked the Pentagon to deploy the United States National Guard to assist border patrol agents. The deployment was to be limited to 6,000 troops.

== Film ==
The Senate Speaks, Story 11 in How Democracy Works Now: Twelve Stories a documentary series from filmmakers Shari Robertson and Michael Camerini, that examines the push for comprehensive immigration reform in the United States from 2001 to 2007. Since its release the film has become an important resource for advocates, policy-makers and educators.

The Senate Speaks centers around the response to the Sensenbrenner bill's passage in the House. The film presents the immigrant movement's public response to the toughest anti-amnesty, enforcement-only immigration bill in history. Focus is placed on party leaders' pressure to respond. The film continues to tell the story of the bi-partisan immigration reform that the Senate passed in 2006 as an alternative approach to H.R. 4437.

== See also ==
- Anti-terrorism legislation
- Gran Marcha
- How Democracy Works Now: Twelve Stories
