= Congress.org =

Website providing information on the United States Congress

- Available in: English
- Headquarters: 50 F St. NW; Suite 700; Washington, D.C. 20001
- Owner: The Economist Group
- Editor: Scott Montgomery
- Website: www.congress.org
- Registration: Optional to send letters to Congress
- Launched: 2009
- Current status: Online

Congress.org is a website run by the CQ-Roll Call Group, which provides information on actions of the United States Congress and news about federal advocacy and activism. One tool on the site helps users find their elected officials and send e-mail to them, though in March 2013 that feature was removed without explanation.

== Overview ==
Congress.org states on its website that it is a "nonpartisan news and information website dedicated to encouraging civic participation". It was started by Capitol Advantage, a Virginia firm that provides software and information to clients who wish to influence public policy. Its software products Capwiz and Knowledgis are described by Washington Technology as "online software and services for lobbyists".

In 2008, the Roll Call Group bought Capitol Advantage.

The company, now known as the CQ-Roll Call Group, relaunched the website in 2009 with a focus on advocacy issues and general interest news on Congress.

The site features reporting on grassroots activism and Congressional advocacy groups by Ambreen Ali. It also runs online videos featuring veteran Washington reporter Craig Crawford.

The site has sponsorship from the American Beverage Association, whose members include The Coca-Cola Company, Dr Pepper, Gillette, Kraft Foods, Nestlé and PepsiCo, among others.
