= Immigration reform in the United Kingdom =

Immigration reform in the United Kingdom is a term used in political discussion regarding changes to the current immigration policy of the United Kingdom.

In the United Kingdom, the Strangers into Citizens campaign has been supported by the Liberal Democrats. Labour MP John McDonnell, the IPPR (a Labour-leaning think-tank) and Boris Johnson (the Conservative Prime minister) have also backed selective amnesty for illegal immigrants. The Liberal Democrat proposal would regularise the status of illegal immigrants who have lived in the country for at least ten years and who do not have a criminal record. Advocates have argued that bringing such individuals (estimates range from 300,000 to 800,000) into the legal economy would raise tax revenue, save on policing expenses, and reduce expenditures on deportation.

More recently, UK Prime Minister Cameron announced "a series of proposals to curb immigration", noting that the overall quantitative inflow of foreigners has increased considerably since 2004. The UK Independence Party, having apparently "harnessed" voter "frustration" about immigration levels, got 12.6% of the vote in the May 2015 parliamentary elections, up from 3.1% in January 2010, winning one seat in the House of Commons.

== See also ==
- Immigration, Asylum and Nationality Act 2006
