= National Immigration Forum =

American advocacy group

- Founded: 1982
- Type: Non-profit
- Purpose: Value of immigrants to America
- Location: Washington, D.C.
- Website: www.forumtogether.org

The National Immigration Forum is an immigrant advocacy non-profit group, based in Washington, D.C. It was founded by Phyllis Eisen and Rick Swartz, with Swartz as the president and Eisen as the vice president. The Forum uses its communications, advocacy and policy expertise to advocate for immigration, refugees and funding to foreign nations.

Jennie Murray has served as the group's president & CEO since 2022.

The Forum focuses on four main priorities:

- Immigration Reform and Workforce Needs – Shaping the policies necessary to make our immigration system serve the national interest, meeting the needs of our economy, workers, and families.
- Integration and Citizenship – Creating the opportunities necessary for immigrants to succeed and contribute to the growth and prosperity of America.
- Borders and Interior Enforcement – Developing fiscally responsible and humane policies that protect America and promote commerce, while respecting the rights of workers and employers, families, and communities.
- State and Local Immigration Developments – Promoting the principle that immigration law and enforcement are federal responsibilities.
