= Immigration reform =

Change to the current immigration policy of a country

Immigration reform is change to the current immigration policy of a country. In its strict definition, reform means "to change into an improved form or condition, by amending or removing faults or abuses". In the political sense, "immigration reform" may include promoted, expanded, or open immigration, as well as reduced or eliminated immigration.

The United Kingdom's decision to leave the European Union was in part driven by significant portions of the electorate having grievances about immigration law and the free movement of peoples into the UK.

== List ==
Rank	Country	Program	Years	Approximate beneficiaries	Notes	Reference
1	United States	Immigration Reform and Control Act (IRCA)	1986–1989	2,700,000	USCIS data.	
2	Colombia	Temporary Protection Statute (ETPV/PPT)	2021–present	2,000,000–2,300,000	UNHCR data.	
3	Peru	Venezuelan Admission, PTP/CPP Regularization and Humanitarian Protection	2017–2024	1,600,000–1,800,000	UNICEF and Peruvian government data.	
4	Spain	2026 Regularization Program	2026	1,000,000–1,200,000	Migration Policy Institute.	
5	United States	Deferred Action for Childhood Arrivals (DACA)	2012–present	835,000+	USCIS data.	
6	Peru	Humanitarian Response for Venezuelan Children	2018–present	603,494	UNICEF data.	
7	Italy	Bossi–Fini Regularization	2002	650,000	European Commission data.	
8	Spain	Spanish Regularization Program	2005	578,375	Migration Policy Institute.	
9	Argentina	Plan Patria Grande	2006–2010	420,000+	Argentine government data.	
10	Greece	National Regularization Programs	1998–2001	370,000	IOM data.	
11	Portugal	Extraordinary Regularization Programs	1992–2004	180,000+	IOM data.	

== See also ==
- Immigration reform in the United States
- Immigration reform in the United Kingdom
- Immigration detention in Australia
