= Comprehensive Immigration Reform Act of 2006 =

Proposed American bill

The Comprehensive Immigration Reform Act (CIRA, S. 2611) was a United States Senate bill introduced in the 109th Congress (2005–2006) by Sen. Arlen Specter (R-PA) on April 7, 2006. Co-sponsors, who signed on the same day, were Sen. Chuck Hagel (R-NE), Sen. Mel Martínez (R-FL), Sen. John McCain (R-AZ), Sen. Ted Kennedy (D-MA), Sen. Lindsey Graham (R-SC), and Sen. Sam Brownback (R-KS).

The bill dealt with immigration reform. It proposed to increase some security along the southern United States border with Mexico, allow long-term illegal immigrants to gain legal status, and to increase the number of guest workers over and above those already present in the U.S. through a new "blue card" visa program. The sponsor of the Bill, Senator Arlen Specter, introduced it on April 7, 2006. It was passed on May 25, 2006, by a vote of 62-36. Cloture was invoked, which limited debate to a 30-hour period. The parallel House Bill H.R. 4437 would have dealt with immigration differently. Neither bill became law because the two houses were not able to reach an agreement to go to a conference committee. The end of the 109th Congress (January 3, 2007) marked the defeat of both bills.

== Background ==
In 2006 there were estimated to be between 8 and 20 million illegal immigrants living within the United States, with the most common estimates being around 11 to 12 million. Further complicating the issue is the extreme poverty present in Mexico and other Latin American countries, the high demand for unskilled labor in the United States, the alleged inadequacy of current legal immigration routes, and the presence of drug and human smuggling on the border. On December 16, 2005, the House of Representatives passed H.R. 4437, which solely focused on US-Mexican border security and penalties for employers, smugglers, and those, such as churches and charity workers, providing assistance to illegal immigrants. One of the most controversial aspects of the house bill aimed to change illegal presence in the United States from a civil offense to a felony.

== Analysis ==
The major difference between H.R. 4437 and S. 2611 was the proposed legalization for illegal immigrants in S. 2611. The Senate legislation allowed illegal immigrants who have been in the country for more than five years, estimated to be 7 million in number, to apply for citizenship by paying fines and back taxes. Illegal immigrants who have been in the country for 2 to 5 years, numbering around 3 million, would be allowed to stay in the country without fear of deportation, but after 3 years would have to leave the U.S. and could apply for citizenship abroad. Those in the country for under 2 years would be required to return to their original nations. Thus, with some waiting, 10 million illegal immigrants could be eligible to become citizens. The fine is around $2000, but some sources say it might be higher.

The Bill also introduces a H-2C visa, or "blue card." This visa allows employers to bring in outside workers for up to 6 years, after which the employee must spend one year in their original country. The Bill proposes 370 miles (600 km) of fencing along highly populated areas near the border; H.R. 4437 proposes 700 miles (1,100 km) of fencing. The Bill does not mention any expanded role for local law enforcement for border enforcement tasks (primarily for interior enforcement) the way that H.R. 4437 does. There is an added clause, the Inhofe Amendment, an English-only proposal that makes English the "national language" of the United States aiming at discouraging services in any other language than English.

The bill would also increase the annual cap for H-1B work visas from 65,000 to 115,000, with an automatic 20% increase year on year, thus increasing the number of information technology and other professionals from foreign countries eligible to work in the U.S. It also would lower the standard by which judges determine who is eligible for refugee status from "clear and convincing evidence" to "substantial evidence."

It would allow illegal immigrants who later become legal to collect Social Security benefits based on social security credits earned while they were illegal. Also, the United States federal government would have to consult with Mexican officials before commencement of any fence construction on the U.S. side of the border.

This bill has been compared to the Immigration Reform and Control Act of 1986.

== Provisions ==
The Bill set forth border security and enforcement provisions, including provisions respecting:

(1) personnel and asset increases and enhancements; (2) a National Strategy for Border Security; (3) border security initiatives, including biometric data enhancements and a biometric entry-exit system, document integrity, and mandatory detention of aliens apprehended at or between ports of entry; and (4) Central American gangs.

- Prohibits state and local law enforcement officers from helping the federal government enforce immigration violations, which they are presently allowed to do.
- Provides that the total number of aliens and dependents of such aliens who receive legal permanent resident status shall not exceed 18,000,000 during each 10-year period beginning with the period extending from 2007 through 2016.
- Border Tunnel Prevention Act - Provides criminal penalties for construction, financing, or use of illegal border tunnels or passages.
- Border Law Enforcement Relief Act of 2006 - Authorizes a border relief grant program for a tribal, state, or local law enforcement agency in a county: (1) no more than 100 miles (160 km) from a U.S. border with Canada or Mexico; or (2) more than 100 miles (160 km) from any such border but which is a high impact area.
- Sets forth interior enforcement provisions, including provisions respecting: (1) alien terrorists; (2) alien street gang members; (3) illegal entry and reentry; (4) passport and immigration fraud; (5) criminal aliens; (6) voluntary departure; (7) detention and alternatives; (8) criminal penalties; (9) alien smuggling; (10) tribal lands security; (11) state and local enforcement of immigration laws; (12) expedited removal; and (13) alien protection from sex offenders.
- Makes it unlawful to knowingly hire, recruit, or refer for a fee an unauthorized alien.
- Establishes in the Treasury the Employer Compliance Fund.
- Provides for additional worksite and fraud detection personnel.
- Provides for a report examining the impacts of the current and proposed annual grants of legal status, including immigrant and nonimmigrant status, along with the current level of illegal immigration, on U.S. infrastructure and quality of life.
- Establishes a temporary guest worker program (H-2C visa). Provides: (1) that the Secretary of Homeland Security shall determine H-2C eligibility; (2) for a three-year admission with one additional three-year extension; (3) issuance of H-4 nonimmigrant visas for accompanying or following spouse and children; (4) for U.S. worker protection; (5) for implementation of an alien employment management system; and (6) establishment of a Temporary Worker Task Force.
- Expands the S-visa (witness/informant) classification.
- Limits the L-visa (intracompany transfer) classification.
- Fairness in Immigration Litigation Act of 2006 - Sets forth provisions respecting remedies for immigration legislation.
- Sets forth backlog reduction provisions respecting: (1) family-sponsored and employment-based immigrant levels; (2) country limits; (3) immigrant visa allocations; (4) minor children; (5) shortage occupations; and (6) student and advanced degree visas.
- Widows and Orphans Act of 2006 - Establishes a special immigrant category for certain children and women at risk of harm.
- Immigrant Accountability Act of 2006 - Provides permanent resident status adjustment for a qualifying illegal alien (and the spouse and children of such alien) who has been in the United States for five years and employed (with exceptions) for specified periods of time.
- Authorizes mandatory departure and immigrant or nonimmigrant reentry for a qualifying illegal alien who has been present and employed in the United States since January 7, 2004. Establishes a three-year mandatory departure status, and sets forth immigration prohibitions and penalties for failure to depart or delayed departure. Subjects the spouse or children of a principal alien to the same conditions as such alien, except that if such alien meets the departure requirement the spouse and children will be deemed to have done so.
- Agricultural Job Opportunities, Benefits, and Security Act of 2006, or AgJOBS Act of 2006 - Establishes a pilot program (Blue Card program) for adjustment to permanent resident status of qualifying agricultural workers who have worked in the United States during the two-year period ending December 31, 2005, and have been employed for specified periods of time subsequent to enactment of this Act.
- Revises the H-2A Visa (temporary agricultural worker) program.
- Development, Relief, and Education for Alien Minors Act of 2006 or the DREAM Act of 2006 - Eliminates denial of an unlawful alien's eligibility for higher education benefits based on state residence unless a U.S. national is similarly eligible without regard to such state residence. Authorizes cancellation of removal and adjustment to conditional permanent resident status of certain alien students who are long-term U.S. residents.
- Sets forth provisions respecting: (1) additional Department of Homeland Security (DHS) and Department of Justice immigration personnel; and (2) the Board of Immigration Appeals.
- Kendell Frederick Citizenship Assistance Act - Provides that fingerprints provided by a qualifying individual at the time of military enlistment shall satisfy naturalization fingerprint requirements. Requires the Secretary of Defense to establish the position of Citizenship Advocate at each military entry processing station.
- State Court Interpreter Grant Program Act - Provides state courts grants to assist individuals with limited English proficiency to access and understand court proceedings, and allocates funds for a related court interpreter technical assistance program.
- Border Infrastructure and Technology Modernization Act - Provides for: (1) a port of entry infrastructure assessment study; (2) a national land border security plan; and (3) a port of entry technology demonstration program.
- September 11 Family Humanitarian Relief and Patriotism Act - Provides permanent resident status adjustment or cancellation of removal and permanent resident status adjustment for a qualifying alien who was on September 10, 2001, the wife, child, or dependent son or daughter of a lawful nonimmigrant alien who died as a result of the September 11, 2001, terrorist attacks against the United States.

Sets forth provisions respecting: (1) noncitizen Armed Forces membership; (2) non-immigrant status for athletes; (3) extension of returning worker exemption; (4) surveillance programs, including aerial and unmanned aerial surveillance; (5) a Northern Border Prosecution Initiative; (6) reimbursement of Southern Border State and county prosecutors for prosecuting federally initiated drug cases; (7) conditional nonimmigrant worker-related grants; (8) border security on federal land; and (9) parole and status adjustment relief for qualifying widows and orphans.

== See also ==
- H.R. 4437
- SKIL Bill
