= How Democracy Works Now: Twelve Stories =

How Democracy Works Now
- Directed by: Shari Robertson; Michael Camerini
- Produced by: Shari Robertson; Michael Camerini; Series Coordinating Producer: Rachel Salmon; Senior Associate Producer: Jeni Morrison
- Cinematography: Michael Camerini
- Edited by: Senior Series Editor: Mark Juergens; Editors: Jane Rizzo
- Music by: Mark Suozzo
- Production company: The Epidavros Project Inc.
- Country: United States
- Language: English

How Democracy Works Now is a 10-part, feature documentary film series that examines the American political system through the lens of immigration reform during 2001–2007. The films were directed and produced by award-winning filmmaking team Shari Robertson and Michael Camerini.

How Democracy Works Now premiered on HBO with the broadcast debut of the first five films produced, including The Senators' Bargain on March 24, 2010. A directors' cut of The Senators' Bargain was featured in the 2010 Human Rights Watch Film Festival at Lincoln Center, with the theatrical title Last Best Chance. The second story in the 10-part series, Mountains and Clouds, opened the festival in the same year. The films toured the United States as part of the Human Rights Watch traveling film festival, and have been exhibited in special events at Columbia University, the Five College Consortium, Georgia College and State University, CUNY and numerous other universities.

The remaining five films were completed in 2013 for a three-day series debut at the 51st New York Film Festival. The full series of 10 feature-length films was streamed on Netflix in 2014. Immigration Battle, another film that is a capstone to the series, premiered on PBS's Frontline in October 2015. Since its debut, How Democracy Works Now has become an important resource for advocates, policy-makers and educators, while Forbes described it as "without question ... the best documentary film series on government ever produced."

== Release schedule ==
How Democracy Works Now Production Status
	Status	Premiere Platform	Festivals and Screenings	Release date
Story 1: The Game Is On	Released	HBO	Goethe-Institut	2010
Story 2: Mountains and Clouds	Released	HBO	Human Rights Watch; Goethe-Institut	2010
Story 3: You Never Know	Not in Production			N/A
Story 4: Sam in the Snow	Released	HBO	Goethe-Institut	2010
Story 5: The Kids Across the Hill	Released	NYFF	Goethe-Institut	2013
Story 6: Marking Up The Dream	Released	HBO	Goethe-Institut	2010
Story 7: Ain't the AFL for Nothin'	Released	NYFF		2013
Story 8: The Road to Miami	Not in Production			N/A
Story 9: Protecting Arizona	Released	NYFF		2013
Story 10: Brothers and Rivals	Released	NYFF		2013
Story 11: The Senate Speaks	Released	NYFF	Goethe-Institut; Philanthropy NY	2013
Story 12: Last Best Chance AKA The Senator's Bargain	Released	HBO (as "The Senators' Bargain")	Human Rights Watch; Goethe-Institut	2010

== Reception ==
How Democracy Works Now films have received a positive response. It also received positive reviews from The New York Times, The Boston Globe, Reuters, Congress.org, New American Media and Newsweek. Publications have cited the films as important resources for advocates and policy makers. Variety said the films had the potential to "help change hearts and minds".

== See also ==
- Well-Founded Fear
