= Michael Camerini =

- Occupations: Film director and producer
- Organization(s): The Epidavros Project, Inc., Epidoko Pictures
- Spouse: Shari Robertson
- Website: The Epidavros Project; How Democracy Works Now

Michael Camerini is a British-born American film director, producer and cinematographer. His filmmaking credits include FRONTLINE: Immigration Battle, Niger:Tales of Resilience, How Democracy Works Now, Well-Founded Fear, These Girls Are Missing, Becoming the Buddha in L.A., Dadi's Family and Born Again: Life in a Fundamentalist Baptist Church. His films have been featured on HBO, CNN, PBS, Human Rights Watch International Film Festival in London and New York City and The Sundance Film Festival among others.

Camerini aims for a filmmaking style that is non intrusive and that encourages people to tell their own stories. Camerini currently lives in New York City where he and his filmmaking partner, Shari Robertson, have a production company, The Epidavros Project, Inc.

== Filmography ==
Year	Film	Credits	Awards
2016	Niger: Tales of Resilience	Co-Producer/Director; Cinematographer	
2015	Frontline: Immigration Battle	Co-Producer/Director; Cinematographer	World Premiere at the 53rd NY Film Festival/ PBS Frontline
2013	How Democracy Works Now	Co-Producer/Director; Cinematographer	2013 Entire Series Premiered at Lincoln Center New York Film Festival and then streamed on Netflix 2010 HBO Broadcast of "The Game is On" "Mountains and Clouds" "Sam in the Snow" "Marking Up the Dream" and "Senators' Bargain" Official Selection Human Rights Watch Film Festival
2000	Well-Founded Fear	Co-Producer/Director; Cinematographer	Grand Jury Prize Winner Docfest 2000 Official Selection Sundance Film Festival 2000 Official Selection Human Rights Watch Film Festival, London
1997	Tashilham	Co-Producer/Director; Cinematographer	
1995	These Girls Are Missing	Co-Producer/Director; Cinematographer	Cine Golden Eagle, The National Educational Film Festival Silver Prize, 31st Chicago International Film Festival
1993	Becoming the Buddha in L.A.	Co-Producer/Director; Cinematographer	
1990	Kamala and Raji	Co-Producer/Director; Cinematographer	
1987	Born Again: Life in a Fundamentalist Baptist Church	Co-Producer/Director; Cinematographer	Blue Ribbon, American Film Festival; Cine Golden Eagle
1987	The Frescoes of Diego Rivera	Co-Producer/Director; Cinematographer	
1981	Dadi's Family	Co-Producer/Director; Cinematographer	

== See also ==
- Shari Robertson
- How Democracy Works Now
- Well-Founded Fear
