= Shari Robertson =

American film director and producer

- Occupation(s): Film director and producer
- Organization(s): The Epidavros Project, Inc., Epidoko Pictures
- Spouse: Michael Camerini
- Website: The Epidavros Project; How Democracy Works Now

Shari Robertson is an American film director and producer. Her filmmaking credits include How Democracy Works Now, Well-Founded Fear, These Girls Are Missing, Inside the Khmer Rouge, Return to Year Zero and Washington/Peru: We Ain't Winnin'. Her films have been featured on HBO, CNN, PBS, BBC, Channel 4, Human Rights Watch International Film Festival in London and New York City and The Sundance Film Festival among others.

Robertson’s career started with projects in the Southern Highlands rainforest of Papua New Guinea. Since then, her films have explored social and political stories in Cambodia and Thailand, Peru and Africa before concentrating on immigration reform and political asylum in the U.S. Robertson currently lives in New York City where she and her filmmaking partner, Michael Camerini, have a production company, The Epidavros Project, Inc.

== Filmography ==
Year	Film	Credits	Awards	
2016	Niger: Tales of Resilience		Co-Producer/Director; Cinematographer	
2015	Frontline: Immigration Battle		Co-Producer/Director; Cinematographer	World Premiere at the 53rd NY Film Festival/ PBS Frontline
2013	How Democracy Works Now		Co-Producer/Director; Cinematographer	2013 Entire Series Premiered at Lincoln Center New York Film Festival and then streamed on Netflix 2010 HBO Broadcast of "The Game is On" "Mountains and Clouds" "Sam in the Snow" "Marking Up the Dream" and "Senators' Bargain" Official Selection Human Rights Watch Film Festival
2000	Well-Founded Fear		Co-Producer/Director; Cinematographer	Grand Jury Prize Winner Docfest 2000 Official Selection Sundance Film Festival 2000 Official Selection Human Rights Watch Film Festival, London
1997	Tashilham		Co-Producer/Director; Cinematographer	
1995	These Girls Are Missing		Co-Producer/Director; Cinematographer	Cine Golden Eagle, The National Educational Film Festival Silver Prize, 31st Chicago International Film Festival
1992	Washington/Peru: We Ain’t Winning (TV)	Director; Producer		
1990	Inside the Khmer Rouge	Director	Gold Special Jury Prize for Documentary Worldfest, Houston	
1989	Angkor Wat Under Siege (TV)	Director		
1987	Return to Year Zero (TV)	Director; Producer		

== See also ==
- Michael Camerini
- Well-Founded Fear
- Twelve Stories: How Democracy Works Now
