= Index of articles related to Mexican Americans =

A Mexican American (Spanish: mexicano-estadounidenses or mexicanoamericanos) is a resident of the United States who is of Mexican descent. Mexican American-related topics include the following:

== 0-9 ==
- 1st Arizona Volunteer Infantry
- 1st New Mexico Volunteer Infantry, Reorganized
- 1917 Bath riots
- 1938 San Antonio pecan shellers strike
- 1994 California Proposition 187
- 2nd Regiment New Mexico Volunteer Infantry
- 2006 Harris County, Texas hate crime assault
- 2019 El Paso shooting

== A ==
- Abolish ICE
- Alianza Federal de Mercedes
- Always Running
- American GI Forum
- American-Mexican Claims Commission
- Anti-Mexican sentiment
- Arizona SB 1070
- Asco (art collective)
- August 29th Movement
- Aztlán

== B ==
- Balmy Alley
- Barrioization
- Battle of Chavez Ravine
- Beaner
- Bernal v. Fainter
- Bisbee Deportation
- Black-brown unity
- Blaxican
- Bless Me, Ultima
- Bloody Christmas (1951)
- Borderlands/La Frontera: The New Mestiza
- Borderlands Theater
- Botiller v. Dominguez
- Bracero program
- Bracero Selection Process
- Brown Berets
- Brown-eyed soul
- Brown, Not White
- Burrito

== C ==
- Caballero
- California agricultural strikes of 1933
- California Joint Immigration Committee
- Californio
- Caló (Chicano)
- Cantaloupe strike of 1928
- Católicos por La Raza
- Center for Mexican American Studies at Arlington
- Centro Cultural de la Raza
- Cesar Chavez Day
- Cesar Chavez (film)
- Chicana Rights Project
- Chicana/o studies
- Chicano
- Chicano English
- Chicana feminism
- Chicanafuturism
- Chicanismo
- Chicana art
- Chicano art movement
- Chicano Blowouts
- Chicano films
- Chicano literature
- Chicano Moratorium
- Chicano Movement
- Chicano nationalism
- Chicano poetry
- Chicano Park
- Chicano rock
- Chicano rap
- Cholo (subculture)
- Church in the Barrio
- Colegio César Chávez
- Comisión Femenil Mexicana Nacional
- Community Service Organization
- Conferencia de Mujeres por la Raza
- Coyolxauhqui imperative
- Cuisine of the Southwestern United States
- Culture Clash (performance troupe)

== D ==
- Deferred Action for Childhood Arrivals
- Delano grape strike
- Department of Homeland Security v. Regents of the University of California
- Desert Blood
- Dirty Girls Social Club

== E ==
- East L.A. walkouts
- East Los Streetscapers
- El Congreso de Pueblos de Habla Española
- El Malcriado
- El Teatro Campesino
- Emplumada
- Espinoza v. Farah Manufacturing Co.
- Estrada Courts
- Estrada Courts murals

== F ==
- Flores-Figueroa v. United States
- Frito Bandito
- From This Wicked Patch of Dust

== G ==
- Gadsden Purchase
- Galería de la Raza
- Gentefied
- George Lopez (TV series)
- Grammy Award for Best Mexican/Mexican-American Album
- Greaser Act
- Greaser (derogatory)
- Great American Boycott
- Great Wall of Los Angeles
- Gregorio Cortez
- Gringo justice

== H ==
- Hector P. Garcia
- Hernandez v. Texas
- Hijas de Cuauhtémoc
- Hispanos of New Mexico
- History of Mexican Americans
- History of Mexican Americans in Dallas–Fort Worth
- History of Mexican Americans in Houston
- History of Mexican Americans in Los Angeles
- History of Mexican Americans in Metro Detroit
- History of Mexican Americans in Texas
- History of Mexican Americans in Tucson
- Huelga schools (Houston)
- House on Mango Street

== I ==
- I Am Joaquin
- Immigration Reform and Control Act of 1986
- Indigenous Mexican Americans

== J ==
- Josefa Segovia
- Jovita Idar
- Juan Crow
- Julian Castro 2020 presidential campaign
- Justice for Janitors

== K ==
- Killing of Adam Toledo

== L ==
- La Matanza (1910–1920)
- La Prensa
- La Raza
- Las Adelitas de Aztlán
- Las Gorras Blancas
- League of United Latin American Citizens
- League of United Latin American Citizens v. Perry
- Leal Garcia v. Texas
- Lemon Grove Incident
- List of Chicano poets
- List of Chicano rappers
- List of Mexican Americans
- List of Mexican-American communities
- List of Mexican-American political organizations
- List of Mexican-American writers
- List of New Mexico Territory Civil War units
- Little School of the 400
- Living Up the Street
- Los Four
- Los Seis de Boulder
- Los Siete de la Raza
- Lowrider
- Lowrider bicycle

== M ==
- Madrigal v. Quilligan
- Mala Noche
- MANA, A National Latina Organization
- Manifest Destinies: The Making of the Mexican American Race
- March 2006 LAUSD student walkouts
- MEChA
- Medellín v. Texas
- Mendez v. Westminster
- Mexican Americans
- Mexican fiestas in the United States
- Mexicantown, Detroit
- Mexican American bibliography
- Mexican-American cuisine
- Mexican-American Education Council
- Mexican-American folklore
- Mexican American Legal Defense and Educational Fund
- Mexican American Legislative Caucus
- Mexican-American middle class
- Mexican American Odyssey
- Mexican American Political Association
- Mexican American professionals
- Mexican American Studies Department Programs, Tucson Unified School District
- Mexican–American War
- Mexican American Youth Organization
- Mexicans in Omaha, Nebraska
- Mexicans in Chicago
- Mexican muralism
- Mexican Repatriation
- Mexican Texas
- Mexican WhiteBoy
- Missionary Catechists of Divine Providence
- Moment of Silence (poem)
- Mujeres Muralistas
- Murder of Gabriel Fernandez
- Murder of Joe Campos Torres
- Murder of Santos Rodriguez
- Murder of Selena
- Murders of Raul and Brisenia Flores
- Mutualista

== N ==
- Nahui Ollin
- National Association of Chicana and Chicano Studies
- National Mexican-American Anti-Defamation Committee
- National Museum of Mexican Art
- Nepantla
- New Mexican cuisine
- New Mexico music
- New tribalism

== O ==
- Olvera Street
- Operation Wetback

== P ==
- Pachucas
- Pachuco
- PADRES
- Paño
- PCUN
- Pensamiento Serpentino
- Perez v. Brownell
- Perez v. Sharp
- Pilsen Historic District
- Pinto (subculture)
- Plan de Santa Bárbara
- Plan Espiritual de Aztlán
- Plan of San Diego
- Plyler v. Doe
- Political Association of Spanish-Speaking Organizations
- Porvenir massacre (1918)
- Precita Eyes
- Proposition 187
- Punjabi Mexican Americans

== Q ==
- Quinto Sol

== R ==
- Rain God
- Rasquachismo
- Raza Unida Party
- Reconquista (Mexico)
- Revolt of the Cockroach People
- Royal Chicano Air Force

== S ==
- Salt of the Earth
- San Antonio Independent School District v. Rodriguez
- San Elizario Salt War
- Second Ward, Houston
- Self Help Graphics & Art
- Sí se puede
- Shooting of Alex Nieto
- Shooting of Andy Lopez
- Skull art
- Sleepy Lagoon murder
- Society of Mexican American Engineers and Scientists
- So Far from God
- Sonoratown, Los Angeles
- Southern California drywall strike
- Spanglish
- Speedy Gonzales
- Spiritual activism
- SVREP

== T ==
- Teatro Campesino
- Tejano music
- Tex-Mex
- The Moths
- This Bridge Called My Back
- Tortilla art
- Traditionalist Mexican-American Catholic Church
- Treaty of Guadalupe Hidalgo

== U ==
- UCLA Chicano Studies Research Center
- Under the Feet of Jesus
- United Cannery, Agricultural, Packing, and Allied Workers of America
- United Farm Workers
- United States v. Brignoni-Ponce

== V ==
- Vergüenza (social concept)
- Viva Kennedy Campaign

== W ==
- Who Would Have Thought It?

== X ==
- Xicanx

== Y ==
- ...y no se lo tragó la tierra
- Youth control complex

== Z ==
- Zoot suit
- Zoot Suit Riots
