= Laura Gómez =

Laura Gómez may refer to:

- Laura Gómez (actress) (born 1979), American actress
- Laura Gómez (judoka) (born 1984), Spanish Olympic judoka
- Laura Gómez (speed skater) (born 1990), Colombian Olympic speed skater
- Laura E. Gómez (born 1964), University of New Mexico law professor
- Laura Gómez (footballer), Spanish footballer
- Laura I. Gomez, computer scientist
