= Restless Natives (performance) =

Restless Natives (2007) is a traveling performance project composed of dance, music, and original and adapted texts starring Denali Degraf and Malavika Mohanan.

The authors claim to be "in search of the intersection between art, resistance, and daily breath."

In their own words "We tell stories to unearth questions, we explore pain to find unity, and we raise our voices in search of the sacred."

As excerpted from their website:

"Malavika Tara Mohanan, trained in Bharatanatyam (a South Indian classical dance form) and theater, also uses elements of flamenco and other traditions to create a language of movement such that the written word can be embodied while spoken. Texts include several original pieces, as well as writings by Emmanuel Ortiz, Howard Zinn, and Roberto Juarroz. Denali DeGraf plays Native American Flutes and Drums (which he also builds), and the charango, a traditional Andean instrument. The music includes an Aztec song for the dead, a Sanskrit chant for wellbeing, and several original instrumental compositions. The project has a 50-min. scripted performance and opens into a circle for all present to share stories and questions.

The name Restless Natives comes out of questions about what it means to be native to a land, to its people. Questions about borders, boundaries, and rules. The search for a balance between, on the one hand, the depth that develops when staying in one place, and, on the other, the expansion of heart and mind that comes with having connections to more than one geographical region, more than one community. A search that comes from a feeling of something not being right with the world, and a deep awareness that there is another way of being, beyond the limits of time, space, and convention. The splinter in the mind that does not allow the complacency that is silent complicity. Restlessness as the opposite of apathy. We turn the tables on the racist imperialism in the phrase, “the natives are restless,” to say, yes, we are the natives, and we’re restless for change, moving towards home."
