= Moment of silence (disambiguation) =

A moment of silence is a ceremonial event.

Moment of silence may also refer to:

- The Moment of Silence, an adventure video game
- "Moment of Silence" (poem), a poem by Emmanuel Ortiz
- "Moment of Silence" (song), a song by Ovidiu Anton
- The Moment of Silence, an album by Nicholas Teo
