= Vergüenza =

Vergüenza (Spanish for shame) may refer to:

- Vergüenza (TV series), 2017 Spanish TV series
- Vergüenza (social concept), an ethnic-centered construct about the self-shaping of Chicana/o and Latina/o people in the United States, that leads them to fit a traditional-conservative mold
