= African-American middle class =

Social class in the United States

The African-American middle class refers to those within the African-American community who have achieved middle-class status in the U.S. class structure. It is a societal level within the African-American community that primarily began to develop in the early 1960s, when the ongoing civil rights movement led to the outlawing of de jure racial segregation. The African American middle class exists throughout the United States, particularly in the Northeast and in the South, with the largest contiguous majority black middle-class neighborhoods being in the Washington, DC suburbs in Maryland. The African American middle class is also prevalent in the Atlanta, Charlotte, Houston, Memphis, Dallas, Los Angeles, New Orleans, New York, San Antonio, and Chicago areas. The black middle class has experienced significant growth since the 1960s, accompanied by a decrease in the percentage of impoverished blacks. In the early 1960s, approximately 9 to 12 percent of blacks were considered middle class, whereas over half of the black population was categorized as poor. By the conclusion of the 20th century, around one-third of blacks were identified as middle class, with about 25 percent still classified as poor. In comparison, more than two-thirds of whites belong to the middle class, and less than 10 percent are classified as poor. Therefore, although the class structure of African American in the post-civil rights era bears some resemblance to that of whites, it is only a partial reflection, as the white middle class is at least double the size of the black middle class, and the proportion of African American living in poverty is twice that of white people.

== Definition of middle class ==
As of the 2010 census, black households had a median income of $43,510, which placed the median black household within the second income quintile. 27.3% of black households earned an income between $25,000 and $50,000, 33.2% earned between $50,000 and $75,000, 7.6% earned between $75,000 and $100,000, and 9.4% earned more than $100,000.

Although the composition of the Black middle class varies by definition, the Black middle class is typically divided into a lower-middle class, core middle class, and an upper-middle class. The black lower-middle class is concentrated in sales, clerical positions, and blue-collar occupations, while the black upper-middle class (sometimes combined into the black upper class) is characterized by highly educated professionals in white-collar occupations, such as health care professionals, lawyers, educators, engineers, and accountants.

== History ==
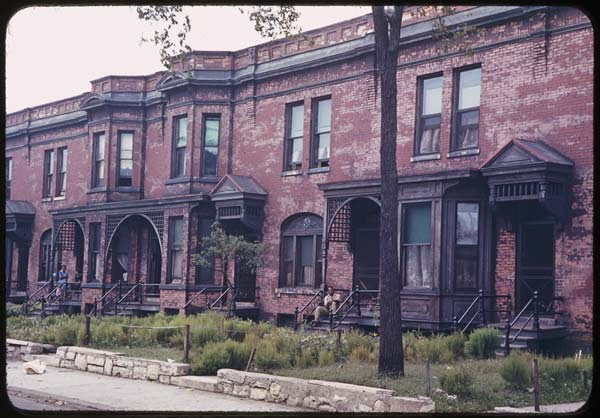
Row houses in a historically black neighborhood of Chicago

Many African-Americans had limited opportunities for advancement to middle class status prior to 1961 because of racial discrimination, segregation, and the fact that most lived in the rural South. In 1960, 43% of the white population completed high school, while only 20% of the black population did the same. African-Americans had little to no access to higher education, and only 3% graduated from college. Those blacks who were professionals were mainly confined to serving the African-American population. Outside of the black community, they often worked in unskilled industrial jobs. Black women who worked were frequently domestic servants. However, black women in the post-slavery emerging middle class also worked as teachers, nurses, businesswomen, journalists and other professionals.

Economic growth, public policy, Black skill development, and the civil rights movement all contributed to the surfacing of a larger black middle class. The civil rights movement helped to remove barriers to higher education. As opportunities for African-Americans expanded, blacks began to take advantage of the new possibilities. Homeownership has been crucial in the rise of the black middle class, including the movement of African-Americans to the suburbs, which has also translated into better educational opportunities. By 1980, over 50% of the African-American population had graduated from high school and eight percent graduated from college. In 2006, 86% of blacks between age 25 and 29 had graduated from high school and 19% had completed a bachelor's degrees. As of 2003, the percentage of black householders is 48%, compared to 43% in 1990.

=== Rise and decline ===
The rise to the middle class for African-Americans occurred throughout the 1960s; however, it leveled off and began to decline in the following decades due to multiple recessions that struck America throughout the 1970s and 1980s. Blacks and other groups suffered the brunt of those recessions. There is also evidence to suggest the wealth gap has been exacerbated by the housing market bubble in 2006 and the recession that followed from late 2007 to mid-2009, which took a far greater toll on depleting minority wealth.

== Racial wealth gap ==
According to a 2011 study from Pew Research Center, whites possess 20 times more wealth than African-Americans and 18 times that of Latinos. Whereas white families have accumulated $113,149 of wealth on average, black households have only accumulated $5,677 in wealth on average. As shown on Eurweb.com, of the 14 million black households in the U.S. in 2015, only 5% had more than $350,000 in net worth, and less than 1% of black families had over $1 million in net assets.

As of 1999, Blacks and whites similarly situated within the "educational middle class" live in distinct wealth worlds. Whereas educationally middle-class whites possessed $111,000 in median net worth, educationally middle-class Black families had only $33,500; in terms of assets, the disparity was $56,000 to $15,000. Looking at only "the occupational middle-class", an equally pronounced gap is visible: middle-class whites had $123,000 in median net worth and $60,000 in median net financial assets compared to $26,500 and $11,200 for middle-class African-Americans. According to Thomas Shapiro (2004), white families possess "between three and five times as much wealth as equally achieving Black middle class families."

A 2016 article entitled "Black Wealth Hardly Exists, Even When You Include NBA, NFL and Rap Stars" related recent findings of the Corporation For Economic Development (CFED) and the Institute for Policy Studies (IPS), which calculated that "it would take 228 years for the average Black family to amass the same level of wealth the average white family holds today in 2016... According to the Institute on Assets and Social Policy, for each dollar of increase in average income an African-American household saw from 1984 to 2009 just $0.69 in additional wealth was generated, compared with the same dollar in increased income creating an additional $5.19 in wealth for a similarly situated white household."

=== Importance of home equity ===
Most contemporary wealth is built in America on home equity. Present-day income is thus an insufficient measure of household socioeconomic status. Looking at disparities between wealth accumulation among African-Americans and whites paints a far more accurate picture of racial socioeconomic differences. The estimated median wealth of black households is $36,000, while white households estimated their parents' median wealth at $150,000. African-Americans, who were historically denied access to housing wealth, face a substantial wealth disparity compared to whites. Asset poverty affects an African-American's ability to procure other forms of middle class lifestyle and other forms of wealth.

== Impact of discrimination ==
=== Housing discrimination ===
A 1936 "residential security" map of Philadelphia, classifying various neighborhoods by estimated risk of mortgage loans

In a project conducted by the University of Washington's Civil Rights and Labor History Program in 2010, it was found that records of more than 400 properties in Seattle suburbs alone contained now-illegal discriminatory language that formerly excluded several ethnic groups.

Another barrier is discriminatory mortgage lending patterns and redlining. Although informal discrimination and segregation had existed in the United States, the specific practice called "redlining" began with the National Housing Act of 1934, which established the Federal Housing Administration (FHA). During the heyday of redlining, the areas most frequently discriminated against were black inner city neighborhoods. For example, in Atlanta in the 1980s, a Pulitzer Prize-winning series of articles by investigative reporter Bill Dedman showed that banks would often lend to lower-income whites but not to middle-income or upper-income blacks. The use of blacklists is a related mechanism also used by redliners to keep track of groups, areas, and people that the discriminating party feels should be denied business or aid or other transactions. In the academic literature, redlining falls under the broader category of credit rationing.

In a 2001 book entitled Housing Discrimination and Residential Segregation as Causes of Poverty, author John Yinger asserted that when applying for a home mortgage, African-American and Hispanic customers are 82% more likely to be turned down for a loan than were white customers. Black renters also favored a 10.7 percent chance of being totally excluded from housing made available to comparable white renters and a 23.3 percent chance of learning about fewer apartments. Discrimination in housing practices and residential segregation leads to substantial wealth gaps across races. Home ownership is typically a source of insurance against poverty. However, for blacks and Hispanics, home ownership rates have never made it past 50% [as of 2001].

=== Residential segregation ===
Segregated housing patterns also keep African-Americans far from suburbanizing jobs and associated job information networks. This mismatch between residential locations and employment reduces the employment options for middle- and lower-class African-Americans.

There is a significant black suburbanization lag in which African-Americans are less likely than others to adopt suburban residential patterns. Black suburbs tend to be areas of low socioeconomic status and population density. Many are former manufacturing suburbs with weak tax bases, poor municipal services, and high levels of debt, compromising the secure middle-class lifestyle of its African-American inhabitants.

== Achievement gap ==
The achievement gap is the measured difference in educational outcomes between cohorts of different races.

=== Structural and institutional explanations ===
There exists a disparity in expenditures on education between inner cities and affluent suburbs almost entirely due to the system of local property taxes which most school systems rely on for funding. By attending less well-funded schools, children of the black middle class do not have access to the same educational opportunities as their white counterparts. In general, minority students are more likely to reside in lower or middle class inner city neighborhoods, so they're more likely to attend poorly funded schools. Schools in lower-income districts tend to employ less qualified teachers and have fewer educational resources. A study by Gordon, Kane & Staiger (2006) shows that teacher effectiveness is an important factor affecting student learning. It speculates that good teachers are sufficient to eliminate the achievement gap.

=== Cultural explanations ===
The culture and environment in which children are raised may play a role in the achievement gap. One explanation that has been suggested for racial and ethnic differences in standardized test performance is that standardized IQ tests and testing procedures are culturally biased toward European-American middle class knowledge and experiences. Social psychologist Claude Steele suggests that minority children and adolescents may also experience stereotype threat—the fear that they will conform to stereotypes about their social group. According to Steele, minority test takers experience anxiety, believing that poor test performance will confirm stereotypes of intellectual inferiority. As a result, the child's performance is diminished. Some researchers also hypothesize that in some cases, minorities—especially African American students—may stop trying in school because they do not want to be accused of "acting white" by their peers. It has also been suggested that some minority students do not make an effort because they do not believe they will ever see benefits come of it in the form of a better job or upward social mobility.

== See also ==
- African-American upper class
- Racial inequality in the United States
- American middle class
- Mexican-American middle class
