= Helena Maria Viramontes =

American novelist

- Viramontes in 2006
- Born: February 26, 1954 (age 72); East Los Angeles, California, U.S.
- Occupations: Novelist; writer; professor
- Known for: Under the Feet of Jesus; Their Dogs Came With Them

Academic background
- Education: Immaculate Heart College; Cal State Los Angeles

Academic work
- Institutions: Cornell University
- Main interests: Chicano literature

Helena Maria Viramontes (born February 26, 1954) is a Chicana (Mexican American) fiction writer and professor of English. She has written short stories and two novels, Under the Feet of Jesus and Their Dogs Came With Them. She is currently a Distinguished Professor of Arts and Sciences in English at Cornell University.

== Childhood and education ==
Viramontes's childhood neighborhood was divided by the East LA Interchange in the early 1960s

Helena Maria Viramontes was born and raised in East Los Angeles, California. Born on February 26, 1954, to Serafin Viramontes, and Maria Louise La Brada Viramontes. She was one of eight siblings in a Catholic family. Viramontes attended public schools.

Viramontes graduated from Garfield High School, one of the high schools that participated in the 1968 Chicano Blowouts. She attended Immaculate Heart College in Los Angeles, where she initially pursued journalism before turning to creative writing from which she earned her Bachelor of Arts in English literature in 1975. She was a first-generation college student. Viramontes taught at Antioch College then moved to California State to complete graduate school. While a grad student in the English department at Cal State L.A.

== Career and literary writing ==
A strong voice in Latino and Chicano literature, her published works include two novels and a collection of short stories.

Viramontes has largely been labeled as "a Chicana writer, as a woman writer, as an ethnic writer,” but she has stated that she has always considered herself an American writer. She was awarded the 1995 Longwood College John Dos Passos Prize for Literature in October 1996.

Viramontes has also written a story entitled Paris Rats in East L.A. (1993) which she later wrote as a screenplay.

=== Novels ===
==== Under the Feet of Jesus ====
Published in 1995, Viramontes's first novel, titled Under the Feet of Jesus, follows Estrella, a thirteen-year-old girl at the crossroads of childhood and womanhood.

==== Their Dogs Came with Them: A Novel (2008) ====
Viramontes's second novel was published in 2008, titled Their Dogs Came with Them. It is set in the 1960s East Los Angeles and follows four Mexican-American women who have grown up in this urban landscape.

This novel caused Julia Alvarez to call Viramontes "one of the important multicultural voices of American literature."

=== Short stories ===
==== The Moths ====
This short story was first published in 1985 in a magazine called XhismArte Magazine, and later published in 1985 in the collection called The Moths and Other Stories.

== Awards and honors ==
- Featured with John Steinbeck and Carlos Bulosan on Oregon Public Broadcasting,"American Passages—A Literary Survey" #12, "The Migrant Struggle"
- Luis Leal Award, Santa Barbara Festival of Books, 2006
