= Alfredo Mirandé =

Mexican American sociologist and attorney

Alfredo Mirandé is a Mexican American sociologist and attorney with a focus on ethnic studies, gender, and law. He is noted for his theory on gringo justice. A Distinguished Professor of Sociology and Ethnic Studies at the University of California, Riverside, he was a National Research Council Fellow, a Rockefeller Fellow, and was inducted into the Illinois State University Hall of Fame. He is most notably credited for inspiring the development of a Chicano sociology that is oriented from a Chicano worldview, rather than from an Anglo worldview of Mexican Americans. This included critiquing the notion that "most of the problems encountered by Chicanos were the result of deficiencies in their own culture and family system."

Mirandé earned his bachelor's degree in social science from Illinois State University, as well as both his master's and Ph.D. in sociology from the University of Nebraska–Lincoln. He then earned his J.D. from Stanford Law School. Mirandé taught at the Texas Tech University School of Law before becoming a distinguished professor at the University of California, Riverside.

His book Behind the Mask: Gender Hybridity in Zapotec Community (2017) was a Lambda Literary Award finalist in LGBTQ studies. The book deconstructs ideas that Mexico is a land of machismo through the figure of the muxe and mayate, the latter of whom is a man who forms a relationship with a muxe. He revealed how in Juchitán de Zaragoza, that muxes are more accepted than mayates because of the stigma attached to their relationship with muxes. He also covered class distinctions between identifying, as gay versus identifying as muxe, with the former being associated with middle- to upper-class areas and the latter being associated with lower-class neighborhoods that have retained a relationship to Zapotec culture rather than aspiring to assimilate into Western culture.

== Personal life ==
He was born in Mexico City and was raised in Chicago.

== Publications ==
- The Age of Crisis (1975)
- La Chicana: The Mexican American Woman, co-authored with Evangelina Enríquez (1979)
- The Chicano Experience: An Alternative Perspective (1985)
- Gringo Justice (1987)
- Hombres y Machos: Masculinity and Latino Culture (1997)
- The Stanford Law Chronicles: ‘Doin’ Time on the Farm’ (2005)
- Rascuache Lawyer: Toward a Theory of Ordinary Litigation (2011)
- Jalos USA: Transnational Community and Identity (2014)
- Behind the Mask: Gender Hybridity in Zapotec Community (2017)
- Gringo Injustice: Insider Perspectives on Police, Gangs, and Law (2020)
- The Chicano Experience: An Alternative Perspective (2022), 2nd edition
