= Victor Rios =

Researcher in influences of inequality

Victor M. Rios is a professor, author, and speaker. His research examines how inequality plays a determining role in the educational and life outcomes of marginalized populations. Rios is of Mexican American origin. He has written several books and is known for developing the theories of the youth control complex, Cultural Misframing, Legitimacy Policing, Masbloom, and Educator Projected Self-Actualization.

== Early life ==
Rios grew up in a single mother household in some of the poorest neighborhoods in Oakland, California where he was surrounded by drugs and gangs. Rios dropped out of school starting in the eighth grade and ended up in Juvenile Hall by the age of fifteen. After multiple negative life experiences he decided to resume his schooling with the help of one of his high school teachers, Flora Russ and various other mentors.

In 1995 Rios began attending California State University, East Bay, with the condition that he take part in a summer program that would teach him basic college academic skills. He graduated from East Bay in 2000 and by 2005, had earned a master's degree and a Ph.D. from University of California, Berkeley.

== Career ==
Rios is currently employed by University of California, Santa Barbara, where he has been an Associate Dean of Social Sciences and is currently MacArthur Foundation Professor of Sociology. He is the winner of various book awards, including the 2013 Oliver Cromwell Cox Award for his book Punished: Policing the Lives of Black and Latino Boys, and is the creator of the sociological theories, "The Youth Control Complex", "Racialized Punitive Social Control", and "Cultural Misframing." In the youth control complex theory Rios argues that the prison and education systems work together to "criminalize, stigmatize, and punish young inner city boys and men." He opposes terms such as "at risk youth", as he feels that the term "at risk" has damaging affects on children. He recommends the term "at-promise" instead.

Based on over a decade of research, Rios created Project GRIT (Generating Resilience to Inspire Transformation), a human development program that works with educators to refine leadership, civic engagement and personal and academic empowerment in young people placed at-risk. This program is featured in The Pushouts a documentary funded by the Corporation for Public Broadcasting.

In June 2015, Rios was invited to the White House for a discussion related to “Exploring Issues and Solutions at the Intersection of Gun Violence, Policing and Mass Incarceration.” He met with the Obama Administration's Domestic Policy Council to give his insight on his research with youth who have experienced gun violence, aggressive policing, and the school-to-prison pipeline. This event was organized by the Joint Center and the Joyce Foundation.

In 2017, Rios was awarded the Public Understanding of Sociology Award by The American Sociological Association. He was one of eight major award recipients from an association of over 13,000 members.

By 2019, Rios and other advocates had convinced school districts and educators across the U.S. to change the way they labeled at-promise young people. In April 2019 the State of California passed a bill, AB 413, changing the label of “at-risk” to “at-promise” in education code, policy, and practice. For years, Rios and other education reformers had advocated for this change. In his 2011 book, Punished: Policing the Lives of Black and Latino Boys, Rios wrote: “At-promise youth are those youth who have traditionally been labeled “at-risk”—youth who have been marginalized, have marginalized themselves, or both. An issue with labeling young people as “risks” is that this may generate the very stigma that I am analyzing in this study. Therefore, I am calling them what many community workers call them: at-promise.”

== Bibliography ==
- Punished: Policing the Lives of Black and Latino Boys (NYU Press, 2011)
- Street Life: Poverty, Gangs, and a Ph.D (Five Rivers Press, 2011)
- Project GRIT: Generating Resilience to Inspire Transformation (Five Rivers Press, 2016)
- Buscando Vida, Encontrando Éxito: La Fuerza de La Cultura Latina en la Educación (Five Rivers Press, 2016)
- Human Targets: Schools, Police, and the Criminalization of Latino Youth (University of Chicago Press, 2017)
- My Teacher Believes in Me!: The Educator's Guide to At-Promise Students (Five Rivers Press, 2019)
- From Risk to Promise: A school leader's guide to professional learning in prosperity-based education (Scholar System, 2021)
- Street Life: Poverty, Gangs, and a Ph.D. Second Edition. (Five Rivers Press, 2024)
