= Their Dogs Came with Them =

2007 novel by Helena Maria Viramontes

Their Dogs Came With Them
- First edition
- Author: Helena Maria Viramontes
- Language: English
- Genre: Novel
- Publisher: Atria Books
- Publication date: 2007
- Publication place: United States

Their Dogs Came With Them is a 2007 novel by Helena Maria Viramontes. Viramontes was born in East Los Angeles, California, into a Mexican American family. She attended Garfield High School and later Immaculate Heart College where she earned her BA in English Literature. During her time in school, Viramontes became deeply influenced by the Chicano Movement. Their Dogs Came With Them is Viramontes most recent work. Seventeen years in production, Their Dogs is acclaimed for its complex characters and personal, gritty writing style. The novel is largely based on Viramontes's childhood in East Los Angeles. The book focuses on the freeway construction and difficult conditions for the Mexican Americans living in this area at the time. It also explores the formation of Chicano youth gangs and their impact on Chicano communities.

== Plot summary ==
Their Dogs Came With Them follows the lives of 4 Mexican American young women living in East Los Angeles during the 1960s. Each character’s story is told in individual chapters while their lives often intermingle. Additionally, her narration style changes from past to present, giving the reader a glimpse into their childhoods to show how their upbringings has an effect on the present. They grow up in an urban landscape, intensified by freeway construction that displaced homes, while the Quarantine Authority uses roadblocks to keep residents in East Los Angeles, “supposedly” protecting them from rabid animals.

Turtle, a girl so desperate to belong, acts like a boy to please her gang member brother, Luis Lil Lizard, who is resentful about having a girl for a sibling. After growing up in an abusive home environment, she too joins the McBride Homeboys and then lives on the streets when her brother goes to fight in Vietnam. Ermila, orphaned after her parents ran away, lives with her grandparents who do not understand the rapidly changing times and the younger generation. Her close group of school friends becomes her family, and together they experience the Chicano power movement as well as serious family and relationship problems. Tranquilina, the daughter of missionaries, is optimistic about religion despite witnessing horrible atrocities, like the cruel and revengeful murder of Ermila’s cousin Nacho, committed by the McBride Boys. And last there is Ana, who devotes herself to mentally ill brother, Ben. As a child he loses his mother, and then he accidentally leads another boy in front of a truck, killing the boy. Witnesses falsely claim that Ben tried to save the boy, and thus Ben leads a life of guilt. Together, these characters, their environments, and their families, emotionally depict the struggles of being low-class section in Los Angeles during the 1960s.

== Reception ==
Their Dogs Came With Them was published in 2007 and has been receiving growing popularity. Kate Soto writes that Viramontes looks to critique colonist abuses, exposing in particular the problems with highway construction. The title and the story work to expose how the Quarantine Authority controlled Latinos in Los Angeles, using their ownership of dogs as an excuse. Representing the power and abuse of government, the story illustrates how the people were mistreated and used. Viramontes writes about a place and a cultural construct that no longer exists in East LA, but only in her memory, which allows her to write fiction as she pleases (Rokitka).

== Social Connections ==
“I do remember a time when there weren’t any freeways, and then I do remember the neighborhood, whole city blocks abandoned, then chewed up, our neighbors disappeared. It devastated, amputated East LA. from the rest of the city. The bulldozers resembled the conqueror’s ships coming to colonize a second time and I felt a real desire to portray the lives of those who disappeared.” Helena Maria Viramontes in an interview with La Bloga.

As evident by the excerpt from Viramontes' interview, her writing is motivated by her love for the people she writes about. She wanted to tell the story of every Mexican American living in East Los Angeles during the political and social upheaval of the 1960s-1970s. The novel uses her own childhood experiences and events such as the Vietnam War, the Chicano Moratorium, poverty and Chicano gangs, and the construction of the freeways as a backdrop to an intricately woven story of four different female protagonists. The freeway construction is an important theme in the novel and to the social climate in East Los Angeles at that time. Having no political voice, Chicano communities could not stop the destruction of neighborhoods, displacement of homes, and the isolation of divided East L.A. which followed the freeway construction. Within the context of the novel, each of the four female protagonists directly experience this isolation and attempt to accommodate for it in their own ways such as joining gangs or returning to religion. Each must find a way to survive in the aftermath and wake of being forgotten in Los Angeles' progress. In addition to these issues, Viramontes also introduces a fictional entity called the Quarantine Authority. Composed of road blocks and police who enforce curfews that effectively "quarantine" the Chicano community from supposed rabid dogs. In effect, the Quarantine Authority become the conquerors of the Chicano neighborhood and the embodiment of the stifling isolation that the characters and communities at large felt from the experience.
