= Mexican-American middle class =

Class of people in the United States

The Mexican American middle class is a sub-population of people of Mexican descent living in the United States who identify with a middle class status.

== History ==
The Mexican-American population in the United States began at the end of the Mexican–American War, when the Treaty of Guadalupe Hidalgo was signed in 1848. This treaty resulted in Mexico relinquishing the present-day states to the United States: New Mexico, Nevada, parts of Arizona, Utah, Texas, and California. With this colonization, it is estimated that fifty thousand Mexicans became U.S. citizens; however, the majority of today’s Mexican Americans trace their ancestral origins to those who migrated after 1848.

As a result, contemporary Mexican Americans may attribute their ancestry to one of the following roots: California's Spanish ranchos, a more recent migration, the children of braceros, or unauthorized migrants who eventually gained legal status under the "baby clause," or IRCA . Despite a social, economic, and political history that is riddled with colonialism and hostility, the Mexican-origin population has made and continues to make triumphs demonstrated through not only their entry into the middle class, but also various advances through social movements such as civil rights and immigration policy.

== Definitions ==
Due to the complex history of Mexicans occupying the United States, it is difficult to comprise one encompassing definition of Mexican American. Generally, a Mexican American is a person who was born in the United States and is of Mexican descent. However, not all people born in the United States and are of Mexican heritage identify as such. Other Mexican heritage identities include: Latino, Chicano, Mexican, and Hispanic.

Latinos/as are a pan-ethnic group in the United States who are steadily growing and who come from different countries in Latin America including Mexico, Honduras, Puerto Rico, Peru, and Brazil. As of July 1, 2015, the Latino/a population of the United States is the nation’s largest racial/ethnic minority group, constituting 17.6 percent of the total population. At two thirds of the Latino/a ethnic category, Mexicans are by far the largest national origin group.

=== Definition of middle class ===
Scholars have varying definitions and classifications for measuring middle class status. Traditionally, middle class status is based on one or more of the following indicators: income, level of education, occupation, home ownership.

== Challenges facing the Mexican-American middle class ==
The Latino middle class is confronted with new political, social, and economic realities and possibilities . Racial discrimination and less favorable job markets make middle class minorities more susceptible to setbacks than their white counterparts . Agius Vallejo states that as Mexican Americans enter white milieus, they “must also manage interethnic relations with whites who do not view them as bona fide members of the white middle class" (Agius Vallejo 2012:666). Social exclusion can occur in the workplace when their white colleagues draw both ethnic and class boundaries . Additionally, Mexican Americans must traverse intraclass relations with their poorer co-ethnics who may request financial or social support. Their unique ties to poverty coupled with their newly advanced social mobility make middle class minorities struggle to find a balance between both class and ethnic contexts.

Not all middle class Mexican Americans come from low-income origins. As Agius Vallejo clarifies: "Some Mexican Americans' backgrounds are steeped in middle-class privilege where they reap the benefits associated with higher parental incomes stemming from their parents' high-paying jobs or successful entrepreneurial endeavors". Likewise, there are Latino/a immigrants who came to the U.S. already occupying middle class status in their home countries. Their previous class wealth and earnings from their country of origin may enable them to transition to middle class status here. However, they may also deal with their own struggles in the form of racial discrimination and accent prejudice, which they may experience more often in the U.S. compared to the previous privilege they held in their home country.

== See also ==
- African-American middle class
- Ranchos of California
- Bracero program
- Immigration Reform and Control Act of 1986
