= Emmanuel Ortiz =

American poet

Emmanuel Ortiz (born 1974) is a Chicano/Puerto Rican/Irish-American activist and spoken-word poet. He has worked with the Minnesota Alliance for the Indigenous Zapatistas (MAIZ) and Estación Libre and as a staff member of the Resource Centre of the Americas. Ortiz has performed his poetry at numerous readings, political rallies, activist conferences, and benefits. His works appeared in The Roots of Terror a reader published by Project South, as well as others. His readings of his poems have appeared on Pacifica Radio’s Democracy Now!. His controversial poem, Moment of Silence, circulated the internet a year after September 11th, 2001.

== Selected works ==
- Moment of Silence (2002)
- The Word is a Machete: Post-Pocho/Puerto Rican Poems of the Personal and Political (2003)
- Under What Bandera? Anti-War Ofrendas from Minnesota y Califas (2004, Editor) Calaca Press ISBN 0-9717035-3-1
- I Wanted to Write an Anti-War Poem, But... (2004)
- Brown unLike Me: Poems From the Second Layer of Our Skin (2009)

== Awards ==
- Bookstore of the Americas Book of the Year Award in 2003 for The Word is a Machete: Post-Pocho/Puerto Rican Poems of the Personal and Political
