= Gringo justice =

Sociohistorical critical theory

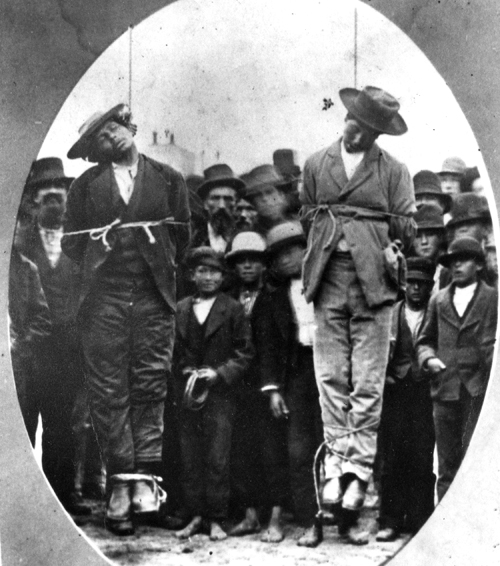
In 1877, Francisco Arias and José Chamales were lynched in Santa Cruz, California. The image was used as the cover for Alfredo Mirandé's book Gringo Injustice (2019)

Gringo justice is a sociohistorical critical theory developed by Chicano sociologist, lawyer, and activist Alfredo Mirandé in 1987, who used it to provide an alternative explanation for Chicano criminality in the United States and challenge the racist assumption that Chicanos were inherently criminal, or biologically, psychologically, or culturally predisposed to engage in criminal behavior. The theory is applied by Chicano and Latino scholars to explain the double standard of justice in the criminal justice system between Anglo-Americans and Chicanos/Latinos. The theory also challenges stereotypes of Chicanos/Latinos as "bandidos," "gang-bangers," and "illegal alien drug smugglers," which have historically developed and are maintained to justify social control over Chicano/Latino people in the United States.

Scholars cite how Latinos are far more likely than Anglo-Americans to be incarcerated, rather than granted probation, when convicted of a felony offense (even when appropriate legal variables are considered), that Latinos are handed down significantly longer prison sentences (particularly in regard to felony drug offenses), and that Latinos are racially profiled at disproportionate rates, as evidence of contemporary gringo justice. Latinos are also overrepresented in the prison population and as victims of police shootings with deadly force. However, scholars note that the topic remains relatively unexplored and neglected, partially attributing this to a lack of interest but also to difficulties in conducting research on Latinos in the criminal justice system because of the way they are racially classified in the US.

Gringo justice is applied against Chicanos and Latinos by the Anglo-American criminal justice system in order to maintain their social, economic, and political domination in modern capitalist society, so that they can remain, as Mirandé states, "a vital source of cheap and dependent labor for the developing capitalistic system." Scholars also note that maintaining gringo justice works to reduce "any threat to conceptions of ethnic superiority that may be held by some whites."

== Term ==
Alfredo Mirandé states that he used the term gringo justice because it would have been illogical in his view to characterize the American criminal justice system as anything other than an unjust system for Chicanos, or a system that only worked for white people. As Mirandé describes:

Titles such as Law, Justice, and the Chicano and Chicanos and the Legal and Judicial System were considered and discarded because they implied that the American legal and judicial system had been just and equitable in its treatment of Chicanos. The title Gringo Justice seemed to more accurately capture the reality of the Chicano experience before the American tribunals.

== Theory ==
In his book Gringo Justice (1987), Mirandé outlines the theoretical underpinnings of gringo justice. He then lists the basic or essential components of gringo justice. These basic principles of the theory are explained by Mirandé as follows:

1. The criminalization of the Chicano resulted not from their being more criminal or violent, but from a clash between conflicting and competing cultures, world views, and economic, political and judicial systems.
2. In the aftermath of the North American invasion and the acquisition of Mexico's northern territories, Chicanos were rendered landless and displaced politically and economically, but they became a vital source of cheap and dependent labor for the developing capitalistic system.
3. Chicanos were labeled as bandidos because they actively resisted Anglo encroachment and domination but lacked the power to shape images of criminality or to articulate sociological/criminological theories. The bandido image served to reinforce or legitimate their economic, political, and legal exploitation.
4. As Chicanos were displaced economically and politically, they became increasingly concentrated in ethnically and residentially homogenous neighborhoods or barrios. Barriorization made it possible to maintain a constant supply of cheap labor without contaminating Anglo society, while keeping Chicanos in a subordinate and dependent position.
5. Conflict with law enforcement intensified during the twentieth century. With growing barriorization the police assumed an increasingly important role in maintaining Chicanos under control and enforcing the social and physical isolation of the barrio.
6. Although Chicanos are essentially a landless people not integrated into the American melting pot, barrios are a symbolic land base and an important source of identity and pride.
7. So-called gangs or barrio youth groups may have negative manifestations, but they are not inherently deviant or criminal, and they provide an essential sense of identity, self-worth, and pride for their members that is afforded other youth by more socially acceptable groupings.

Mirandé also connects gringo justice to the inequitable treatment of Black Americans within the criminal justice system in his book Gringo Injustice (2019), stating that "it is neither possible nor desirable to be indifferent or neutral toward racism or the prevailing unequal system of justice in the United States."

== Application ==
=== Injustice and inequality ===
Gringo justice is used to describe instances in which Chicanos and Latinos experience unjust and unequal treatment within any facet of the United States criminal justice system, both in historical and contemporary contexts. It has been applied by scholars to describe or explain the following instances:

- A 2019 report from the Office of Inspector General for traffic stops, which revealed that "Latinos were both stopped and searched at much greater rates than any other racial or ethnic groups," despite the fact that "there was a very low rate of success in finding contraband."
- A report by the US Bureau of Justice Statistics which revealed that Latinos were overrepresented in traffic stops and arrest rates. Latinos comprise approximately 17.8% of the US population, yet make up 23% of all searches and 30% of all arrests. Some scholars argue that Latino overrepresentation is even more evident when multivariate approaches to data analysis are adopted.
- A California Department of Justice report which estimated that over a ten-year period that about 43% of the victims of police shootings were Latino.
- A study from 1987 to 1991 which found that Latinos are at a "significantly higher likelihood for incarceration, rather than probation, for the conviction of a felony offense even when controlling for relevant legal variables" and that they receive longer prison sentences, "particularly when convicted of felony drug offenses."
- A review by the Department of Justice revealed that Latinos sentenced to prison doubled from 7.7% to 14.3% from 1980 to 1993.

=== Stereotypes ===
A central aspect of the theory of gringo justice is challenging stereotypes of Chicanos and Latinos as inherently criminal, which have been and continue to be perpetuated in Anglo-American society. Scholars acknowledge that an understanding of gringo justice provides an alternative explanation to the criminal stereotypes of Chicanos and Latinos. Some of the stereotypes have been acknowledged as follows:

- Early research conducted on Mexicans generally portrayed them as "innately criminal and prone to thievery and lawlessness," an image which is often associated with non-white racial groups. It has been noted that "the mere presence of Latino immigrants instills fear among longtime residents," even those who claim to be aware of stereotypical portrayals.
- A Texas judge while in court reportedly told a 'joke' which revealed how they perceived Mexicans. The 'joke' stated: "How do you make a Mexican omelet? Well, first you steal three eggs."
- Scholar Steven W. Bender notes that the stereotype of Latino thievery is "by force rather than by stealth" since Latinos are seen as "predisposed toward violent, vicious behavior, so that their crimes may be cold-blooded." Latino youth are also "assumed to be gang members who will eventually graduate from wielding spray-paint canisters to carrying knives and guns."
- Along with Latino youth, even older Latinos are also stereotyped as "suppliers and users of illicit drugs."

== History ==
The historical roots of gringo justice are based in the movement of white Americans from the east coast into the northern territories of Mexico (Alta California, Santa Fe de Nuevo México, and Coahuila y Tejas), who brought with them racist ideas of Anglo superiority and domination. As described by historian Ed A. Muñoz, "not surprising, these Anglo American immigrants in the northern borderlands came to view Mexicans as a subhuman and inferior mongrel race due to their centuries-old African, Indian, and European mestizaje, or racial/ethnic mixing." Mexican land soon became the object of desire for Anglo American settlers under ideas of manifest destiny and the desire to expand slave states westward (slavery was abolished in Mexico in 1829; it was not abolished in the United States until 1865). For Anglo settlers, "Mexican lands were a fountain of resources for a burgeoning U.S. society bent on spreading modern capitalist society around the globe."

In 1836, Anglo immigrants in Texas declared independence from Mexico and Mexican officials refused to recognize this claim as it was an infringement on their sovereignty. This resulted in an open conflict between Anglos and Mexicans, which has roots in the development of the stereotype of the Mexican bandit. As described by Muñoz, "oddly enough it was Mexican resistance to American aggression and illegal colonizing that led to the evolution of the Mexican 'bandido' stereotype. This negative icon portrayed Mexicans as bloodthirsty savages filled with wanton lust for American land and women and worked to justify sustained skirmishes in disputed lands." Texas was annexed in 1845. As a violation of international law, this effectively resulted in the Mexican-American War (1846-1848). Following the war, Mexicans still within the borders of what was now the United States, were transformed from Mexican citizens "into a dependent labor force for southwestern commercial agriculture and industrialization."

Mexicans were stripped of social, economic, and political rights which had been outlined in the Treaty of Guadalupe Hidalgo (1848) and were increasingly portrayed as criminal and subjected to violent policing by groups such as the Texas Rangers. The U.S. government completely erased Article X of the treaty which guaranteed "the validity of land grants distributed by Mexican authorities before the war," which made many Mexicans landless. Anglo vigilante groups, both formal and informal, also attacked Mexicans, who became second-class citizens. Mexicans who resisted this violence like Gregorio Cortez, las Gorras Blancas, and Juan Cortina were labelled as outlaws by Anglos, but became champions among some Mexican American people along the border "because they openly resisted the legal and extralegal takeover of Mexican lands, suppression of Mexican civil rights, and the violation of Mexican families."

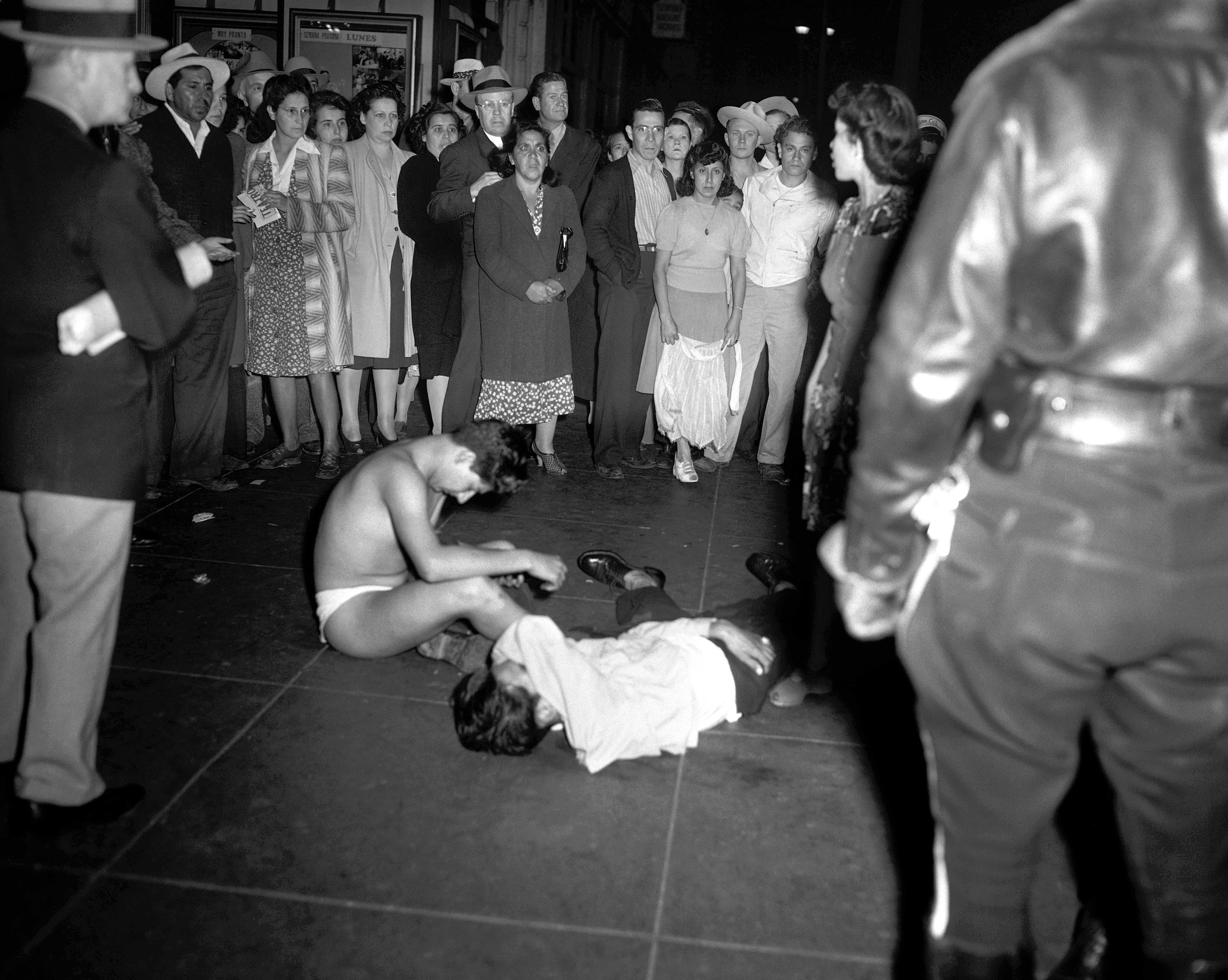
Two Mexican American boys stripped of their zoot suits during the Zoot Suit Riots by U.S. navy sailors.

This resistance, along with further displacement of Mexican revolutionaries from Mexico into the southwestern United States and conflicts with Pancho Villa's revolutionary army, contributed to the rise of "a notion of unpatriotic disloyalty among the U.S. Mexican-origin immigrant and nonimmigrant population." However, the need for Mexican labor soared in the American capitalist system, which led to increasing barrioization or hyper-segregation of Mexicans into areas with poor infrastructure and opportunities by the early 20th century. In these spaces, Mexicans were criminalized at a level unprecedented in Anglo-American communities. Scholars have compared this to Jim Crow laws applied to Black people in the South. During the Great Depression, Mexican labor was suddenly treated as disposable because of the collapse of the American economy, which resulted in the Mexican Repatriation (1929-1936) in which 400,000 to 2 million Mexicans were deported from the United States against their will (it is estimated that about 60% of them were birthright citizens of the United States).

By the 1940s, the pachuco subculture had emerged in open defiance and resistance to this system of gringo justice, embracing a style of dress and social behavior that was widely condemned by Anglo-American society and also by more assimilationist-focused Mexican Americans. Anglo-American hatred for pachuco defiance culminated in the open attacks on Mexican American zoot-suiters by white servicemen in the Zoot Suit Riots. While Mexicans were largely the victims of the attacks, they were arrested by the police while servicemen went free. Some police officers reportedly joined in on the rioting and attacks. The local press praised the attackers and described the riots as a "cleansing effect" to free Los Angeles of Mexican "miscreants" and "hoodlums." Over 500 Latinos were arrested and charged with "rioting" and "vagrancy." The zoot suit garment itself was also criminalized in the city, as the city council stated it represented "hoodlumism."

== See also ==
- La Matanza (1910-1920)
- Lynching of Hispanic and Latino Americans
