= Bracero Monument =

Monument in Los Angeles, California, U.S.

- The monument in 2022
- Artist: Dan Medina
- Location: Los Angeles, California, U.S.
- 34°3′29.8″N 118°14′24.2″W

The Bracero Monument (Spanish: Monumento Bracero) is a bronze statue located on César Chávez Avenue, in Los Angeles, California, honoring the participants of the Bracero program. The Bracero program was an initiative that operated from 1942 to 1964 which brough Mexican workers to work in the United States, initially owing to the American labor shortage due to World War II.

== History ==
The monument was sculpted by artist Dan Medina, and erected in 2019 in Migrant's Bend Plaza, along César Chávez Avenue, near the El Pueblo de Los Ángeles Historical Monument and Calle Olvera. The 19-foot-tall monument features a bronze sculpture of a Mexican bracero and alongside his wife and son.

The monument was initially proposed by Baldemar Capiz and later erected with the support of the Unión Binacional de Exbraceros (Spanish for "Binational Union of Ex-Braceros") and of Los Angeles City Councilmember José Huizar.
