= Laura I. Gomez =

Computer scientist

Laura I. Gómez is a computer scientist known for establishing Atipica, a company that presents bias free names in recruiting.

== Early life and education ==
Gómez was born in León Guanajuato, México and then moved to California when she was eight years old. Gomez got her first software engineering internship at the age of seventeen, when she got an internship working at Hewlett-Packard after she received a work permit. For college, she earned a Bachelor of Human Development and Family Studies from University of California Berkeley and a Master of Latin American Studies from University of California San Diego.

== Career ==
Gomez worked with several start-ups and big technology companies, include

YouTube, Google, and Twitter.[5][6] She was one of the early employees at Twitter,[7] and her work there centered on bringing Spanish into the user interface.[8] Gomez has also discussed the use of social media as a means to practice as people learn a new language.[9]

Gomez was a founding member of a project known as Project Include, a non-profit led by Ellen Pao that advocates for inclusion in the technology field. Project Interlude funded Gomez's start-up, Atipica, an organization which provides artificial and human intelligence to sort job candidates in a manner that reduces bias. Over time, Atipica was backed by Kapor Capital, Precursor Ventures, and True Ventures. One of the perks provided by Atipica is paid time off for employees supporting a political cause. The funding Gomez raised for Atipica was the largest financing level for a Latinx founder in Silicon Valley. As of 2023, Gomez was working on Proyecto Solace, a mental health initiative for Latinx peoples.

== Awards and honors ==
Gomez was recognized by the Department of State and Former Secretary of State, Hillary Clinton, for her work in the TechWomen Program.
