= Estación Libre =

Estación Libre is an activist group founded in 1997, which works in solidarity with the EZLN in San Cristobal de las Casas, Chiapas, Mexico. It was founded specifically to strengthen "the connections between communities of color (in the U.S.) with each other and the Zapatista movement."

Since, according to Estación Libre, "the international solidarity movement [that works with the EZLN] is white dominated", the group works to link activists and communities of color from the [United States] with the indigenous population of Chiapas, Mexico.

One of the organization's projects consists of sending "people-of-color work brigade[s] from the United States" to Chiapas to work in Zapatista communities and build links for future solidarity work.
