= Laura E. Gómez =

Mexican American legal scholar

- Born: Roswell, New Mexico, U.S.
- Education: Harvard University (BA, MA); Stanford Law School (JD); Stanford University (PhD)
- Employer: UCLA
- Website: lauraegomez.com

Laura E. Gómez is a professor at the School of Law at the University of California, Los Angeles where she also holds appointments in Sociology and the Department of Chicana & Chicano Studies and Central American Studies.

== Education and career ==
Gómez received her B.A. in social studies from Harvard University in 1986 where she was a Harry S. Truman Scholar. She received her M.A. in sociology from Stanford University in 1988. She later received her J.D. with honors from Stanford Law School in 1992 and her Ph.D. in sociology from Stanford University in 1994.

Following law school, Gómez clerked on the Ninth Circuit Court of Appeals for Judge Dorothy W. Nelson. Before going to Stanford, she worked as a legislative aide to U.S. Senator Jeff Bingaman.

At UCLA, Gómez co-founded and served as the first co-director (with Jerry Kang) of UCLA's Critical Race Studies Program from 2000-2002. The program is the first specialized program of study on race and law in any U.S. law school.

Gómez was a Professor in School of Law & American Studies at the University of New Mexico from 2005 to 2011.

Gómez is active in several national scholarly organizations, including the Law and Society Association (where she has served as Treasurer and on the Board of Trustees), the American Sociological Association's Sociology of Law Section, the Association of American Law Schools Minority Section, the Critical race theory Workshops, and LatCrit. Gómez has also served as an Associate Editor of the Law & Society Review. Gómez has been a peer reviewer for several other journals in legal studies, gender studies, Chicano/a studies, legal history and sociology, and she has been a member of the editorial boards of SIGNS and Studies in Law, Politics and Society. Gómez has held prestigious residential fellowships at the School for American Research in Santa Fe and the Stanford Humanities Center, where in 1996-97 she was the last Rockefeller Fellow in Legal Humanities.

Gómez as the former Dean of Social Sciences has faced the accusation in the media of discriminating in hiring practices against conservatives. She opted not to promote Keith A. Fink to Continuing Lecturer, effectively ending his employment with the Department of Communication Studies on June 30, 2017.

== Publications ==
Gómez is the author of Manifest Destinies: The Making of the Mexican American Race (2007) and Inventing Latinos: A New Story of American Racism (2020).
