= Bracero Selection Process =

Bracero workers were selected through a multi-phase process, which required passing a series of selection procedures at Mexican and U.S. processing centers. The selection of bracero workers was a key aspect of the bracero program between the United States and Mexico, which began in 1942 and formally concluded in 1964. During this time, at least 4.6 million bracero workers entered into official labor agreements with U.S. contractors.

== Stages of selection ==
=== Local selection ===
When the program began, Mexico’s economy had just begun recovering from the Mexican Revolution, a fact that encouraged President Manuel Camacho to promote the Bracero Program due to its economic benefits. The Mexican government recruited heavily from the northwestern region of the country due to the prevalence of underemployed Mexican men experienced in harvesting crops in this region, and for the region's proximity to transportation systems in the U.S. The first phase of selection for bracero workers took place at a local level in Mexico, which involved gathering required documentation for local officials. In addition to identifying documents, such as birth certificates, potential bracero workers had to obtain recommendations that would attest to their reliability and moral quality. Men would typically ask for recommendations from high-status local residents, such a politicians, clergy, or business owners. While the Mexican government's publications asserted that required documentation was available free of charge, many aspiring workers had to pay local officials to gather the necessary paperwork and to be considered for selection. This is particularly true as more men sought contracts, a growing number of officials began to charge for legal and fake documents; these practices would come to permeate all levels of the program. Moreover, a late investigation in the 1950s revealed that almost eight percent of the program participants had paid for a contract.

After several weeks of document collection, potential workers would congregate in a designated location, where the mayor and other prominent citizens would go through each man's documentation and determine who could continue to the next phase of selection. If a person passed this local level of selection, their name would be placed on an official roster. These potential workers, along with the list, would travel to regional migratory stations.

=== Regional migratory stations in Mexico ===
People who sought to enter the bracero program would travel to large cities in Mexico, where regional migratory stations comprised the second phase of selection. These processing centers were typically housed in stadiums or other large venues. Hundreds, sometimes thousands, of men would wait outside to hear their name called, sometimes for extended periods of time. The periods of unemployment that these braceros experienced between labor contracts, or as they waited outside the Mexican contracting centers, often led the bracero’s family into increased poverty. Those at home reported that the wait for news was painful, and some women suspected that their husbands were squandering their earnings instead of sending remittances back to them. Officials monitored the people waiting outdoors, and some carried weapons, such as a rubber truncheon. Local vendors, many of them women and children, sold concessions outside the processing centers, men would typical go broke during their waits.

After a man heard his name called, he would enter the migratory station. In some stations, such as the Francisco Zarco Stadium in Durango City, a potential worker would walk through lines of armed soldiers on both sides when he entered. Then the applicant would proceed to an interview with local officials. Officials checked to see if the person had agricultural skills and would look at a potential laborer's hands to see if they were callused, as a sign of their work in fields. Mexican women would type up information on bracero applicants at many migratory stations.

Potential braceros would undergo physical examinations, where officials would assess physical fitness and ability. At some migratory stations, prospective braceros would receive a medical evaluation including a smallpox vaccination, while others would receive their vaccination later on at a U.S. Reception Center. If a person passed this phase, they would be fingerprinted and sent to the Department of Photography. Pictures would be taken for processing records and for an applicant's crucial identification card, called a mica. A mica offered documentation that the Mexican government had approved an individual for the program.

=== U.S. reception centers ===
Potential workers traveled from migratory stations to U.S. reception centers roughly twenty miles south of the U.S.-Mexico border. The method of transportation varied, some people went to migratory stations on buses, while others traveled on freight trains. On the trains that did not have restrooms, some aspiring workers fell off moving trains when they leaned out to go to the bathroom.

Upon arrival at a U.S. reception center, officials from both U.S. and Mexican health departments would check the hands of potential braceros for calluses, repeating a procedure from the selection phase at migratory centers. People would proceed to a series of physical inspections, in which they would undress, and a doctor would examine them for venereal diseases such as syphilis, illness including mental and physical disabilities, and lice. Potential workers would also be x-rayed to test for tuberculosis. Officials washed and sterilized clothing. Another procedure at U.S. reception centers was fumigation: potential braceros, while undressed, would be fumigated with DDT, an insecticide which was banned in the early 1970s due to environmental and health concerns, including carcinogenic and reproductive risks.

Another phase of selection was inspection by U.S. labor contractors. At U.S. reception centers, potential workers would typically line up and contractors would physically examine and question them. Some contractors reported that they looked for workers that would be deferential rather than subversive. Aspiring braceros would also receive a meal at the U.S. reception centers, where they sat at long tables in dining halls. Afterward men were photographed and assigned a number, and then directed to meet with contractors, who would outline the terms of the labor contract. Workers would receive a second mica, which offered proof that the U.S. government had approved an individual to be part of the bracero labor program.

When workers left the U.S. reception centers, many men would receive a bagged lunch and travel to farms on buses, which were usually old school buses. Some lunches were left behind and were described as virtually inedible. One New York Times article reported on a contractor giving bracero workers dog food.

The Mexican men that did not pass the selection process at U.S. reception centers were sent back to Mexico. Many of them had exhausted their financial resources acquiring the necessary documents to become a bracero worker, so numerous people returned home with little to no money.

== In popular culture ==
The Visalia Opera Company, from a rural area in California, premiered a mariachi opera titled El Bracero in 2014. The opera traces the story of a bracero worker, Noe Prado, and his family and includes a scene on bracero processing. This portion of the opera emphasizes the experience of pesticide showers while being naked. Rosalinda Verde created the opera, infusing knowledge from her grandfather's experience as a bracero worker.
