= Youth control complex =

Criminology theory

The youth control complex is a theory developed by Chicano scholar Victor M. Rios to describe what he refers to as the overwhelming system of criminalization that is shaped by the systematic punishment that is applied by institutions of social control against boys of color in the United States. Rios articulates that there are many components of this complex which are enacted upon youth throughout their daily lives. For example, "while being called a 'thug' by a random adult may seem trivial to some people, when a young person is called a 'thug' by a random adult, told by a teacher that they will never amount to anything, and frisked by a police officer, all in the same day, this combination becomes greater than the sum of its parts." Scholars trace the origins of the youth control complex back to the mid-1970s. In addition, the criminalization and surveillance of Black and Latino bodies increased in the post-9/11 era.

Rios notes that the youth control complex affects how youth perceive their futures and has deep negative psychological consequences for the mental health of Black and Latino boys while also normalizing harmful practices, such as transforming schools into prison-like institutions and proliferating child abuse. The youth control complex involves both symbolic and material criminalization and its impact on Black and Latino youth is described as intentional to funnel them into the school-to-prison pipeline, rather than benign. Rios himself experienced contact with this system of criminalization growing up in Oakland, California and drew on his personal experience as well as interviews with other youths of color in developing the theory. Rios also envisions a "youth support complex" as a potential solution to the youth control complex. This new model would shift decision-making power from school administrators and law enforcement to students themselves.

== History ==
According to scholar Henry A. Giroux, the origins of the youth control complex in America begin with the shift to a neoliberal state in the mid-1970s. Through the war on poverty, which manifested as a war on crime, law enforcement began targeting Black and brown bodies in the 1980s. In the mid-1990s, the rise in high-profile school shootings ushered more law enforcement into schools as school resource officers. Finally, the Bush administration's post-9/11 war on terror led to the creation of a racialized warfare state that relied heavily on the surveillance and criminalization of children of color. All these historical events contributed to the creation of the school-to-prison pipeline in American public schools. Scholars like Victor M. Rios and Paul Hirschfield have also proposed solutions to the school-to-prison pipeline, such as the youth support complex and restorative justice.

== Enactment ==
The youth control complex is enacted upon boys of color through a host of institutions, including "schools, families, businesses, residents, mass media, community centers, and the criminal justice system," before they ever commit a potential criminal offense. This system of social control exerts harsh punishments whenever youth fail to follow directions, exerting a zero-tolerance approach from a very young age. As Rios states, "these young people experienced a kind of social death; they were outcasts before they even committed their first offense. This kind of targeting creates a system that metes out brutal symbolic and physical force on young people." The complex is enacted within a racist culture that Rios describes as "obsessed with control."

Within this complex, young people lose themselves because of the violent way in which they are treated. Those in power criminalize their everyday behaviors, such as style of dress, and treat them as deviant. Rios compares the inside experience of the youth control complex to that of a pinball in of a pinball machine. Additionally, Rios notes that the intentions of this complex are ultimately enacted in order to trap youth of color through management, control, and incapacitation, all of which direct them towards incarceration, recidivism, subjugation, exploitation, and death.

Legal scholar Kate Weisburd applies the youth control complex in an analysis of youth electronic monitoring. Weisburd states that electronic monitoring is being enacted by authority figures as a substitute to youth incarceration, who claim that it "effectively rehabilitates," "lowers incarceration rates," and is "cost-effective." However, she finds that there is no empirical evidence to support these claims. Instead, Weisburd determines that electronic monitoring is likely more harmful because it institutes a constant and demanding system of mass surveillance. Monitors must be constantly serviced by youth detainees at all times with the constant threat of incarceration and punishment looming. Weisburd describes how some youth are expected to charge the device daily, remain in their homes unless attending school (otherwise activity would have to be approved 48 hours in advance), and call the electronic monitoring office 3 times per day. Any minor violations result in youth being taken into custody, separated again from their homes and families. This process of separation may occur repeatedly and has intense psychological implications on youth.

In educational institutions, scholar Henry A. Giroux states that Columbine (1999) contributed to the developed of policies and practices of social control in schools: "Rather than giving rise to a concern for young people, Columbine helped to put into place the development of a youth control complex in which crime has become the fundamental axis through which children's lives are both defined and monitored while the militarization of schools became the order of the day." Giroux states that this heightened practices of treating students like prisoners, and school like prison, especially for youth of color, "who are too often considered as utterly disposable."

== Statistical evidence ==
There are numerous statistics which illuminate the presence of the youth control complex:

- 95% of all juveniles sent to adult courts (tried as adults) are youth of color.
- In California, youth of color are 2.5 times more likely than white kids to be tried as adults and 8.3 times more likely to be incarcerated by adult courts.
- In Florida, pretrial juvenile detention has been found to have significantly harsher negative effects on downstream case outcomes (such as dismissal, conviction, and sentencing) for Black youth than for their White and Latino counterparts.
- In 2003, 12% of all Black men in their twenties were incarcerated, and almost 4% of Latino men.
- A Black male born in 2001 has a 1 in 3 chance of being incarcerated; a Latino male has a 1 in 6 chance.
- In states such as California, where the Latino population is much higher, Latino youth make up 60% of the state's juvenile detainees and 36% of the state youth prison population.
- In California, Black youth make up only 7.8% of the state population, yet comprise approximately 30% of the state's juvenile detainees.

== Effects ==
Scholars describe how effects of the youth control complex often result in long-term consequences for boys of color. Some psychological implications include the development of extreme anxiety disorders, post-traumatic stress disorder, depression, and different forms of behavioral disorders that are viewed as disruptive. Alex S. Vitale mentions that the complex also "undermines their life chances by driving them into economic and social failure and long-term criminality and incarceration."

As this complex is enacted, Rios notes that youth of color begin to internalize their own criminalization because "they are already seen as suspects by many in the community." As a result, they develop "identities that they often wish they could renounce" and in some cases end up embracing the criminality they are already expected to commit.

For Rios, the youth control complex reveals that there is a "crisis of 'governance'," or a failure on the part of institutions which claim to be for the people, but actually use criminalization to govern and control them. When enacting this system of social control, Rios states that the government becomes "an abusive step-parent figure, beating its children and throwing them in a room with no windows nor doors," normalizing and justifying child abuse in the process.

== Solutions ==
Victor M. Rios proposes a "youth support complex" as the solution to the youth control complex. He calls on lawmakers, law enforcement, educators, and community members to create a system that empowers young people to rectify their mistakes and engage in building their own futures. Rios also calls for the end of zero-tolerance policies in schools that mandate strict, sweeping punishments for designated behaviors regardless of context. Other scholars advocate for the implementation of restorative justice in schools. Restorative justice focuses on conflict resolution rather than punishment. In addition to in-school arrests, restorative justice provides an alternative to suspensions and expulsions, which isolate students from the school community and often lead to out-of-school arrests. Peacemaking and conferencing practices give legitimacy to school authorities while also elevating the voices of youth.

State legislators have also made efforts to end the school-to-prison pipeline. For example, Virginia Senate Bill 3, which was passed in the Virginia General Assembly in July of 202, prohibits law enforcement from charging students with disorderly conduct during the school day or at school events. Also part of the package was SB 729, which abolished a law that required school principles to refer student misbehavior to local law enforcement. Senator Jennifer McClellan, who sponsored the bill, is also concerned with equipping school officials and law enforcement with proper information about adolescent psychology. She said in an interview to AP News, "Everyone in the school building that interacts with kids, but especially school resource officers and school board members who ultimately make decisions about the code of conduct and discipline, need to have basic training on child brain development."

Local officials are also making changes at the school board level. For example, in October 2020, the Richmond school board in Richmond, Virginia approved a plan to appoint a committee charged with overseeing school resource officers, as in-school juvenile arrests began skyrocketing in the district. During the 2018-2019 and 2019-2020 school years, there were 400 arrests in Richmond Public Schools. The proposal passed after a plan to ban police officers from schools failed in a 5-to-4 vote.
