= Under the Feet of Jesus =

1995 book by Helena Maria Viramontes

- First edition
- Author: Helena Maria Viramontes
- Language: English
- Genre: Fiction
- Published: 1995
- Publisher: Plume
- Publication place: United States
- ISBN: 9780452273870

Under the Feet of Jesus is a 1995 book by Helena Maria Viramontes and her first published novel. It was released in the United States by Plume and follows the lives of a Mexican-American migrant family working in the California grape fields.

== Plot ==
The book follows Estrella and her family as they arrive in Central Valley and must deal with several challenges. The family works in the grape fields, where they are paid very little for what is grueling labor. Estrella soon meets Alejo and the pair fall in love. Tragedy strikes when Alejo is sprayed with pesticide and falls gravely ill. Estrella's mother, Petra, also discovers that she is pregnant, which complicates matters. As Alejo grows increasingly more ill, Estrella and her family take Alejo to see a nurse at the nearest clinic, who charges them $10 for an office visit, in which the nurse only confirms to them that Alejo is sick. Unable to pay the fee completely, Petra's companion Perfecto offers to fix the clinic's plumbing in lieu of payment, but she declines. The nurse tells the family to take Alejo to the hospital, which is 20 miles away. As the nurse has what little money they had, a desperate Estrella smashes the desk at the clinic with a crowbar until the nurse returns the money, which they use on gas to reach the hospital. Once at the hospital, Estrella and her family must leave Alejo there alone, out of fear of law enforcement searching for them due to the clinic visit, since they knew that the hospital couldn't refuse him aid. Alejo is taken into the hospital, where there is a risk that she may never see him again. Petra, looking under the feet of a Jesus statue, sees the birth certificates of her five children, and the marriage certificate from when she married her husband in Santa Ana. She views these documents as proof against immigration if anyone tries to wrongly deport her children. Petra is contemplative about her life, her struggles, her daughter's affection for someone like her first husband, and the growing life in her belly. Perfecto, too, worries about how he can afford to bring another life into the world when they are struggling to survive. He feels old, too tired to be starting another family, and homesick for the home of his youth.

Estrella gets up in the night, puts on her overalls, and goes alone to the barn mentioned several times in the book. She climbs a chain to the roof and there finds new strength and a conviction that her heart is powerful enough to "summon home all those who strayed."

== Characters ==
- Petra – Mother and leader of the family.
- Estrella – Estrella, sometimes referred to as Star, a nickname given to her by her father, is the thirteen-year-old daughter of Petra, and eldest of children. She often helps her mother take care of her younger siblings.
- Alejo – Fifteen-year old cousin to Gumecindo. He lives and works with his cousin after his mother dies. His grandma lives in Edinburg, Texas and he sends money back to help her. He works in the same grape fields as Estrella and the two meet and fall in love.
- Perfecto Flores – Petra's companion after her first husband walks out on the family, leaving her alone with young children to raise.
- Twin girls Perla and Cookie - Perla and Cookie are the young twin girls of the family.
- Ricky - Younger brother of Estrella.
- Arnulfo - Estrella's other younger brother.
- Gumecindo - The only family member Alejo has in California. Both Gumicindo and Alejo work in the grape fields.
- Maxine Devridge - Blond haired and blue-eyed, Maxine is Estrella's childhood friend back home before the family moves.

== Themes ==
According to scholars such as Sharla Hutchison, the book comments on many themes and elements such as Chicano culture and bilingualism, migrant working conditions, and American mainstream culture and consumerism. Jeehyun Lim noted in a 2010 article for Women's Studies Quarterly that Viramontes's combined use of English and Spanish could be seen as a possible form of conflicted identity for the character of Estrella, who is also at the cusp of womanhood and deciding how she will live her life in the future. Writing for Interdisciplinary Studies in Literature and Environment, C. Grewe-Volpp writes on the topic of migrant working conditions and environmental injustice seen in the book, citing the character Alejo's story of the La Brea Tar Pits, in which he tells Estrella they found human bones under the ground as well as his exposure to sprayed fertilizer. In an article for The Journal of Popular Culture, Sharla Hutchison notes the commentary on consumerism through the products used by the family, as Estrella learns how to read from household brand products advertisements and the character's own commentary on the artwork featured on a box of Sun-Maid raisins, as Estrella opines that the mascot will never know the pain and exploitation of the migrant labor needed to gather grapes.

== Reception ==
Under the Feet of Jesus has received reviews from outlets such as The Radical Teacher, Chasqui, and Los Angeles Times, the latter of which compared Viramontes to John Steinbeck and wrote that "Viramontes' prose is thick and lush, like the grape fields where migrant workers labor under the hot sun. There is passion here, but the author avoids easy sentimentality."

=== Awards ===
- Helena Maria Viramontes was awarded the John Dos Passos Prize for literature in 1995.
- This book was a finalist for the Barnes and Noble Discover Great New Writers Award.
