= Center for Mexican American Studies at Arlington =

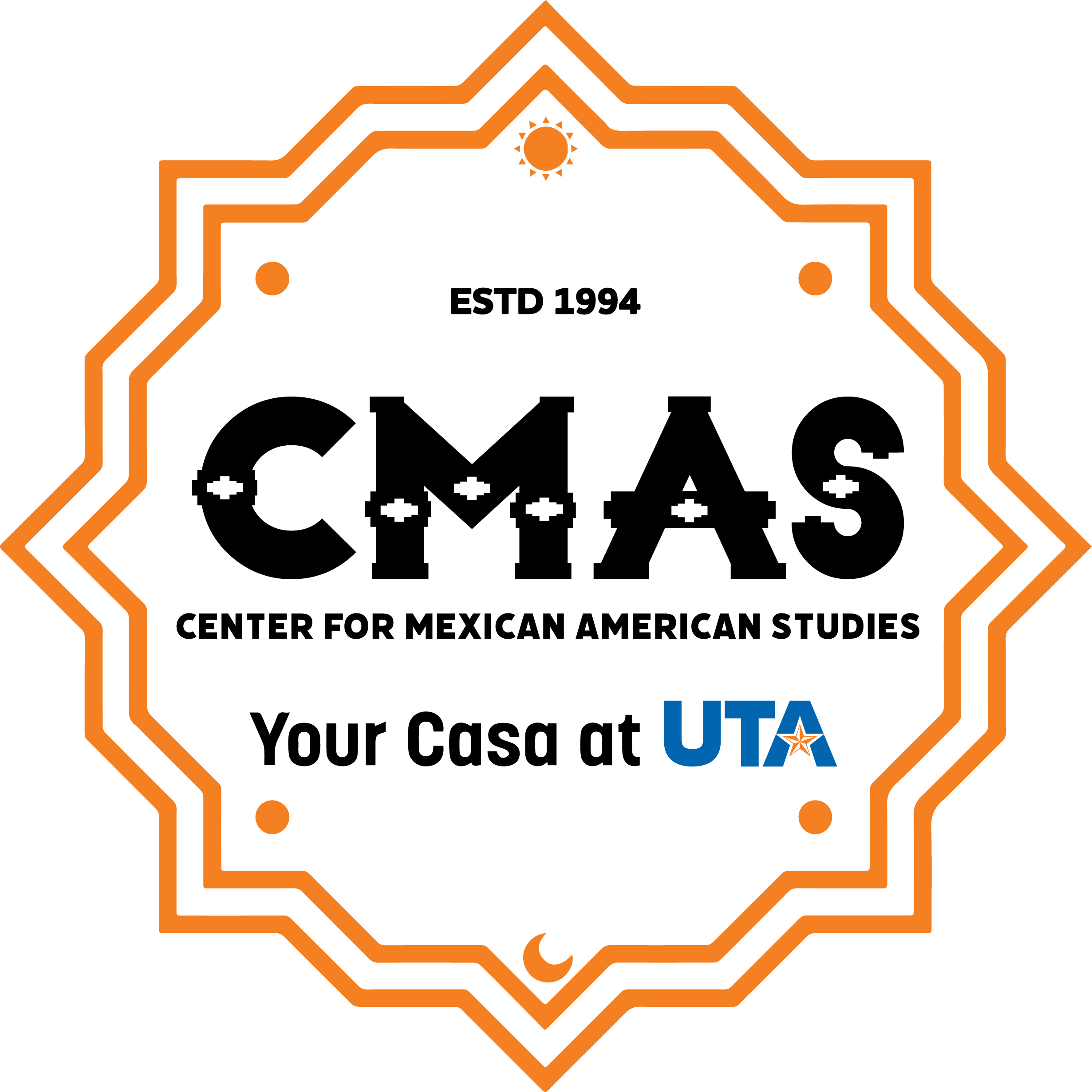
Center for Mexican American Studies at The University of Texas at Arlington

The Center for Mexican American Studies at The University of Texas at Arlington is an academic research center that promotes research and the recruitment, retention, and professional development of UTA faculty actively engaged in studies on Latino issues.

The Center administers an 18-hour academic minor in Mexican American Studies and its annual Distinguished Speaker Series. Additionally, it provides service outreach activities to the Latino community in the Dallas/Fort Worth Metroplex.

== History ==
Through the efforts of State Representative Roberto Alonzo of Dallas, the 73rd Texas Legislature authorized the creation of CMAS-UTA in 1993.

On October 12, 1994, the Center held its grand opening under founding director Dr. José Ángel Gutiérrez, a member of UTA's Department of Political Science. Dr. Gutiérrez's directorship ended in 1996.

In 1997, the university named Consulting Director Dr. Neil Foley of the University of Texas, Austin to reconstitute and reactivate the center, and to search for a new director. Those efforts led to the appointment of Dr. L. Manuel García y Griego as CMAS director in Fall 1999. Dr. García y Griego relinquished leadership of the center in 2003.

In 2003, Interim Director Dr. Alejandro Del Carmen of UTA's Department of Criminology and Criminal Justice was appointed until 2005. In 2005, Dr. Susan González Baker became the next CMAS director until 2013. In 2013, Dr. Christian Zlolniski, a member of UTA's Department of Sociology and Anthropology, was appointed CMAS director with Dr. William Arce from UTA's Department of English joining in as assistant director. In 2015, Dr. Ignacio Ruiz-Perez from the Department of Modern Languages is appointed as the new Assistant Director.

After the departure of Director Zlolniski, Dr. Xavier Medina Vidal, an Associate Professor of the Department of Political Science, took the helm in Fall 2022 as the acting CMAS director.

== MAS Minor ==
The minor in Mexican American Studies is an interdisciplinary program that offers a strong complement for students majoring in Liberal Arts, Education, Business, Social Work, and Nursing. The MAS minor enables the student to explore the Mexican American and Latino experience.

== Distinguished Speaker Series ==
The Distinguished Speaker Series is the annual lineup of speakers who are notable figures within the area of Mexican American Studies. Notable guest speakers have included Dr. Jorge Casteñeda the former Foreign Minister of Mexico, Maria Hinojosa, NPR Journalist, Pia Orrenius, Vice President & Senior Economist at the Federal Reserve Bank of Dallas, Leo Chavez, anthropology professor at the University of California, Irvine, and Dr. Neil Foley of the University of Texas.
