= Society of Mexican American Engineers and Scientists =

MAES: Latinos in Science and Engineering, Inc. (MAES), originally the Mexican American Engineering Society, was founded in 1974. It organizes an annual symposium and career fair.

== History ==
MAES was founded in Los Angeles in 1974 to increase the number of Mexican Americans and other Hispanics in the technical and scientific fields.

The idea to establish a professional society for Mexican American engineers originated with Robert Von Hatten, an aerospace electronics engineer with TRW Defense Space Systems in Redondo Beach, California. Mr. Von Hatten had for several years served as volunteer for programs directed at combating the alarming number of high school dropouts. He envisioned a national organization that would serve as a source for role models, address the needs of its members, and become a resource for industry and students.

In mid–1974, Mr. Von Hatten contacted Manuel Castro to join him in the campaign to form the professional organization. During a subsequent series of meetings, a cohort of individuals banded together to lay out the foundation for the “Mexican American Engineering Society.” The founders, listed below, drafted the articles of incorporation and the first bylaws of the society:

- Oscar Buttner – Rockwell International
- Sam Buttner – Southern California Edison
- Manuel Castro – Bechtel Power
- Clifford Maldonado – Northrop Corporation
- Sam Mendoza – California State University, Fullerton
- Frank Serna – Northrop Corporation
- Robert Von Hatten – TRW Defense Space Systems

The society filed incorporation papers as a nonprofit, tax exempt organization with the California Secretary of State in October 1974, and it received its charter on March 28, 1975. The Internal Revenue Service granted the society a federal tax–exemption letter and employer identification number on January 4, 1979. Ten years later, to reflect its broader technical membership, the organization filed to change its name to the “Society of Mexican American Engineers and Scientists, Inc.” This change was granted on July 19, 1989.

MAES is one of several membership–based organizations that represent Latinos in engineering and science. As a mature organization with over 30 years of experience addressing the concerns of Latinos, MAES is a source of expertise on barriers to and methods for improving educational access and attainment. The society recognizes the importance of encouraging more youth to pursue careers in science, technology, engineering, and mathematics as a means for economic advancement and workforce development.

Many of its programs, with the financial help of members, companies, and government agencies are directed at increasing the number of students at all grade levels who will study, prepare, enter, and excel in the technical professions.
