= National Mexican-American Anti-Defamation Committee =

The National Mexican-American Anti-Defamation Committee (N.M.A.A.D.C) is the major advocacy group for Mexican-Americans and DACA recipients in the United States. Mostly active between 1968 and 1971. The group has undergone development and is actively working in support of victims of allegedly unlawful I.C.E raids and alleged uncivil deportation.

== History ==
Founded as a lobbying group in Washington, D.C, the NMAADC along with San Antonio group I.M.A.G.E pushed Frito-Lay to get rid of the Frito Bandito mascot created by the Foote, Cone & Belding Communications, and animated by Tex Avery. The character was voiced by Mel Blanc, who used a Mexican accent not unlike another character of his, Speedy Gonzales.

Its former head, Dominigo "Nick" Reyes, criticized Jews for their control of the entertainment industry. He also wrote and published a pamphlet called Chicanos and The Mass Media with Armando Rendon author of The Chicano Manifesto.

In 1975 it was sued by the Anti-Defamation League for appropriating their name, but the case was rejected by the courts.

Although it developed from an ad-hoc committee in 1967 the NMAADC further wrote letters to advertisers, broadcasters, held press conferences stating their case and threatening boycotts.

== Future of the Committee ==
The National Mexican-American Anti-Defamation Committee is led by Chicago-born political activist, and entrepreneur Carlos Peña Jr, a businessman in the Renewable Energy Industry. According to the chairman, funding for the committee will be sought to ensure [the] freedoms of Hispanics facing prejudice and racism across the country. "With the termination of DACA and constant I.C.E raids, the Mexican people are not blind to the fact that we are being pushed down in society and taken for granted. Immigration laws MUST progress but our civil rights and our freedoms as people will not be compromised".
