= Manifest Destinies: The Making of the Mexican American Race =

Manifest Destinies: The Making of the Mexican American Race is a book by Laura E. Gómez, professor of Law and American Studies at the University of New Mexico. It discusses the history of Mexican Americans in the context of race relations and racism in the United States, as well as the racial identity, legal status, and colonization patterns of Mexican Americans.

== Bibliography ==
- Gomez, Laura. Manifest Destinies: The Making of the Mexican American Race. New York: New York UP, 2007. ISBN 978-0-8147-3174-1.

=== Reviews ===
- Echeverría, Darius V. Rev. of Border Citizens: The Making of Indians, Mexicans, and Anglos in Arizona and Manifest Destinies: The Making of the Mexican American Race. Journal of American Ethnic History 28.1 (2008): 104-111.
- Quintanilla, L.J. Rev. of Manifest Destinies: The Making of the Mexican American Race. Choice: Current Reviews for Academic Libraries 45.12 (2008): 2221.
- Rev. of Manifest Destinies: The Making of the Mexican American Race. Contemporary Sociology 31.1 (2002): 105.
