= The Moths (short story) =

- Short story by Helena Maria Viramontes
- Country: USA
- Language: English

Publication
- Published in: The Moths and Other Stories
- Publisher: Arte Publico Press
- Publication date: 1985

“The Moths” is a short story written by Helena Maria Viramontes. It was first published in 1985 in Viramontes’ first book, The Moths and Other Stories, by Arte Publico Press in Houston, Texas.

== Plot summary ==
The story is a first-person narrative of a Latina granddaughter reminiscing about her relationship between her family, most especially her grandmother, when she was a teenage girl. The narrator speaks about the indifference she felt towards her sisters because she was not “pretty or nice” and could not “do the girl things they could do”. She was constantly in trouble, saying she was “used to the whippings” and spent her time watching over her grandmother since her grandmother always watched over her. Throughout the story, the grandmother becomes more and more ill, while the narrator becomes more and more responsible. When the cancer finally kills the grandmother, the granddaughter continues to take care of her, undressing her and cleansing her in the tub, as she holds her and rocks her back and forth saying “there, there Abuelita”. At this point the moths are released from the grandmother; the moths which the grandmother told the narrator “lay within the soul and slowly eat the spirit up.” The narrator cries and sobs in the tub with her grandmother until her sadness transformed into relief.

== Themes ==
Rebirth – The narrator talks about the Sun and how it cannot shine forever. It must disappear in order to reappear for the next day. As she notices the Sun’s “final burst of burning red orange fury” she also notices that “endings are inevitable [and] they are necessary for rebirths”. At this point in the story, it becomes clear that Abuelita has died. The narrator, who felt distant from her mother, was now longing to be with her, in which a new relationship was born from the death of this old one. Coming out of oppression – Helena Maria Viramontes writes often about the oppression of women and how they must learn to overcome the dictates of tradition, family, and culture. The moths represent the traditions that destroy and degrade women, and how women are only freed from such power after death.

== About the author ==
Helena Maria Viramontes is a Chicana writer, who writes about women that face the troubles of religion, identity, sexuality, family, and tradition. She is the author of works such as The Moths and Other Short Stories, Under the Feet of Jesus, and Their Dogs Came With Them. She is also co-editor of the two collections: Chicana Writes: On Word and Film and Chicana Creativity and Criticism. She received her B.A. at Immaculate Heart College in 1975, and her M.F.A at the University of California Irvine in 1994. She has won many awards and honors, such as the John Dos Passos Award for Literature, and has had the pleasure of witnessing her work used in study for classrooms and universities.
