= Frito Bandito =

Advertising mascot

- Frito Bandito
- First appearance: 1967
- Last appearance: 1971
- Voiced by: Mel Blanc

In-universe information
- Occupation: Cartoon mascot for Fritos corn chips
- Nationality: Mexican

The Frito Bandito was the cartoon mascot for Fritos corn chips from 1967 to 1971. The Bandito was created by the Foote, Cone & Belding Agency and animated by Tex Avery. The character was voiced by Mel Blanc, who used an exaggerated Mexican accent resembling that of Speedy Gonzales, another of his characters. The Frito Bandito spoke broken English and robbed people of their Fritos corn chips, a reference to the "Mexican bandit" stereotype in Western movies.

Pressure from the National Mexican-American Anti-Defamation Committee and others prompted an update to the character; his gold tooth and stubble were eliminated and his hair combed. The character was retired in 1971. He was replaced by the Muncha Bunch, a group of cowboys, and W.C. Fritos, a character modeled after comedian W.C. Fields.

== History ==
The Frito Bandito character was developed by the advertising firm Foote, Cone & Belding and launched by Frito-Lay in 1967. Actor Mel Blanc provided the character's voice, while the animation was directed by Tex Avery at Cascade Studios in California. The character was a stereotypical Mexican Revolutionary with a sombrero, handlebar moustache and thick accent consistent with images of Pancho Villa. He carried two pistols and robbed people of their Fritos corn chips at gunpoint. The Frito Bandito was originally featured in commercials that aired during children's television shows, but due to the character's popularity, Frito-Lay soon began using the Bandito in all print and television advertising.

Frito-Lay was one of several American companies that featured Mexican revolutionaries in its advertising during the late 1960s—others included the Liggett & Myers Tobacco Company, the Elgin Watch Company, and American Motors. In 1968, two Mexican-American advocacy groups were founded in opposition to the use of ethnic stereotypes in advertising: the National Mexican-American Anti-Defamation Committee (NMAADC) in Washington, D.C., and the Involvement of Mexican-Americans in Gainful Endeavors (IMAGE) in San Antonio, Texas. The Mexican-American Anti-Defamation Committee "threatened to file a $610 million defamation lawsuit against the Frito-Lay Corporation, its advertising agency, and the television networks CBS and ABC on behalf of all Mexican Americans" and claimed that the FCC fairness doctrine allowed them a right to "counter-speech" in response to marketing featuring the character. In response from pressure from the groups, Frito-Lay modified the character to appear more friendly. The gold tooth and beard were also removed. Following the assassination of Robert F. Kennedy in 1968, the Bandito no longer brandished pistols.

Despite the controversy, Frito-Lay stood by the character. The company cited a survey of four cities in California and Texas conducted by Foote, Cone & Belding which found that 85% of Mexican Americans liked the Frito Bandito. In response, IMAGE and NMAADC shifted their protests to local television stations that aired Bandito commercials. In 1969, KPIX and KRON in San Francisco, California and KNBC in Los Angeles became the first stations to ban the character. Groups also lobbied the Federal Communications Commission for free air time to respond to the Frito Bandito under the fairness doctrine.

Frito-Lay introduced a new cartoon mascot in 1969: W.C. Fritos (based on comedian W.C. Fields). By July 1970, the company had stopped airing Bandito commercials in the states of California, Oregon and Washington, replacing them with ads featuring a group of cartoon Euro-American cowboy outlaws known as Muncha Buncha. Frito-Lay ended the Frito Bandito campaign in 1971.

== Jingle ==
The Frito Bandito campaign included a song sung to the tune of the traditional Mexican song "Cielito Lindo" in sing-along-style:

Ay, ay, ay, ay!
oh, I am dee Frito Bandito.
I like Fritos corn chips,
I love them, I do.
I want Fritos corn chips.
I'll get them, from you.

Ay, ay, ay, ay,
oh, I am the Frito Bandito.
Give me Fritos corn chips
and I'll be your friend.
The Frito Bandito
you must not offend.

== See also ==
- Aunt Jemima
- Taco Bell chihuahua
- South of the Border (attraction)
