= Mexican American professionals =

Mexican American professionals have entered the workforce in growing numbers in the past several years. To be considered “professionals,” individuals of this group must attain a professional degree and operate under a license.

According to the US Census Bureau, a Mexican American is defined as an individual who can self-identify as Hispanic or Latino as part of their heritage, nationality group, lineage, country of birth, or ancestors’ country of birth. The US Census Bureau states that any individual of any race may identify themselves as of Hispanic, Latino, or Spanish origin. Thus, many individuals of Mexican American status live in each of the fifty states.

== Stereotypes ==
Current stereotypes portray Mexican Americans as professionals only in the fields of wrestling, boxing, and other sports-related careers. Studies have indicated that more Mexican Americans are attaining higher education degrees in the fields of science, health care, educational services, and social assistance. Between 2008 and 2009, Mexican Americans made up an .8% increase in educational, health care, and social assistance professional degrees acquired.

== Careers ==
Mexican Americans are increasing in numbers in college enrollment and degree completion rates. Between 2010 and 2012, college enrollment increased by .5% for the total population and by 1.4% by Mexican Americans. Mexican Americans are most often obtaining associate degrees (21.9%), bachelor’s degrees (7.0%), and graduate or professional degrees (2.9%). These numbers, from 2012, have also risen since 2010.

Mexican Americans make up 16.6% of management, business, science, and arts occupations, and 10.2% of professional, scientific, management and administrative, and waste management services occupations, compared to 36.1% and 10.9% of the general population, respectively. This shows promise for this population of individuals, as their numbers in the professional workforce continue to rise.

Mexican American professionals are growing in numbers in careers including journalism, law, engineering, healthcare, computer science, dentistry, and architecture, among many others. In March 2015, Mexican-born engineer Luis Velasco, who works at NASA, designs and engineers robots for the company. He obtained a scholarship at Brigham Young University in Provo, Utah and studied mechanical engineering.

== Future efforts ==
Groups and coalitions such as the Mexican American Latino Faculty Association at Texas A&M University and the Mexican American Business & Professional Association are united in efforts to continue the improvement and involvement of Mexican American professionals in educational settings and in the workforce. These organizations are focused on a “climate of excellence” and focusing Mexican American professionals’ involvement in areas including business, education, community leadership, and legislative domain. Other groups, including the Association of Mexican American Educators and the Mexican American Hispanic Physicians Association encourage Mexican Americans to pursue professional careers and higher education, and to provide support to this population
