= Mexican American Odyssey =

Book written by Thomas H. Kreneck

Mexican American Odyssey: Felix Tijerina, Entrepreneur and Civic Leader, 1905-1965
- Author: Thomas H. Kreneck
- Language: English
- Subject: Felix Tijerina
- Genre: Non-fiction
- Publisher: Texas A&M University Press
- Publication date: 2001
- Publication place: United States

Mexican American Odyssey: Felix Tijerina, Entrepreneur and Civic Leader, 1905-1965 is a 2001 book by Thomas H. Kreneck, published by Texas A&M University Press, discussing Houston restaurateur Felix Tijerina.

Paul H. Carlson of Texas Tech University described the book as a "sympathetic portrait", and that Kreneck had a "sense of admiration" for Tijerina. Mary Kelley of Lamar University described the book as "primarily an admiring biography of the public of Felix Tijerina".

== Background ==
Kreneck is the director of the Texas A&M University Corpus Christi Special Collections and Archives, and had served as the Houston Metropolitan Research Center's Mexican American Archives director. In his latter role he organized Tijerina's archival collection. Kreneck conducted research for this book for around twenty years, which involved using archives such as the HMRC Tijerina archives, as well as interviewing people who knew Tijerina.

== Contents ==
Mario T. García of University of California, Santa Barbara stated that Mexican American Odyssey is "clearly favorable to Tijerina" but discusses "some of Tijerina's shortcomings"; García cited Tijerina discriminating against black people in his restaurants and supporting other Jim Crow features of segregation-era Houston. In her review Kelley stated that the perception of Tijerina being an "appeaser" to said "racial discrimination", even though he was a part of LULAC, was an example of the "shortcomings" covered in the book. Christine Marin of Arizona State University noted in her review that Tijerina had politically conservative views and in regards to the NAACP had "cool feelings".

The book discusses Tijerina's biography, LULAC, and the growth of the ethnic Mexican population of Houston. Due to the latter, García described it as being both a "collective" and an "individual" biographical work.

Kelley stated that the book's emphasis on "human agency" instead of anti-Mexican discrimination and Tijerina's emphasis on biculturalism were elements of the book

== Reception ==
Carlson praised it as "soundly researched" and "engaging", stating it was a "good book".

Garna L. Christian of University of Houston-Downtown wrote that the book "contributed greatly to our knowledge of local, ethnic, and business history, as well as" that about Tijerina himself; Christian stated "one might wish for more of the personal side of Felix Tijerina that is occasionally glimpsed in passages from his correspondence".

García stated that the book is "an important piece of work", and a "solid biography", and that he "enjoyed" and "learned much from" it. García stated that "at times it reads too much as an extended vita in which the author felt compelled to cover every single activity that Tijerina participated in, both in Houston and elsewhere."

Kelley stated that Mexican American Odyssey "is a welcome addition to a growing body of Mexican American history" and "an important contribution to understanding" the rise of Mexican Americans in Houston and the history of the city's Hispanic population.

Marin stated "Overall, this is an important book." Marin criticized how there was "a mass of details" stemming from "attempts to paint a glowing picture of" Tijerina, which would result in someone becoming "bogged down trying to keep up with it all."

== See also ==
- History of the Mexican Americans in Houston

== Notes and references ==
=== References ===
- Carlson, Paul H. (2001-12-01). "Mexican American Odyssey: Felix Tijerina, Entrepreneur and Civic Leader, 1905-1965 (book review)". The Business History Review. 75 (4): 853–855. doi:10.2307/3116527. JSTOR 3116527.
- Christian, Garna L. (2003-02-01). "Mexican American Odyssey: Felix Tijerina, Entrepreneur and Civic Leader, 1905-1965 (book review)". The Journal of Southern History. 69 (1): 219–220. doi:10.2307/30039908. JSTOR 30039908.
- García, Mario T. (2003-03-01). "Mexican American Odyssey: Felix Tijerina, Entrepreneur and Civic Leader, 1905-1965 (book review)". The Journal of American History. 89 (4): 1568–1569. doi:10.2307/3092639. JSTOR 3092639.
- Kelley, Mary (2003-10-01). "Mexican American Odyssey: Felix Tijerina, Entrepreneur and Civil Leader, 1905-1965 (Book Review)". The Southwestern Historical Quarterly. 107 (2): 345–346. JSTOR 30242187.
- Marin, Christine (2002-04-01). "Mexican American Odyssey: Felix Tijerina, Entrepreneur and Civic Leader, 1905-1965 (book review)". The Western Historical Quarterly. 33 (1): 81–82. doi:10.2307/4144737. JSTOR 4144737.
