= Moment of Silence (poem) =

2002 poem by Emmanuel Ortiz

"Moment of Silence" is a poem by Emmanuel Ortiz published on September 11, 2002, the first anniversary of the September 11th, 2001 attacks. The poem discussed the history of colonialism, neocolonialism, imperialism, the war on terror, environmental racism, and structural violence as well as the attacks.

The poem begins:

Before I start this poem, I'd like to ask you to join me
In a moment of silence
In honour of those who died in the World Trade Center and the Pentagon last September 11th.

The poem goes on to critique that notion of a moment of silence. The majority of the poem serves as a list of historical crimes by governments and the West against indigenous peoples or the Third World and how the structures which perpetuate those crimes slip through the cracks, on a scale far beyond the September 11th tragedy. The poem was controversial at the time of its publication because it contested the established weighting of human experiences.
