= Barrioization =

Theory developed by Chicano scholars

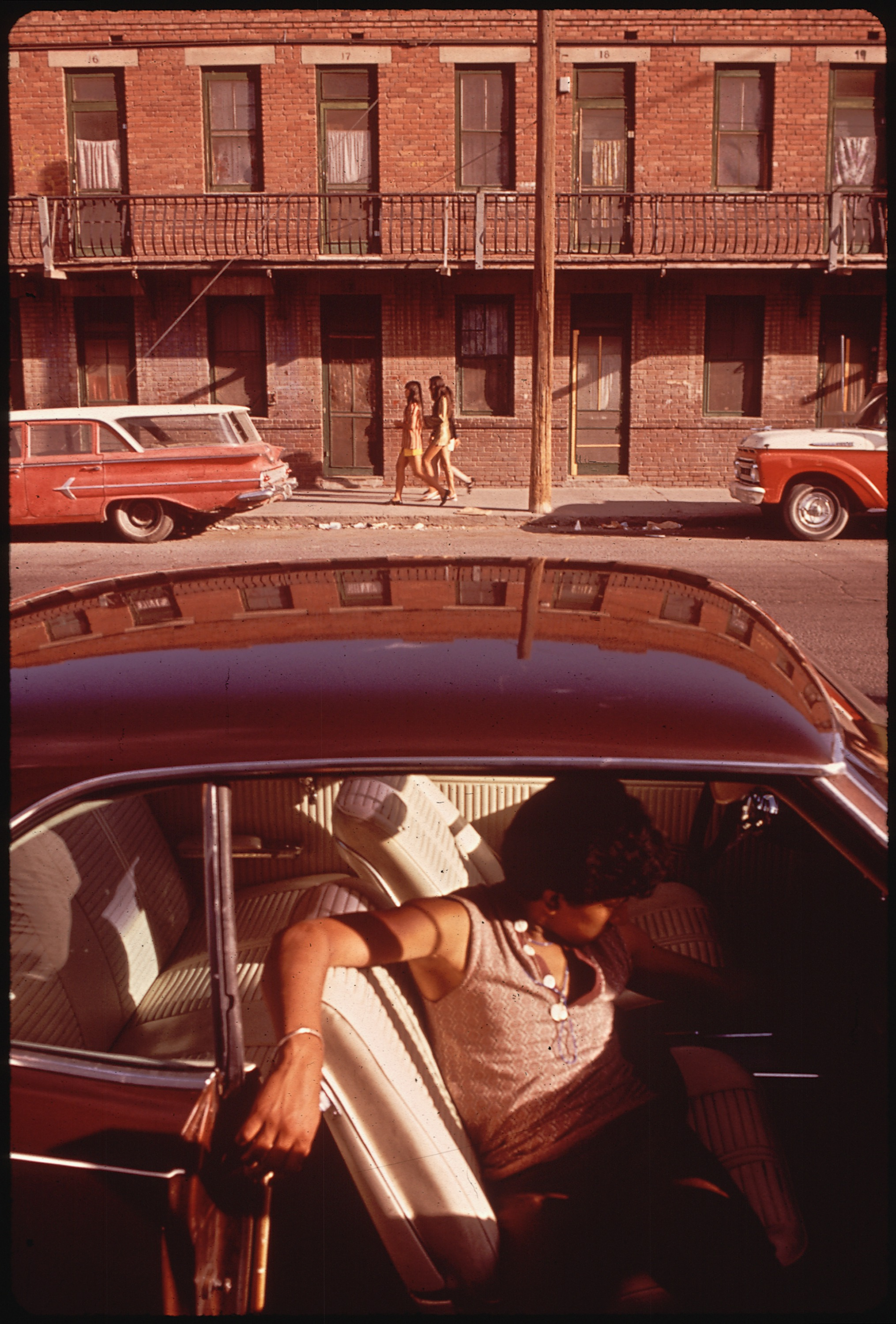
El Paso's Second Ward, a Chicano neighborhood or barrio (1972).

Barrioization or barriorization is a theory developed by Chicano scholars Albert Camarillo and Richard Griswold del Castillo to explain the historical formation and maintenance of ethnically segregated neighborhoods of Chicanos and Latinos in the United States. The term was coined by Camarillo in his book Chicanos in a Changing Society (1979). The process was explained in the context of Los Angeles by Griswold del Castillo in The Los Angeles Barrio, 1850-1890: A Social History (1979). Camarillo defined the term as "the formation of residentially and segregated Chicano barrios." The term is used in the field of Human Geography.

== Term ==
Barrioization stems from the word barrio, Spanish for neighborhood or dependency of a city. The term was first used in the context of the so-called New World to describe Aztec calpullis. The capital city of the Aztec Empire, Tenochtitlan had approximately 60 calpullis. When the Spanish colonizers overran the city in 1519, they referred to the calpullis as barrios, since at the time the word had about the same meaning in Spain. The first barrios were filled with Indigenous peoples, particularly in what is now Mexico. Over time, barrio began to refer to areas of cities in Mexico where working class lived, especially as this was the primary class categorization of Indigenous people in the colonial system.

== History ==
=== Los Angeles, California ===
Pueblo de Los Angeles was founded in 1781. Scholar Richard Griswold del Castillo states that while there is no evidence that the term barrio was used prior to 1848 in California, that the adjacent village of Yaanga "may have been considered a barrio." The pueblo was built using labor from the local indigenous village and was completely dependent on their labor for its survival. Following the Anglo-American invasion and occupation of Los Angeles, the term barrio took on new meaning. As early as 1872, Spanish-speaking editors were writing the problems of the barrio which the Anglos referred to as Sonoratown. The community was exploited for their labor and was a center for poverty, crime, and illness in the city, yet also existed as a place where Spanish-speaking residents could "feel at home and abandon the masks they wore in the Anglo world."

In 1860, Mexican Americans comprised about 75% of the entire population of the Los Angeles. The city was divided into rich and poor areas, and most recent Mexican immigrants lived in poorer districts, the largest of which was Sonoratown. Conversely, wealthy Californios lived in richer areas and moved away from the central plaza as Sonoratown expanded outward. Mexican Americans were segregated based on their limited access to property holdings and land investments in wealthier districts, which concentrated their property holdings in poorer areas of the city. While a small minority of Mexican Americans gained upward mobility, they "tended toward assimilation with Anglo-Americans" and therefore only diluted the potential strength of Mexican Americans politically. While not all Mexican Americans sought assimilation during the 19th century, many openly accepted whites into their organizations and clubs. Demographic changes in Los Angeles sharply decreased Mexican American political power by the late 19th century.

Today, the area of southeastern Los Angeles County is "home to one of the largest and highest concentrations of Latinos in Southern California," according to geographer James R. Curtis, who is commonly attributed to coining the term in AP Human Geography.
