= Vergüenza (social concept) =

Phenomena in Mexican American society

Vergüenza directly translates to shame in English, refers to the cultural and social phenomena that shapes, and often constricts Chicana/o and Latina/o lives to a more conservative, traditional mold. The role of vergüenza not only helps mold lives to a traditional mold, but serves primarily to maintain traditional gender roles, and reinforcing familial relations and expectations. Chicana/o scholars were important to theorizing and documenting verguenza, which has contributed to the fields of mental health and sociology.

Vergüenza acts as both an external and internal regulator, based on what people think, and living up to those expectations, as well as on an “internalized set of beliefs about what constitutes proper behavior and norms.” A primary factor in vergüenza is the opinion and expectations of others, this comes from different communities one identifies themselves in, including family, friends, neighborhood, as well as their religious affiliations.

== Women and Vergüenza ==
Typically, discussions surrounding vergüenza only focus and interpret vergüenza through a male perspective, but although often ignored, women are just as, and arguably even more so, affected by vergüenza and rigid expectations that follow them. Women are placed under unnatural man made scrutinized dilemmas placed dab in the middle of their minds from birth. To strut their hips in a manner that is opposite of carrying vergüenza is to disapprove and dismantle traditions built years in the making which Chicano and Chicana cultures push away. Women of all races face battles of oppressive constant slaps of the wrist for being considered a whore—puta. Forgetting to carry humility—vergüenza, can and has led to men hitting women and even men. Extreme cases and causes define vergüenza as a natural trait women need to and should carry around.

For women vergüenza, and their general standing in their community, is almost entirely dependent on their being controlled or protected by the men in their lives, be it husbands, fathers or other patriarchal figures, as well as the man's social status rather than her own. When a woman's reputation is not dependent on their patriarch's social status, it is dependent on how well an individual can adhere to the social expectations from their family, friends, and their community. Thus, stripping women of their autonomy and pushing women to be more reserved and passive, as is expected of traditional cultural mold. Andando con vergüenza then becomes a priority. These images of passivity are further reinforced not only by the community around them, but also through literature and religious beliefs.

=== Expectations From the Community ===
'Chismes', or gossip, typically holds a negative connotation, but across transnational communities it can be seen as something positive; gossip is often used, as direct communication between families and communities is scarce, as a means to bring a community together and share information with one another. Gossip is also a negative and oppressive force within communities; it can be used to target, criticize and ostracize those who do not follow a community's standards or expectations. Gossip not only serves as a way to bring people together, but also as a reference to teach oneself how to act appropriately in a given community in order to save face from criticism—hearing how others are ostracized for differing from a community sets an example of what is not acceptable and should be avoided.

==== Accusations of Women's Fidelity ====
Women in transnational communities—whether they are the ones staying behind as their husband migrates or they themselves are migrating to the United States—are also often targeted by the larger community through gossip and local criticism. When men migrate to the U.S., their wives not only have to worry about their partners potentially abandoning them, but also be careful that they are not accused of cheating while their husbands are away; some women going as far as avoiding going to social events or town festivities to avoid accusations. These accusations not only come from the woman's community out of criticism for joining social events rather than mourning the absence of their husbands, but also from the husband himself. Migrant husbands—out of paranoia and stress while they are away—can be the root of an accusation against his wife's fidelity. This can lead to her being isolated or expelled from her community, as well as losing the remittance he sends her, which is often her only source of income.

Even women in the United States will be under the watchful eye of the community around her, as well as back home, in regards to her fidelity to her husband, as their reputation also crosses borders. If a couple migrates together, separates, and forms a new relationship the man will often be unquestioned, but the woman, and her new relationship, will be targeted by her community and questioned whether her new relationship will interfere with her family obligations. Men can often, but not always, escape any criticism or gossip regarding their infidelity, because of their social status, their continued financial support to a family, or because they are men and it is expected of them to act on physical urges. More often than not, when a husband abroad is unfaithful, women are still to blame—be it the wife for staying behind and not being there to satisfy his urges, or the other woman whom he had an affair with. The other woman are often blamed because they “should [have known] who they are getting involved with and not believe everything he says.”

==== Women Targeted in the LGBT Community ====
The LGBT community is one community in particular that is often targeted by mainstream society, as being queer acts as “a mirror reflecting heterosexual tribe’s [primary] fear: being different” and defying the societal “norm.” As a result, lesbians in Latin America who fear exposing their closeted selves, learn to create and alternate between two identities: one in which they are “out” and another within the family, and neighboring community, where they are closeted. Each identity, and its accompanying community, holds different norms, expectations, and values that Latina lesbians must navigate through. Latina lesbians in the United States, on the other hand, must create these two identities, as well as a third, as they navigate between a gay community, their familial, Latinx community, and the dominant cis, white, heterosexual community in the United States. Lesbians often feel the need to sacrifice their “out” identity and relationships in order respect their family and maintain familial relationships.

However, Latina lesbians who do come out to their families are not always accepted with open arms. The obvious, inherently traumatizing, reaction from families is alienation and rejection from the family. Another common reaction from families is initial acceptance, but altogether avoidance and silencing their daughter and her sexuality. Parents who know their daughter's sexuality tend to avoid it or ask them not to share that information with anyone outside the family, out of shame of their daughter not complying to traditional norms and expectations—i.e. finding a husband, having children, starting a family, etc. -- or fear of how the surrounding community would react to her.

Families, rather than openly communicating with their daughters, will often repeat the phrase De eso no se habla, of that we do not speak, preferring to remain in denial about their daughter's sexuality and silencing her from speaking to them about it in the future. Daughters who do come out to their parents and are met with this response feel not only a denial of their identity as lesbians, but also their identity as daughter within the family.

=== Expectations From the Family ===
Women, both who migrate abroad and remain in their home country, are blamed not only for the failure of their marriage, but also questioned about their relationship with their children and family back home. Women accused of infidelity, abroad and at home, are then questioned of their commitment to their children and family, not only by their community, but by their children as well. While the community will feed into this accusation and let it fester among them, it will inevitably reach the women's children, through family members, neighbors, or even classmates, and the children will begin to resent their mother for choosing a romantic relationship over her family. Amongst social circles, it is expected of a woman to place her responsibility as a mother, and primary caretaker for her children, over her personal interests. Women are either expected to find an impossible balance between personal life and family life, or give up their personal lives altogether because motherhood is viewed traditionally as sacred.

=== Expectations From the Church ===
The traditional idea that motherhood is an inherently sacred and essential role of a woman traditionally Catholic beliefs, and the depiction of La Virgen. La Virgen has been represented as an ideal repressed passive womanhood—suffering, pure, and patient female, all traits traditionally expected of woman, especially when they enter motherhood. In contrast to the depiction of La Virgen, there is la Puta, La Llorona, or Malinche. These women all serve to as examples of what positive and negative femininity, and motherhood, are made up of—La Virgen being positive and idealized and the others negative and should be avoided. The depiction and idealization of La Virgen is especially significant to Latinas through the idea of marianismo: "when women become mothers then, and only then, do they attain the status of Madonna." This not only encourages women to have children to achieve status in society, but also serves to punish those who do not fit this expectation or social mold.

Depictions of religious figures, and the expectations that follow them, are not the only religious elements in Latin culture that serve to control women's conduct in society; the Catholic church is directly responsible as well. The Catholic church is patriarchal by nature, and practices this power over women through its rigid structure and sense of morality, especially in regards to women's sexuality. Women under the Catholic church do no feel free in, or with, their bodies as they have been raised with ideas regarding sex, especially premarital sex, as sinful, and received little to no sexual education through the church. This leads to woman who stray from Church expectations of purity and celibacy to feel guilt, remorse, and shame for exploring their sexual identities.

== See also ==
- Badge of shame
- Cognitive dissonance
- Embarrassment
- Guilt (emotion)
- Haya (Islam)
- Lady Macbeth effect
