= Bracero Program =

1942–1964 migrant worker program

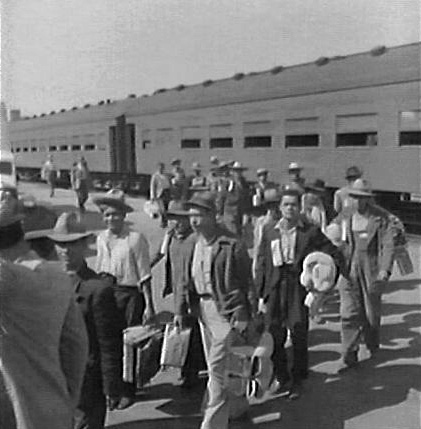
Braceros arriving in Los Angeles in 1942

The Bracero Program (from the Spanish term bracero [bɾaˈse.ɾo], meaning "manual laborer" or "one who works using his arms") was a temporary labor initiative from 1942 to 1964 between the United States and Mexico that allowed Mexican workers to be employed in the U.S. agricultural and railroad industries.

In studies published in 2018 and 2023, it was found that the Bracero Program did not have an adverse effect on the wages or employment for American-born farm workers, and that termination of the program had adverse impact on American-born farmers and resulted in increased farm mechanization.

== Origins and purpose ==
The program, which was designed to fill agriculture shortages during World War II, offered employment contracts to 4.6 million braceros in 24 U.S. states. It was the largest guest worker program in U.S. history.

The program was the result of a series of laws and diplomatic agreements, initiated on August 4, 1942, when the United States signed the Mexican Farm Labor Agreement with Mexico. The program was jointly managed by the U.S. State Department, Department of Labor, and the Immigration and Naturalization Service (INS). Under the agreement, braceros were promised fair treatment, including:

- Adequate living conditions (shelter, food, and sanitation),
- A minimum wage of 30 cents per hour,
- Protection from being drafted into military service,
- A requirement that a portion of their wages be saved in accounts in Mexico.

Workers were also legally protected against discrimination, including being excluded from whites-only areas. The program also allowed the importation of contract laborers from Guam as a temporary measure during the early phases of World War II.

== Program expansion and continuation ==
The agreement was extended with the Migrant Labor Agreement of 1951 (Pub. L. 82–78), enacted as an amendment to the Agricultural Act of 1949 by the United States Congress, which set the official parameters for the Bracero Program until its termination in 1964.

Since abolition of the Bracero Program, temporary agricultural workers have been admitted with H-2 and H-2A visas.

== Introduction ==
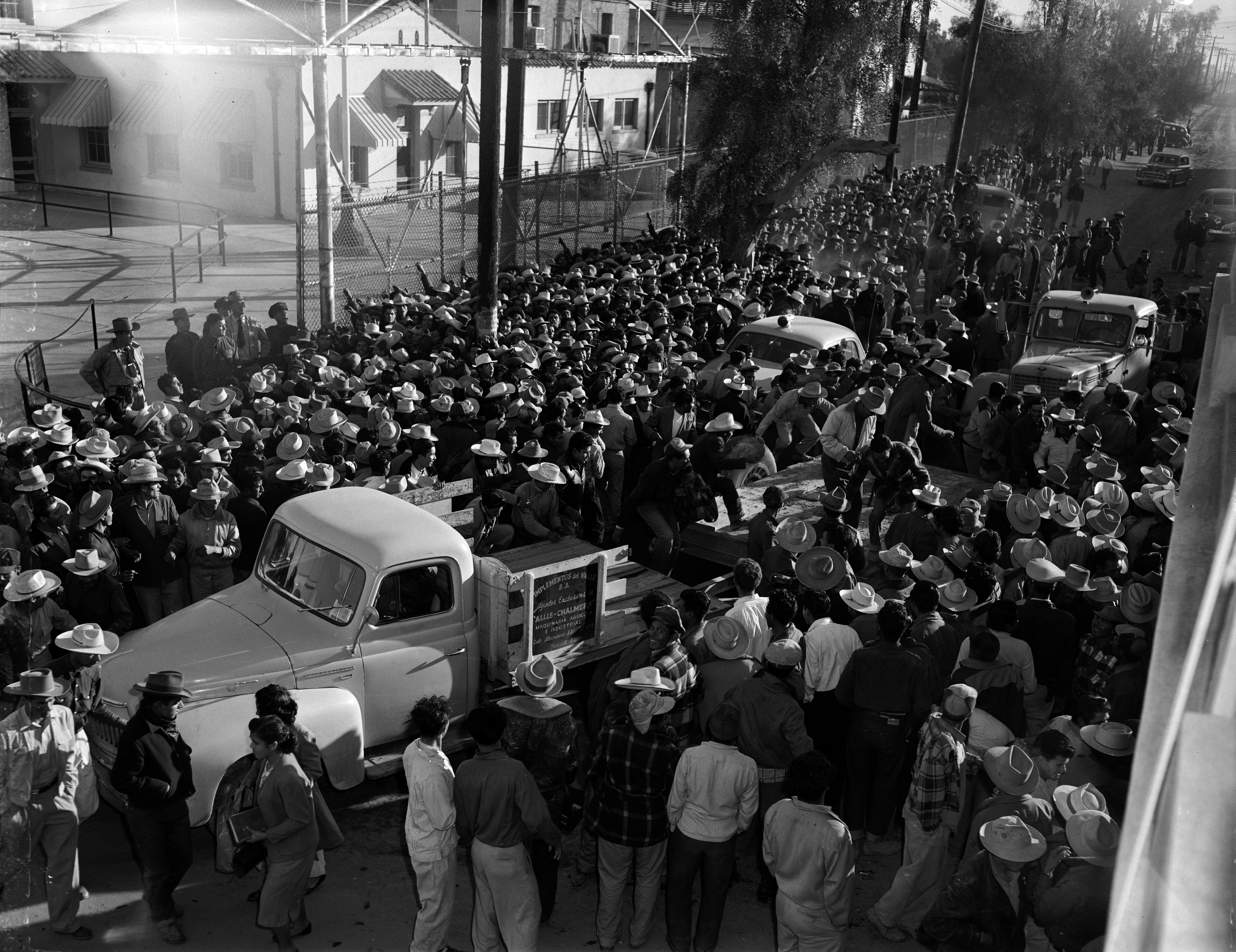
Mexican workers await legal employment in the United States, 1954

The Bracero Program operated as a joint program under the State Department, the Department of Labor, and the Immigration and Naturalization Services (INS) in the Department of Justice. Under this pact, the laborers were promised decent living conditions in labor camps, such as adequate shelter, food and sanitation, as well as a minimum wage pay of 30 cents an hour. The agreement also stated that braceros would not be subject to discrimination such as exclusion from "white" areas.

This program, which commenced in Stockton, California in August 1942, was intended to fill the labor shortage in agriculture because of World War II. In Texas, the program was banned by Mexico for several years during the mid-1940s due to the discrimination and maltreatment of Mexicans, which included lynchings along the border. Texas Governor Coke Stevenson pleaded on several occasions to the Mexican government that the ban be lifted to no avail. The program lasted 22 years and offered employment contracts to 5 million braceros in 24 U.S. states—becoming the largest foreign worker program in U.S. history.

The Mexican government, at the federal, state, and local levels, handled the selection of workers for the Bracero Program. The Mexican states of Guanajuato, Jalisco, and Michoacán, supplied large numbers of laborers to the United States. Political issues such as opposition to the ruling political party, disputes with labor unions, and even local responses to natural disasters played a key role in deciding who could leave Mexico to work in the U.S. This decentralized system meant that local officials had considerable control over who received contracts, which often led to favoritism, bribery, and corruption.

From 1942 to 1947, only a relatively small number of braceros were admitted, accounting for less than 10 percent of U.S. hired workers. Yet both U.S. and Mexican employers became heavily dependent on braceros for willing workers; bribery was a common way to get a contract during this time. Consequently, several years of the short-term agreement led to an increase in undocumented immigration and a growing preference for operating outside of the parameters set by the program.

Moreover, Truman's Commission on Migratory Labor in 1951 disclosed that the presence of Mexican workers depressed the income of American farmers, even as the U.S. Department of State urged a new bracero program to counter the popularity of communism in Mexico. Furthermore, it was seen as a way for Mexico to be involved in the Allied armed forces. The first braceros were admitted on September 27, 1942, for the sugar-beet harvest season. From 1948 to 1964, the U.S. allowed in on average 200,000 braceros per year. For some, it took up to 6 months of waiting to enter legally to work as a Bracero.

== Braceros in the railroad industry ==
In 1942 when the Bracero Program came to be, it was not only agriculture work that was contracted, but also railroad work. Just like braceros working in the fields, Mexican contract workers were recruited to work on the railroads. The Southern Pacific railroad was having a hard time keeping full-time rail crews on hand. The dilemma of short handed crews prompted the railway company to ask the government permission to have workers come in from Mexico. The railroad version of the Bracero Program carried many similarities to agricultural braceros. It was written that, "The bracero railroad contract would preserve all the guarantees and provisions extended to agricultural workers." Only eight short months after agricultural braceros were once again welcomed to work, so were braceros on the railroads. The "Immigration and Naturalization authorized, and the U.S. attorney general approved under the 9th Proviso to Section 3 of the Immigration Act of February 5, 1917, the temporary admission of unskilled Mexican non-agricultural workers for railroad track and maintenance-of-way employment. The authorization stipulated that railroad braceros could only enter the United States for the duration of the war."

Over the course of the next few months, braceros began coming in by the thousands to work on railroads. Multiple railroad companies began requesting Mexican workers to fill labor shortages. Bracero railroaders were also in understanding of an agreement between the U.S. and Mexico to pay a living wage, and provide adequate food, housing, and transportation. Similarly, to the agricultural braceros, the exploitation of the railroad work braceros went on well into the 1960s.

== Postwar policy shifts and labor controversies ==
After World War II, American agricultural employers pushed for a renewed Bracero Program to ensure a stable labor force for planting and harvesting crops. During 1948 negotiations, Mexico demanded that the U.S. penalize employers who hired undocumented workers, but this provision was not included in the final legislation.

President Truman signed Public Law 78 (which did not include employer sanctions) in July 1951. Soon after it was signed, United States negotiators met with Mexican officials to prepare a new bilateral agreement. This agreement made it so that the U.S. government were the guarantors of the contract, not U.S. employers. The braceros could not be used as replacement workers for U.S. workers on strike; however, the braceros were not allowed to go on strike or renegotiate wages. The agreement set forth that all negotiations would be between the two governments.

A year later, the Immigration and Nationality Act of 1952 was passed by the 82nd United States Congress whereas President Truman vetoed the U.S. House immigration and nationality legislation on June 25, 1952. The H.R. 5678 bill conceded a federal felony for knowingly concealing, harboring, or shielding a foreign national or undocumented migrant. However the Texas Proviso stated that employing unauthorized workers would not constitute as "harboring or concealing" them. This also led to the establishment of the H-2A visa program, which enabled laborers to enter the U.S. for temporary work. There were a number of hearings about the United States–Mexico migration, which overheard complaints about Public Law 78 and how it did not adequately provide them with a reliable supply of workers. Simultaneously, unions complained that the braceros' presence was harmful to U.S. workers.

The outcome of this meeting was that the United States ultimately got to decide how the workers would enter the country by way of reception centers set up in various Mexican states and at the United States border. At these reception centers, potential braceros had to pass a series of examinations. The first step in this process required that the workers pass a local level selection before moving onto a regional migratory station where the laborers had to pass a number of physical examinations.

Lastly, at the U.S. reception centers, workers were inspected by health departments, stripped and sprayed with DDT, a dangerous pesticide.

They were then sent to contractors that were looking for workers. Operations were primarily run by the United States Public Health Service (USPHS) along with other military personnel. Braceros frequently dealt with harassment from these officials and could be kept for extended periods of time in the examination rooms. These rooms held as many as 40 men at a time, and migrants would have to wait 6 or more hours to be examined. According to first hand accounts, personnel would often process 800 to 1600 braceros at a time and, on occasion, upwards of 3100. The invasive health procedures and overcrowded processing centers would continue to persist throughout the program's 22-year tenure.

To address the large amount of undocumented migrants in the United States, the Immigration and Naturalization Service launched Operation Wetback in June 1954, as a way to repatriate unauthorized laborers back to Mexico.

Statistics from the Department of Homeland Security show that there were 17,695 "removals" and 232,769 "returns" during the 1955 fiscal year from July 1, 1954, to June 30, 1955. The program ended a few months after the 1955 fiscal year. The criticisms of unions and churches made their way to the U.S. Department of Labor, as they lamented that the braceros were negatively affecting the U.S. farmworkers in the 1950s. In 1955, the AFL and CIO spokesman testified before a Congressional committee against the program, citing lack of enforcement of pay standards by the Labor Department. The Department of Labor eventually acted upon these criticisms and began closing numerous bracero camps in 1957–1958, they also imposed new minimum wage standards and in 1959 they demanded that American workers recruited through the Employment Service be entitled to the same wages and benefits as the braceros.

== Emergency farm labor program and federal public laws ==
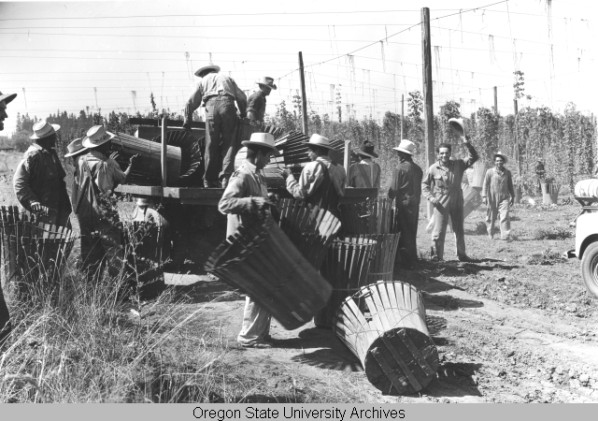
Mexican farm workers in Oregon during the Bracero Program

1942–1947 Emergency Farm Labor Supply Program
Year	Number of Braceros	Applicable U.S. Law	Date of Enactment
1942	4,203	56 Stat. 1759, E.A.S. 278—No. 312	August 4, 1942
1943	(44,600)	Pub. L. 78–45 | 57 Stat. 70	April 29, 1943
1944	62,170	Pub. L. 78–229 | 58 Stat. 11	February 14, 1944
1945	(44,600)	Pub. L. 79–269 | 59 Stat. 632	December 28, 1945
1946	(44,600)	Pub. L. 79–731 | 60 Stat. 1062	August 14, 1946
1947	(30,000)	Pub. L. 80–40 | 61 Stat. 55	April 28, 1947
1947	(30,000)	Pub. L. 80–76 | 61 Stat. 106	May 26, 1947
1947	(30,000)	Pub. L. 80–131 | 61 Stat. 202	June 30, 1947
1947	(30,000)	Pub. L. 80–298 | 61 Stat. 694	July 31, 1947

1948–1964 Farm Labor Supply Program
Year	Number of Braceros	Applicable U.S. Law	Date of Enactment
1948	(30,000)	Pub. L. 80–893 | 62 Stat. 1238	July 3, 1948
1948–50	(79,000/yr)	Period of administrative agreements	
1951	192,000	Pub. L. 82–78 | 65 Stat. 119	July 12, 1951
1952	197,100	Agricultural Act, 1949 Amended—Title V	July 12, 1951
1953	201,380	Pub. L. 83–237 | 67 Stat. 500	August 8, 1953
1954	309,033	Pub. L. 83–309 | 68 Stat. 28	March 16, 1954
1955	398,650	Pub. L. 84–319 | 69 Stat. 615	August 9, 1955
1956	445,197	Agricultural Act, 1949 Amended—Title V	July 12, 1951
1957	436,049	Agricultural Act, 1949 Amended—Title V	July 12, 1951
1958	432,491	Pub. L. 85–779 | 72 Stat. 934	August 27, 1958
1959	437,000	Agricultural Act, 1949 Amended—Title V	July 12, 1951
1960	319,412	Pub. L. 86–783 | 74 Stat. 1021	September 14, 1960
1961	296,464	Pub. L. 87–345 | 75 Stat. 761	October 3, 1961
1962	198,322	Agricultural Act, 1949 Amended—Title V	July 12, 1951
1963	186,000	Agricultural Act, 1949 Amended—Title V	July 12, 1951
1964	179,298	Pub. L. 88–203 | 77 Stat. 363	December 13, 1963

The workers who participated in the bracero program have generated significant local and international struggles challenging the U.S. government and Mexican government to identify and return 10 percent mandatory deductions taken from their pay, from 1942 to 1948, for savings accounts that they were legally guaranteed to receive upon their return to Mexico at the conclusion of their contracts. Many field working braceros never received their savings, but most railroad working braceros did.

Lawsuits presented in federal courts in California, in the late 1990s and early 2000s (decade), highlighted the substandard conditions and documented the ultimate destiny of the savings accounts deductions, but the suit was thrown out because the Mexican banks in question never operated in the United States. Today, it is stipulated that ex-braceros can receive up to $3,500.00 as compensation for the 10% only by supplying check stubs or contracts proving they were part of the program during 1942 to 1948. It is estimated that, with interest accumulated, $500 million is owed to ex-braceros, who continue to fight to receive the money owed to them.

== Organized labor ==
=== Notable strikes ===
- January–February (exact dates aren't noted) 1943: In Burlington, Washington, braceros strike because farmers were paying higher wages to whites than to the braceros doing similar work
- 1943: In Medford, Oregon, one of the first notable strikes was by a group of braceros that staged a work stoppage to protest their pay based on per box versus per hour. The growers agreed to pay them 75 cents an hour versus the 8 or 10 cents per box.
- May 1944: Braceros in Preston, Idaho, struck over wages
- July and September 1944: Braceros near Rupert and Wilder, Idaho, strike over wages
- October 1944: Braceros in Sugar City and Lincoln, Idaho refused to harvest beets after earning higher wages picking potatoes
- May–June 1945: Bracero asparagus cutters in Walla Walla, Washington, struck for twelve days complaining they grossed only between $4.16 and $8.33 in that time period
- June 1945: Braceros from Caldwell-Boise sugar beet farms struck when hourly wages were 20 cents less than the established rate set by the County Extension Service. They won a wage increase.
- June 1945: In Twin Falls, Idaho, 285 braceros went on strike against the Amalgamated Sugar Company for two days which resulted in them effectively receiving a 50 cent raise which put them 20 cents over the prevailing wage of the contracted labor
- June 1945: Three weeks later, braceros at Emmett struck for higher wages
- July 1945: In Idaho Falls, 170 braceros organized a sit-down strike that lasted nine days after fifty cherry pickers refused to work at the prevailing rate.
- October 1945: In Klamath Falls, Oregon, braceros and transient workers from California refuse to pick potatoes due to insufficient wages
- A majority of Oregon's Mexican labor camps were affected by labor unrest and stoppages in 1945
- November 1946: In Wenatchee, Washington, 100 braceros refused to be transported to Idaho to harvest beets and demanded a train back to Mexico.

The number of strikes in the Pacific Northwest is much longer than this list. Two strikes, in particular, should be highlighted for their character and scope: the Japanese-Mexican strike of 1943 in Dayton, Washington and the June 1946 strike of 1000 plus braceros that refused to harvest lettuce and peas in Idaho.

=== 1943 strike ===
The 1943 strike in Dayton, Washington, is unique in the unity it showed between Mexican braceros and Japanese-American workers. The wartime labor shortage not only led to tens of thousands of Mexican braceros being used on Northwest farms, it also saw the U.S. government allow some ten thousand Japanese Americans, who were placed against their will in internment camps during World War II, to leave the camps in order to work on farms in the Northwest. The strike at Blue Mountain Cannery erupted in late July. After "a white female came forward stating that she had been assaulted and described her assailant as 'looking Mexican' ... the prosecutor's and sheriff's office imposed a mandatory 'restriction order' on both the Mexican and Japanese camps." No investigation took place nor were any Japanese or Mexican workers asked their opinions on what happened.

The Walla Walla Union-Bulletin reported the restriction order read:

Males of Japanese and or Mexican extraction or parentage are restricted to that area of Main Street of Dayton, lying between Front Street and the easterly end of Main Street. The aforesaid males of Japanese and or Mexican extraction are expressly forbidden to enter at any time any portion of the residential district of said city under penalty of law.

The workers' response came in the form of a strike against this perceived injustice. Some 170 Mexicans and 230 Japanese struck. After multiple meetings including some combination of government officials, Cannery officials, the county sheriff, the Mayor of Dayton and representatives of the workers, the restriction order was voided. Those in power actually showed little concern over the alleged assault. Their real concern was ensuring the workers got back into the fields. Authorities threatened to send soldiers to force them back to work. Two days later the strike ended. Many of the Japanese and Mexican workers had threatened to return to their original homes, but most stayed there to help harvest the pea crop.

==== Wage discrepancies ====
The U.S. and Mexico made an agreement to garnish bracero wages, save them for the contracted worker (agriculture or railroad), and put them into bank accounts in Mexico for when the bracero returned to their home. Like many, braceros who returned home did not receive those wages. Many never had access to a bank account at all. It is estimated that the money the U.S. "transferred" was about $32 million. Often braceros would have to take legal action in attempts to recover their garnished wages. According to bank records money transferred often came up missing or never went into a Mexican banking system. In addition to the money transfers being missing or inaccessible by many braceros, missing wage payments existed up and down the railroads, as well as in all the country's farms.

=== Reasons for strikes in the Northwest ===
One key difference between the Northwest and braceros in the Southwest or other parts of the United States involved the lack of Mexican government labor inspectors. According to Galarza, "In 1943, ten Mexican labor inspectors were assigned to ensure contract compliance throughout the United States; most were assigned to the Southwest and two were responsible for the northwestern area." The lack of inspectors made the policing of pay and working conditions in the Northwest extremely difficult. The farmers set up powerful collective bodies like the Associated Farmers Incorporated of Washington with a united goal of keeping pay down and any union agitators or communists out of the fields. The Associated Farmers used various types of law enforcement officials to keep "order" including privatized law enforcement officers, the state highway patrol, and even the National Guard.

Another difference is the proximity, or not, to the Mexican border. In the Southwest, employers could easily threaten braceros with deportation knowing the ease with which new braceros could replace them. However, in the Northwest due to the much farther distance and cost associated with travel made threats of deportation harder to follow through with. Braceros in the Northwest could not easily skip out on their contracts due to the lack of a prominent Mexican-American community which would allow for them to blend in and not have to return to Mexico as so many of their counterparts in the Southwest chose to do and also the lack of proximity to the border.

Knowing this difficulty, the Mexican consulate in Salt Lake City, and later the one in Portland, Oregon, encouraged workers to protest their conditions and advocated on their behalf much more than the Mexican consulates did for braceros in the Southwest. Combine all these reasons together and it created a climate where braceros in the Northwest felt they had no other choice, but to strike in order for their voices to be heard.

Braceros met the challenges of discrimination and exploitation by finding various ways in which they could resist and attempt to improve their living conditions and wages in the Pacific Northwest work camps. Over two dozen strikes were held in the first two years of the program. One common method used to increase their wages was by "loading sacks" which consisted of braceros loading their harvest bags with rock in order to make their harvest heavier and therefore be paid more for the sack. Also, braceros learned that timing was everything. Strikes were more successful when combined with work stoppages, cold weather, and a pressing harvest period. The notable strikes throughout the Northwest proved that employers would rather negotiate with braceros than to deport them, employers had little time to waste as their crops needed to be harvested and the difficulty and expense associated with the bracero program forced them to negotiate with braceros for fair wages and better living conditions.

Braceros were also discriminated and segregated in the labor camps. Some growers went to the extent of building three labor camps, one for whites, one for blacks, and the one for Mexicans. For example, in 1943 in Grants Pass, Oregon, 500 braceros suffered food poisoning, one of the most severe cases reported in the Northwest. This detrition of the quality and quantity of food persisted into 1945 until the Mexican government intervened. Lack of food, poor living conditions, discrimination, and exploitation led braceros to become active in strikes and to successfully negotiate their terms.

== Impact and influence of home life ==
=== US government censorship of family contact ===
As men stayed in the U.S., wives, girlfriends, and children were left behind often for decades. Bracero men searched for ways to send for their families and saved their earnings for when their families were able to join them. In the U.S., they made connections and learned the culture, the system, and worked to found a home for a family. U.S. Consulate officials would censor letters those whom were of Mexican descent and varying legal status, both men and women. These letters went through the US postal system and originally they were inspected before being posted for anything written by the men indicating any complaints about unfair working conditions. However, once it became known that men were actively sending for their families to permanently reside in the US, they were often intercepted, and many men were left with no responses from their women. Permanent settlement of bracero families was feared by the US, as the program was originally designed as a temporary work force which would be sent back to Mexico eventually. Many Braceros moved their families to towns near the U.S.-Mexico border, helping urbanize those towns into cities.

=== Women's experiences in the Bracero Program ===
In La Pena Negra, Mayra Lizette Avila centers the experiences of Mexican women who were deeply affected by the U.S.-Mexico Bracero Program (1942–1964), which brought millions of Mexican men to the U.S. for temporary labor. The study explores how these women managed the absence of male breadwinners, shouldering new roles in both the household and community. Avila draws from oral histories and archival sources to highlight individual stories. For example, some women became sole providers, working in agriculture, managing family finances, and raising children alone. This was a sudden shift in traditional gender roles. Others reported feelings of abandonment, especially when their husbands failed to return or sent little money home. Divorce and familial estrangement also became more common, particularly among women who challenged expectations of passive loyalty. Yet, the work also emphasizes resilience and power for these women. Some women used extended kinship networks or created informal community support systems to survive economically and emotionally. Avila positions these experiences as crucial to understanding the broader impact of transnational labor migration, not just for those who migrated, but for those who stayed.

Due to the shortage of labor in northern Mexico caused by the Bracero Program, Avila Camacho, the former president of Mexico, was under pressure to fill those gaps. In 1944, Camacho endorsed a campaign for women to join the workforce to balance the shortage.

== Effects ==
After the 1964 termination of the Bracero Program, the A-TEAM, or Athletes in Temporary Employment as Agricultural Manpower, program of 1965 was meant to simultaneously deal with the resulting shortage of farmworkers and a shortage of summer jobs for teenagers. More than 18,000 17-year-old high school students were recruited to work on farms in Texas and California. Only 3,300 ever worked in the fields, and many of them quickly quit or staged strikes because of the poor working conditions, including oppressive heat and decrepit housing. The program was cancelled after the first summer.

The year after the Bracero program was terminated, the Hart-Celler Act was passed, placing caps on the number of visas granted to residents of the Western hemisphere for the first time in United States history. By the time the Hart-Celler Act was implemented and the Bracero program was fully phased out, the vast majority of former employers could not hire braceros, so employers began sponsoring Braceros for permanent residence to ensure continued access to their services and the overall number of migrants entering the US remained about the same as during the Bracero program.

The Catholic Church in Mexico was opposed to the Bracero Program, objecting to the separation of husbands and wives and the resulting disruption of family life; to the supposed exposure of migrants to vices such as prostitution, alcohol, and gambling in the United States; and to migrants' exposure to Protestant missionary activity while in the United States. Starting in 1953, Catholic priests were assigned to some bracero communities, and the Catholic Church engaged in other efforts specifically targeted at braceros.

Labor unions that tried to organize agricultural workers after World War II targeted the Bracero Program as a key impediment to improving the wages of domestic farm workers. These unions included the National Farm Laborers Union (NFLU), later called the National Agricultural Workers Union (NAWU), headed by Ernesto Galarza, and the Agricultural Workers Organizing Committee (AWOC), AFL-CIO. During his tenure with the Community Service Organization, César Chávez received a grant from the AWOC to organize in Oxnard, California, which culminated in a protest of domestic U.S. agricultural workers of the U.S. Department of Labor's administration of the program. In January 1961, in an effort to publicize the effects of bracero labor on labor standards, the AWOC led a strike of lettuce workers at 18 farms in the Imperial Valley, an agricultural region on the California-Mexico border and a major destination for braceros.

Prior to the end of the Bracero Program in 1964, the Chualar bus crash in Salinas, California made headlines illustrating just how harsh braceros situations were in California. In the accident 31 braceros lost their lives in a collision with a train and a bracero transportation truck. This particular accident led activist groups from agriculture and the cities to come together and strongly oppose the Bracero Program. Griego, a political scientist discusses the bargaining position of both countries, arguing that the Mexican government lost all real bargaining-power after 1950. In addition to the surge of activism in American migrant labor the Chicano Movement was now in the forefront creating a united image on behalf of the fight against the Bracero Program.

The end of the Bracero Program in 1964 was followed by the rise to prominence of the United Farm Workers (UFW) and the subsequent transformation of American migrant labor under the leadership of César Chávez, Gilbert Padilla, and Dolores Huerta. Newly formed labor unions (sponsored by Chávez and Huerta), namely the Agricultural Workers Organizing Committee, were responsible for series of public demonstrations including the Delano grape strike. These efforts demanded change for labor rights, wages and the general mistreatment of workers that had gained national attention with the Bracero Program. Change ensued with the UFW championing a 40% wage increase for grape farm laborers nationwide. While the federal minimum wage remained at $1.25 per hour, laborers operating under the grape contract made $1.50. In order to avoid increased wages, farmers who formerly employed braceros would later turn to the mechanization of labor-intensive tasks.

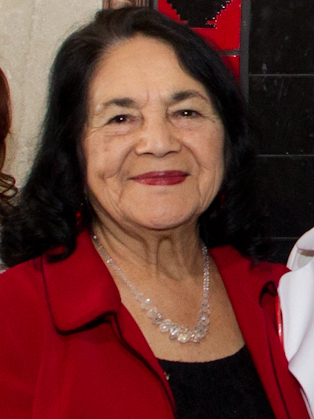
Delores Huerta. The image was taken in 2012 at the unveiling of Cesar E. Chavez Memorial Auditorium in Washington, DC.

A 1980 Congressional Research Service report found that the Bracero Program responded to US farmers' previous needs for temporary workers and was "instrumental" in significantly reducing illegal immigration by the mid-1950s. The end of the program saw a rise in Mexican immigration between 1963 and 1972, as many Mexican men who had already lived in the United States chose to return, bringing along their families. The dissolution of the Bracero program also saw a rise in undocumented immigration, with American growers hired increasing numbers of undocumented migrants. The Immigration Reform and Control Act was passed in 1986 to address the hiring of undocumented migrants by American employers.

Operation Wetback was a short-lived operation used military-style tactics to remove undocumented Mexican immigrants from the United States in 1954. Donald Trump cited it as an example of what he would do should he win the presidency during his 2016 presidential run. After its completion, Operation Wetback was hailed as having brought unauthorized immigration under control, including the deportation of over one million persons, mostly Mexican nationals.

The aftermath of the Bracero Program's effect on labor conditions for agricultural workers continues to be debated. On one hand, the end of the program allowed workers to unionize and facilitated victories made by labor organizations and other individuals. A key victory for these former braceros was the abolition of the short-handed hoe, el cortito, spurred by the efforts of American lawyer Maurice Jordan. Jordan was successfully able to win a case against California growers, claiming that the tool did not increase crop yield and caused several health issues for workers.

Some consider the H-2A visa program to be a repeat of the abuses of the Bracero Program where workers report dangerous conditions. For example, a blueberry farm worker in Washington died in August 2017 for reported 12-hour shifts under hot conditions to meet production quotas.

== In popular culture ==
- Woody Guthrie's poem "Deportee (Plane Wreck at Los Gatos)", set to music by Martin Hoffman, commemorates the deaths of 28 braceros being repatriated to Mexico in January 1948. The song has been recorded by dozens of folk artists.
- Protest singer Phil Ochs's song "Bracero" focuses on the exploitation of the Mexican workers in the program.
- A minor character in the 1948 Mexican film Nosotros los Pobres wants to become a bracero.
- The 1949 film Border Incident explores two federal agents' efforts to end a bracero-smuggling operation.
- Famed satirist Tom Lehrer wrote the song "George Murphy" about Senator George Murphy in response to an infamous racist gaffe referring to Mexican labor, which included the lines "Should Americans pick crops? George says "No" / 'Cause no-one but a Mexican would stoop so low / And after all, even in Egypt, the pharaohs / Had to import Hebrew braceros".
- The 2010 documentary Harvest of Loneliness describes the history of the bracero program. It includes interviews with several former braceros and family members, and with labor historian Henry Anderson.
- A Convenient Truth (2014) urges viewers not to let their governments repeat "the follies" of the Braceros program, during the end credits.
- In 1953, Pedro Infante recorded Canto del Bracero under Peerlees label.

== Exhibitions and collections ==
In October 2009, the Smithsonian National Museum of American History opened a bilingual exhibition titled, "Bittersweet Harvest: The Bracero Program, 1942–1964." Through photographs and audio excerpts from oral histories, this exhibition examined the experiences of bracero workers and their families while providing insight into the history of Mexican Americans and historical context to today's debates on guest worker programs. The exhibition included a collection of photographs taken by photojournalist Leonard Nadel in 1956, as well as documents, objects, and an audio station featuring oral histories collected by the Bracero Oral History Project. The exhibition closed on January 3, 2010. The exhibition was converted to a traveling exhibition in February 2010 and traveled to Arizona, California, Idaho, Michigan, Nevada, and Texas under the auspices of Smithsonian Institution Traveling Exhibition Service.

== See also ==
- 1917 Bath Riots
- 1963 Chualar bus crash
- Bracero Monument
- Bracero Selection Process
- Maquiladora
- Mexican Repatriation
- Operation Wetback
- Rio Vista Bracero Reception Center

== Bibliography ==
- Driscoll, Barbara A. (1999). The Tracks North: The Railroad Bracero Program of World War II. Austin, Texas: Center for Mexican American Studies, University of Texas at Austin. ISBN 978-0292715929. LCCN 97049865. OCLC 241413991.
- Deborah Cohen, Braceros: Migrant Citizens and Transnational Subjects in the Postwar United States and Mexico Chapel Hill, NC: University of North Carolina Press, 2011.
- García, Alberto. "Regulating Bracero Migration: How National, Regional, and Local Political Considerations Shaped the Bracero Program." Hispanic American Historical Review, vol. 101, no. 3, 2021, pp. 433–460. Duke University Press, https://doi.org/10.1215/00182168-9159802.
- Hirsch, Hans G. (1967). "Termination of the Bracero Program: Foreign Economic Aspects". Internet Archive. Foreign Agricultural Economic Report, No. 34. Washington, D.C.: Economic Research Service, U.S. Department of Agriculture. OCLC 2330552.
- Koestler, Fred L. (February 22, 2010). "Bracero Program". Handbook of Texas Online. Texas State Historical Association.
- McElroy, Robert C. (June 1965). "Termination of the Bracero Program: Some Effects on Farm Labor and Migrant Housing Needs". National Agricultural Library Digital Collections. Agricultural Economic Report, No. 77. Washington, D.C.: Economic Research Service, U.S. Department of Agriculture. OCLC 14819771. Archived from the original on May 7, 2013.
- Don Mitchell, They Saved the Crops: Labor, Landscape, and the Struggle Over Industrial Farming in Bracero-Era California. Athens, GA: University of Georgia Press, 2012.
- Ana Elizabeth Rosas, Abrazando el Espíritu: Bracero Families Confront the US-Mexico Border. Berkeley, CA: University of California Press, 2014.
- Scruggs, Otey M. (1963). "Texas and the Bracero Program, 1942–1947". Pacific Historical Review. 32 (3): 251–264. doi:10.2307/4492180. JSTOR 4492180.
- Michael Snodgrass, "The Bracero Program, 1942–1964," in Beyond the Border: The History of Mexican-U.S. Migration, Mark Overmyer-Velásquez, ed., New York: Oxford University Press, 2011, pp. 79–102.
- Michael Snodgrass, "Patronage and Progress: The bracero program from the Perspective of Mexico," in Workers Across the Americas: The Transnational Turn in Labor History, Leon Fink, ed., New York: Oxford University Press, 2011, pp. 245–266.
- Flores, Lori A. (2016). Grounds for dreaming: Mexican Americans, Mexican immigrants, and the California farmworker movement. New Haven: Yale University Press. ISBN 978-0300196962. OCLC 906878123.
- Avila, Mayra Lizette. La Pena Negra: Mexican Women, Gender, and Labor During the Bracero Program, 1942–1964. MA thesis, University of Texas at El Paso, 2018.
