= Reconquista (Mexico) =

Irredentist vision by Mexican nationalists to reclaim lost territory from the US

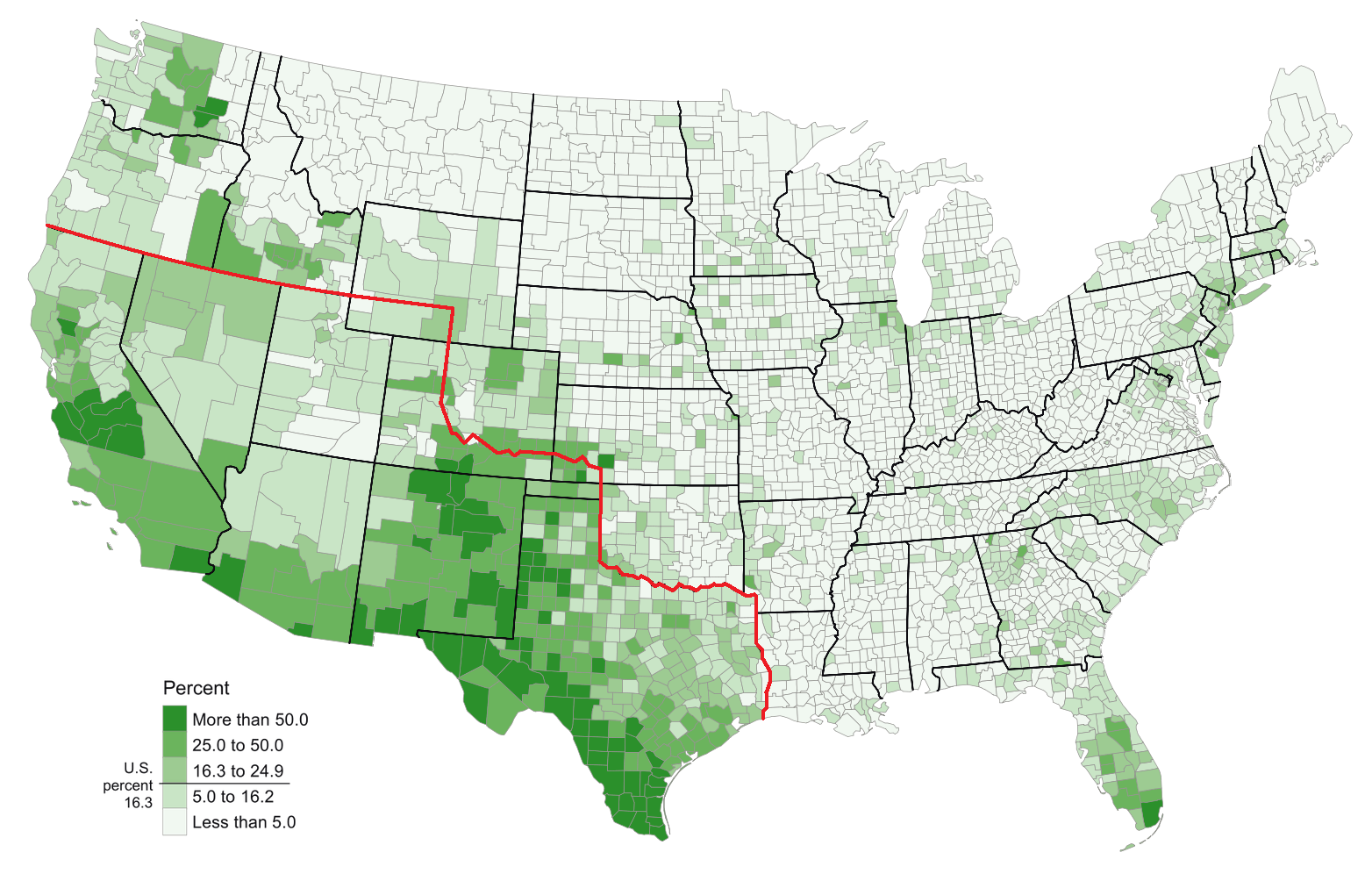
The Hispanic and Latino American proportion of population in the United States in 2010 overlaid with the Mexican–American border of 1836

The Reconquista ("reconquest") is an irredentist vision by different individuals, groups, and/or nations that the Southwestern United States should be politically or culturally returned to Mexico. Known as advocating a Greater Mexico (Spanish: México Grande), such opinions are often formed on the basis that those territories were part of the Spanish Empire for centuries and then of Mexico from 1821 until they were annexed by the United States during the Texas Annexation (1845) and the Mexican Cession (1848) because of the Mexican–American War.

== Background ==
The term Reconquista means "reconquest" and is an analogy to the Christian Reconquista of Moorish Iberia. The areas of greatest Mexican immigration and cultural diffusion are the same as with the territories that were taken by the United States from Mexico during the 19th century.

== Cultural views ==
=== Mexican writers ===
In a 2001 article on the Latin American web portal Terra, "Advancement of the Spanish language and Hispanics is like a Reconquista (Reconquest)," Elena Poniatowska stated:

A US media outlet recently stated that in some places like Los Angeles, if you didn't speak Spanish, you were "out". It's sort of a reconquista (reconquest) of lost territories that have Spanish names and were once Mexican.

[With a cordial tone, taking pauses, and with a smile on her lips, the Mexican writer commented with satisfaction the change that is happening in the US with regard to the perception of Hispanics and the progress of the Latino community in migratory movements]

The people of the cockroach, of the flea, who come from poverty and misery, are slowly advancing towards the United States and devouring it. I do not know what is to become of all this [in reference to the supposed racism that can ostensibly still be perceived in the US and other countries], but it [racism] seems to be an innate illness in mankind.

In his keynote address at the Second International Congress of the Spanish Language in Valladolid, Spain, in 2003, "Unity and Diversity of Spanish, Language of Encounters," Carlos Fuentes said:

Well, I've just used an English expression (a reference to having said 'brain trust' in the preceding paragraph) and that brings me back to the American continent, where 400 million men and women, from the Río Bravo to Cape Horn, speak Spanish in what were the domains of the Spanish Crown for 300 years; but in a continent, where, in the north of Mexico, in the United States, another 35 million people also speak Spanish, and not only in the territory that belonged to New Spain first and Mexico until 1848—that southwestern border that extends from Texas to California—but to the north Pacific of Oregon, to the midwest of Chicago and even to the east coast of New York City.

For that reason, one speaks of a reconquista (reconquering) of the old territories of the Spanish Empire in North America. But we must call attention to the fact that we need to go beyond the number of how many people speak Spanish to the question of whether or not Spanish is competitive in the fields of science, philosophy, computer science, and literature in the entire world, an issue brought up recently by Eduardo Subirats.

We can answer in the negative, that no, in the field of science, despite having prominent scientists, we cannot add, so says the great Colombian man of science, Manuel Elkin Patarroyo, we do not have, in Ibero-America, more than 1% of the scientists of the world.

In another part of his speech, Fuentes briefly returned to his idea of "reconquista:"

It is interesting to note the appearance of a new linguistic phenomenon that Doris Sommer of Harvard University, calls with grace and precision, 'the continental mixture,' spanglish or espanglés, since, sometimes, the English expression is used, and, at other times, the Spanish expression, is a fascinating frontier phenomenon, dangerous, at times, always creative, necessary or fatal like the old encounters with Náhuatl (Aztec language), for example, thanks to the Spanish language and some other languages, we can today say chocolate, tomato, avocado, and if one does not say wild turkey (guajolote), one can say turkey (pavo), that is why the French converted our word of American turkey (guajolote) into fowl of the Indies, oiseaux des Indes o dindon, while the English people, completely disoriented with regard to geography, give it the strange name of Turkey (name of the country), turkey (bird), but, perhaps due to some ambitions that are not confessable in the Mediterranean, and from Gibraltar to the Bosforus strait.

In summary, reconquista today, but, pre-factum, re-conquest - will take us to factum. The Conquest and Colonization of the Americas by way of Spain's military and its humanities was a multiple paradox. It was a catastrophe for the indigenous communities, notable for the great Indian civilizations of Mexico and Peru.

But a catastrophe, cautions María Zambrano, is only catastrophic if nothing redeeming comes of it.

From the catastrophe of the Conquest, all of us were born, the indigenous-iberian-americans. Immediately, we were mestizos, women and men of Indian blood, Spanish, and, later, African. We were Catholics, but our Christianity was in the syncretic refuge of the indigenous and African cultures. And we speak Spanish, but we gave it an American, Peruvian, Mexican inflection to the language.... the Spanish language stopped being the language of Empire, and it turned into something much more... [it became] the universal language of recognition between the European and indigenous cultures....

=== Nationalist Front of Mexico ===
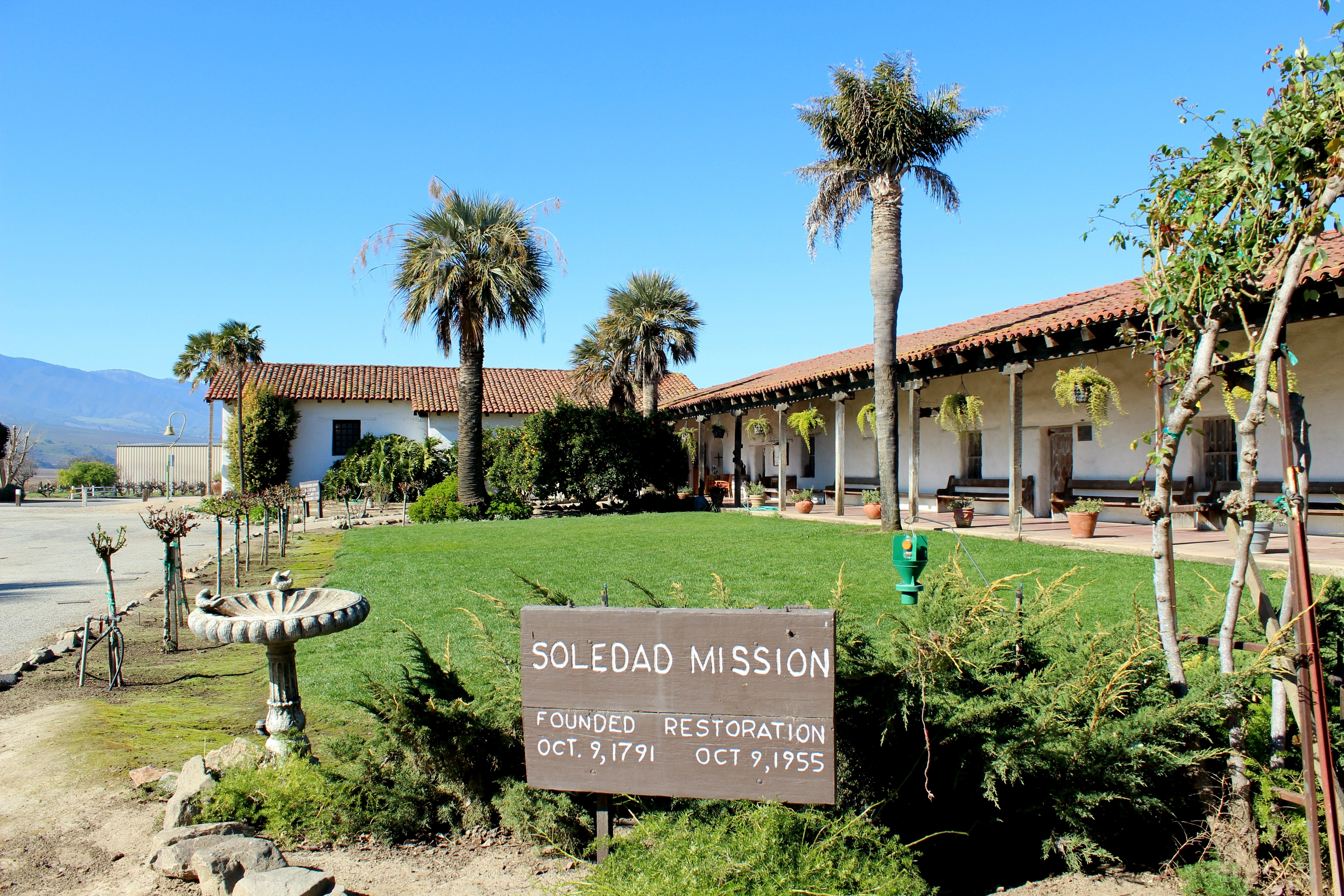
Mission Nuestra Señora de la Soledad, trading post to found Soledad, California

The far-right group Nationalist Front of Mexico opposes what it sees as Anglo-American cultural influences and rejects the Treaty of Guadalupe Hidalgo, as well as what its members consider the "American occupation" of territory formerly belonging to Mexico and now form the southwestern United States.

On its website, the front states:

We reject the occupation of our nation in its northern territories, an important cause of poverty and emigration. We demand that our claim to all the territories occupied by force by the United States be recognized in our Constitution, and we will bravely defend, according to the principle of self-determination to all peoples, the right of the Mexican people to live in the whole of our territory within its historical borders, as they existed and were recognized at the moment of our independence.

=== Charles Truxillo ===
A prominent advocate of Reconquista was the Chicano activist and adjunct professor Charles Truxillo (1953–2015) of the University of New Mexico (UNM). He envisioned a sovereign Hispanic nation, the República del Norte (Republic of the North), which would encompass Northern Mexico, Baja California, California, Arizona, New Mexico, and Texas. He supported the secession of US Southwest to form an independent Chicano nation and argued that the Articles of Confederation gave individual states full sovereignty, including the legal right to secede.

Truxillo, who taught at UNM's Chicano Studies Program on a yearly contract, suggested in an interview, "Native-born American Hispanics feel like strangers in their own land." He said, "We remain subordinated. We have a negative image of our own culture, created by the media. Self-loathing is a terrible form of oppression. The long history of oppression and subordination has to end" and that on both sides of the US–Mexico border "there is a growing fusion, a reviving of connections.... Southwest Chicanos and Norteno Mexicanos are becoming one people again." Truxillo stated that Hispanics who achieved positions of power or otherwise were "enjoying the benefits of assimilation" are most likely to oppose a new nation and explained:

There will be the negative reaction, the tortured response of someone who thinks, "Give me a break. I just want to go to Wal-Mart." But the idea will seep into their consciousness, and cause an internal crisis, a pain of conscience, an internal dialogue as they ask themselves: "Who am I in this system?"

Truxillo believed that the República del Norte would be brought into existence by "any means necessary" but that it would be formed by probably not civil war but the electoral pressure of the region's future majority Hispanic population. Truxillo added that he believed it was his duty to help develop a "cadre of intellectuals" to think about how the new state could become a reality.

In 2007, the UNM reportedly decided to stop renewing Truxillo's yearly contract. Truxillo claimed that his "firing" was because of his radical beliefs and argued, "Tenure is based on a vote from my colleagues. Few are in favor of a Chicano professor advocating a Chicano nation state."

=== José Ángel Gutiérrez ===
In an interview with In Search of Aztlán on August 8, 1999, José Ángel Gutiérrez, a political science professor at the University of Texas at Arlington, stated:

We're the only ethnic group in America that has been dismembered. We didn't migrate here or immigrate here voluntarily. The United States came to us in succeeding waves of invasions. We are a captive people, in a sense, a hostage people. It is our political destiny and our right to self-determination to want to have our homeland [back]. Whether they like it or not is immaterial. If they call us radicals or subversives or separatists, that's their problem. This is our home, and this is our homeland, and we are entitled to it. We are the host. Everyone else is a guest.... It is not our fault that whites don't make babies, and blacks are not growing in sufficient numbers, and there's no other groups with such a goal to put their homeland back together again. We do. Those numbers will make it possible. I believe that in the next few years, we will see an irredentists movement, beyond assimilation, beyond integration, beyond separatism, to putting Mexico back together as one. That's irridentism [sic]. One Mexico, one nation.

In an interview with the Star-Telegram in October 2000, Gutiérrez stated that many recent Mexican immigrants "want to recreate all of Mexico and join all of Mexico into one. And they are going to do that, even if it's just demographically.... They are going to have political sovereignty over the Southwest and many parts of the Midwest." In a videotape made by the Immigration Watchdog website, as cited in The Washington Times, Gutiérrez was quoted as saying, "We are millions. We just have to survive. We have an aging white America. They are not making babies. They are dying. It's a matter of time. The explosion is in our population." In a subsequent interview with The Washington Times in 2006, Gutiérrez backtracked and said that there was "no viable" Reconquista movement, and he blamed interest in the issue on closed-border groups and "right-wing blogs."

=== Other views ===
Felipe Gonzáles, a professor at the University of New Mexico (UNM), who is director of UNM's Southwest Hispanic Research Institute, has stated that there was a "certain homeland undercurrent" among New Mexico Hispanics, but the "educated elites are going to have to pick up on this idea [of a new nation] and run with it and use it as a point of confrontation if it is to succeed." Juan José Peña of the Hispano Round Table of New Mexico believed that Mexicans and Mexican Americans lack the political consciousness to form a separate nation: "Right now, there's no movement capable of undertaking it."

Illegal immigration to the Southwest is sometimes viewed as a form of Reconquista in light of the fact that Texas statehood was preceded by an influx of US settlers into that Mexican province until US citizens outnumbered Mexicans ten–to-one and took over the area's governance. The theory is that the reverse will happen when Mexicans eventually become so numerous in the region that they wield substantial influence, including political power. Even if it is not intended, some analysts say the significant demographic shift in the Southwest may result in "a de facto reconquista." Political scientist Samuel P. Huntington, a proponent of the widespread popularity of Reconquista, stated in 2004:

Demographically, socially and culturally, the reconquista (re-conquest) of the Southwest United States by Mexican immigrants is well under way. [However, a] meaningful move to reunite these territories with Mexico seems unlikely.... No other immigrant group in U.S. history has asserted or could assert a historical claim to U.S. territory. Mexicans and Mexican-Americans can and do make that claim.

The neoliberal political writer Mickey Kaus remarked:

Reconquista is a little—a little extreme. If you talk to people in Mexico, I'm told, if you get them drunk in a bar, they'll say we're taking it back, sorry. That's not an uncommon sentiment in Mexico, so why can't we take it seriously here?... This is like a Quebec problem if France was next door to Canada.

Other Hispanic rights leaders say that Reconquista is nothing more than a fringe movement. Nativo Lopez, president of the Mexican American Political Association in Los Angeles, when asked about the concept of Reconquista by a reporter, responded, "I can't believe you're bothering me with questions about this. You're not serious. I can't believe you're bothering with such a minuscule, fringe element that has no resonance with this populace."

Reconquista sentiments are often jocularly referred to by media for Mexicans, including a recent Absolut Vodka ad that generated significant controversy in the United States for printing of a map of prewar Mexico. Reconquista is a recurring theme in contemporary fiction and nonfiction, particularly among far-right authors.

The National Council of La Raza, the largest national Hispanic civil rights and advocacy organization in the United States, stated on its website that it "has never supported and does not endorse the notion of a Reconquista (the right of Mexico to reclaim land in the southwestern United States) or Aztlán."

A 2002 Zogby poll reported that 58% of Mexicans in Mexico believed that the southwestern United States rightfully belongs to Mexico.

== Real approaches ==
=== Early 20th century ===
In 1915, the capture of Basilio Ramos, an alleged supporter of the Mexican dictator Victoriano Huerta, in Brownsville, Texas, revealed the existence of the Plan of San Diego, whose goal is often interpreted to be reconquering the Southwestern United States to gain domestic support in Mexico for Huerta. However, other theories are that the plan, which included killing all white males at least 16 years old, had been created to push the US, eventually successfully, to support the rule of Venustiano Carranza, a major leader of the Mexican Revolution. The supporters of the Plan of San Diego, referred to as the Seditionists, launched the Bandit War, a series of raids and attacks across the Mexican border. While initially clandestinely supported by the Carranza regime, once the United States officially recognized Carranza's government, Mexican governmental support for the raids ceased and the rebellion was suppressed.

In 1917, according to the intercepted Zimmermann Telegram, Germany, in exchange for Mexico joining it as an ally against the United States during World War I, was ready to assist Mexico to "reconquer" its lost territories of Texas, New Mexico, and Arizona. There is no evidence that the Mexican government ever seriously considered it. The telegram's disclosure promoted anti-Mexican sentiment and was a major factor in the US declaring war on Germany.

=== Modern ===
For Chicano nationalists in the 1960s, the term was not used, but many often felt that "Aztlán" should undergo cultural revival and expansion.

In the late 1990s to the early 2000s, as US census data showed that the population of Mexican Americans in the Southwestern United States had increased, and the term was popularized by contemporary intellectuals in Mexico, such as Carlos Fuentes, Elena Poniatowska, and President Vicente Fox, who spoke of Mexican immigrants maintaining their culture and Spanish language in the United States as they migrated in greater numbers to the area.

In March 2015, in the midst of the War in Donbas, when the US was planning on supplying lethal aid to support Ukraine in its fight against Russia, Dukuvakha Abdurakhmanov, the speaker of the Chechen Parliament, threatened to arm Mexico against the United States and questioned the legal status of the territories of California, New Mexico, Arizona, Nevada, Utah, Colorado, and Wyoming.

In June 2025, in response to the Los Angeles protests, President of the Senate (Mexico) Gerardo Fernández Noroña suggested that the whole Southwestern United States should be returned to Mexico, saying "names don't lie. The most spoken language in Los Angeles is Spanish. You don't need to speak English to be in Los Angeles." He went on to denounce the existence of the United States, and claimed that Mexicans had settled in the region long before the U.S. had achieved its independence. He also claimed that Mexico was "stripped of these territories".

== See also ==
- Battle of San Jacinto
- Treaties of Velasco
- Mexican-American War
- Treaty of Guadalupe Hidalgo
- Mexico–United States border wall
- Mexico–United States border crisis
- Provincias Internas
