= Herman Baca =

Chicano activist (born 1943)

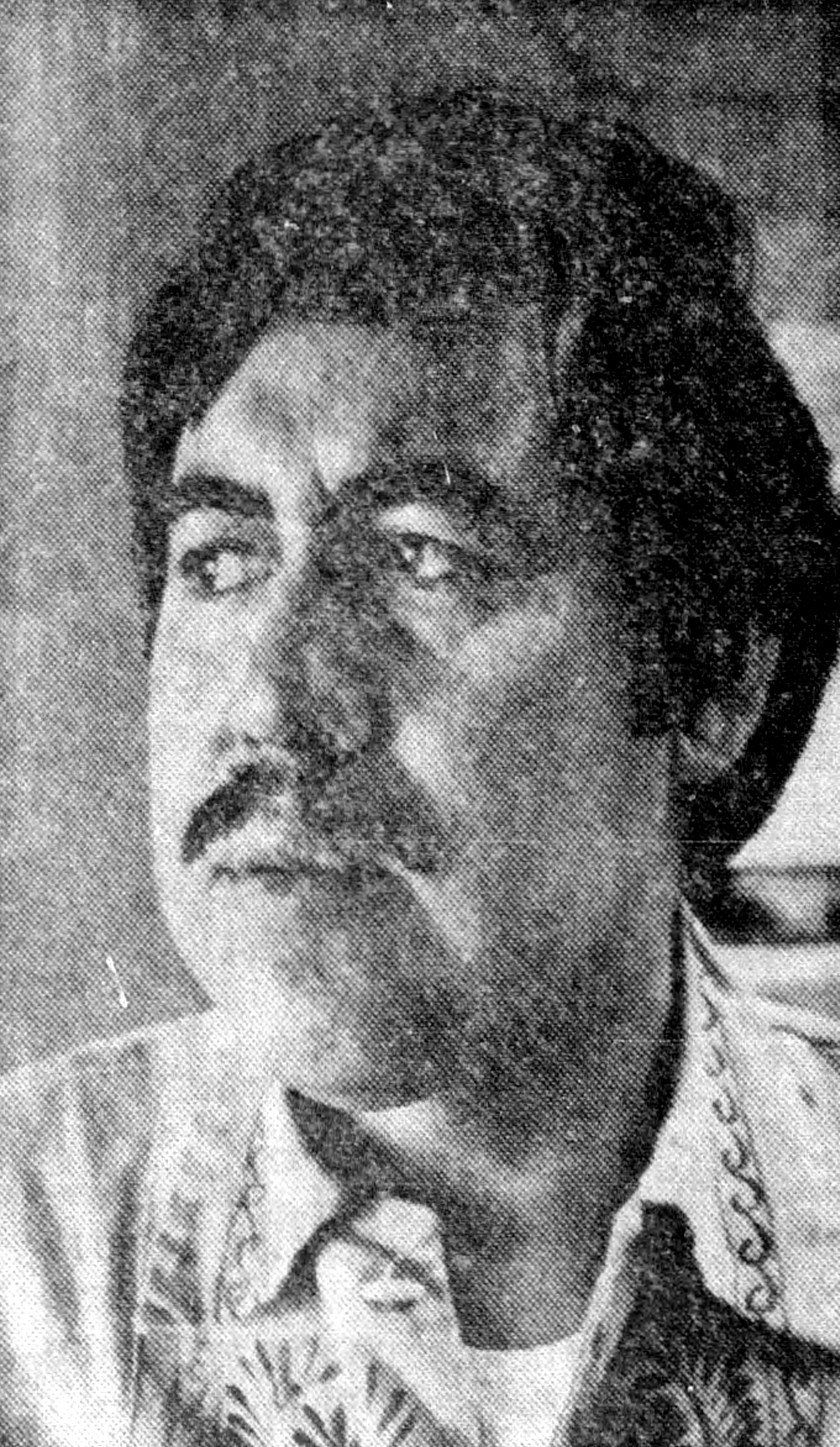
Baca c. 1980

Herman Baca (born April 5, 1943) is a Chicano activist best known for grassroots community organizing in National City, California. Mentored by labor activists Bert Corona and Soledad Alatorre, Baca focused on political empowerment, grassroots organizing, police brutality, immigration, and a number of other issues during his involvement with the Mexican American Political Association, La Raza Unida Political Party, CASA Justicia, and the Committee on Chicano Rights. He was a key figure that advocated for undocumented immigrants as a part of the "Chicano/Mexicano" community during the Chicano Civil Rights Movement since the 1960s. As part of the Chicano Movement, Baca advocated for self-determination and defending human rights through organizing protests, administering electoral registration campaigns, community-based fund raising through tardeadas, and legal defense and social service workshops. Baca is currently based in San Diego, California in San Diego County.

== Early life ==
Herman Baca was born in Los Lentes, New Mexico, an agricultural town outside of Los Lunas, to Nicholas and Eloisa Carrasco Baca on April 5, 1943. Nicholas was a World War II veteran and actively engaged in politics. He was a precinct captain for the Democratic Party and a part-time farmer. At eleven years old, the Baca family moved to National City, California where Baca would attend school in the Sweetwater Union district until graduating high school in 1961. During his high school years, Baca was president of Los Solteros, a club of bachelors from the west-side barrio in National City. Los Solteros would hang out at Bob's Coffee Shop at Seventeenth Street and National Avenue occasionally slinging a bottle across the street towards Oscar's hamburger stand where the Anglos hung out.

After high school, Baca participated in the printing trade business working in local shops until opening his own, Aztec Printing, in 1969. At the time, Baca was the only Chicano printer in San Diego County due to constant discrimination that prevented Chicanos from participating in social and economic spheres. Intending to operate the print shop as a business, Aztec Printing quickly became a hub for local organizers involved in the Chicano Movement and headquarters for the National City chapter of the Mexican American Political Association, MAPA.

== Early activism ==
Herman Baca became active at the peak of the Chicano Civil Rights Movement. In 1968, Baca volunteered as a block captain for Richard Nixon's presidential campaign. That same year, frustrated by the lack of political representation of Chicanos, Baca was drawn into the Mexican American Political Association, which at the time was focused on registering Mexican Americans to vote and educating community members about the U.S. political system. With the assistance of MAPA leaders Berto Corona, Phil Usquiano, and Abe Tapia, Baca organized MAPA's chapter in National City. Becoming critical with the Democratic Party, he continued the fight for the self-determination of Chicanos by organizing the San Diego county chapter of La Raza Unida Party in 1970. Around the same time he served as chairman of the board for programs which were part of the War on Poverty, and established CASA Justicia, a chapter of the nationawide Centro de Acción Social Autónoma (CASA) organization. CASAs organized undocumented community members, providing legal and social services, and politicized them as a part of the Chicano Movement.

=== Mexican American Political Association ===
In 1968, Baca organized the National City Chapter of the Mexican American Political Association, MAPA. He was president of MAPA-National City and served as the Southern Region director representing the counties of Imperial, Orange, Riverside, San Bernardino, and San Diego until 1974. During his time at MAPA, Baca managed various campaigns for Chicano candidates including Peter Chacon. Democratic candidate Chacon was successfully managed by Baca winning the 79th Assembly District seat of south-central San Diego in 1970. Just before the election, Baca broke ties with Chacon due to what Baca observed as a cooptation by the Democratic Party. Chacon's election became a milestone making him the first Latino elected to the 79th Assembly District and sponsored a bilingual education bill that was approved in 1976. Baca and Chacon later debated vehemently over the Dixon-Arnett bill, passed in 1971 that fined employers who hired undocumented workers. While Chacon, along with César Chavez and Dolores Huerta of the United Farm Workers union, argues that the bill protected Mexican American workers unionizing efforts, Baca along with Bert Corona and other Chicano Movement organizations argues that the bill led to discrimination against Mexican-origin workers who were interrogated by employers about their citizenship status, or were not hired.

=== La Raza Unida Party ===
Herman Baca, like many Chicanos, felt abandoned by the Democratic Party after years of having their concerns ignored. La Raza Unida political party was organized to represent the struggles of working-class Chicano communities. Originating in Crystal City in South Texas where Mexican Americans were the majority, La Raza Unida in California was a vehicle to raise political consciousness and encouraged Chicanos to become politically active as registered voters and even political candidates. Baca served as the San Diego organizer for La Raza Unida Party and as Southern California representative to the National Convention of the Mexican American third-party, starting in 1970.

=== CASA Justicia ===
Baca helped organize and served as chair of the board for the Centro de Acción Social Autónoma (Center for Autonomous Social Action), or CASA Justicia, in 1970 until 1977. CASA Justicia was a community-based social service agency for the Chicano community. Baca's activism shifted towards the undocumented population after a conversation with his political mentors, Bert Corona and Soledad Alatorres. Corona had visited Baca in his shop insisting to focus on the immigration issue. With the help of his mentors, Baca took part in educating community members and providing legal resources for undocumented members. CASA Justicia members were charged a low fee of $15 a year to receive their services. Services covered problems from education to unemployment. Accessing financial support from the Volunteers in Service to America (VISTA) program under the War on Poverty campaigning, CASA Justicia volunteers received legal aid training and represented undocumented and other immigrant clients in immigration court.

Through CASA Justicia, Baca organized many marches in protest of the mistreatment of Chicanos and undocumented people. In 1972, CASA Justicia co-organized a march of 10,000 undocumented workers in Los Angeles to protest the Dixon-Arnett bill that was passed by California State Legislature that would fine employers for knowingly hiring undocumented workers. In 1973, a 500-person picket was organized outside the San Diego County jail in protest of Sheriff Duffy's memorandum requiring taxicab drivers to report suspected undocumented passengers.

== Committee on Chicano Rights ==
In 1975, shortly after working on Peter Chacon's campaign, Baca assisted in organizing the Ad Hoc Committee on Chicano Rights, CCR, to act as an umbrella of several organizations with the mission to protect the Chicano community's human, civil, and constitutional rights. In 1975, Baca reorganized the Committee on Chicano Rights, CCR, as a non-profit organization addressing the socioeconomic conditions of Chicanos. As founding chairman of the CCR, Baca emphasized the importance of self-determination by encouraging the Chicano community in taking part of educational, community, and civic affairs. The reorganized CCR emerged in 1975 when 2,000 people protested the police killing of unarmed 20-year-old Puerto Rican, Luis "Tato" Rivera. The uproar mobilized dozens of youth activists under Baca's leadership in 1975 struggle against the National City police department, whose officer, Craig Short, shot and killed Rivera. When the National City council and area courts failed to hold the department and Short accountable, the CCR, in coalition with other activist organizations including Black Power group Nia, led an unsuccessful campaign to recall several members of the city council.

Baca organized many public demonstrations against the abuse and discrimination of Chicanos and undocumented people. In 1977, CCR organized a unity march of 10,000 people protesting the KKK's planned apprehensions of undocumented Mexicans at the U.S.-Mexico border. The CCR also led several protests against President Jimmy Carter's plan to increase the number of Border Patrol agents, reinstate a temporary workers program, and build a wall at major crossing areas at the U.S.-Mexico border including Tijuana-San Ysidro near Baca's community. This culminated in the 1980 Chicano National Conference on Immigration where over 1,000 Chicano, Latino, and immigrant rights activists from across the U.S. gathered to deliberate on the violent results of immigration policies, policing, and hysteria. The conference produced a number of resolutions including a call for the abolishment of the Immigration and Naturalization Service (INS) and U.S. Border Patrol, unlimited quotas for migrants coming from countries the U.S. had imperialist policies against, and rights for Mexicans to freely cross the U.S.-Mexico border based on their extensive labor contributions to U.S. society and the terms of the 1848 Treaty of Guadalupe Hidalgo with Mexico. In 1981, the Chicano National Immigration Conference Tribunal took place in San Diego to document the violence against Chicanos/Mexicanos/Latinos as a result of the militarization of immigration policies. As a result, a 1,000-page document was sent to the President of Mexico, Portillo, and President Reagan documenting over 60 cases of violence. A couple years later, the "17 Mile Walk for Rights" was organized from San Diego to the U.S.-Mexico border of 3,000 people in protests of the Simpson-Mazzolli immigration bill. Baca remained active throughout the years with the CCR standing up for the Chicano community.

== See also ==
- List of civil rights leaders
- History of Mexican Americans
