= Centro de Acción Social Autónomo =

Chicano organization (1969–1979)

- Abbreviation: CASA
- Formation: 1969
- Founders: Bert Corona, Soledad "Chole" Alatorre, Francisco Amaro, María Cedillos, Juan Mariscal, Rafael Zacarías
- Dissolved: August 1979
- Type: Immigrant rights advocacy, social services, political organization
- Headquarters: Los Angeles, California, U.S.
- Region served: California (Los Angeles, San Diego, Oakland, San Jose); Greeley, Colorado; El Paso, Texas; Chicago, Illinois
- Publication: Sin Fronteras

The Centro de Acción Social Autónomo (CASA; Spanish for Center for Autonomous Social Action) was a prominent Chicano organization that focused on the rights of immigrants, particularly those from Mexico, during the late 1960s and 1970s. Founded in Los Angeles in 1969 by veteran labor activists Bert Corona and Soledad "Chole" Alatorre, CASA initially functioned as a mutualista-style social service organization, providing legal and social assistance to undocumented workers and their families.

As it grew, CASA developed a sophisticated political ideology that challenged mainstream American and Chicano views on immigration. Arguing that Mexican immigrants and Mexican Americans were a single, transnational community—"Somos Un Pueblo Sin Fronteras" (We Are One People without Borders)—CASA advocated for the rights of all workers regardless of citizenship status. It provided essential services, from legal aid to English classes, while also engaging in political mobilization against restrictive immigration policies and what it saw as a system of labor exploitation.

In the mid-1970s, the organization underwent a significant ideological shift after a new, younger leadership took control. It moved from a service-based model to a more explicitly Marxist–Leninist "revolutionary vanguard" structure, emphasizing political education over direct assistance. This change led to internal conflicts, a sharp decline in its working-class membership base, and splits within its network of chapters, including the one in San Diego. Despite its eventual dissolution in 1979, CASA played a crucial role in forcing the Chicano movement to address the issue of immigration, developed a lasting critique of U.S. immigration policy, and influenced a generation of activists who continued to work in immigrant rights.

== Founding and early years ==
The Centro de Acción Social Autónomo–Hermandad General de Trabajadores (CASA) was founded in 1969 in Los Angeles as a mutual-aid society for Mexican artisans and laborers. Its founders included the veteran labor activists Bert Corona and Soledad "Chole" Alatorre, along with Francisco Amaro, María Cedillos, Juan Mariscal, and Rafael Zacarías. The organization emerged from the tradition of Mexican mutualistas (mutual aid societies) and was an extension of the work of La Hermandad Mexicana Nacional, which had been active in advocating for immigrant workers since the 1950s.

CASA's initial purpose was to provide direct assistance to the growing population of undocumented workers and their families. The organization offered social and legal services, including help with housing, employment, and residency applications, as well as classes in English, self-defense, and first-aid. It also provided cultural reinforcement through courses on Mexican history, ballet folklórico, and guitar. Mexican immigrants joined in large numbers to take advantage of these services, and by 1973, CASA claimed a membership of four thousand.

CASA quickly expanded, establishing chapters in other California cities like Oakland and San Jose, as well as in other states, including Greeley, Colorado, El Paso, Texas, and Chicago, Illinois. In 1970, a particularly active chapter, CASA Justicia, was founded in National City, a working-class suburb of San Diego. This chapter emerged from the local Mexican American Political Association (MAPA) and was established with the encouragement of Corona and Alatorre. Organizers like Herman Baca and Carlos "Charlie" Vásquez used the resources of the VISTA program to train volunteers and provide legal counsel to the undocumented community. In a unique tactic, CASA Justicia issued its own "green cards" to members, which, although not legally valid, provided a sense of legitimacy and a point of contact if they were detained by immigration authorities. The San Diego office became a crucial site for understanding the day-to-day realities of life on the U.S.–Mexico border and the challenges faced by transnational families.

== Ideology and political action ==
From its inception, CASA's political philosophy was distinct from most other Chicano organizations, which tended to focus on the rights of U.S. citizens. CASA's central ideological tenet was encapsulated in its slogan, "Somos Un Pueblo Sin Fronteras" (We Are One People without Borders), which asserted that Mexican Americans and Mexican immigrants constituted a single, transnational working-class community. The organization argued that the exploitation of undocumented workers was an inherent feature of American capitalism and that the distinction between "legal" and "illegal" residents was a tool used to divide the working class.

CASA maintained that Mexican immigrant workers, through their labor and sacrifices, had earned the right to live and work in the United States, regardless of their formal citizenship status. In a 1971 speech, Bert Corona rejected the notion that undocumented workers were a threat to Mexican Americans, and the idea that the true source of their community's problems was "not the capitalist system, not the corporations, not the bad wages, not discrimination, not exploitation ... [but] our carnales [brothers and sisters], who in their poverty come from Mexico to find work". This perspective framed the issue not as one of illegal immigration but of labor exploitation.

The organization's activism was grounded in this ideology. In 1973, CASA helped establish the National Coalition for Fair Immigration Laws and Practices, a broad alliance of labor and community groups that advocated for immigrant rights. CASA was a vocal opponent of legislative proposals that sought to punish employers for hiring undocumented workers, such as the Dixon Arnett Bill in California and the federal Rodino Bill, arguing that such laws would inevitably lead to increased discrimination against all "Mexican-looking" people.

== The Los Tres case and radicalization ==
CASA's transformation from a service-oriented organization to a more explicitly radical one was heavily influenced by the legal case of "Los Tres" (The Three). The three men—Alberto Ortiz, Juan Fernández, and Rodolfo Sánchez—were members of a community group called the Casa de Carnalismo (House of Brotherhood) in the Pico Gardens Housing Project of Los Angeles. As former gang members, they were committed to an anti-drug campaign and would confront local dealers, ordering them to stop selling in the neighborhood.

On July 22, 1971, the three men confronted a man they believed to be a heroin dealer, Bobby Parker. Parker, however, was actually Robert E. Canales, an undercover agent for the U.S. Bureau of Narcotics and Dangerous Drugs. A shootout ensued, during which Canales was shot and partially paralyzed. Ortiz, Fernández, and Sánchez were arrested and charged with federal crimes, including assault and robbery of a federal agent. The case immediately became a cause célèbre, and Los Tres were viewed as community activists being unjustly prosecuted by the U.S. government. A defense committee was formed to raise funds and support them through a lengthy legal process. In January 1972, the three men were convicted and received long prison sentences.

=== The Comité and sterilization campaign ===
The arrest and sentencing of Los Tres angered a group of young, Marxist-leaning activists, who in 1974 broke away from the main defense committee to form the more radical "Committee to Free Los Tres" (the Comité). This new group argued that the drug trade was a tool of U.S. imperialism designed to control and suppress minority communities. To build support, the Comité expanded its focus to other issues, most notably the campaign against forced sterilizations.

The Comité established the "Los Angeles Committee to Stop Forced Sterilizations" to address what it called a "hot-button issue" in the community. The campaign focused on allegations that doctors at the Los Angeles County–University of Southern California Medical Center were coercing Asian, Black, and Latina women into consenting to sterilization procedures while they were in labor or the delivery room, and thus unable to make an informed decision. Since these procedures were subsidized by the U.S. Department of Health, Education and Welfare, the Comité framed the practice as a violation of the rights of Latinos and working-class people by an "imperialist nation".

== Shift to Marxism and internal conflict ==
In 1974, the younger, more radical student activists from Comité proposed a merger with CASA and gained control of the organization's leadership from the veteran founders. This new leadership sought to move CASA from a social service model to what they termed a "revolutionary vanguard", dedicated to the political education of the working class based on Marxism–Leninism. The focus shifted from providing direct services to organizing ideological study circles and creating a "disciplined National organization".

This ideological shift caused a "major break" within the organization and led to the resignation of Corona and Alatorre. Corona later criticized the new leadership for "putting the cart before the horse", arguing that they were "trying to substitute the vanguard for the working-class base" and creating a "vanguard without a 'guard'—without a base!"

The conflict was particularly acute in San Diego. The service-oriented CASA Justicia found itself at odds with a new, student-led faction called "CASA San Diego". This new group, allied with the national leadership in Los Angeles, accused the CASA Justicia leaders of being undemocratic and focusing too much on social services rather than the "class struggle". In 1975, the national organization formally severed ties with CASA Justicia, citing its "anti-democratic" practices. The new CASA San Diego, however, struggled to gain a foothold in the community, as its focus on ideological purity proved less appealing to local workers and immigrants than the practical services CASA Justicia had offered.

The national organization adopted a highly bureaucratic structure, outlined in a rule book called the Reglamento, which established a hierarchy of membership and a centralized committee system to ensure ideological purity. This structure, combined with its increasingly sectarian ideology, led to further conflicts, including with the Maoist-leaning August Twenty-Ninth Movement (ATM), which held a different view on Chicano national identity.

== Decline and legacy ==
The ideological and structural changes of the mid-1970s ultimately led to CASA's decline. The shift away from providing direct social services alienated much of its original working-class and immigrant base. Membership plummeted from a high of 4,000 in 1973 to just 300 registered members by the late 1970s. The organization became consumed by internal bickering, with factions engaging in intense "self-criticism" sessions to determine who was ideologically correct. CASA's resources were also strained by its broad international focus, which included outreach to socialist movements in Cuba and Puerto Rico, and by persistent surveillance and infiltration by the Federal Bureau of Investigation (FBI).

In 1978, an internal Evaluation Task Force concluded that CASA had never been a true "revolutionary organization" but had only adopted the external forms of Marxism–Leninism. This report accelerated the group's disintegration. The final issue of its newspaper, Sin Fronteras, was published in July 1978, and CASA held its last meeting in August 1979.

Despite its eventual collapse, CASA left a significant legacy. It was the first major Chicano-era organization to systematically address the issue of immigration and to advocate for the rights of undocumented workers. It successfully challenged both mainstream American society and other Chicano groups to recognize the transnational nature of the Mexican-origin community and to see immigrants not as a problem but as an integral part of the working class. Many of CASA's former members and leaders, including Corona and Alatorre, continued to be influential figures in the labor and immigrant rights movements for decades. Its history remains a key case study in the possibilities and challenges of radical, transnational political organizing in the United States.

== See also ==
- Mexican American Political Association
- La Raza Unida Party
