= Landaverde =

Landaverde is a Spanish surname of Basque origin. Notable people with the surname include:

- Bryan Landaverde (born 1995), Salvadoran footballer
- Gladys Landaverde (born 1990), Salvadoran middle-distance runner
- Jorge Suárez Landaverde (1945–1997), Salvadoran footballer
- José S. Landaverde (born 1971), Salvadoran community organizer, activist and priest
- Karen Elizabeth Landaverde (born 1991), Salvadoran footballer
