= Elvira Arellano =

Mexican-born immigration activist

- Born: San Miguel Curahuango, Michoacán, 1975
- Occupation: Human Rights Activist

Elvira Arellano (born at San Miguel Curahuango, Michoacán, 1975) is an international activist who works to defend the human rights of immigrants living in the U.S. without legal authorization (often referred to as "illegal" immigrants).

Elvira Arellano was living in Chicago when she was arrested by immigration agents in 2002 for working without authorization at O'Hare International Airport. In 2001, she co-founded La Familia Latina Unida (the United Latino Family) as an expansion of the Methodist group Pueblo Sin Fronteras (People Without Borders), a movement fighting for the rights of unauthorized immigrant families to stay together, and in May 2006, she and an activist Flor Crisostomo carried out a three-week hunger strike against deportation.

Arellano gained national fame when she took sanctuary in a Chicago church in August 2006, in an effort to avoid being deported away from her U.S.-born son Saul. Her action inspired churches around the U.S. to launch a new sanctuary movement to defend immigrants and end deportations. Time magazine included her among "People Who Mattered" in its "Person of the Year" issue in December 2006. A year after she entered sanctuary, Elvira Arellano was arrested by ICE (Immigration and Customs Enforcement) agents during a visit to Los Angeles, where she went to speak at the church Our Lady Queen of Angels. She was deported on August 20, 2007.

Her son Saul remained in the U.S., but visited her in Mexico.

Elvira Arellano continued her activism for migrant rights in the Mexican state of Michoacan with La Familia Latina Unida - Sin Fronteras (Latina Family United - Without Borders), supporting families divided by U.S. deportations, and Central American immigrants detained or affected by the violence in Mexico.

On March 18, 2014, Arellano presented herself to U.S. Border Patrol officials at the Otay Mesa border crossing in San Diego, California, and requested asylum in the United States. She has lived in Chicago since then, continuing her human rights defense work while pressing her case for asylum.

== History ==
Arellano entered the United States without authorization in 1997 and was apprehended and deported back to Mexico by the United States government. She returned within days, again without authorization, and lived for three years in Oregon. In 1999, she gave birth to a son, Saul Arellano. She never disclosed who Saul's father was. Saul is a United States citizen. In 2000, Arellano moved to Chicago and worked doing cleaning at O'Hare International Airport. In 2002, following a post-September 11 security sweep, she was arrested and convicted for working under a false Social Security number. Arellano was ordered to appear before immigration authorities on August 15, 2006. On that date she took refuge in the Adalberto United Methodist church in the Humboldt Park area of Chicago. Before that, she sought safe haven for a year in Amor De Dios United Methodist Church with Pastor José S. Landaverde, who began the new immigrant sanctuary movement in Illinois.

On November 14, 2006, in Mexico City, Saul Arellano appeared before the Congress of Mexico. The Mexican lawmakers passed a resolution to urge the United States government to suspend the deportation of Arellano and other parents of children who are United States citizens.

She was arrested on August 19, 2007 in Los Angeles. Within hours of her arrest Arellano was repatriated to Mexico by U.S. federal agents in compliance with an existing deportation order. She was accompanied to the Mexican border by an official of the Mexican consulate in San Diego, California, as well as by agents of the U.S. government.

On August 29, 2007, Elvira Arellano asked Mexican President Felipe Calderon to request the U.S. government for a special visa to visit her son, and called for assistance to the 600,000 Mexican mothers who are in similar circumstances, as well as the 12 million undocumented immigrants in the U.S.

On February 9, 2008, Elvira Arellano was denied entry into Canada where she was scheduled to arrive in Vancouver to speak at a public forum on Sanctuary and Migrant Justice on Sunday Feb 10th and to join the U.S.-based Marcha Migrante on February 12 at the border.

== Impact ==
Arellano says that she should not have to choose between leaving her US citizen child in the U.S. or taking him to Mexico. Critics of Arellano counter that she is exploiting her son in order to remain in the United States. Latino advocates have highlighted this case as one of civil rights. Arellano's claim of a "right of sanctuary" and a claim to stay in the United States has been taken up by Latino advocate groups such as National Alliance for Immigrants' Rights, NCLR, LULAC, among others. In support, La Placita, a historic Los Angeles church, declared itself a sanctuary for any undocumented immigrant facing deportation, something it did during the 1980s for the first refugees from war-ridden Guatemala and El Salvador who escaped to California.

The U.S. government's position is that Arellano is free to take Saul with her to Mexico in order to keep her family together. Prior to Arellano's deportation, the U.S. government also noted that there is no claim to sanctuary in a church under U.S. law.

Upon her return to Mexico Arellano stated that "the United States is the one who broke the law first. By letting people cross over [the border] without documents. By letting people pay taxes. . . ." These comments led to criticism because this statement is very similar to those made by anti-immigration groups in the United States.

On May 3, 2007, Rep. Bobby Rush (D-IL) introduced H.R. 2182 which would grant legal immigrant status, with the possibility of applying for permanent residence status, to Arellano as well as 33 other people. The bill was referred to the House Committee on the Judiciary and (as of August 2007) had not moved out of committee for further consideration. However, once Congress adjourns any bills not acted upon or signed into law are moot.

== See also ==
- Illegal immigration to the United States
- Mexican American
- Birthright citizenship in the United States of America
