= List of Mexican-American political organizations =

Among the various Mexican or Mexican-American political groups are:

- The National Association of Latino Elected and Appointed Officials (NALEO) is a 501(c)(4) nonpartisan membership organization whose constituency includes the nation’s more than 6,000 elected and appointed Latino officials. www.naleo.org
- Founded in 1973, the Mexican American Legislative Caucus (MALC) is a 501(c)(6) non-profit, non-partisan organization composed of members of the Texas House of Representatives committed to addressing the issues that Latinos face across the state. www.malc.org
- Founded in 1967, the Brown Berets emerged during the Chicano movement as a pro-Chicano paramilitary organization.
- The Congressional Hispanic Caucus (CHC) is made up of 21 Democratic Members of the United States Congress of Hispanic descent. The Caucus is dedicated to voicing and advancing, through the legislative process, issues affecting Hispanics in the United States and Puerto Rico. The CHC was founded in December 1976 as a legislative service organization of the United States House of Representatives. Today, the CHC is organized as a Congressional Member organization, governed under the Rules of the U.S. House of Representatives.
- Centro de Acción Social Autónomo is an organization established in Los Angeles in 1968 by immigrant and Chicano/a workers. CASA focuses on helping out immigrants and Chicano communities for equal rights.
- The Congressional Hispanic Caucus Institute (CHCI) is a nonprofit and nonpartisan leadership development organization established in 1978. CHCI's website provides a historical timeline of the institute's evolution since its creation by four members of the U.S. House of Representatives: Edward Roybal, E. “Kika” de la Garza, Robert “Bobby” Garcia (PR), and Baltasar Corrada.
- LULAC The League of United Latin American Citizens (LULAC) is a political advocacy group for Latinos in the United States. Founded in 1929 in Corpus Christi, Texas, LULAC is the nation's oldest Hispanic organization. According to its website as of October 2020, LULAC has "approximately 132,000 members throughout the United States and Puerto Rico," which it claims also makes it the nation's largest Hispanic organization.
- UnidosUs, formerly known as the National Council of La Raza (NCLR), is a non-profit, and non-partisan political advocacy group in the United States. Its focus is on reducing poverty and discrimination, and improving opportunities for Hispanics. According to the organization's website, it is "the largest constituency-based national Hispanic organization, serving all Hispanic nationality groups in all regions".
- The Mexican American Political Association (MAPA), founded in Fresno, California in 1960, has been, and is, dedicated to the constitutional and democratic principle of political freedom and representation for the Mexican and Hispanic people of the United States of America.
- MEChA (Spanish: Movimiento Estudiantil Chicano de Aztlán, "Chicano Student Movement of Aztlán) is a Chicano organization that seeks to promote Chicano unity and empowerment through education and political action. The acronym of the organization's name is the Spanish word mecha, which means "fuse." The motto of MEChA is La Unión Hace La Fuerza ("Unity Creates Strength").
- The Comisión Femenil Mexicana Nacional (National Mexican Women's Commission, abbreviated as CFMN), is a Chicano organization geared towards the political and economic empowerment of Hispanic women, particularly Chicanas, in the United States.
- National Association of Latino Elected and Appointed Officials (NALEO) was founded in 1976[1] by Edward R. Roybal as a non-profit organization, and created an educational fund that aims to empower Latinos to participate fully in the American political process, from citizenship to public service. Its current executive director is Arturo Vargas.
