= National Alliance for Immigrants' Rights =

The National Alliance for Immigrants' Rights is an organization advocating legal status for all illegal immigrant workers in the United States pending Congressional enactment of a comprehensive immigration reform. It was founded in a conference held in Chicago on August 11–13, 2006, attended by about 700 people, most of whom had been involved in the Great American Boycott earlier in 2006.

The National Alliance for Immigrants Rights was also a series of coordinated local actions. The first local actions took place in Labor Day. The protests pressure the congress in order to enact an immigration reform. The results were to reach a compromise which was later denied by the Republican House leadership due to the repressive form of writing the reform.

== History ==
Before the Great American Boycott in 2006, there were many protests that targeting a punitive bill that was passed by the United States House of Representative in December 2005. This bill gave the illegal immigrant a label being "aggravated felons". This criminalized and dehumanized the undocumented immigrants. This sparked the spread of the immigrant rights movement which was followed by march protests in 2006. These protestors demanded justice for immigrant workers working in extreme measures and supported legislation allowing undocumented immigrants the opportunity to regulate their immigration status.

== Great American Boycott ==
The Great American Boycott became an iconic protest that urges illegal immigrant and supporter to stay at home to protest the businesses across American on May 1, 2006. It became one of the biggest US protests in history against the reinforced immigration laws. Most of these protestors were Latino immigrants, documented and undocumented immigrants, children and agricultural workers. This became the Great American Boycott of 2006. Friedman, an author of the book Consumer Boycotts expresses his emotions towards the American Boycott. The real purpose of the "Great American Boycott" is not to squeeze the U.S. economy, Friedman said, but "it's really a day to call attention to ... some of the concerns that immigrants have had over the years."

== Frame Resonance & Deprivation Theory ==
Frame resonance is also something that needed to be taken into consideration when leading this social movement. Frame resonance is the ability of a collective action frame to resonate or appeal to a targeted audience, which is an important tool when social movements intersect and do not want to be perceived as having undesirable notions. Irene Bloemraad, Fabiana Silva, and Kim Voss (2016) explain with the 2006 immigration rallies, saying, "Indeed, opponents of the 2006 immigration rallies sought to portray protestors as anti-American, criticizing the display of "foreign" flags by marchers and underscoring nationality-based us/them distinctions". A suggested replacement term for future protests may include human rights, for example, because this offers an alternative framing, bringing moral values rather than appearing "anti-American".

== Nativo Lopez-Vigil ==
Nativo Lopez-Vigil is the president of the Mexican American Political Association and leader of the National Alliance movement in Los Angeles. He led the organization of the 2006 United States Immigration Reform Protest on March 25, 2006, in Los Angeles and the Great American Boycott on May 1, 2006, in Los Angeles.

== See also ==
- Nativo Lopez
- Activism
- 2006 United States immigration reform protests
- Mexican-American
- Grassroots
