= Viva Kennedy Campaign =

1960s Mexican-American political campaign

The Viva Kennedy Campaign was a Mexican-American outreach program run by the presidential campaign of Senator John F. Kennedy from 1959 to 1963. The campaign functioned in the format of clubs networked across the Southwest, working to register Latino voters and increase the Latino turnout for Kennedy in the 1960 Presidential election against Richard Nixon.

== History ==
In the 1960s, there were thousands of potential Mexican-American voters across the US, but poll taxes were so expensive that many low income Mexican Americans could not afford to vote. Additionally, many believe that the selections of candidates came off as too conservative or racist, which turned Mexican-American voters away. Professor Ignacio M. Garcia believes that many Mexican-American veterans who served in World War II and the Korean War expected to be more openly accepted in society but faced discrimination. This discrimination pushed many veterans to fight for change. Mexican-American physician and army veteran Dr. Héctor P. García had founded a civil rights group called the American GI Forum (AGIF) in Texas and several other states. These forums later connected with and served as both an example and a vehicle for Viva Kennedy clubs. In 1960, campaign worker Carlos McCormick convinced Senator Kennedy to form a Latino outreach program to tap into the frequently overlooked Mexican-American voting population in the Southwest. An entry-level staffer in JFK's office, Carlos McCormick, was half Irish American and half Mexican American University of Arizona student, began an organization to help JFK get Mexican-American votes. Carlos McCormick married Mercy Estrada, whose father Ralph Estrada was as attorney and member of several Arizona Mexican-American organizations. Estrada helped McCormick get into political work, and McCormick went to Washington DC. In 1960, McCormick volunteered to translate Kennedy's Spanish press clippings. Kennedy discovered McCormick had close relations with AGIF and hired him. McCormick told Kennedy about the Mexican-American activist groups in the Southwest and convinced him that it was worth it to aim for the Latino vote. Kennedy assigned McCormick the task of organizing a Mexican-American outreach organization, and Viva Kennedy clubs were born. McCormick sought allies in AGIF, the Alianza Hispana-Americana, the League of United Latin American Citizens (LULAC), MAPA, and the CSO. McCormick and Kennedy were of the mindset that the Latino population had a significant enough number of voters to sway the 1960 Democratic convention vote and 1960 presidential election. The campaign was predominantly based in the Southwest in Texas, Arizona, and Southern California. Viva Kennedy clubs planned and funded their own events. The Viva Kennedy campaign served to gain JFK a lot of votes and many believe that this campaign set the tone for a positive relationship between the Democratic Party and Latinos in the US. After his election, Kennedy sent telegrams to the Viva Kennedy leaders, saying it had made a considerable contribution to his Texas victory, and thanked them for their hard work. However, many Mexican-Americans found themselves very disappointed by Kennedy by his third year in office. Many believed Kennedy would put Latinos in important positions of power and were very unhappy when he did not move in that direction. Throughout the movement, there were several prominent members that helped push the Viva Kennedy Campaign. McCormick became titled the executive director of the Viva Kennedy clubs. McCormick recruited Latino elected officials; Dennis Chávez, a senator from New Mexico; Henry B. González, a state senator in Texas; and Edward R. Roybal, a Los Angeles councilmember; to become national cochairs of the Viva Kennedy clubs.

== Aspects of public outreach ==
Throughout the Viva Kennedy Campaign, there were several approaches taken to reaching out to Latino community. John F. Kennedy went as far as to bring up the injustices against Puerto Ricans and Mexican Americans in the first televised presidential debate against Richard Nixon. Additionally, John F. Kennedy's wife, Jacqueline Kennedy Onassis, spoke Spanish and created campaign commercials in Spanish for her husband to help reach out to Spanish-speaking voters.

== Goals ==
The Viva Kennedy clubs sought to register Mexican Americans to vote, deliver a pro-Kennedy message across the Southwest, raise the profile of Mexican-American voters, show the media that Mexican Americans are an important voting group in the November 1960 election, and, most importantly, gain the Mexican-American vote for Kennedy in the 1960 election. Many Hispanics supported Kennedy because the Democratic national convention of 1960 endorsed school desegregation, fair housing, equal opportunity, civil rights, and voting rights.

Carlos McCormick utilized similarities between Kennedy's Catholicism, war hero status, large family, and Spanish-speaking wife to appeal to Mexican customs such as large patriarchal families and Catholicism in order to gain new members. The Viva Kennedy Campaign had many significant effects on later politics in the US. Garcia said the Viva Kennedy clubs, "were probably the last time an ethnic constituency operated totally independently of one of the major parties. No memos, no talking points, no directives."

According to Professor Max Krochmal from Texas Christian University, the lasting effect of the Viva Kennedy Campaign is that many politicians realized they could no longer take the Mexican-American vote for granted. Krochmal also believes an effect of the Viva Kennedy Campaign in the 1960s is that Mexican Americans produced a sense of unity that they had not experienced before. National Public Radio (NPR) asserts that a lasting effect of the Viva Kennedy Campaign is a longstanding relationship between Mexican Americans and Democrats. Additionally, this campaign's success influenced later presidential campaigns such as George H. W. Bush and Bill Clinton to reach out to the Latino community in the US as a means of gaining voter support.

Additionally, as a result of the Viva Kennedy Campaign, the Political Association of Spanish-Speaking Organizations (PASSO) was formed to help Mexican Americans to become more politically active.

While the movement started as a Viva Kennedy Campaign, it later was known by some as the Viva Kennedy–Viva Johnson Campaign since Lyndon B. Johnson was Kennedy's running partner. However, when Johnson ran for president in 1964, he formed the Viva Johnson Campaign modeled after the Viva Kennedy Campaign to reach the Hispanic community and gain their vote. Johnson had a complex relationship with the Hispanic community, especially after Kennedy reached out to the Hispanic community and then failed to fulfill their desires once in office. Johnson was able to win the votes and support of many Mexican Americans, but some felt as though he was using them as a political tool and strongly opposed him.

Nixon chose not to make an effort to reach out to the Hispanic community during his campaign for the 1960 presidency. Many believe that, after he lost to Kennedy, he realized this lack of outreach was a fatal mistake on his part. According to Cristina Mora, Nixon and a man named Henry Ramirez led an effort similar to the Viva Kennedy Campaign in 1968, similarly known as "Viva Nixon" thanks to its similarities to Kennedy's campaign. He later moved on to create a more successful effort in both 1971 and 1972, headed by Ramirez. This effort included the Cabinet Committee on Opportunities for Spanish Speaking People, which was headed by Ramirez. Nixon's efforts to reach out to the Hispanic community served as one of the first and only times that the Republican party has made an effort to reach out to the Spanish-speaking demographic.
