= José S. Landaverde =

American activist

José Sigfredo Landaverde
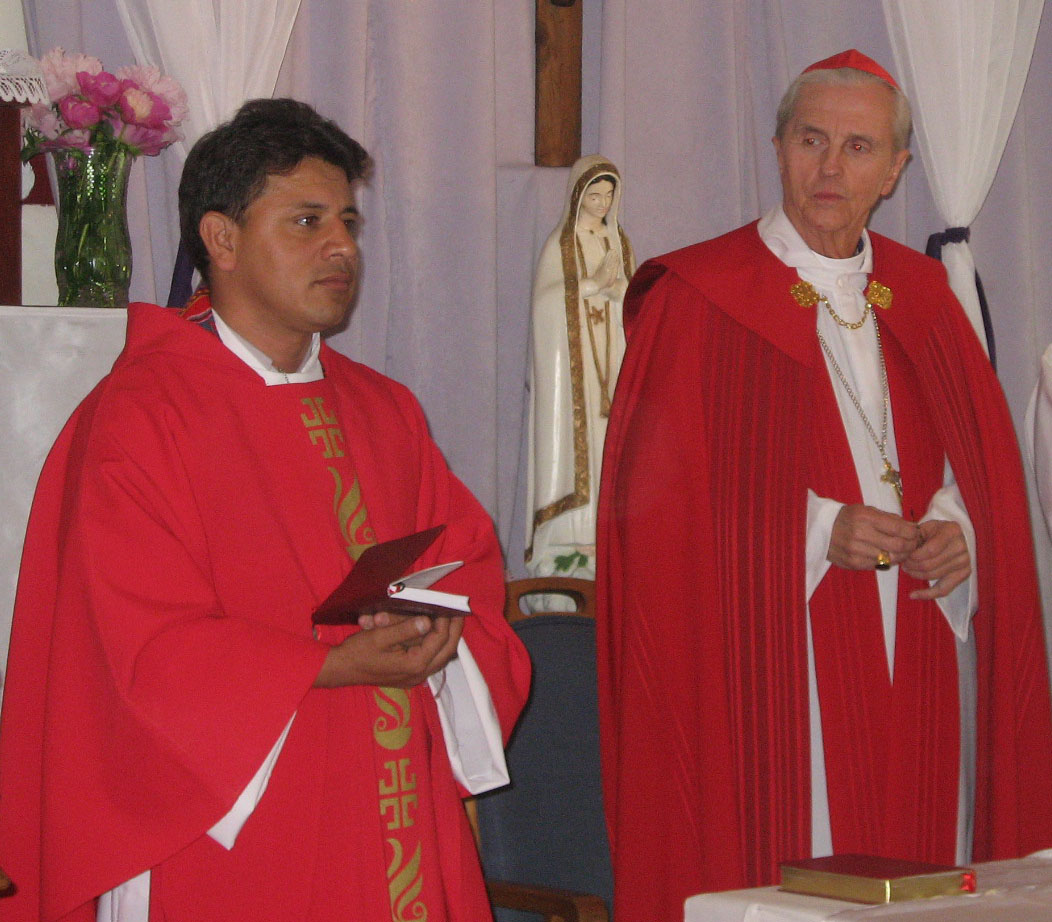
- Landaverde (left) in 2007
- Born: La Reina, Chalatenango, El Salvador
- Died: 12/11/2022
- Occupations: Community organizer, activist and priest; former pastor

José Sigfredo Landaverde was a community organizer, activist, and priest at Our Lady of Guadalupe Anglican Church, located in the largely Mexican neighborhood of Little Village in South Side Chicago. He was also a former executive director of the Latino Union.

== Early life ==
Landaverde was born into a poor family in La Reina, Chalatenango, El Salvador. He was forced into the jungle to join Farabundo Marti National Liberation Front guerrilla. At 17, he was arrested by the military and severely beaten for organizing among the poor. He fled to Guatemala, Mexico, and ultimately, the United States, where he was given status as a political refugee.

Upon seeing what he perceived as injustices perpetuated against Latinos in the United States, particularly undocumented immigrants, day laborers, and those working in temporary agencies, he began working with grassroots organizations to reach out to the exploited community. His leadership led him to co-found the Latino Union in May 2000 in Chicago, Illinois.

== Education ==
Influenced by the role of his mother as a catechist, and inspired by the martyrdom of Archbishop Óscar Arnulfo Romero, Landaverde studied at Catholic Theological Union, and later in Garrett-Evangelical Theological Seminary, obtaining his master's in Divinity.

== Pastorship ==
As he was obtaining his master's, the Northern Illinois Conference of the United Methodist Church appointed him as a pastor in Amor De Dios United Methodist Church in July 2003. One of Landaverde's main goals was to promote ecumenicism by merging the gap between the Roman Catholicism of Little Village and Protestantism, inspired by the example of John Wesley, the founder of United Methodism.

One of his most controversial strategies was introducing an icon of the Virgin of Guadalupe, a national symbol of patriotism and faith in Mexico. Within the Methodist Church there was support, but also great opposition that sparked headlines in newspapers and magazines such as Time. Thinking of Mary as the first disciple of Jesus and keeping in mind Wesley's view of her as a "pure and unspotted virgin", Landaverde ignored the cries of conservative Methodists. The practice was eventually approved by Superintendent Donald F. Guest, but was still frowned upon by many.

Amor De Dios United Methodist Church at the time of his ministry continued financially unstable, at times encouraging Landaverde to donate his paycheck to the church treasury. He expressed discontent toward the Conference, feeling that it left poor churches even more economically vulnerable. His frustration peaked at the criticism displayed by conservative Methodists who insisted that his theology was too "radical," or, conversely, Roman Catholic. The lack of support and resources from the Church inhibited many of his grassroots projects. Finally, in 2006 he retired from his position in the Methodist Church, leaving a trusted lay member, Ramiro Rodríguez, in charge.

== Priesthood ==
Landaverde transferred to the Diocese of Quincy of the Anglican Church of North America that same year, but his license was later revoked because of disagreements about church polity and morality. In the summer of 2007, he opened up a closed bar in Little Village and remodeled it to become a Spanish-speaking Anglican Catholic mission in Illinois.

== Work ==
Landaverde was known for his grassroots organizing, particularly concerning immigrants' and workers' rights, being the first to popularize the new sanctuary movement in Illinois. He housed immigrants in danger of deportation, most notably Elvira Arellano in 2004, before she took refuge in Adalberto United Methodist church in Humboldt Park in August 2006. He worked with the day laborers of Home Depot and sent truckloads of provisions to New Orleans in 2005 and donated toys and supplies to Tabasco, México in Christmas of 2007.
