= Soledad Alatorre =

Mexican labor activist (1927–2020)

- Born: 1927; San Luis Potosi, Mexico
- Died: March 25, 2020; San Luis Potosi, Mexico
- Other names: Chole Alatorre
- Known for: Labor activist

Soledad "Chole" Alatorre (1927 – March 25, 2020) was a Chicana labor activist who was active in the Greater Los Angeles Area, and was known for her work with the Centro de Acción Social Autónomo (CASA) and for her advocacy of civil rights among the Chicano community.

== Personal life ==
Alatorre was born in the state of San Luis Potosi in Mexico, in 1927, into a large family with many women. Her father was an officer in the union of railway workers. Alatorre married into a wealthy family when she was 19. Along with her husband and her sister, she migrated to the United States and moved to the Greater Los Angeles Area when she was 27 years old. In California her husband did not get the job he had moved for. There she began work as a model for bathing suits, for a factory which made pieces for Rosemary Reid. She also worked as a supervisor in the same factory, and her husband worked in the garment industry as well. She separated from her husband in the late 1950s, and never had any children: she spent most of her time with her work in labor organizing. She lived with her sisters, who also worked with her. The city of Pacoima was her home for over fifty years, until she moved back to San Luis Potosí two years before her death. She died in March 2020; the causes of her death were unknown.

== Labor organizing ==
Alatorre's father had raised her on stories of labor activism, and she was radicalized by the plight of migrant workers that she observed when traveling to the United States. Her work in the clothes-manufacturing company led Alatorre to build connection to other workers in the garment industry. Known for her ability to build personal relationships, she became a liaison between the garment workers' union and the industry that they worked for. She became further involved with labor organizing, and worked with several unions, including the Teamsters, the United Auto Workers, the Maritime Union, and the United Farm Workers. During this period, she also worked in a pharmaceutical plant.

Through her work with labor organizations, she met fellow activist Bert Corona. The two of them made connections to the Hermandad Mexicana Nacional (HMN), which was at the time one of the only organizations working for Mexican-Americans that was also run by Mexican-Americans. The HMN was facing difficulties due to the activities of the House Un-American Activities Committee, so Corona and Alatorre took charge of the organization, and in 1968 moved it to Los Angeles, where its local chapters came to be known as Centro de Acción Social Autónomo, or CASA. CASA began to work for the rights of immigrant workers, and also provided them social services, including legal help and education. It also advocated for policies in their favor.

Both organizations working for the rights of undocumented immigrants during a time when most mainstream Latino organizations were unwilling to do so. HMN and CASA organized protests against raids targeting immigrant workers, and also offered social and legal support. Among their projects was persuading the media to use the term "undocumented immigrant" in place of "illegal alien".

== Other activism ==
In 1977, CASA worked with several other Latino organizations to advocate for amnesty to undocumented immigrants and against sanctions applied to employers who hired them. Alatorre and Corona constituted a more radical voice within that movement, arguing that undocumented immigrants had earned the right to work in the US, and that they ought to be welcomed. This stance was unusual relative to the views of most Mexican-American organizations, which supported a policy of "Americanization". Alatorre played a significant role within CASA, being responsible for administrative tasks and choosing to remain largely "behind the scenes". Through her work with CASA and elsewhere, Alatorre became known as a prominent activist for civil rights.

In 1968, Corona and Alatorre also became involved in Robert F. Kennedy's primary campaign for California's Senate seat. A few years later Alatorre and Corona were responsible for leading a change in the way the US Democratic Party perceived issues of immigration, partly through their work with labor unions. Alatorre also participated in renter's strikes, protested the Ku Klux Klan in San Diego, and advocated for more Latino representation on television.

== Legacy ==
An obituary for Alatorre in the Los Angeles Times stated that the message she sought to convey through her activism in the 1950s—that illegal immigrants also deserved human rights—"went from heresy to the mainstream and forever altered politics in California and beyond". Rodolfo Acuña, a scholar of Chicano history, called her an "extraordinary person" who "never wavered from her message" and "never compromised." California State Senator Maria Elena Durazo stated that she was inspired to enter politics by Alatorre because she "said regular, simple things that people believed in".

== Sources ==
- García, Mario T. (1994). Memories of Chicano History: The Life and Narrative of Bert Corona. University of California Press. ISBN 9780520916548.
- Gutierrez, Alfredo (4 July 2013). To Sin Against Hope: How America Has Failed Its Immigrants: A Personal History. Verso Books. ISBN 9781844679928.
- Pycior, Julie Leininger (2014). Democratic Renewal and the Mutual Aid Legacy of US Mexicans. Texas A&M University Press. ISBN 9781623491284.
- Ruiz, Vicki L.; Sánchez Korrol, Virginia (2006). Latinas in the United States. Indiana University Press. ISBN 9780253111692.
