= Political Association of Spanish-Speaking Organizations =

The Political Association of Spanish-Speaking Organizations (PASSO) was formed as an outgrowth of the success of the Viva Kennedy Clubs in the 1960 United States Presidential Election. PASSO, which comprised several Mexican-American activist groups, fought to increase Mexican-American participation in electoral politics and campaigned for candidates, generally of Mexican descent, who supported desegregated education, protection from discrimination and federal government jobs for Mexican Americans. Later, the group became involved in farm labor disputes and was ultimately disbanded.

== Postwar Plight for Mexican Americans ==
After World War II, few Anglo-Americans sympathized with the plight of Mexican Americans. In the 1950s, Mexican Americans endured chronic unemployment, limited upward mobility, segregated education and surging rates of illiteracy. Due to the renewed sense of optimism and prosperity after the war, the issues facing Mexican Americans were generally ignored.

Major groups that were once dedicated to combating social problems faced by Mexican Americans such as League of United Latin American Citizens, which experienced a turbulent decade in the 1950s, and Alianza Hispano-Americana lacked organization, funding, influence and a national consensus on the best methods by which to address these major issues. Mexican American activists being more politically active in hopes of stimulating change in policy.

== The Entrance of Mexican Americans into Electoral Politics ==
By 1950, in five major states in the United States, the Mexican-American voting bloc saw unforeseen growth. In Texas, New Mexico, Colorado, Arizona and California, over 80% of Mexicans were eligible to vote. By 1960, the Mexican-American voting block grew even larger, encompassing almost 30% of the overall voting population in some states. Savvy politicians such as United States Senator Dennis Chávez and then-Los Angeles City Councilman Ed Roybal saw potential for increasing civic engagement, political participation and most importantly, electoral turnout by Mexican Americans.

Previously, the national Democratic Party wrote off Mexican Americans as solid liberals who did not need special attention in the quest for the White House. On the other hand, the Republican and Progressive parties attempted to gain ground in the Mexican-American communities. During Henry A. Wallace's 1948 presidential bid, Mexican Americans organized Amigos de Wallace in California and some counties in a few southwestern states. Four years later, the Latin American Veterans and Volunteers for Eisenhower was formed in support of Dwight Eisenhower's successful presidential campaign. However, these groups did not achieve widespread success.

== Viva Kennedy ==
The 1960 Democratic Party Convention was a major turning point in the movement to address some of the issues facing Mexican Americans. A few weeks before the convention, the founder of the American G.I. Forum Hector Garcia, a veteran and medical doctor from Corpus Christi, wrote a letter to national Democratic Party calling for inclusion of Mexican Americans in the electoral process and more importantly, in a potential Democratic presidential administration. Similar to the mission of the G.I. Forum to include Mexican Americans in military actions and strengthen the rights of returning soldiers, Garcia sought to expand the political parameters of American society to include citizens of Mexican descent, calling them "the greatest salesman of Democracy" and fighters of Communism. Garcia desired "judges of Latin American origin, American ambassadors, and consuls of our own origin". Additionally, in the letter, Garcia and other Forum members requested the inclusion of civil rights for Mexican Americans, especially those in the middle class in an effort to appeal to a major tenant of the Democratic Party agenda.

Shortly after the convention in which John F. Kennedy was nominated, Councilman Roybal, then-Texas State Senator Henry Gonzalez and their mentor Senator Chavez, who like Garcia was concerned about the lack of federal government participation by Mexican Americans, met with Robert F. Kennedy to discuss strategy for the involvement of Mexican Americans in the general election. It was determined that Carlos McCormick, a fresh-faced law student who had managed Senator Kennedy's successful primary in West Virginia, would be at the helm of Viva Kennedy, the official Latin American arm of the Kennedy campaign.

After securing the support of Albert Peña, Jr., a prominent supporter of Lyndon B. Johnson during the convention and later the Chairman of Viva Kennedy Texas, McCormick met with Hector Garcia to gain support of members of the G.I. Forum. In exchange for a formal endorsement of Kennedy's campaign, the G.I. Forum requested public praise from Kennedy on the campaign trail. During a stump speech, Kennedy professed his admiration for "this splendid veterans organization of Spanish-speaking ex-servicemen." At their 1960 convention, Forum leaders spoke of the importance of electing Kennedy as President of the United States to desegregate schools, lift up the middle class and assist migrant workers, which are issues that appeal to Mexican American voters.

With widespread support and under the tutelage of Carlos McCormick, G.I. Forum members helped to organize Viva Kennedy chapters in barrios across the United States. Women, businessmen and other subgroups passionately joined the effort to elect Kennedy. Low-key fundraisers would help to pay for get-out-the-vote efforts throughout the nation. Rallies featuring national allies of Kennedy and Spanish language advertisements helped to mobilize and spread support for the campaign.

Despite the fact that then-Vice President Richard Nixon carried more states and won the popular vote, Kennedy emerged victorious in the 1960 United States Presidential Election by winning the electoral vote by a margin of 303-219. President-Elect Kennedy's close margin of victory signified a major success for the Viva Kennedy Clubs because it proved the importance of earning the Mexican American vote. In Texas, Kennedy earned 91% of the Mexican American vote or 200,000 votes, which helped him win the Lone Star State's 24 electoral votes despite losing the white vote. Sixteen of the seventeen Texas counties where there was a Mexican American majority voted overwhelmingly for Kennedy. Throughout the nation, 85% of Mexican Americans voted for Kennedy.

President Kennedy did not end up providing the expected rewards that Mexican Americans were hoping for, which was mainly appointing a Mexican American official in any cabinet-level office in the new Administration . The Viva Kennedy Clubs felt that they had a great lineup of individuals who could fit into Kennedy's cabinet-level administration such as El Paso mayor Raymond L. Telles, Jr., Los Angeles city councilman Edward R. Roybal, and New Mexico academic Vicente Ximenez. Although, Telles was the first Mexican American Ambassador of Costa Rica, members of Viva Kennedy were disappointed because it was not cabinet-level. They also thought the other aforementioned individuals would be potential candidates for assistant secretary of state. However, that position went to Arturo Morales Carrion. Members of Viva Kennedy were thoroughly disappointed; they did not like Morales - Carrion as a representative because he was not Mexican American, he did not come from the Southwest, nor was he a part of Viva Kennedy prior to Kennedy's presidency. After the nomination of Arturo Morales Carrion, President Kennedy helped nominate Hector G. Godinez as postmaster in Santa Ana in Orange County. Godinez was the national president of LULAC and was a World War II veteran; because of his background, many Viva Kennedy members believed he was appointed. The new administration extended an invitation to both Henry B. Gonzalez and Hector P. Garcia to become ambassadors. However, they both decline the offer. Both Gonzalez and Garcia declared that they could not abandon their professional responsibilities in their communities for a permanent diplomatic post.

Yet another result of Viva Kennedy was the development of Political Association of Spanish Speaking Organization (PASSO or PASO). Because of the Viva Kennedy connections, leaders from other Mexican American organizations such as LULAC and American G.I. Forum took the opportunity to create an organization that they believed would create national coordination. PASSO was strongest in Texas even though it was a national organization.

== The Creation of PASSO ==
After the electoral success, McCormick, Peña and Garcia met in Victoria, Texas to discuss the future of Viva Kennedy. The outcome was the conception of a short-lived group known as the Mexican American Political Association, which only a few weeks later joined forces with LULAC and Congressman Ed Roybal's Community Service Organization to form the Political Association of Spanish Speaking Organizations. The newly formed group espoused the policies of onetime LULAC President George I. Sanchez, which included more federal funding for education in Hispanic communities, a living wage for migrant workers, stricter control along the Texas-Mexican border and increased welfare for Mexican Americans.

In 1962, PASSO collaborated with the Teamsters Union to unionize the employees of Del Monte Foods in Crystal City, Texas. The following year, PASSO helped to win all five seats of the Crystal City Council for Mexican Americans. In 1965, PASSO waged a campaign against La Casita Farms, one of the largest agribusinesses in Texas and in doing so, employed more radical tactics, which alienated the middle class members and caused many of them to depart the organization. At the height of the Chicano Movement that swept Texas, the remaining members of PASSO joined the Raza Unida Party, effectively abolishing the organization.

== See also ==
- Mexican American Political Association
