= Mutualista =

Mutualistas were community-based mutual aid societies created by Mexican immigrants in the late 19th century United States. Media analyst Charles M. Tatum described mutualistas as:

"provided most immigrants with a connection to their mother country and served to bring them together to meet their survival needs in a new and alien country. Cultural activities, education, health care, insurance coverage, legal protection and advocacy before police and immigration authorities, and anti-defamation activities were the main functions of these associations.

== Structure ==
Sometimes mutualistas were part of larger organizations affiliated with the Mexican government or other national associations. One such association included Alianza Hispano-Americana, which, founded in 1894 in Tucson, Arizona Territory, had 88 chapters throughout the Southwestern United States by 1919. Usually mutualistas had separate women's auxiliaries, but some, including Club Femenino Orquidia in San Antonio, Texas and Sociedad Josefa Ortiz de Domínguez in Laredo, were founded and run by women.

While Tatum lauds mutualistas for "bringing together Mexican nationals from different social classes to form a common bond, a feat that no organization had been able to achieve in Mexico", there were indeed social divisions within mutualistas. Some, such as Club Mexicano Independencia in Santa Barbara, California, were only open to male citizens of Mexico. Others had elitist membership restrictions.

Many historians describe the "familiar" orientation of mutualista societies. They fostered sentiments of unity, mutual protection, and volunteerism. Historian Vicki L. Ruiz sees mutualistas as "institutionalized forms of compadrazgo and commadrazgo", the "concrete manifestations" of which were orphanages and nursing homes.

Some mutualistas became politically active in the American Civil Rights Movement. The Comité de Vecinos de Lemon Grove filed a successful desegregation suit against the Lemon Grove School District in 1931. Many of the people that were involved in mutualismo were active in the subsequent Chicano student political, and feminist movements. María Hernández, who formed Orden Caballeros de America with her husband Pedro in 1929, later worked on educational desegregation and supported the Raza Unida Party.

The term is still used in Uruguay to describe a form of health insurance.
