= Nativo Lopez =

American politician and activist (1951–2019)

- Born: October 3, 1951
- Died: May 19, 2019
- Occupation: Immigrant rights activist

Nativo Lopez-Vigil (born Larry Lopez; October 3, 1951 – May 19, 2019) was an American political leader and immigrant rights activist in Southern California. Lopez was a national president of the Mexican American Political Association and the national director of the Hermandad Mexicana Latinoamericana (formerly the Hermandad Mexicana La Original), a community service and advocacy organization for Mexican and Latin American immigrants throughout the United States.

== Early life and education ==
Lopez was born in Los Angeles and raised in Norwalk, California. He became an activist in 1968, inspired by Bert Corona and Cesar Chavez. Prior to college at UCLA and California State University, Dominguez Hills, Lopez who was born Larry Nativo Lopez, changed his name to Nativo Vigil Lopez. He organized student walk-outs from high schools in order to demonstrate for education reform. He was involved in successful efforts to win a large-scale amnesty for undocumented immigrants in 1986, and became involved in a campaign to allow undocumented immigrants to obtain drivers' licenses in the 1990s.

== Career ==
Lopez served on the school board of Santa Ana, California for six years, from 1997 until 2003. He was recalled from office after a campaign led by Ron Unz, the multi-millionaire backer of California Proposition 227, which prohibited bilingual education programs. He was accused of failing to enforce Prop 227, informing parents of their rights under the new law to opt for bilingual education for their children. He sued to challenge the use of English-only recall petitions as a violation of the Voting Rights Act, and won in the Ninth Circuit federal appeals court, although the case is not yet resolved. Another issue involved in the recall campaign was the proposed construction of an elementary school in the wealthiest side of Santa Ana, but opposed by the majority wealthy Republican and conservative constituency of the city. Lopez was recalled by 71% of the voters and lost every single one of the 16 precincts were the ballots were cast, including areas with majority Latino voters.

Lopez, backed by the Mexican American Legal Defense and Educational Fund, filed a lawsuit against the petition and recall process, claiming the English-only petitions violated the Voting Rights Act. California began providing Spanish-language ballots statewide in 2002, and local jurisdictions also provide multilingual election materials. But petitions, which are written by ordinary people hoping to change laws from the grass-roots level, are often available in English only.

The initial suit, Padilla v. Lever, sought to prevent the recall election from proceeding. The suit unsuccessfully sought an injunction to prevent the election from occurring, after the petition signatures had been collected and certified by Orange County elections officials. The district court denied the injunction. After the recall election took place and Lopez was recalled, the plaintiffs appealed to a 3-judge panel of the Ninth Circuit . There, the idea that the recall election was illegal was originally upheld, although an en banc panel later overturned that decision.

Lopez assisted in organizing the 2006 United States immigration reform protests, both the March 25, 2006 demonstration of between 500,000 and 1,000,000 people in Los Angeles, and the Great American Boycott on May 1, 2006, which involved between 500,000 and about 1,000,000 people in Los Angeles. On April 13, 2006, Lopez appeared on Lou Dobbs' television show, where he argued that "illegal immigrant" is an offensively racist term on par with "wop," "nigger," or "kike."

=== Voter registration fraud ===
In 2009, Lopez was charged by the Los Angeles District Attorney's office with eight felony counts, including voter-registration fraud, perjury, filing a false instrument, and fraudulent voting.

In 2008, although Lopez lived at his Santa Ana home, he switched his voter registration to the Boyle Heights, Los Angeles office of Hermandad Mexicana Latinoamericana, the group he led, and allegedly cast an illegal ballot in Los Angeles County in the 2008 presidential primary, rather than Orange County. In court, Lopez was engaged in "a tumultuous judicial process, with Lopez jailed twice after conflicts with judges." He underwent several hearings and evaluations to determine his mental competency to stand trial, and abruptly fired his lawyer and chose to represent himself in mid-2009.

Finally, in 2011, in an agreement with prosecutors, Lopez pleaded guilty to one felony count of voter registration fraud. The seven other felony charges were dropped. Lopez was sentenced to one year of probation by Judge William C. Ryan, and ordered to perform 400 hours of community service.

Lopez died on May 19, 2019, aged 67. He was survived by three daughters, and a son.

== See also ==
- Chicano Movement
