= La Reina, El Salvador =

La Reina
- District
- Location in El Salvador
- Coordinates: 14°11′N 89°9′W
- Country: El Salvador
- Department: Chalatenango
- Municipality: Chalatenango Centro
- Elevation: 1,486 ft (453 m)

Population (2024)
  - District: 7,583
  - Rank: 155th in El Salvador
  - Urban: 6
  - Rural: 7,577

La Reina is a district in the Chalatenango Department of El Salvador.
