= Bert Corona =

American labor leader (1918–2001)

Humberto N. Corona
- Corona in 1997
- Born: May 29, 1918
- Died: January 15, 2001 (aged 82)
- Occupations: Labor movement and civil rights leader

Humberto Noé Corona (May 29, 1918 – January 15, 2001) was a Mexican-American labor and civil rights leader. Throughout his long career, he worked with nearly every major Mexican-American organization, founding or co-founding several. He organized workers for the Congress of Industrial Organizations and fought on the behalf of immigrants. By the time of the Chicano Movement of the 1960s and 1970s, he was known as El Viejo ("the Old Man"), and was well-known and respected as a veteran activist.

== Family background ==
Corona's father Noé Corona was a commander in Francisco Villa's División del Norte during the Mexican Revolution, which he joined after members of his family were killed in a massacre at Tomochic, Chihuahua. Noé Corona was an anarcho-syndicalist and member of Partido Liberal Mexicano.

His mother, Margarita Escápite Salayandía, was a Chihuahua schoolteacher educated at Protestant missionary schools. His maternal grandmother was a physician. The family emigrated to El Paso, Texas in 1914 or 1915, marrying at about the same time. His parents married in the Juarez customs house under Villa's sponsorship. They settled into a home in the predominantly Mexican Segundo Barrio neighborhood where their four children Aurora, Humberto, Orlando, and Horacio were born.

In El Paso, his father worked in the logging and rock cutting industries, while simultaneously continuing clandestine revolutionary activities. He longed to return to Mexico, however, and in 1922, when the Obregón government granted the family's petition for amnesty, they returned to Chihuahua. After several months, Noé Corona secured a position with the federal government as a forest ranger in Texcoco. There he and several other Villistas were murdered while attempting to extinguish a forest fire. According to Corona, "We believed the assassins were agents of President Obregón, who feared that the villistas were planning to reorganize and overthrow the government." After his father's death, the Corona family returned to El Paso, where young Humberto grew up surrounded by tales of the Revolution and the Protestant social networks of his mother and grandmother. "Religion, specifically Protestantism, was also very significant in my socialization and in influencing my own later political activity."

== Education ==
Corona began his education at Mexican Protestant kindergartens, but enrolled in public school in the first grade. There his command of English, which his mother had taught him, caused him to excel. He remained in the Texas public system until the fourth grade, when his mother, disgusted with the mistreatment of Mexican-American and Mexican immigrant students, sent him to Harwood Boys School in Albuquerque, New Mexico. There, he learned a sense of discipline, but also experienced racism. In protest of the threatened expulsion of students who spoke out against physical abuse from a coach charged with disciplining students, in addition to negative portrayals of the Mexican War, the Mexican Revolution, and Pancho Villa, the students struck, refusing to attend classes. The administration rescinded the expulsions and forced the coach to apologize.

He returned to El Paso for high school, attending the "Mexican" (segregated) Bowie High School, and later, El Paso High School, a "White" school that had recently begun to integrate some middle- and upper-class Mexican students. Humberto, whose name had by this point been Americanized to Bert, played on the varsity basketball team for three years. As a young student, he was particularly struck by the impact of the Great Depression on the Mexican repatriados and Dust Bowl migrants, many of whom were treated by his grandmother.

During high school he became politicized through reading the work of muckrakers and engaging in an anarchosyndicalist discussion group. He and other Mexican students strategized to elect a Mexican student body president, the first ever at El Paso High.

After graduating in 1934, Corona worked in a drug store and played in a local basketball league. In 1936 he accepted an athletic scholarship from the University of Southern California (USC). He moved in with an aunt and uncle in Boyle Heights, then a predominantly Jewish area of East Los Angeles. He quickly became acquainted with the barrios, however, through volunteer work with El Salvador Church. In collaboration with Reverend Kendrick Watson, he organized for better housing conditions.

During his time in Los Angeles, Corona was exposed to Communist-influenced International Workers Order (IWO) and Workers Alliance of America, who agitated for government relief. He also listened to Magonista anarchosyndicalist speakers at La Placita Olvera.

At USC, Corona undertook a five-year law program. He hurt his ankle early in his freshman year, and subsequently sat out the rest of the season. As a result, he dedicated his energy to his studies and to the "Non-Org Association", a coalition of lower-class students who soon came to dominate school politics.

By 1937, Corona was involved with the CIO, and shortly afterward he decided he preferred labor organizing to basketball. He remained in school, however, and became active in the Mexican American Movement (MAM) of Los Angeles-area college students. MAM focused attention on the unequal educational opportunities of Mexican American students, as well as police brutality. MAM disbanded with the entry of the United States into World War II, when many of its members volunteered for military service.

== Union activities ==
During his studies at USC, Corona worked for Brunswig Drug Company as a checker. He and his colleagues were approached by the striking International Longshore and Warehouse Union (ILWU), which they agreed to support. The longshoremen won their demands, and the drugstore workers, who felt they were receiving unfair treatment, were inspired to form a union of their own. They organized as a local of the ILWU, electing Marion Phelps president and Corona recording secretary. He served on various committees in the union and learned organizing skills from Lloyd Seeliger. In 1940 Corona was named head of the Local 26's strike committee and in 1941, in the wake of Phelps's resignation, was unanimously elected local president. Shortly after his election, a rival contender for the presidency organized an unauthorized slowdown for which Corona was blamed and fired. Harry Bridges, chief of the ILWU and a major figure within the CIO, offered Corona a position as a CIO organizer.

With the CIO, Corona worked to unionize Molokan and Mexican workers in the waste material industries. He also reached out to the children of the Mexican workers, the Pachucos, who aided the union. As the CIO unionized workers in the various industries throughout the city, Corona and other organizers secured employment for the disenfranchised youth in those same fields, solidifying the bond between the two groups.

During the 1940s the CIO forged an alliance with Luisa Moreno's Spanish-Speaking People's Congress to advocate on behalf of the Spanish-speaking peoples of the United States. The Congreso marked a change from previous efforts:

Unlike some of the moderate Mexican-American organizations such as LULAC, which at the time differentiated between Mexican-Americans and Mexican immigrants, El Congreso opposed such differentiations and instead stressed the unity of all the Spanish-speaking, U.S. citizens or not. An attack on one Spanish-speaking group was an attack on all. That sense of unity was one of the beautiful things about El Congreso and was why it captivated so many people even though it was a relatively small movement with very little money.

The Congreso worked closely with the CIO on the issues of labor rights, police brutality, inequality in schools, and access to public facilities. One of the major campaigns of the time was the defense of the Mexican American youth accused of the Sleepy Lagoon murder. Corona served on the defense committee alongside journalist Carey McWilliams and actor Anthony Quinn.

Corona also became involved in the struggle against racial discrimination in the criminal justice system when he joined the defense committee of Fetus Coleman, an African American man wrongfully accused of rape. As a result of the defense committee's efforts, Coleman was freed.

== Marriage ==
On August 2, 1941, Corona and Blanche Taff, a Jewish-American labor organizer he met during the a United Auto Workers drive to organize Los Angeles aviation workers, eloped to Yuma, Arizona. According to Corona, their cultural differences were an issue, but their union was a natural one given the circumstances:

In the labor and radical circles I was a part of, there was a good deal of interaction, both political and social, among people of different racial and ethnic backgrounds. Our common commitments and struggles brought us together. Racism or ethnic conflict was not a part, or at least not a significant part, of these interactions. In the 1930s, young people of all races were drawn together in the unions and in the Popular Front struggles of the period. It was an interracial and interethnic movement with lofty ideals.

The couple moved into a house in the Silver Lake neighborhood of Los Angeles. When, during World War II, their neighbors supported the Japanese American internment, the Coronas moved to an apartment in the Mid-Wilshire district. They again found trouble when their new landlord complained about their inviting African American union members for visits, accusing them of attempting to integrate the neighborhood. He encouraged the other tenants to petition to have the Coronas evicted, but the Coronas held a party for all of their neighbors, inviting the Black friends and their congressperson, Will Rogers Jr. While the representative was unable to attend, his wife, Martha Fall Rogers, who had been a classmate of Corona's at El Paso High School, did. She helped convince the neighbors to drop the petition, and the Coronas lived there until Corona enlisted in the army and Blanche moved back in with her parents.

Corona remarried Angelina Casillas in 1994. Corona is survived by his daughter Margo De Lay, Frank Corona, and Ernesto Corona.

== World War II ==
Several months after the Japanese bombing of Pearl Harbor, Corona volunteered in the Army Air Corps and resigned from his position with the union. He underwent basic training at Buckley Field in Colorado. During this training, he witnessed discriminatory treatment of Mexican-American and Jewish enlistees. He underwent officer training in Cedar City, Utah, where he and the other cadets were not welcomed by the mostly-Mormon local population. The locals resented the displacement of the students of Southern Utah State College, the campus of which was taken over by the military. But they were even more concerned that the soldiers would "corrupt" their daughters. These fears were allayed after a town meeting, and led to warmer relations between the townspeople and the soldiers.

After a year of training in Cedar City, Corona was sent to the Army Air Base in Santa Ana, California for flight training. Corona was promoted to wing adjutant and had numerous clerical responsibilities. At the time, he worked a sixteen-hour day, half of which was spent in training, the other half in the office. In Santa Ana, he underwent a psychiatric evaluation designed to identify homosexuals and political "deviants." He was labeled "probably patriotic," which was "most often applied to individuals from groups whose patriotism was considered questionable because of past grievances against the United States."

Shortly after the evaluation, Corona was questioned by a group of officers about his political ideology and union activities. He was asked his opinion about the books Mission to Moscow by Joseph E. Davies and One World by Wendell Willkie. Shortly thereafter, he was subject to another round of interrogation, this one lasting even longer. While he was never informed of the results of these rounds of questioning, he received an order removing him from his squadron and the Air Corps.

Following his dismissal from the Air Corps, Corona was sent to Torney Army General Hospital in Palm Springs, California, where he was assigned mailroom duty. He was transferred to the surgical unit where he served as a surgical assistant. While in Palm Springs, he helped to organize soldiers' fora, which were held every Friday night at the home of the movie producer Joseph Schenck. The fora discussed issues of racism, religious discrimination, and red-baiting.

Corona transferred to the Rainbow Division and received combat training in Oklahoma. The Rainbow Division, however, did not enjoy a good reputation at the time, and Corona transferred to Fort Benning for paratrooper training. He was also trained as a demolition specialist.

Just prior to his unit's being deployed overseas, Corona requested a pass to go to Atlanta for the weekend. According to Corona, "a trick was pulled on me to ensure that I would either get kicked out of the paratroopers or miss the opportunity to go with my division to see combat." Disembarking, he was approached by two military police officers, who requested to see his pass. Finding that it only allowed him to go to Columbus, they locked him in the federal prison in Atlanta's Fort McDonald. He was not permitted to contact his commanding officer, and was held incommunicado for over a month. He became friendly with a guard who had been a union member in Chicago who plotted to provide him access to a telephone. His unit having shipped out, he was unable to reach his commanding officer. While a prisoner, he got to know other soldiers who had been jailed for being conscientious objectors who were able to smuggle letters out for him upon being discharged. The letters, which were addressed to his wife and Harry Bridges, resulted in his release. Corona was able to have the AWOL removed from his record, but never received payment for the forty-five days he was incarcerated.

Just when it seemed unlikely that Corona would be able to serve overseas, his colonel received a request for people for the Signal Corps. He was sent to Camp Crowder in Neosho, Missouri for training, and was set to see duty in the Pacific. However, while in Neoshe, he ran into Jaime Del Amo, who had served Francoist Spain as Spanish consul in Los Angeles. Del Amo identified Corona as a "subversive" who had participated in the Spanish-speaking People's Congress, and Corona was sent to the processing center at Camp McClellan in Northern California, where he remained until the end of the war. According to Corona, "I entered the service as a buck private, and I left as one. I paid the price of having been involved in progressive causes and was one of those stigmatized and red-baited because of my involvement."

== Post-war ==
Following his discharge from the Army, Corona and his wife settled in East Los Angeles, taking up residence in the Ramona Gardens housing project. With Reverend Kendrick Watson and Bill Taylor, he formed Mexican-American Committee for Justice in Housing to open up the projects to Mexican Americans. As a result, the housing authority agreed to negotiate with the committee.

Corona sought to return to work with the union, but found that his post had been filled during his military service. He turned instead to the docks, seeking work as a longshoreman, which he was unable to secure due to the Coast Guard's requirement that dockworkers have a security clearance.

In 1947, Corona accepted a job as a diamond salesman for his father-in-law's business. He and his family, which included his daughter Margo, who had been born during the war, relocated to Mill Valley. There, his two sons David and Frank were born.

Despite working in private business, Corona retained an interest in union activities. During the 1950s, however, it became more difficult to organize movements. He became involved in the effort to build the Independent Progressive Party in the Bay Area, on whose ticket former Wallace ran. Following the failed campaign, Corona became involved in the Community Service Organization (CSO). He agreed with the goals of the CSO, but disagreed with "one of its stated reasons for organizing [...] to keep the "reds" from establishing a base in the communities. I knew that when they referred to "reds," they meant those Mexicans who were either working with the CP or involved with ANMA, the Asociación Nacional México-Americana." The CSO directed voter registration drives that led to the election of Assemblyperson Byron Rumford, one of the first African Americans to be elected to the body, and other officials. It also took on the issues of affordable housing, police brutality, and access to public services.

Corona first met César Chávez in the late 1940s or early 1950s, after having heard positive things about him from members of the Catholic and Quaker churches. Chávez spoke at a conference sponsored by Bay Area chapters of CSO, and impressed Corona with his directness, honesty, and "down-to-earth approach."

== ANMA ==
While Corona worked with CSO, he was more active with the Asociación Nacional México-Americana, which he viewed as the "real inheritor of El Congreso's more militant and left tradition." ANMA was supported by the independent progressive unions, particularly the Mine, Mill and Smelter Workers (Mine-Mill). It may also have had support from the Communist Party, which had been driven underground. He was introduced to ANMA by Lucío Bernabé, a labor organizer in San José, and soon after joining became the organization's chief organizer in Northern California. ANMA's primary goal was the unionization of Mexican workers. It also fought against labor discrimination against Mexican workers, which included such practices as assigning Mexican workers the most dangerous tasks. Companies were also loath to promote their Mexican workers.

In 1951, Corona was chosen to represent ANMA at international conference of mineworkers in Mexico City, where he was charged with promoting the cause of the striking mineworkers of Southern New Mexico. The strike was the subject of the 1954 film Salt of the Earth, whose star Rosaura Revueltas had been imprisoned on immigration charges. There he met mineworkers and labor organizers from all over Latin America, as well as prominent Mexican intellectuals including Diego Rivera, Frida Kahlo, David Alfaro Siqueiros, and the writer José Revueltas, the brother of Rosaura Revueltas. José Revueltas organized a picket of the U.S. embassy in Mexico City to protest his sister's imprisonment that was attended by thousands of college students, which succeeded in pressuring the United States to release her.

Following the conference, Corona was invited to spend a few days at the Rivera's and Kahlo's home in Coyoacán. At the time, Rivera was working on a mural on the history of theatre at the Teatro de los Insurgentes, and his home was being watched by the FBI, especially for American visitors.

The FBI targeted ANMA and its leaders for harassment. In 1953, agents visited Corona's home while he was at work, informing his wife that they wanted to speak with him. They returned when Corona was home from work, and asked or his help identifying communists in ANMA and various unions. Corona suggested that they investigate fascists such as the sinarquistas, who he believed represented a greater threat to national security. They contacted him several more times, but Corona refused to cooperate. However, their harassment of other ANMA leaders led to the folding of several chapters, especially in Southern California.

== MAPA ==
In April 1960, Corona was one of the founders of the Mexican American Political Association, which was organized as a result of the view that the Democratic Party had failed to genuinely address concerns of Mexican-Americans. Corona led MAPA's Northern Californian operations, serving as the organization's president from 1966 to 1971.

Corona was also closely associated with Hermandad Mexicana Nacional, which emphasized organizing unions and defending and providing social services to undocumented workers. He met fellow activist Soledad Alatorre during the latter's work with labor organizations. The two of them made connections to the HMN, which was at the time one of the only organizations working for Mexican-Americans that was also run by Mexican-Americans. The HMN was facing difficulties due to the activities of the House Un-American Activities Committee, so Corona and Alatorre took charge of the organization, and in 1968 moved it to Los Angeles, where its local chapters came to be known as Centro de Acción Social Autónomo, or "CASA". CASA began to work for the rights of immigrant workers, and also provided them social services, including legal help and education. It also advocated for policies in their favor.

From the late 1960s to the 1980s, Corona taught as a part-time instructor in the controversial emerging field of Chicano Studies at California State University, Northridge and California State University, Los Angeles.

In 1968, Dr. Martin Luther King Jr. invited Corona, along with Corky Gonzales, Reies Tijerina to Atlanta to plan for the March on Poverty. King, however, was assassinated before the march took place.

== Immigrant activism ==
Corona taught Chicano Studies at California State University – Los Angeles from 1970 to 1982, when he was dismissed. One of the Corona's significant contributions was to educate the majority population that immigrant workers were a substantive part of the U.S. labor force, not a temporary phenomenon. His efforts and the work of CASA encouraged a unity between immigrant workers and U.S. born Mexican Americans. As a founder and leader of Hermandad Mexicana Nacional he played an important role in the efforts to gain an amnesty program for undocumented workers in the Immigration Reform and Control act 1986. IRCA. Corona continued to organize along with labor unions to change immigration policy and practices of unions and of the nation. In part as a result of his efforts, the AFL-CIO changed its policy on immigration in 2000, and some member unions began to restructure their unions to address the needs of immigrant workers.

== See also ==
- List of civil rights leaders
- Soledad Alatorre

== Bibliography ==
- Bacon, David (2001-01-19). "El Valiente Chicano". David Bacon Photographs & Stories.
- García, Mario T. (1994). Memories of Chicano History: The Life and Narrative of Bert Corona. Berkeley, California: University of California Press. ISBN 0-520-20152-3.
- Ortega, Carlos F. (August 2001). "The Legacy of Bert Corona". The Progressive: 26–27.
- Campbell, Duane . (January–March 1989). "Bert Corona: Labor Radical". Socialist Review. 19 (1): 41–55.
- Bacon, David (2008). Illegal People: How Globalization Creates Migration and Criminalizes Immigrants. Boston: Beacon Press. ISBN 978-0-8070-4226-7.
- Pycior, Julie Leininger (2014). Democratic Renewal and the Mutual Aid Legacy of US Mexicans. Texas A&M University Press. ISBN 9781623491284.
- Ruiz, Vicki L.; Sánchez Korrol, Virginia (2006). Latinas in the United States. Indiana University Press. ISBN 9780253111692.
- Shaw, Randy (2008). Beyond the Fields: Cesar Chavez, the UFW, and the Struggle for Justice in the 21st. Century. Berkeley, California: University of California Press. ISBN 978-0-520-25107-6.

== Research resources ==
- Bert N. Corona Papers, 1923–1984 (24 linear ft.) are housed in the Department of Special Collections and University Archives at Stanford University Libraries
