= Mexican American Political Association =

American political organization

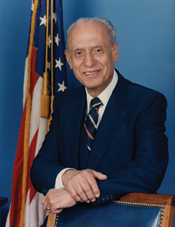
California Representative Edward Roybal, the first president of MAPA.

The Mexican American Political Association (MAPA) is an organization based in California that promotes the interests of Mexican-Americans, Mexicans, Latinos, Chicanos, Hispanics, and Latino economic refugees in the United States. Founded in 1960, their goal was to further incorporate Mexican-Americans into American politics and society through increased voter turnout and election to public office. MAPA, alongside the rest of the member organizations of the Political Association of Spanish-Speaking Organizations (PASSO), developed from the Viva Kennedy Campaign to elect John F. Kennedy president.

== History ==
The Mexican American Political Association (MAPA) was organized by 150 volunteer delegates (previously involved in the Viva Kennedy Campaign) at Fresno in April 1960 as a means to elect Mexican American candidates to public office. Edward R. Roybal, later elected to the United States House of Representatives, served as its first chair/president. During the 1960 election, MAPA campaigned heavily on behalf of the Kennedy campaign. Throughout the 1960s, MAPA was active in the Civil Rights Movement and the Chicano political movement, joining the short-lived Political Association of Spanish-Speaking Organizations. MAPA members also aided Cesar Chavez and the United Farm Workers in political and labor negotiations.

From 1960 to 1964 the organization grew over twelve times in size, with 36 total chapters. That year, MAPA endorsed Lyndon B. Johnson for president and became part of the Viva Johnson movement. Also in 1964, the organization influenced California governor Pat Brown to abolish the Bracero Program in California, with some MAPA members appointed for the sake of coordination.

In the late 1970s, MAPA became increasingly involved with California governor Jerry Brown, gaining appointments to his administration.

In 2009, the group fell under scrutiny after MAPA president, Nativo Lopez, was charged with voter fraud.

In recent years, MAPA has been on the decline, with subsiding membership and political activity. The organization is viewed by many as having outlived its usefulness, as with the increasing involvement of Mexican Americans in American politics, its founding goals have been achieved. In 2009 MAPA clashed with other Latino political organizations after Nativo Lopez voiced support for a boycott of the 2010 census.

== Structure ==
MAPA is a grass roots-based coalition with an organizational structure that functions as a collective of communal circles working together, at different levels, towards political empowerment, self-determination and sustainability of the Latino community’s future. Its primary goal is community-focused political action.

MAPA is officially a non-partisan organization and welcomes members of any political affiliation.

== Tactics ==
To accomplish the goal of political empowerment for Mexican Americans, MAPA focuses on electing Mexican Americans to public office, registering voters, and raising political awareness and involvement from a grassroots level of community organizations.

== Presidents ==
- Edward Roybal, 1960–1962
- Julius Castellum, 1962
- Eduardo Quevedo, 1963–1966
- Bert Corona, 1966–1971
- Armando Rodriguez, 1971–1973
- Margaret Cruz, 1973–1975
- Manuel Lopez, 1975 – 1977
- Eduardo Sandoval, 1977 – 1981
- Julio Calderon, 1981 – 1983
- Fernando Chavez, 1983 – 1985
- Beatriz Molina, 1985 – 1989
- Ben Benavidez, 1989 – 1995
- Hector Brolo, 1995 – 1997
- Ben Benavidez, 1997 – 1999
- Gloria Torres, 1999 – 2001
- Ben Benavidez, 2001 – 2003
- Nativo Lopez, 2004–2012
- Juan "Ralphy" Avitia, 2013–2015

== See also ==
- List of Mexican-American political organizations
- MALDEF
- William C. Velasquez Institute
- Brown Berets
- Political Association of Spanish-Speaking Organizations
