= List of Los Angeles Unified School District schools =

This is a list of schools in the Los Angeles Unified School District. The concept of zones is explained on the LAUSD website.

== K–12 schools ==
Zoned schools

- Elizabeth Learning Center (only K–8 is zoned) (Cudahy, opened 1927)
- James A. Foshay Learning Center, Exposition Park (only 6–12 is zoned; in order to attend Foshay LC for 9–12, a student has to have been enrolled as an 8th grader) (Los Angeles, opened 1924)
- Robert F. Kennedy Community Schools (opened 2010)
- Vaughn Next Century Learning Center (formerly Vaughn Street Elementary School)

Magnet/alternative schools

- Lake Balboa Magnet (Los Angeles) – currently the only K–12 Magnet School in LAUSD.

== Special Education Schools ==
- Alfonso B Perez Special Education Center
- Banneker Special Education Center (Willowbrook)
- Charles Leroy Lowman Special Ed & Career Transition Center
- CTC - West
- Diane S Leichman Career Preparatory and Transition Center
- Ernest P Willenberg Special Education Center
- James J McBride Special Education Center
- Joaquin Miller Career and Transition Center
- J.P. Widney High School
- Marlton School (Los Angeles, opened 1968) – for deaf and hearing-impaired students
- Sophia T Salvin Special Education Center
- Sven Lokrantz Special Education Center

== 4–12 schools ==
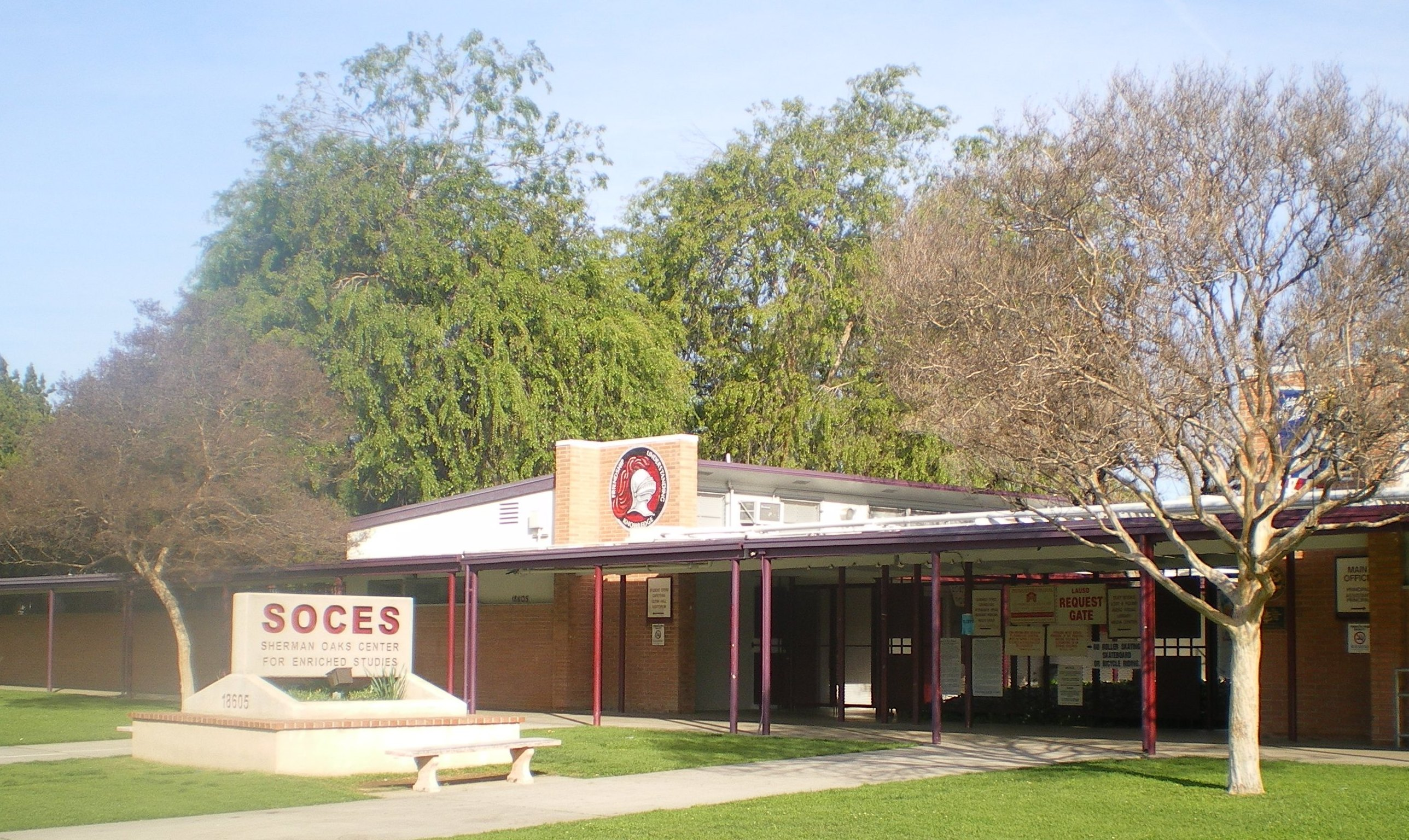
Sherman Oaks Center for Enriched Studies

Zoned schools

- Robert F. Kennedy Community Schools (Central Los Angeles New Learning Center 1 Middle School/High School) (opened September 2010, Los Angeles Unified School District, Facilities Services Division) (on the site of the Ambassador Hotel)

Magnet schools

- Sherman Oaks Center for Enriched Studies

== K–8 schools ==
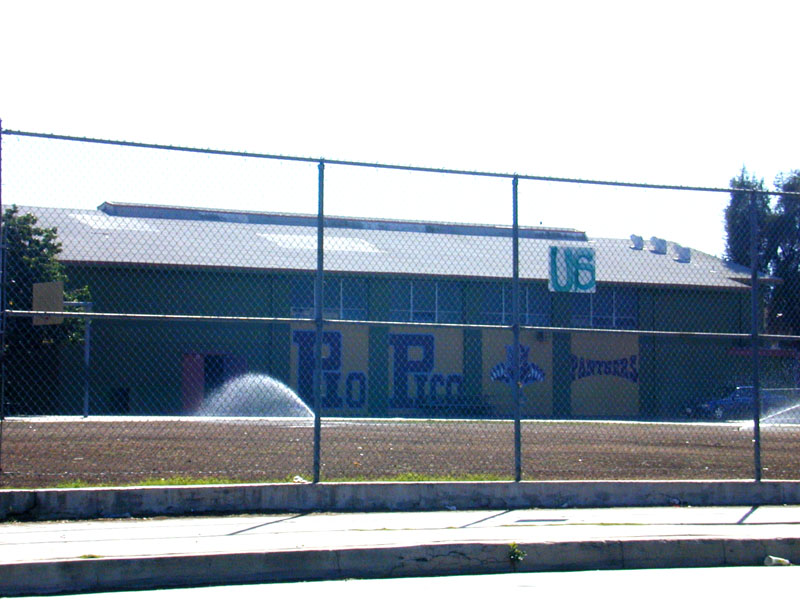
Pio Pico Span School

Zoned schools

- Arroyo Seco Museum Science Magnet
- Brooklyn Avenue School
- Harry Bridges Span School, Wilmington, LA
- Caroldale Learning Community (Carson)
- Castelar Street Elementary (嘉德士樂小學) (4th oldest elementary school in LAUSD located in Chinatown, opened 1882.)
- Ellen Ochoa Learning Center (Cudahy, opened 2004)
- George De La Torre Elementary School (opened 2006, replaced Island Avenue school, Wilmington, LA)
- Hesby Oaks School (Los Angeles, reopened 2006)
- Laurel Cinematic Arts Creative Tech Magnet
- Menlo Elementary School
- Porter Ranch Community School (Los Angeles, opened 2012)
- Sylmar Leadership Academy (Los Angeles, opened 2012)
- Utah Street Span School
- Vinedale College Preparatory

(Formerly Vinedale Elementary School)

- Western Avenue T.E.C.H. Magnet
- Westside Global Awareness Magnet

=== Option schools ===
- Academia Semillas del Pueblo (K–7, opened 2002)

== Secondary schools ==
=== 6–12 schools ===
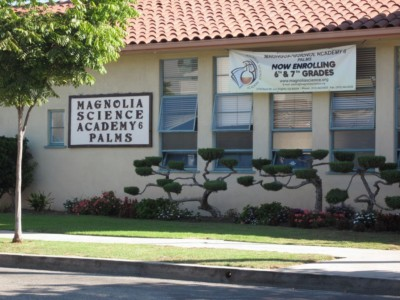
Magnolia Science Academy-6 Palms

- Boys Academic Leadership Academy
- Girls Academic Leadership Academy (GALA) (opened 2016)
- Horace Mann UCLA Community School (originally Horace Mann Middle School) (opened 2019)
- International Studies Learning Center (opened 2019)
- Logan Academy of Global Ecology
- Los Angeles Center for Enriched Studies
- Maywood Center for Enriched Studies (Maywood, opened 2017)
- Rancho Dominguez Preparatory School (Carson/Long Beach) (opened 2011)
- Robert Fulton College Preparatory School (opened 2010)
- Science Academy STEM Magnet
- Sonia Sotomayor Learning Academies
- Valley Oaks Center for Enriched Studies (VOCES) Magnet
- Magnolia Public Schools, Los Angeles Area
  - Magnolia Science Academy-1 Reseda (Grades 6–12) (opened 2002)
  - Magnolia Science Academy-2 Valley
  - Magnolia Science Academy-3 Carson
  - Magnolia Science Academy-4 Venice
  - Magnolia Science Academy-5 Los Lobos (Grades 6–10)
  - Magnolia Science Academy-6 Palms (Grades 6–8, opened 2009)
  - Magnolia Science Academy-8 Bell (Grades 6–8)

=== 7–12 schools ===
Zoned schools

- Eagle Rock High School (opened 1927)
  - Alternative Education
- Aggeler Community Day School (Alternative Education)
- Dorothy V Johnson Community Day School (Alternative Education)
- Jack London Community Day School (Alternative Education)
- Ramona Opportunity High School (Alternative Education)
- Richard A Alonzo Community Day School (Alternative Education)
- Tri-C Community Day School (Alternative Education)
- William J Johnston Community Day School (Alternative Education)

== High schools (grades 9–12) ==
=== Zoned high schools ===
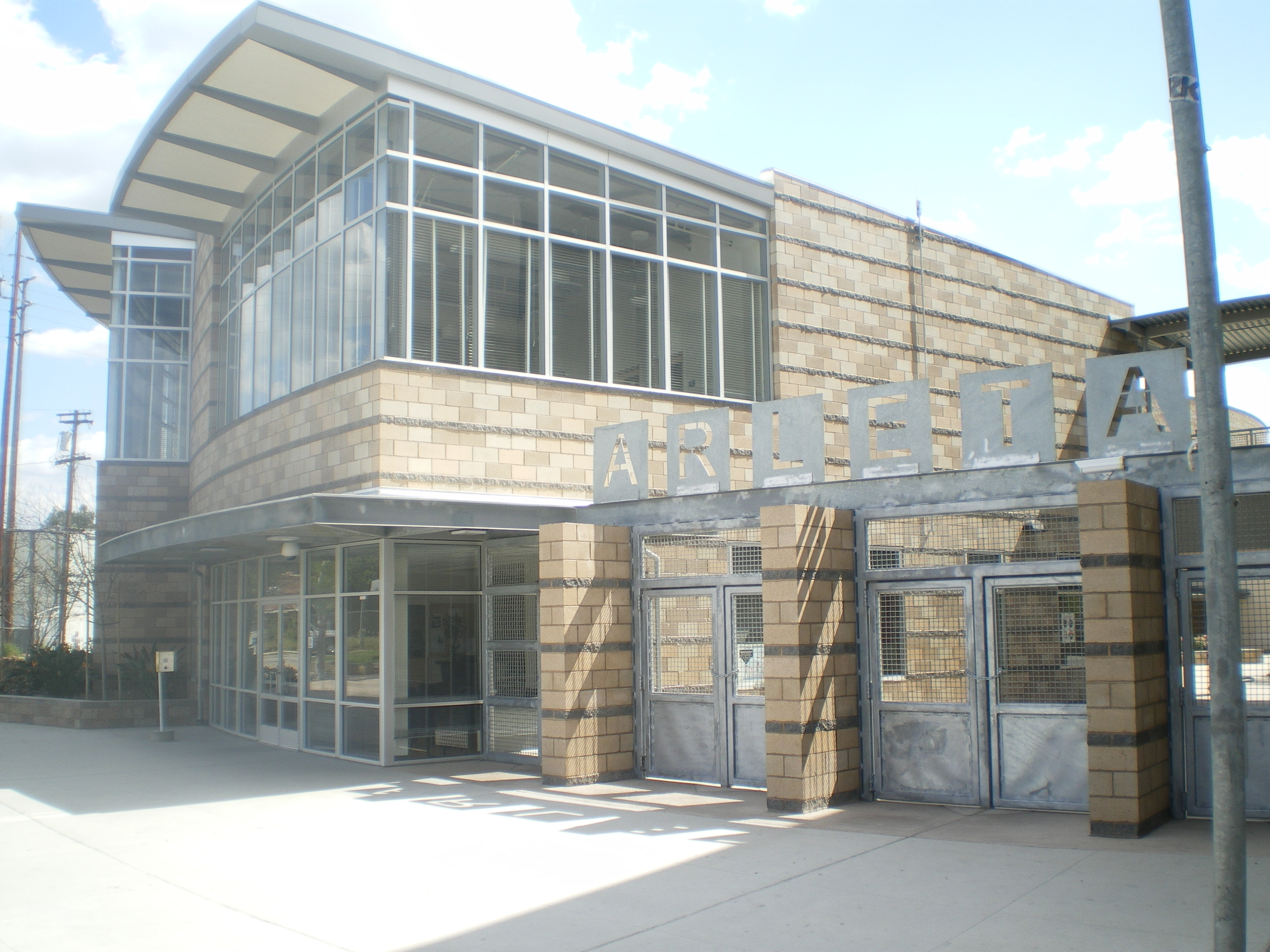
Arleta High School

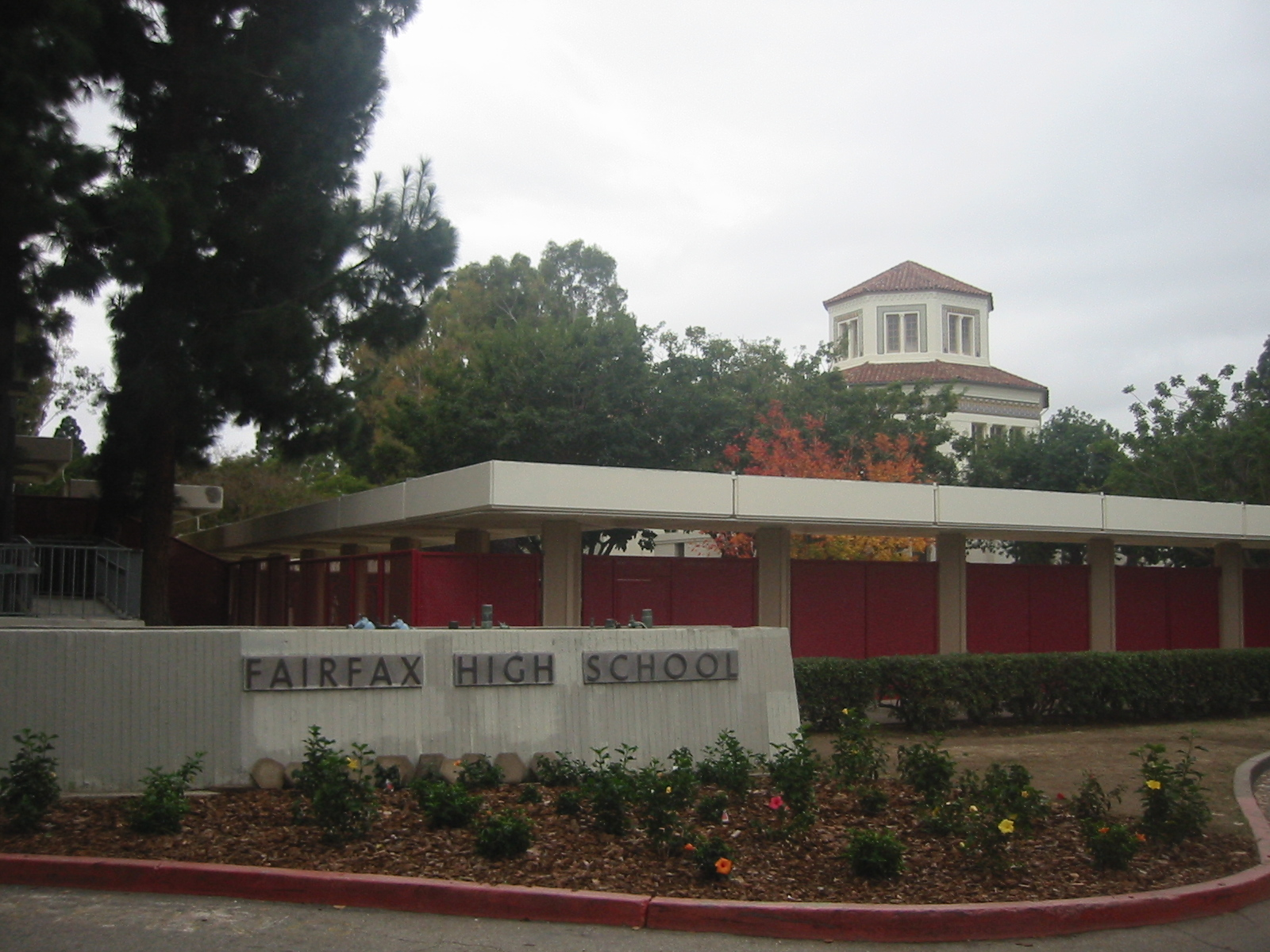
Fairfax High School

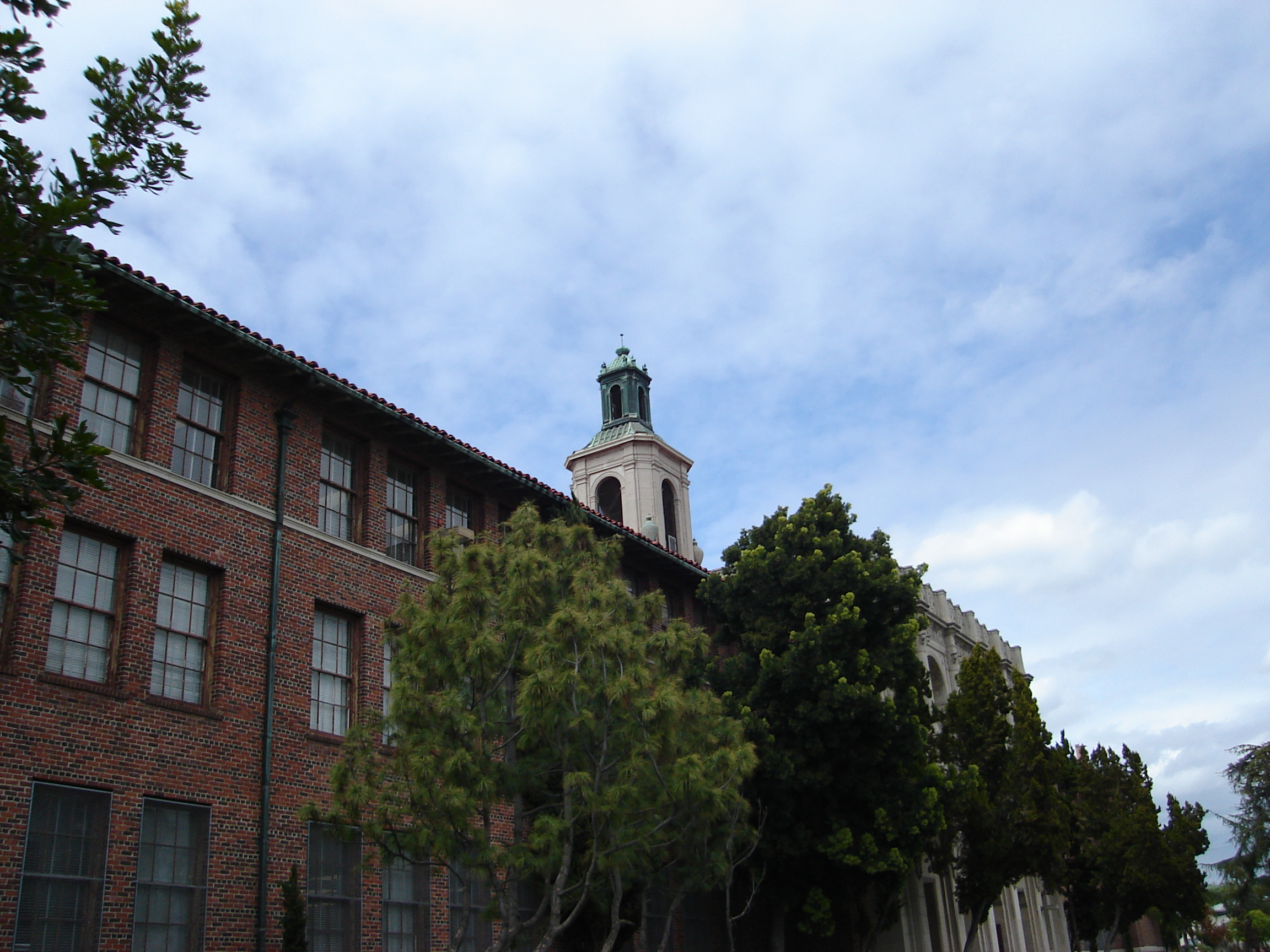
Hamilton High School

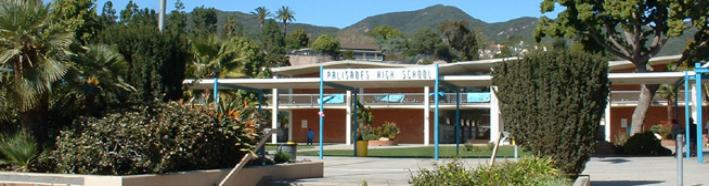
Palisades Charter High School

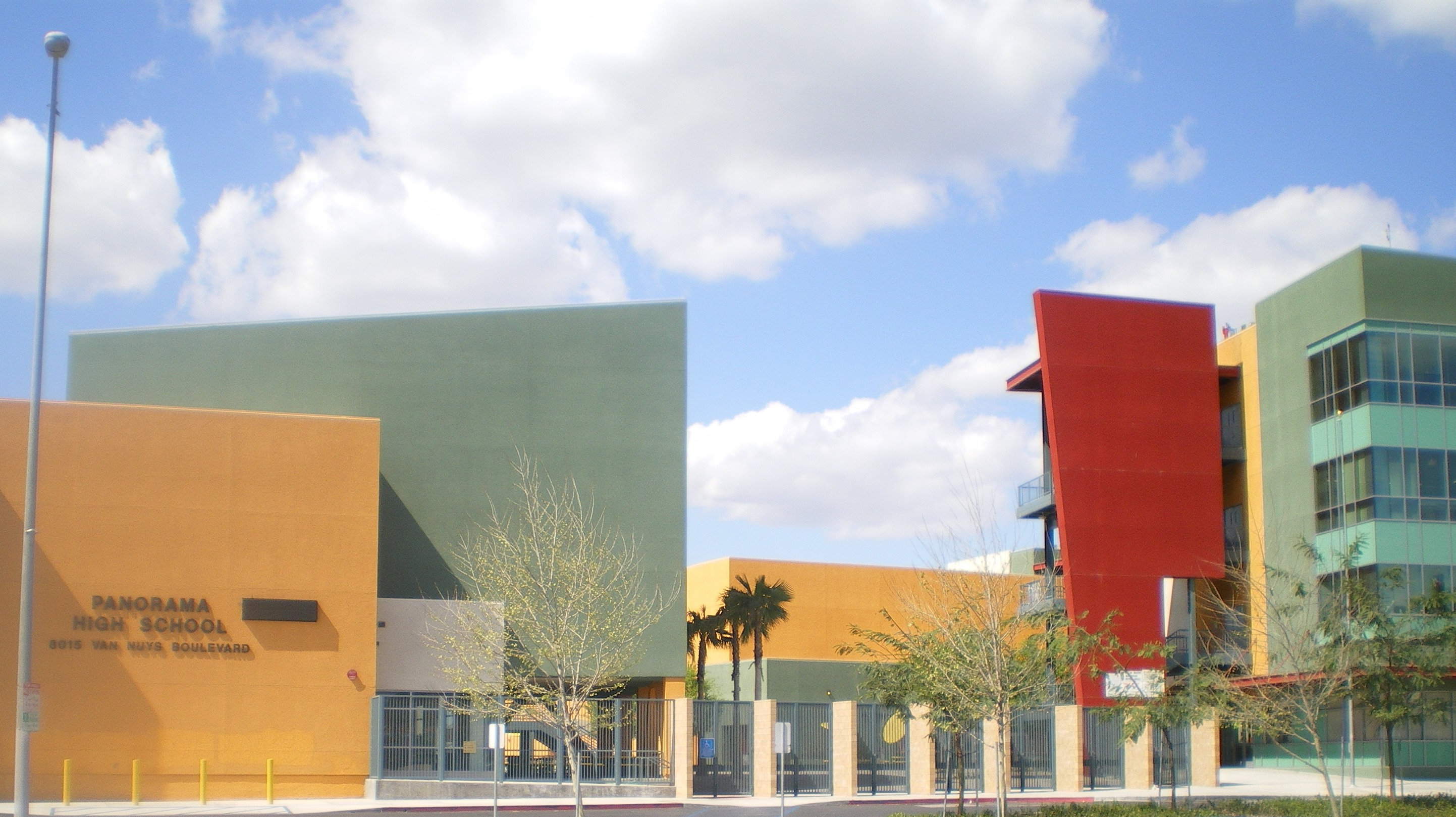
Panorama High School

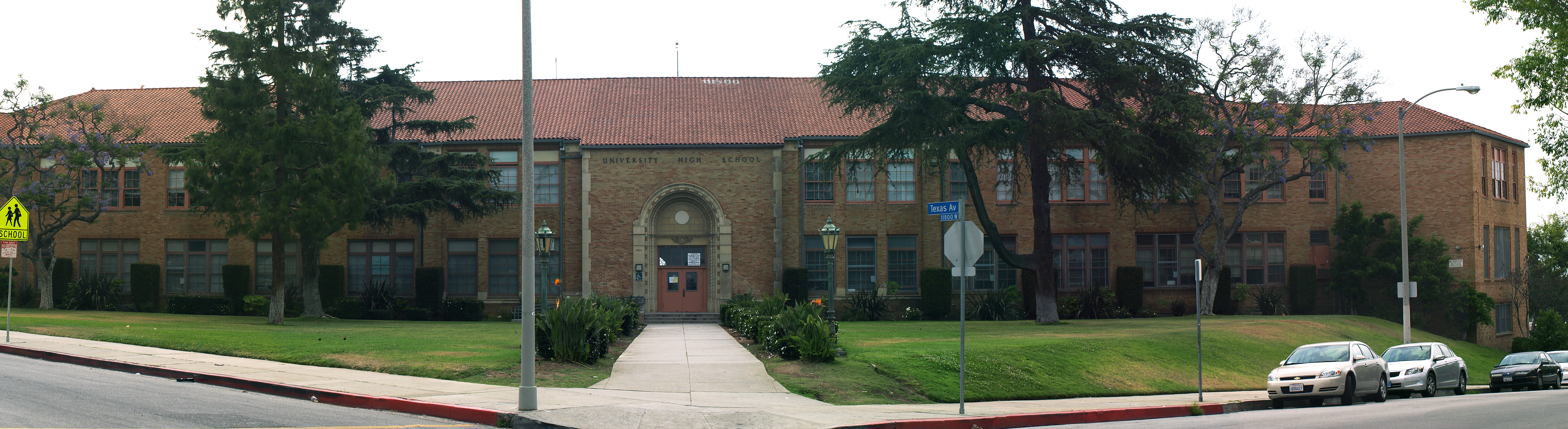
University High School

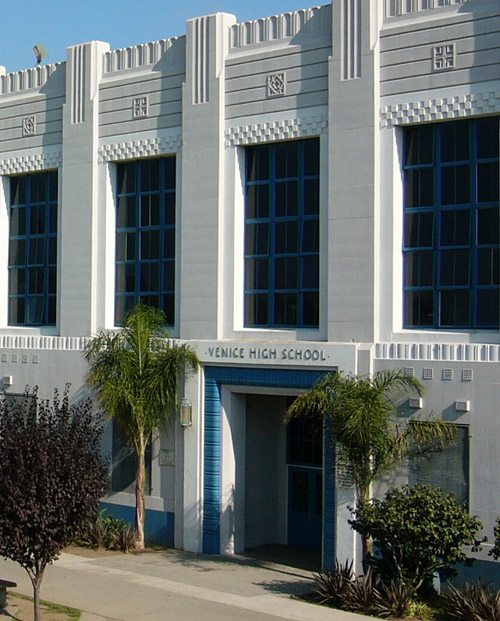
Venice High School

- Nava College Preparatory Academy (Los Angeles, opened 2014) (Knights)
- Dr. Maya Angelou Community High School (Los Angeles, opened 2011) (Wolfpack)
- Arleta High School (opened 2006 ) (Mustangs)
- Phineas Banning High School (Wilmington, opened 1926) (Pilots)
- Bell High School (Bell, opened 1925) (Eagles)
- Belmont High School (Los Angeles, opened 1923; became a 6–12 school () (Sentinels)
- Helen Bernstein High School (Hollywood, opened 2008) ) (Dragons)
- Birmingham High School (Van Nuys, opened 1952; became a charter school in 2009) (Patriots)
- Canoga Park High School (opened 1915) (Hunters)
- Carson High School (Carson, opened 1963) (Colts)
- César Chávez High School (San Fernando, California), (opened 2011) ) (Eagles)
- Chatsworth High School (opened 1963) (Chancellors)
- Grover Cleveland High School (Reseda, opened 1959) (Cavaliers)
- Miguel Contreras Learning Complex (Los Angeles, opened 2006) ) (The area around Contreras is zoned to Belmont High School.) (Cobras)
- Crenshaw High School (Los Angeles, opened 1968) (Cougars)
- Susan Miller Dorsey High School (Los Angeles, opened 1937) (Dons/Donnas)
- Charles Drew MS University Pathways Public Service Academy (Los Angeles, opened 2018)
- Mervyn M. Dymally High School (Los Angeles, opened 2012) (Challengers)
- Early College Academy - LA Trade Tech College (Los Angeles, opened 2013) (Lions)
- East Valley High School (North Hollywood, opened 2006) ) (Falcons)
- El Camino Real Charter High School (Woodland Hills, opened 1969; became a charter school in 2011) (Conquistadores)
- Esteban Torres High School (East Los Angeles, opened 2010) (Toros)
- Fairfax High School (Los Angeles, opened 1924) (Lions)
- Benjamin Franklin High School (Highland Park, opened 1916) (Panthers)
- John C. Fremont High School (Florence, LA, opened 1924) (Pathfinders)
- Gardena High School (Gardena/Harbor Gateway, opened 1901) (Panthers)
- James A. Garfield High School (East Los Angeles, opened 1925) (Bulldogs)
- Granada Hills Charter High School (opened 1960; became a charter school in 2003) (Highlanders)
- Ulysses S. Grant High School (Van Nuys, opened 1959) (Lancers)
- Dr. Richard A. Vladovic Harbor Teacher Preparation Academy (Wilmington, opened 2002) (Monarchs)
- Hollywood High School (opened 1903) (Sheiks)
- Alexander Hamilton High School (Los Angeles, opened 1931) (Yankees)
- Augustus F. Hawkins High School (Los Angeles, opened 2012) (Hawks)
- Huntington Park High School (Huntington Park, opened 1909) (Spartans)
- Hilda Learning Solis Academy (Los Angeles, California, opened 2012)
- Thomas Jefferson High School (South Central LA, opened 1916) (Democrats)
- Jordan High School (Watts, LA, opened 1923) (Bulldogs)
- John F. Kennedy High School (Granada Hills, opened 1971) (Cougars)
- Robert F. Kennedy Community Schools (Los Angeles, opened 2010) (K-12) (Bobcats)
- Legacy High School Complex (South Gate, opened 2012) (Tigers)
- Abraham Lincoln High School (Lincoln Heights, opened 1878) (Tigers)
- Alain Leroy Locke College Preparatory Academy (Broadway-Manchester/Green Meadows, LA, opened 1967) (Saints)
- Los Angeles High School (opened 1873) (Romans)
- Manual Arts High School (Los Angeles, opened 1910) (Toilers)
- Linda Esperanza Marquez High School, (Huntington Park, opened 2011) (Gladiators)
- John Marshall High School (Los Angeles, opened 1931) (Barristers)
- Felicitas and Gonzalo Mendez High School (Boyle Heights, opened 2009) (Jaguars)
- James Monroe High School (North Hills, opened 1958) (Vikings)
- Narbonne High School (Harbor City, opened 1925) (Gauchos)
- North Hollywood High School (opened 1927) (Huskies)
  - Highly Gifted Magnet
- Northridge Academy High School (opened 2004) (Pumas)
- Palisades Charter High School (Pacific Palisades, opened 1961) (Dolphins)
- Panorama High School (Panorama City, opened 2006 ) (Pythons)
- John H. Francis Polytechnic High School (Sun Valley, LA; opened 1897 in Downtown Los Angeles, renamed 1935, moved to San Fernando Valley 1957) (Parrots)
- Ramón C. Cortines School of Visual and Performing Arts (Los Angeles, opened 2009)
- Reseda Charter High School (opened 1955) (Regents)
- Diego Rivera Learning Complex (Los Angeles, opened 2011) (Huskies)
- Roosevelt High School (Los Angeles, opened 1922) (Teddy Bears, Rough Riders)
- Edward R. Roybal Learning Center (Los Angeles, opened 2008) (Titans)
- San Fernando High School (Pacoima [Los Angeles], opened 1896) (Tigers)
- San Pedro High School (opened 1898) (Pirates)
  - San Pedro High School Olguin Campus (opened 2012)
- Santee Education Complex (Los Angeles, opened 2005 ) (Falcons)
- Sonia M. Sotomayor Learning Academies (Los Angeles, opened 2011) (Wolves)
- South East High School (South Gate, opened 2005 ) (Jaguars)
- South Gate High School (South Gate, opened 1932) (Rams)
- Sylmar High School (Sylmar, opened 1961) (Spartans)
- William Howard Taft Charter High School (Woodland Hills, opened 1960) (Toreadors)
- University High School (Los Angeles, opened 1924) (Wildcats)
- Valley Academy of Arts and Sciences (Granada Hills, opened 2011) (Vipers)
- Van Nuys High School (opened 1915) (Wolves)
- Venice High School (opened 1911, current location 1925) (Gondoliers)
- Verdugo Hills High School (Tujunga, opened 1937) (Dons)
- Washington Preparatory High School (Westmont, opened 1927) (Generals)
- West Adams Preparatory High School (Los Angeles, opened 2007) (Panthers)
- Westchester Enriched Sciences Magnets (Los Angeles, opened 1948) (Comets)
- Wilson High School (Los Angeles, opened 1969) (Mighty Mules)

==== Gallery of high schools ====
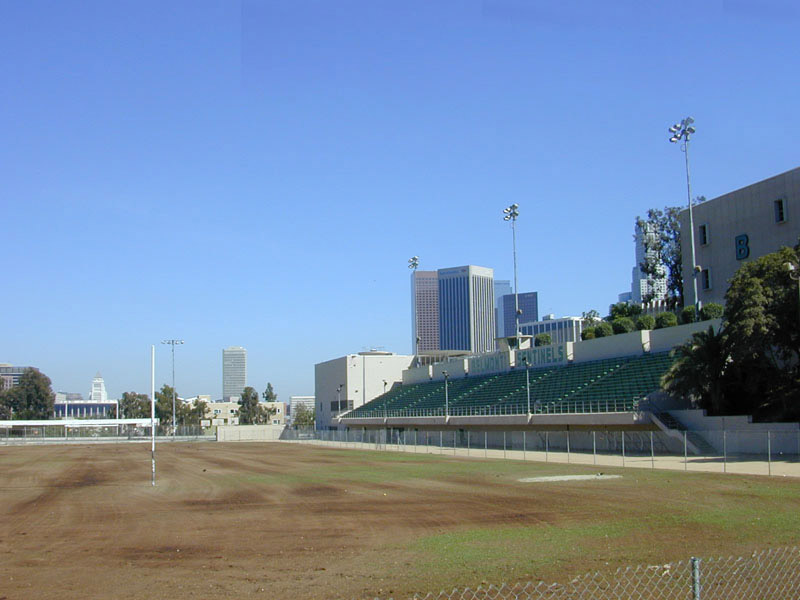
Belmont High School

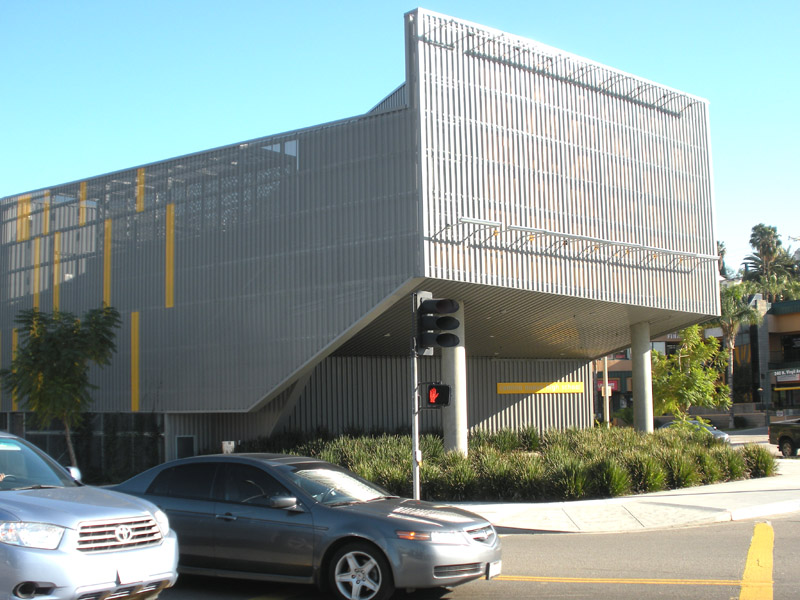
Camino Nuevo High School

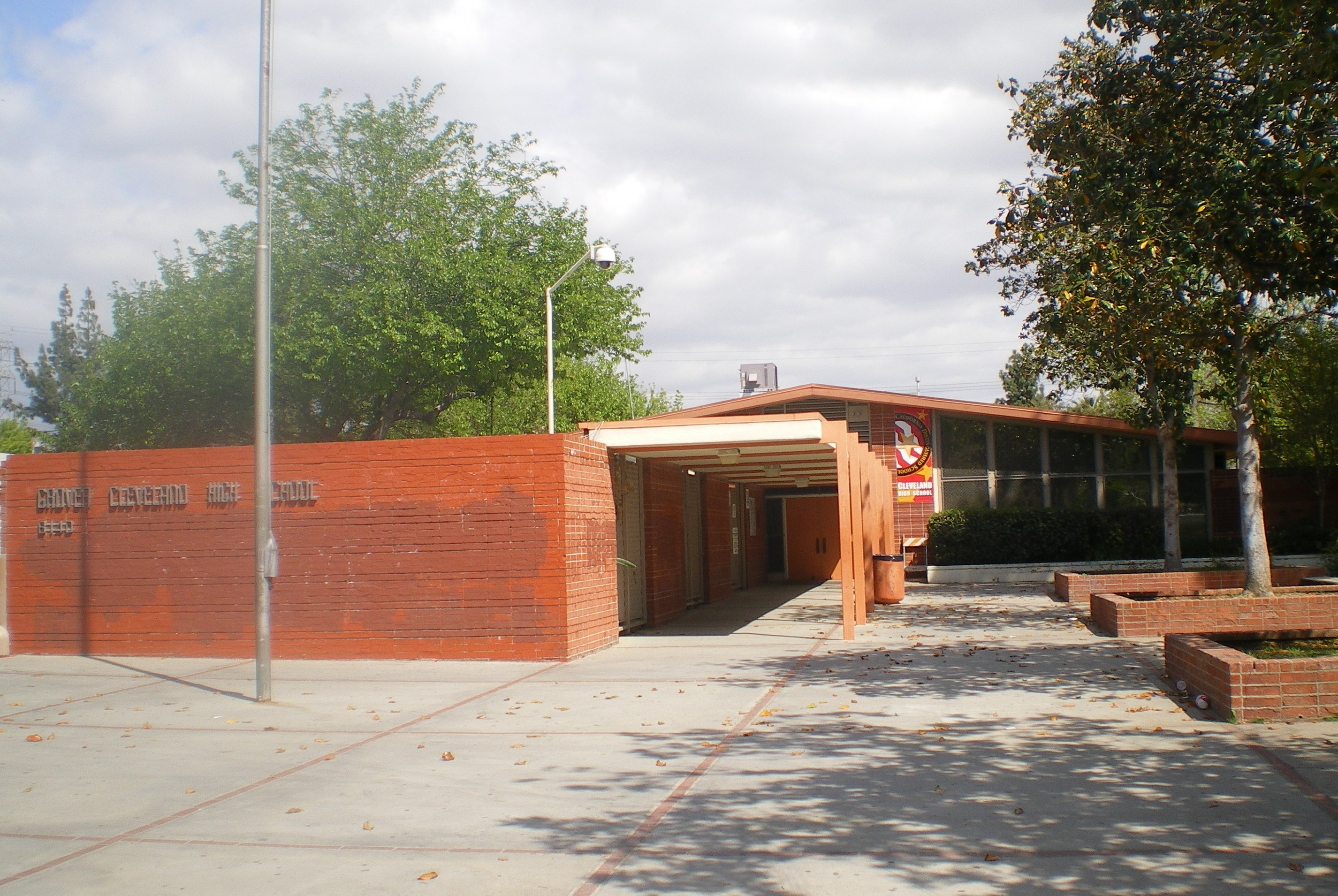
Grover Cleveland High School

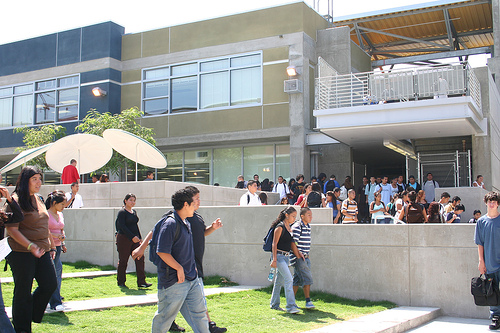
Miguel Contreras Learning Complex

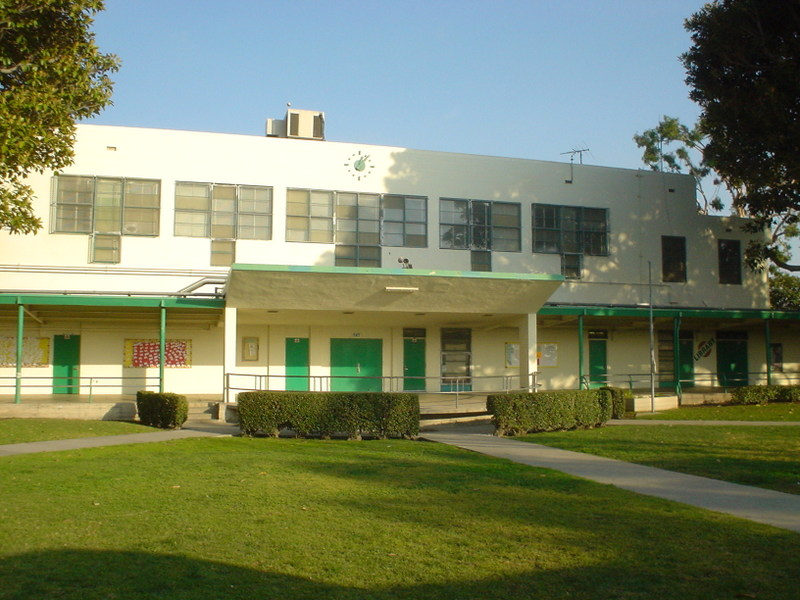
Dorsey High School

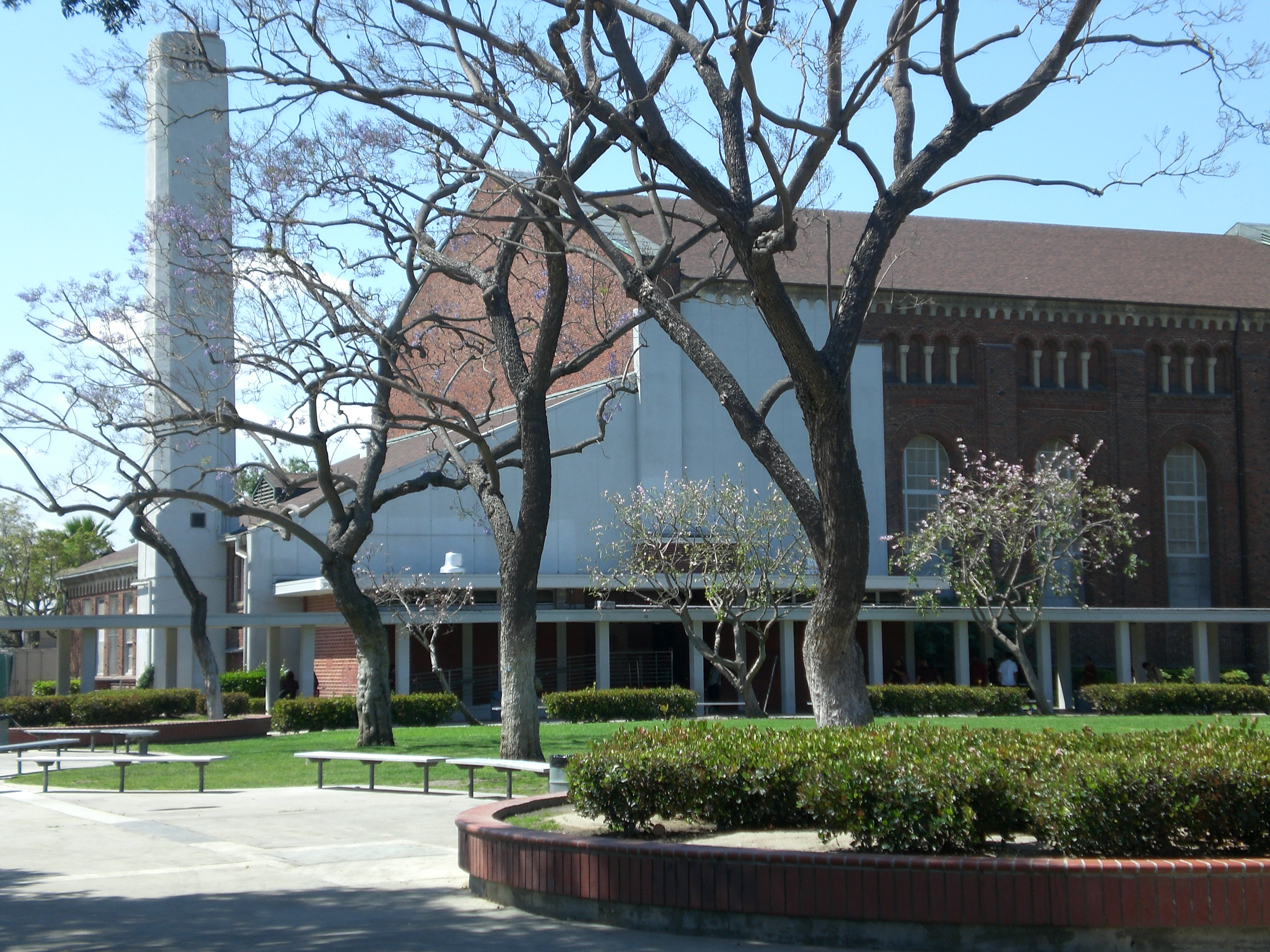
John C. Fremont High School

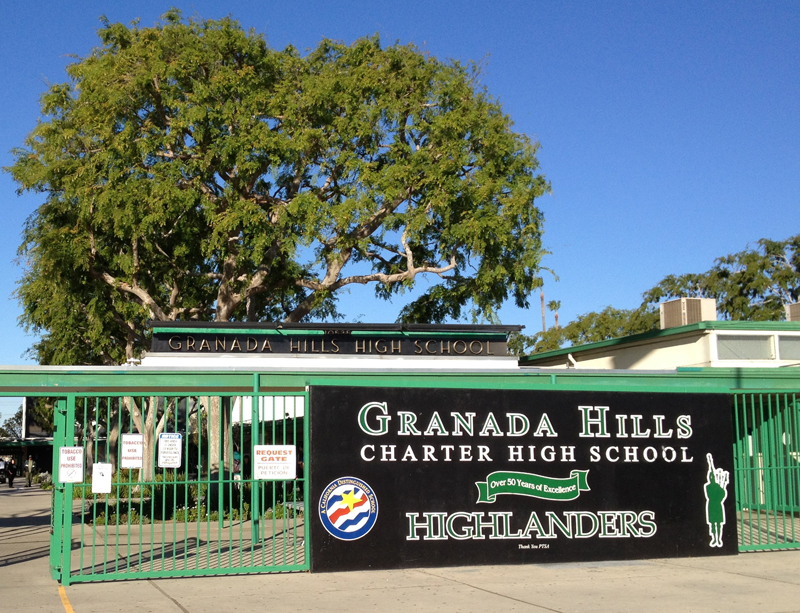
Granada Hills Charter High School

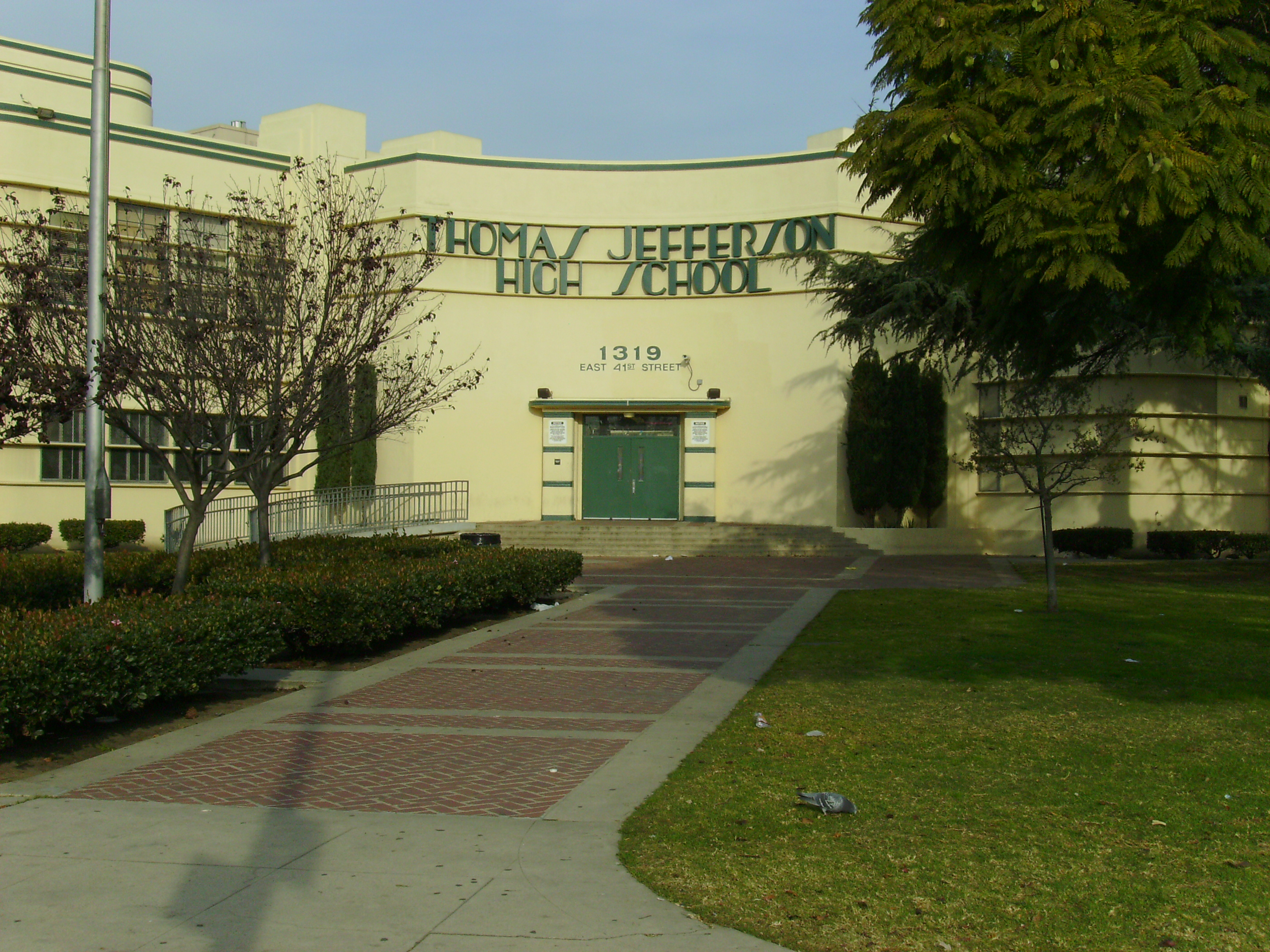
Thomas Jefferson High School

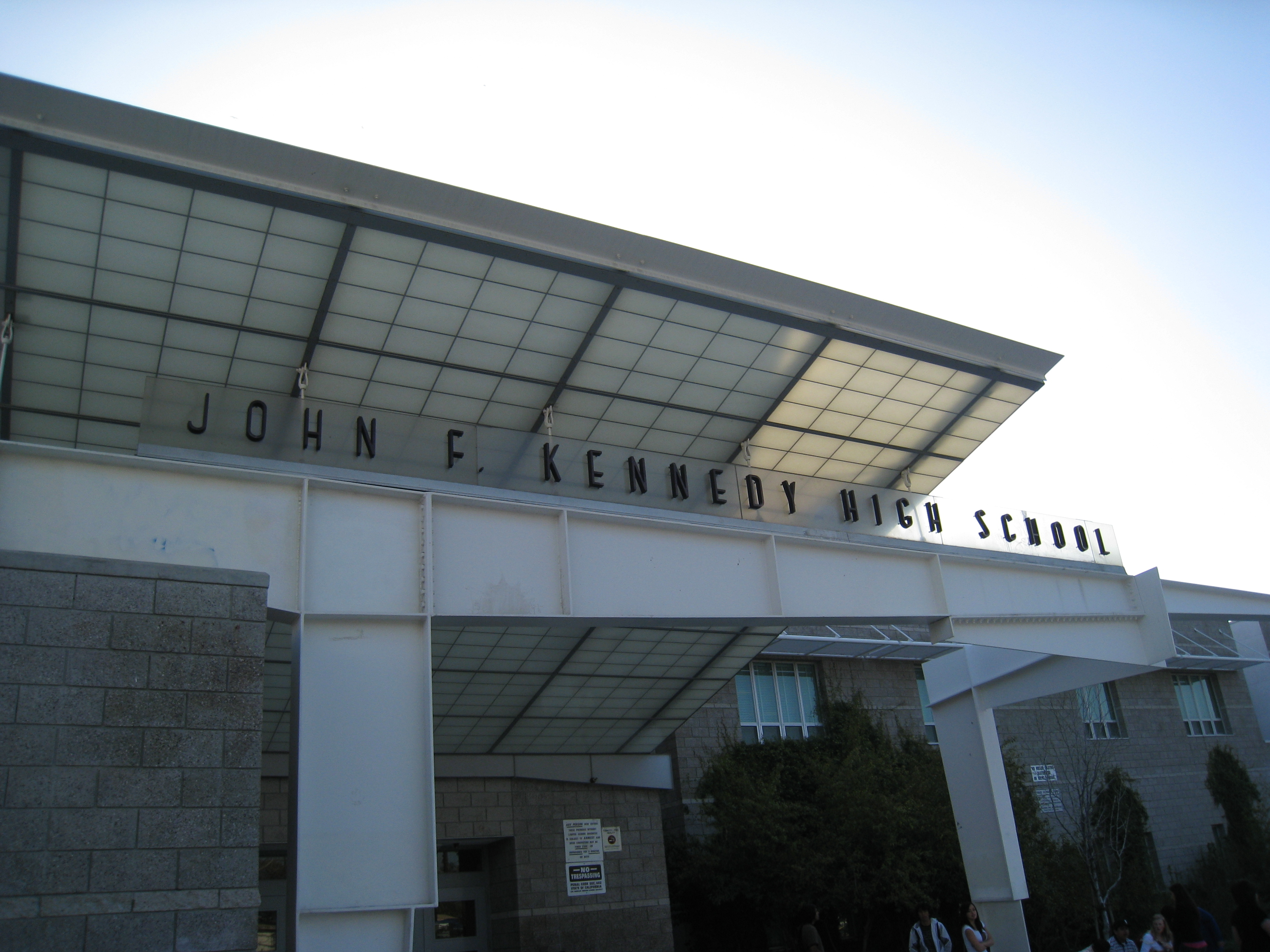
John F. Kennedy High School

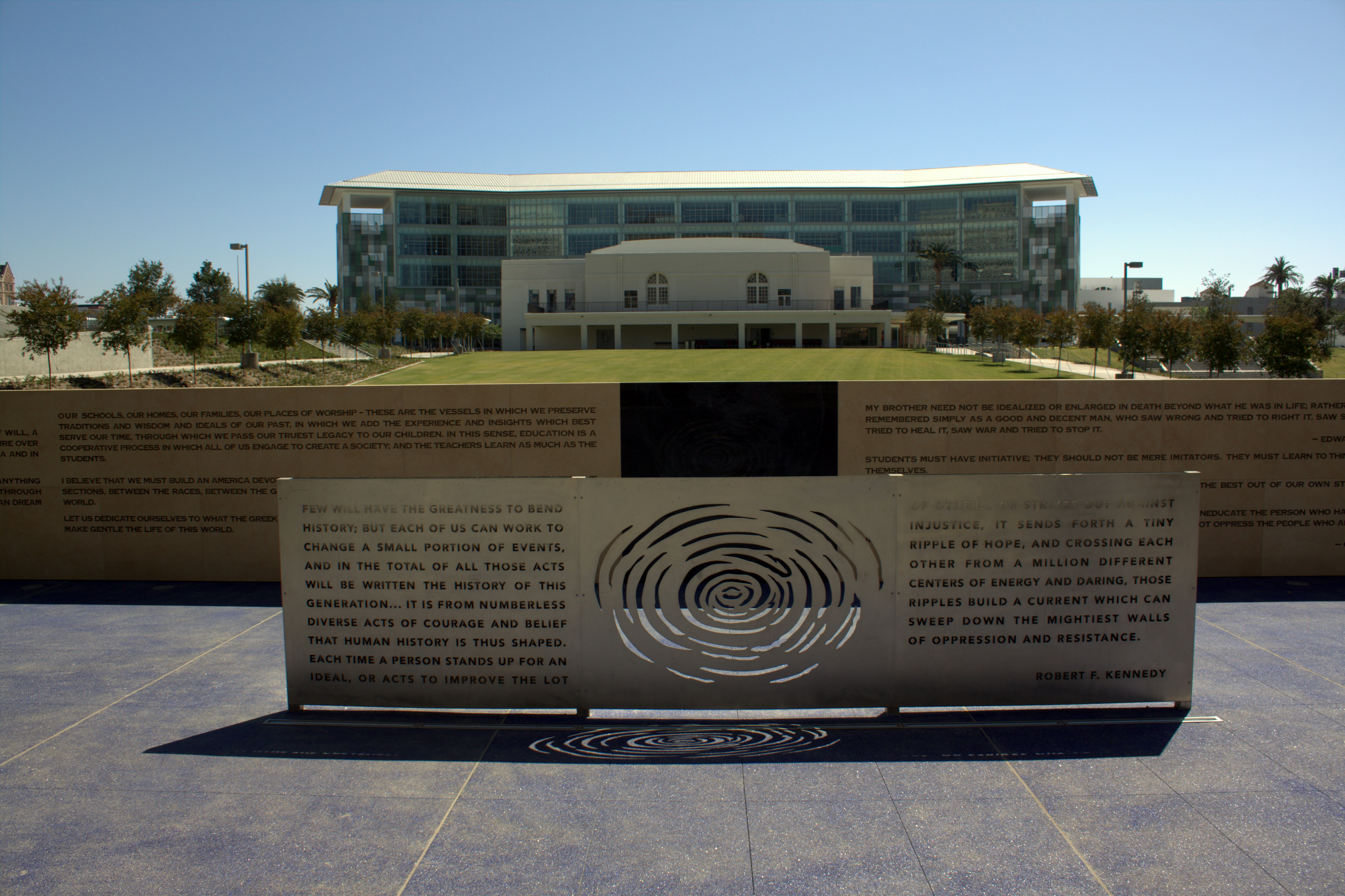
Robert F. Kennedy Community Schools

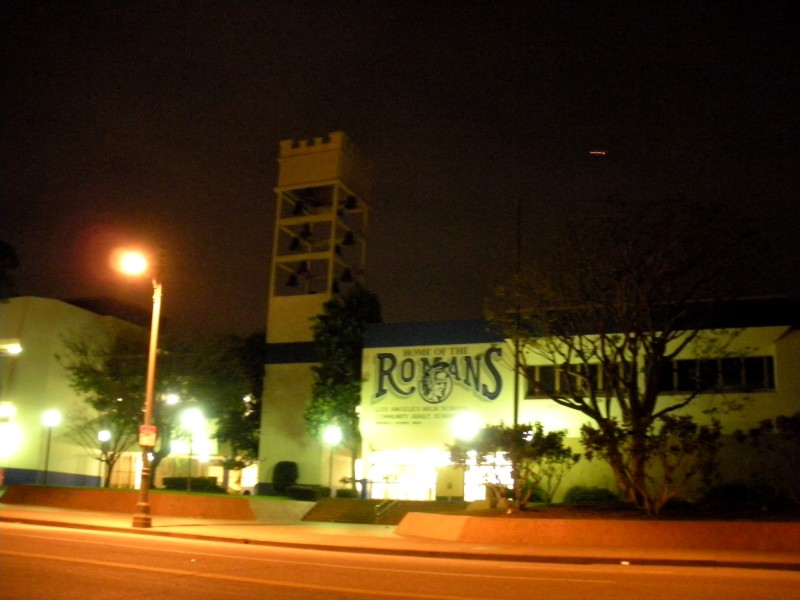
Los Angeles High School

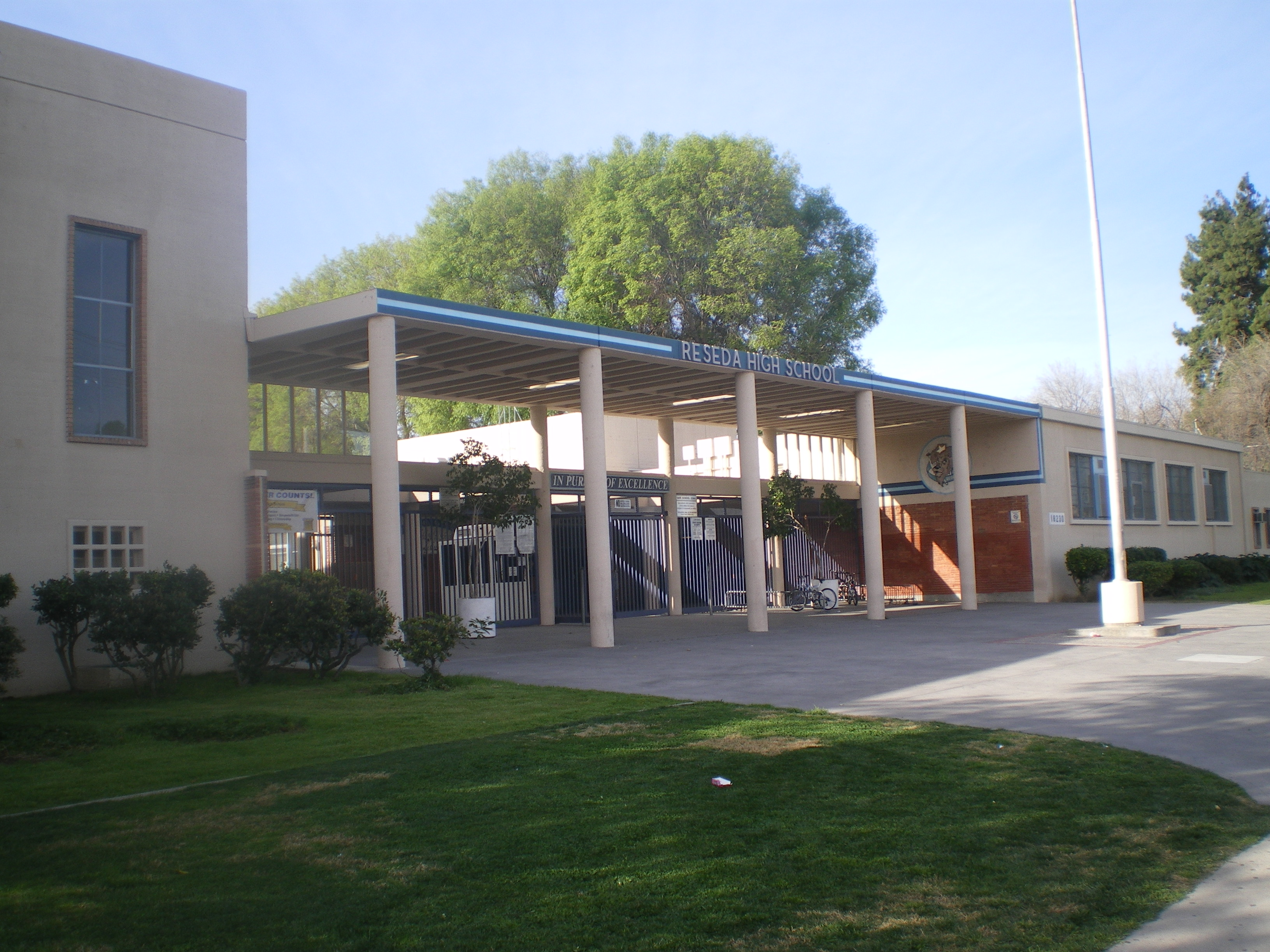
Reseda High School

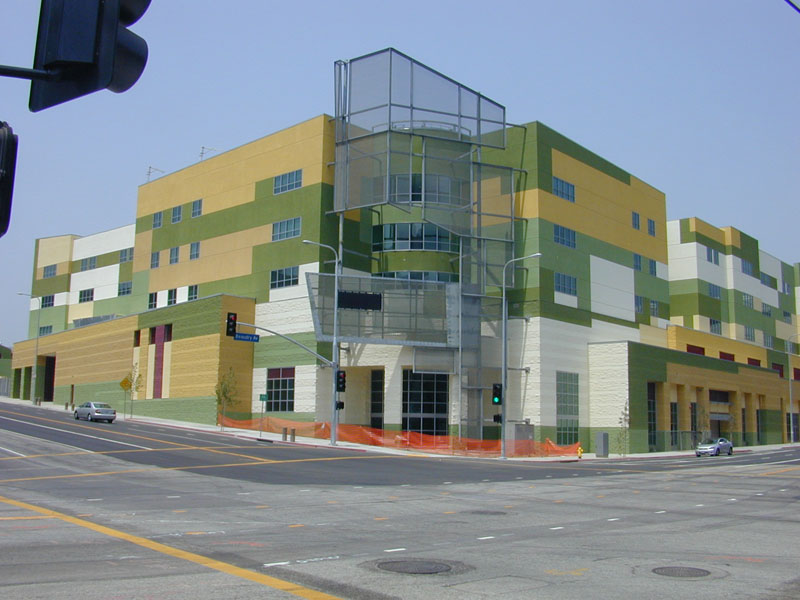
Edward R. Roybal Learning Center

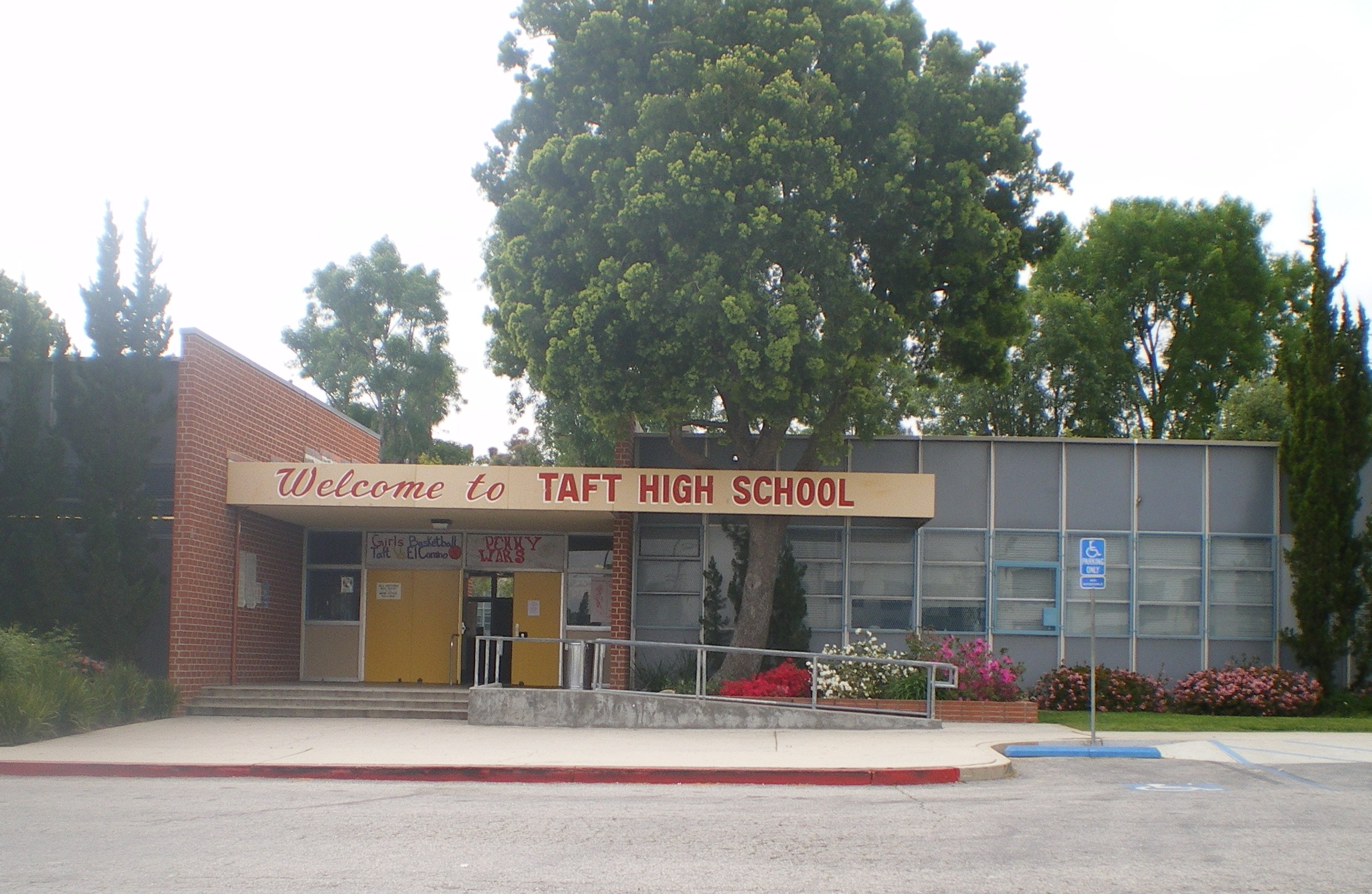
William Howard Taft High School

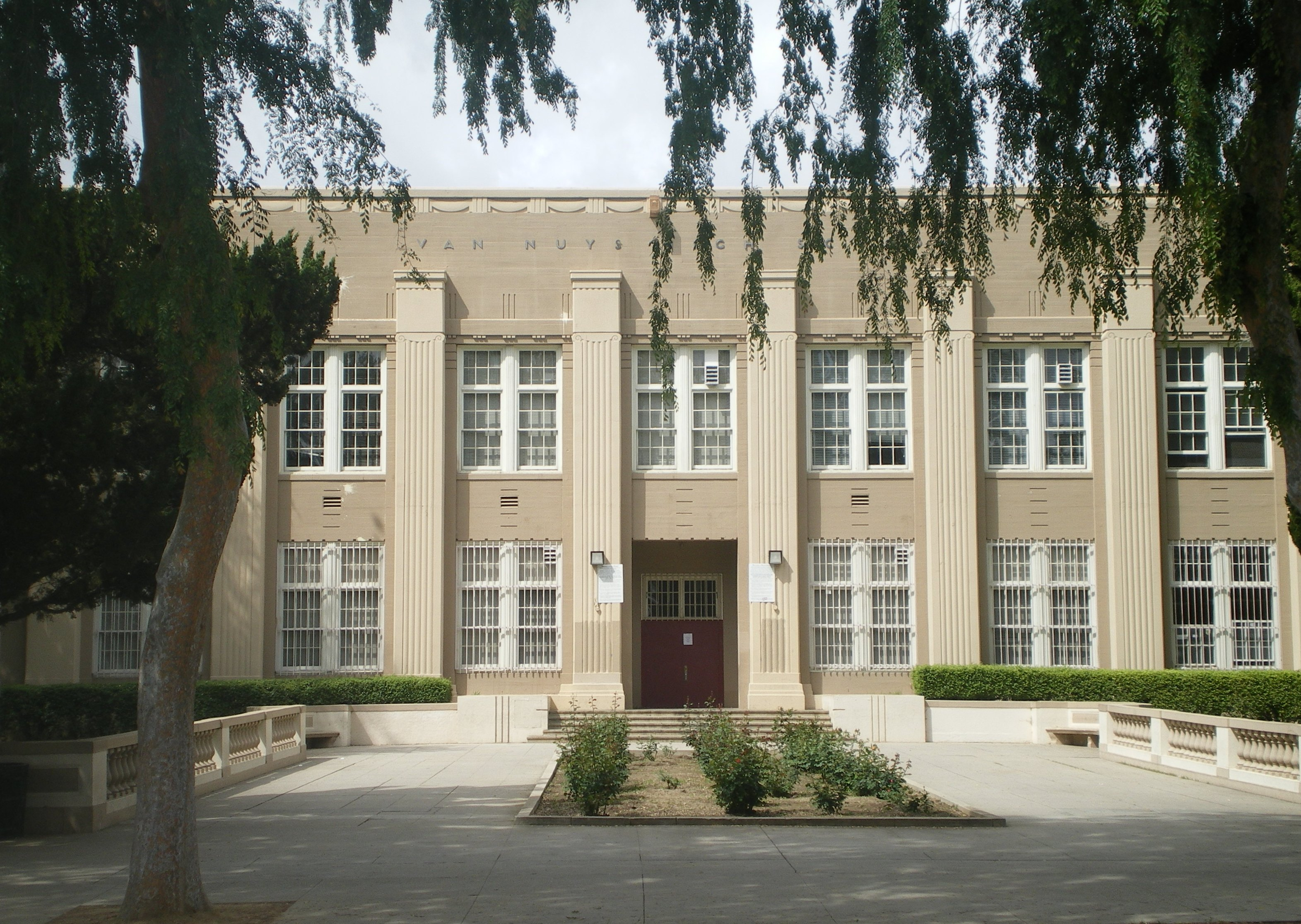
Van Nuys High School

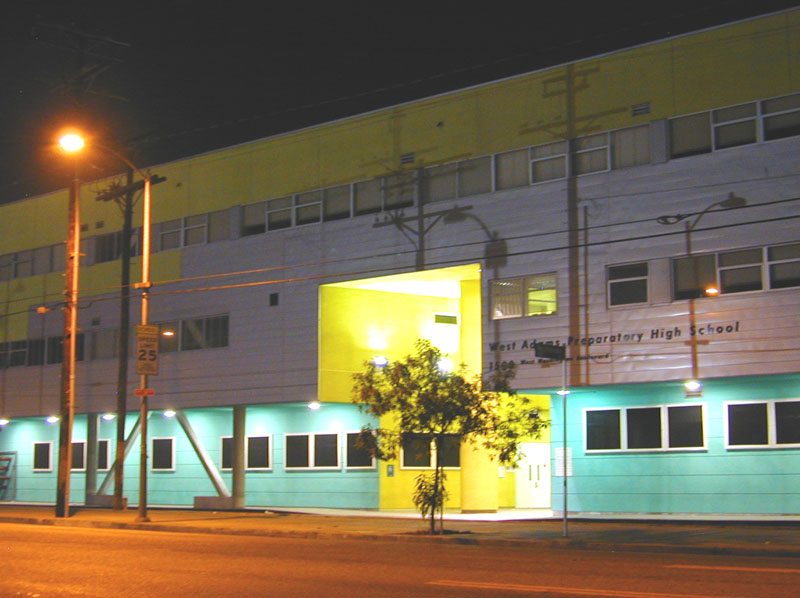
West Adams Preparatory High School

=== Continuation high schools ===
- Jane Addams High School
- Angel's Gate High School
- Avalon High School (Wilmington, adjacent to Banning)
- Boyle Heights High School
- Cal Burke High School
- Central High School (Continuation High School)
- Cheviot Hills High School
- Eagle Tree Continuation High School
- Earhart High School
- Einstein High School (Continuation High School)
- Ellington High School (Westmont, adjacent to Washington)
- Evergreen High School (Continuation High School)
- Frida Kahlo High School
- Grey High School
- Highland Park High School (adjacent to Franklin)
- Hope High School (California)
- Independence High School (Continuation High School)
- John R. Wooden High School
- Lewis High School (Sun Valley, LA, adjacent to Polytechnic)
- London High School (Los Angeles)
- Metropolitan High School
- Mission High School (Continuation High School)
- Moneta High School
- Monterey High School (Continuation High School)
- Mt. Lukens High School
- Newmark High School
- Odyssey High School
- Owensmouth High School
- Patton High School
- Phoenix High School (Continuation High School)
- Pueblo de Los Angeles High School
- Rodia High School
- Rogers High School (Continuation High School)
- San Antonio High School
- Stoney Point High School
- Thoreau High School
- View Park Continuation High School
- Walt Whitman High School
- Young High School

==== Alternative high schools ====
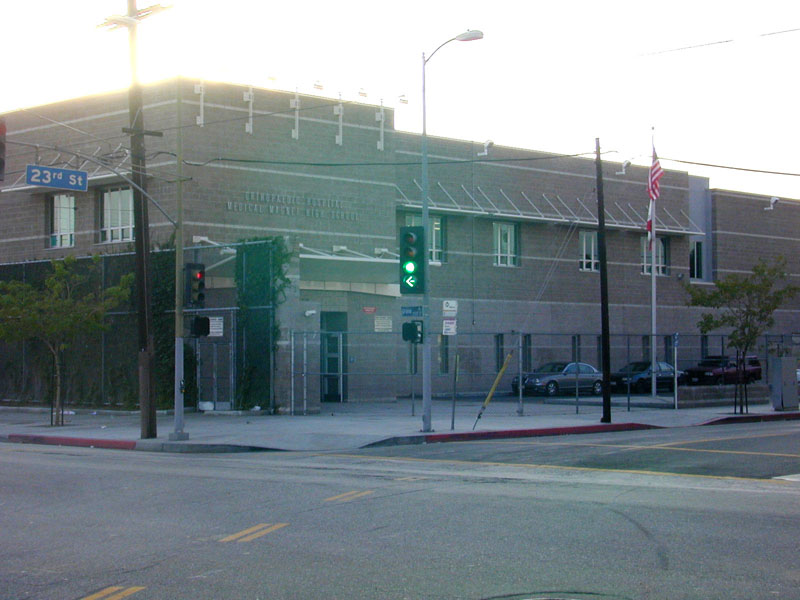
Orthopaedic Hospital Medical Magnet High School

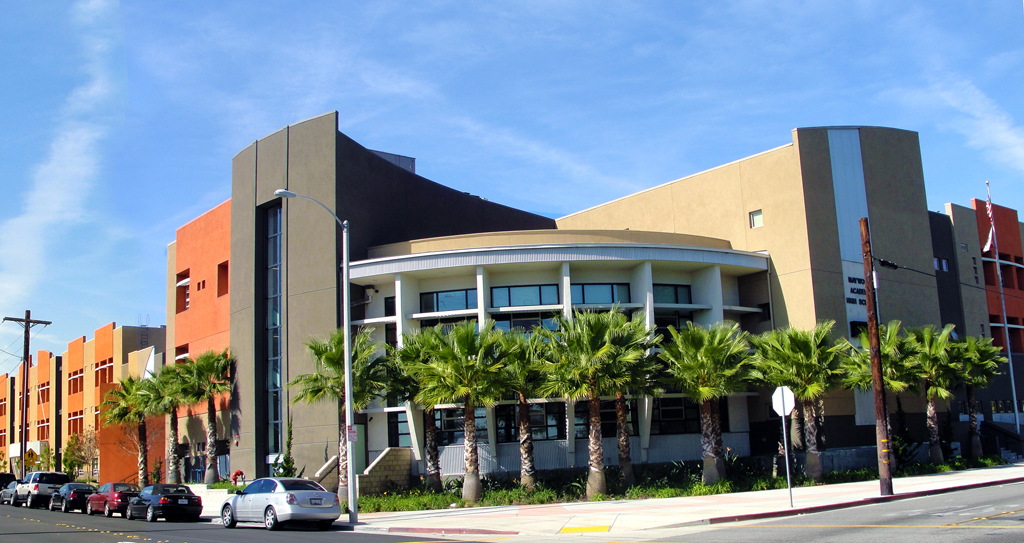
Maywood Academy High School

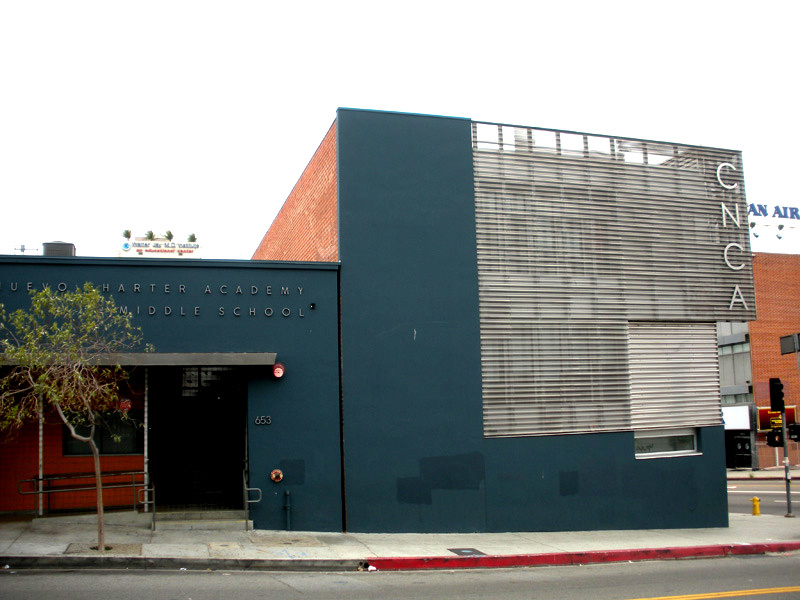
Camino Nuevo Charter Academy

- Animo Locke Technology High School
- Animo South Los Angeles (Westmont)
- Ánimo Venice Charter High School
- Francisco Bravo Medical Magnet High School
- California Academy for LS
- Camino Nuevo Charter Academy
- Central City Value
- College Ready Academy High School
- Crenshaw Arts Technical
- Daniel Pearl Magnet High School
- De La Hoya Animo High School
- Downtown Magnets High School
- Discovery Charter Preparatory
- East Los Angeles Renaissance Academy
- Ramón C. Cortines High School for the Visual and Performing Arts, opened September 2009
- High Tech Los Angeles
- King/Drew Magnet High School of Medicine and Science
- Maywood Academy High School (Maywood, opened 2006 )
- Felicitas and Gonzalo Mendez High School (formerly East Los Angeles New High School 1) (opened 2009 )
- Middle College High School
- Orthopaedic Hospital Medical Magnet High School
- Renaissance Academy (Eagle Rock, LA)
- Vaughn Next Century Learning Center
- View Park Preparatory Accelerated High School
- J.P. Widney High School
- Port of Los Angeles High School
- New Designs Charter School

== Middle schools (grades 6–8) ==
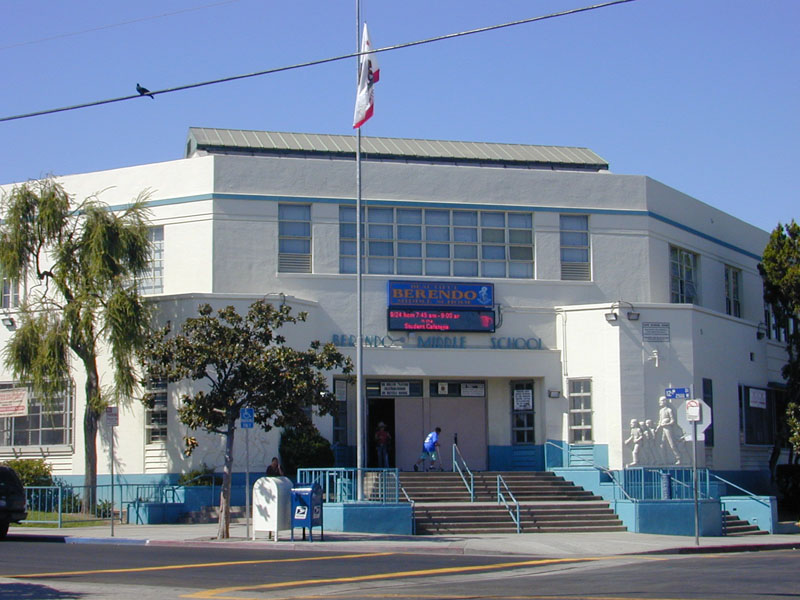
Berendo Middle School

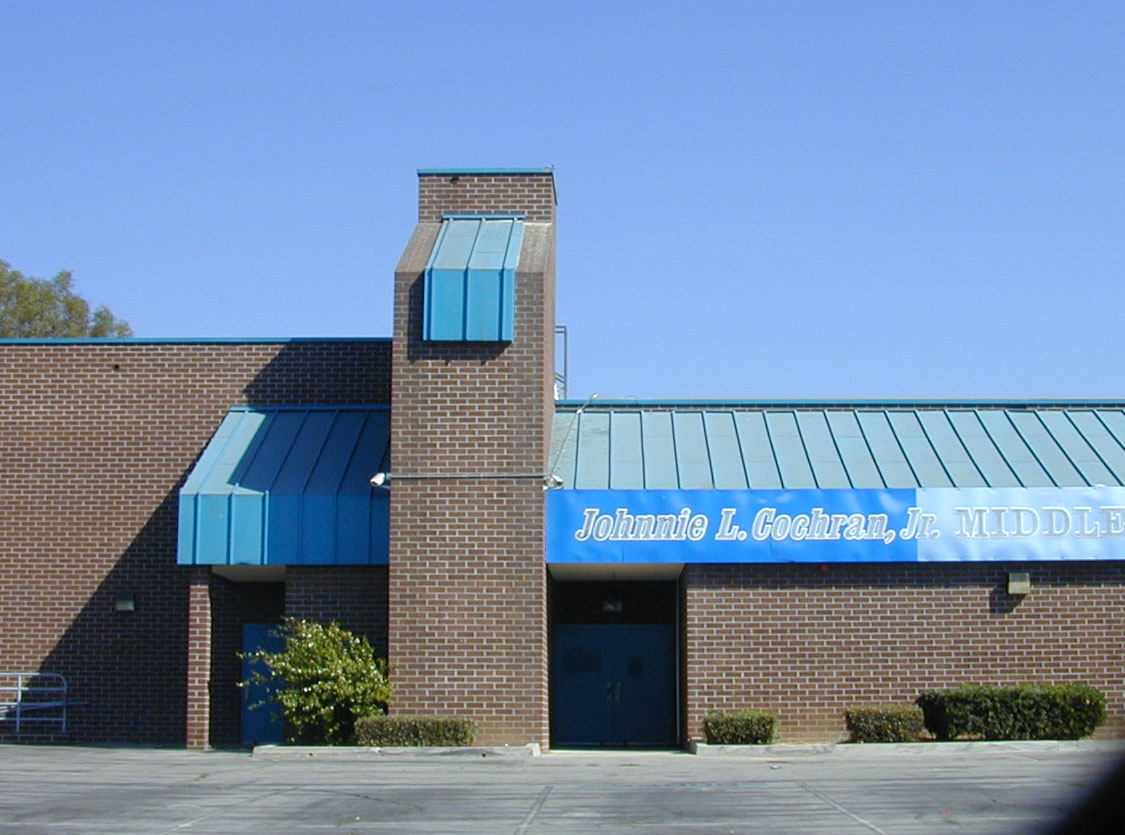
Johnnie L. Cochran Jr. Middle School (formerly Mt. Vernon Jr. High)

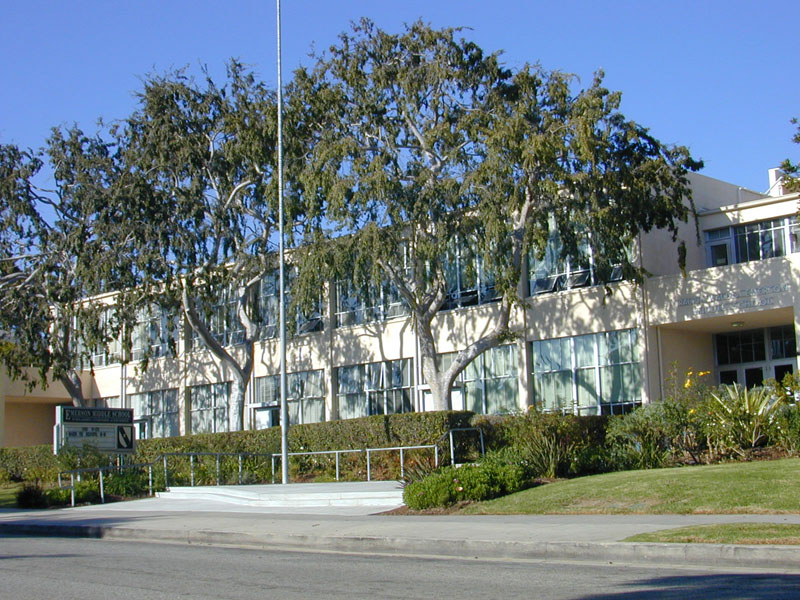
Emerson Middle School

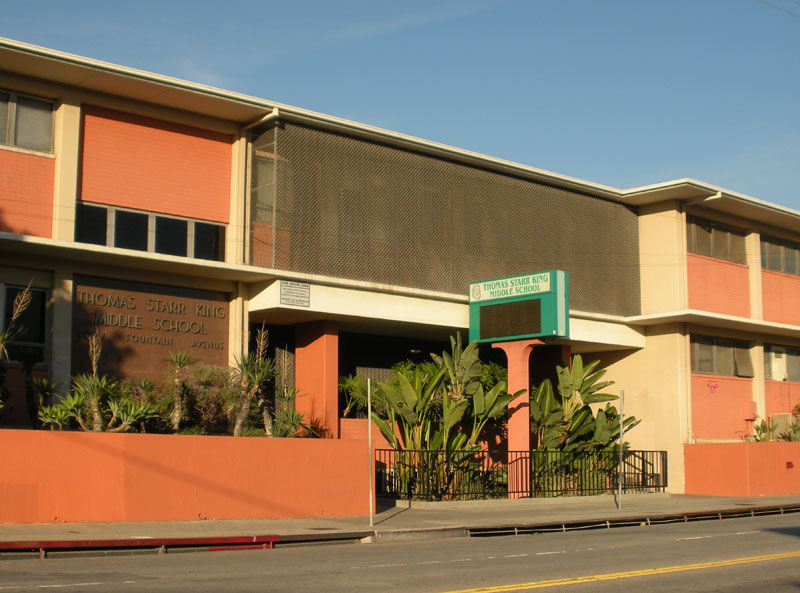
Thomas Starr King Middle School

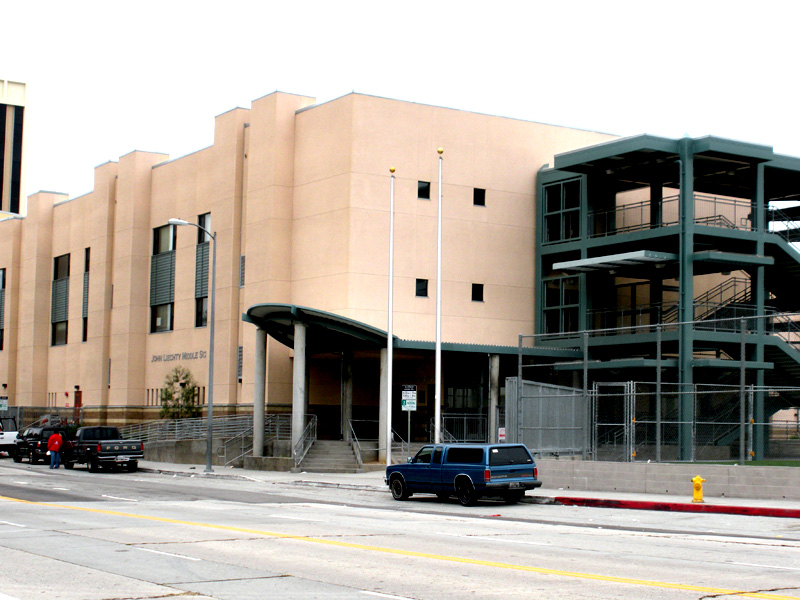
John H. Liechty Middle School

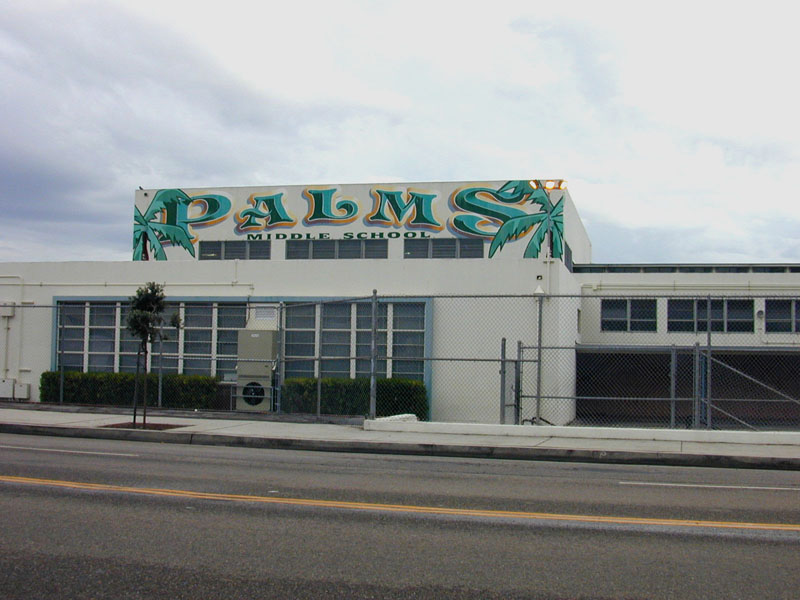
Palms Middle School

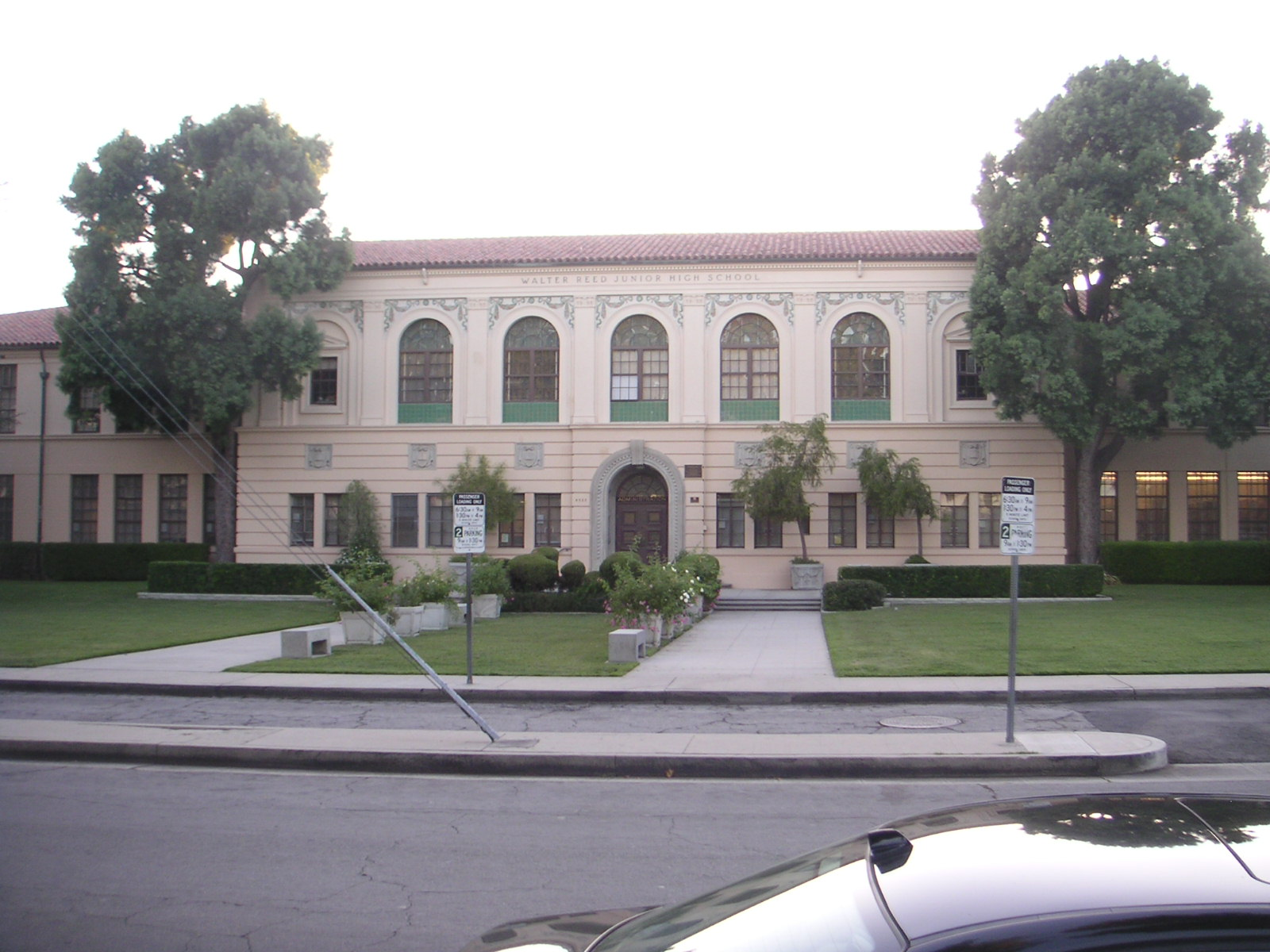
Walter Reed Middle School

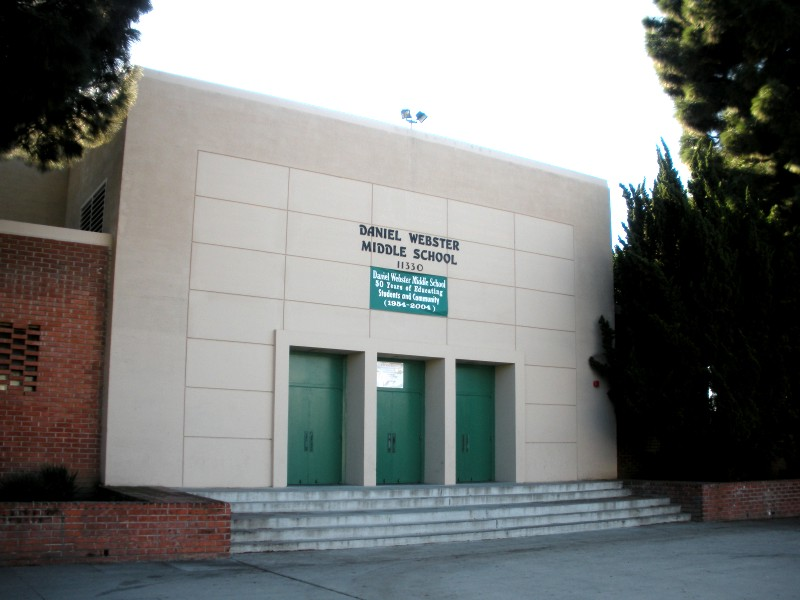
Daniel Webster Middle School

=== Zoned middle schools ===
- John Adams Middle School, South Central, LA (Patriots)
- Dr.Julian Nava Learning Academy
- Audubon Middle School (Los Angeles) (Eagles)
- Hubert Howe Bancroft Middle School (Los Angeles) – established 1929, contains a Performing Arts Magnet and a STE[+a]M Magnet (Cougars)
- Belvedere Middle School (East Los Angeles) (Olympians)
- Berendo Middle School (Los Angeles) (Crusaders)
- Dr. Mary McLeod Bethune Middle School, Florence, LA (Mighty Mustangs)
- Luther Burbank Middle School (Los Angeles) (Bears)
- John Burroughs Middle School (Los Angeles) (Bears)
- Richard E. Byrd Middle School (Sun Valley, LA) (A new campus for Byrd was completed in 2008) (Penguins)
- Andrew Carnegie Middle School (Carson) (Highlanders)
- Dr. George Washington Carver Middle School, South Park/South Central, LA (Cougars)
- William Jefferson Clinton Middle School, South Central, LA (opened 2006 ) (Eagles)
- Johnnie L. Cochran Jr. Middle School (Los Angeles) – (formerly Mount Vernon Middle School) (Cougars)
- Canoga Park Middle School (Los Angeles) (Explorers)
- Glenn Hammond Curtiss Middle School (Carson) (Pilots)
- Richard Henry Dana Middle School (Los Angeles) (Mariners)
- Rudecinda Sepulveda Dodson Middle School (Los Angeles) (Dolphins)
- Charles R. Drew Middle School, Florence-Firestone (Cougars)
- Thomas A. Edison Middle School, Florence-Firestone (Eagles)
- El Sereno Middle School (Los Angeles) (Jaguars)
- Emerson Community Charter School (Los Angeles) (Panthers)
- Alexander Fleming Middle School (Lomita) (Falcons)
- Robert Frost Middle School (Los Angeles) (Timberwolves)
- Henry T. Gage Middle School (Huntington Park) (Spartans)
- Samuel Gompers Middle School, Broadway-Manchester, LA (Bulldogs)
- David Wark Griffith STEAM Magnet Middle School (East Los Angeles) (Bulldogs)
- George Ellery Hale Charter Academy (Los Angeles) (Huskies, formerly Comets)
- Bret Harte Preparatory Middle School, Vermont Vista, LA (Saints)
- Patrick Henry Middle School (Los Angeles) (Patriots)
- Hollenbeck Middle School (Los Angeles) (Junior Riders)
- Oliver Wendell Holmes International Middle School (Los Angeles) (Eagles)
- Washington Irving STEAM Magnet School (Los Angeles)
- Young Oak Kim Academy (Los Angeles) (opened 2009)
- Thomas Starr King Middle School (Los Angeles) (Lions)
- Ernest Lawrence Middle School (Los Angeles) (Lions)
- Joseph Le Conte Middle School (Los Angeles) (Eagles)
- John H. Liechty Middle School (Los Angeles) (opened 2007) (Sharks)
- Los Angeles Academy Middle School, South Park, LA (Lions)
- Charles Maclay Middle School (Los Angeles) (Proud Lions)
- James Madison Middle School (Los Angeles) (Bulldogs)
- Marina del Rey Middle School (Los Angeles)
- Mark Twain Middle School (Los Angeles)
- Edwin Markham Middle School, Watts, LA (Eagles)
- Robert A. Millikan Middle School (Los Angeles) (Turtles)
- Mount Gleason Middle School (Los Angeles) (Mustangs)
- John Muir Middle School (Los Angeles) (Cougars)
- William Mulholland Middle School (Los Angeles) (Cascaders)
- Florence Nightingale Middle School (Los Angeles) (Nighthawks)
- Chester W. Nimitz Middle School (Huntington Park) (Seahawks)
- Alfred Bernhard Nobel Charter Middle School (Los Angeles) (Nighthawks)
- Northridge Middle School (Los Angeles) (Knights)
- Barack Obama Global Preparation Academy (Los Angeles) (Eagles)
- Olive Vista Middle School (Los Angeles) (Pandas)
- Pacoima Middle School (Los Angeles) (Pumas)
- Palms Middle School (Los Angeles) (Palms)
- Robert E. Peary Middle School (Los Angeles) (Huskies)
- Pio Pico Middle School- Formerly Pio Pico K-8 School (Los Angeles) (Porcupine)
- George K. Porter Middle School (Los Angeles) (Trojans)
- Gaspar De Portola Middle School
1. REDIRECT Gaspar De Portola Middle School

(Los Angeles)(Phoenixes)

- Walter Reed Middle School (Los Angeles) (Wolves)
- Paul Revere Charter Middle School (Los Angeles) (Riders)
- Roy Romer Middle School (Los Angeles) (opened 2008) (Rams)
- San Fernando Middle School (San Fernando) (Falcons)
- Sepulveda Middle School (Los Angeles) (Grizzlies)
- Southeast Middle School (South Gate, opened 2004) (Eagles)
- South Gate Middle School (South Gate, opened 1941) (Vikings)
- South Region Middle School #2 (Bell, opened 2010)
- South Region Middle School #6 (opened 2010)
- Robert Louis Stevenson Middle School (Los Angeles) (Pirates)
- Sun Valley Magnet School (Los Angeles) (Pioneers)
- John A. Sutter Middle School (Los Angeles) (Miners)
- Van Nuys Middle School (Los Angeles) (Mustangs)
- Virgil Middle School (Los Angeles) (Tigers)
- Vista Middle School (Los Angeles) (opened 2004) (Vaqueros) Cowboys In Spanish
- Daniel Webster Middle School (Los Angeles) (Owls)
- Daniel Webster STEAM Magnet Middle School (Los Angeles) (Owls)
- Stephen M. White Middle School (Carson) (Knights)
- Walnut Park Middle School (Walnut Park) (opened 2012) (Huskies)
- Wilmington Middle School STEAM Magnet (Los Angeles) (Jaguars)
- Woodland Hills Academy (Los Angeles) (Wolves)
- Orville Wright Middle School STEAM Magnet (Los Angeles)
- New Designs Charter School (Los Angeles) (Cardinals)

=== Alternative middle schools Magnet only ===
- North Valley Charter Academy

== Elementary schools ==
=== Zoned elementary schools ===
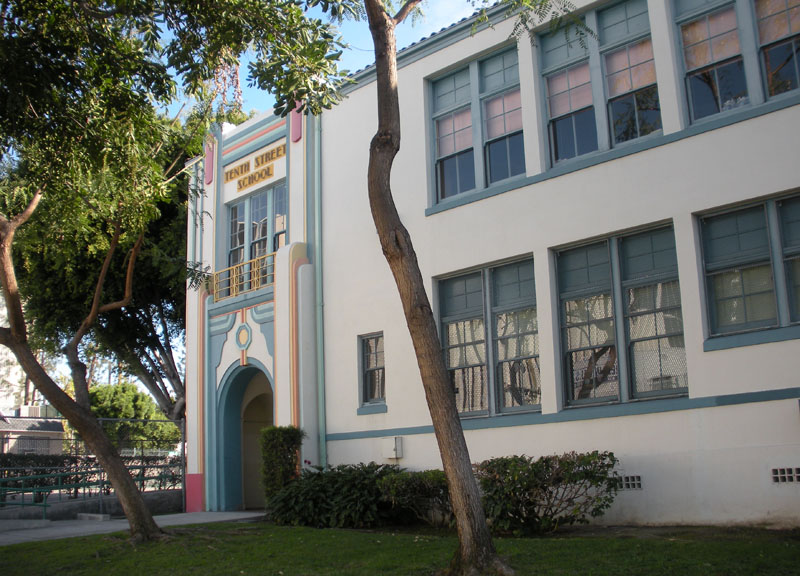
Tenth Street School

==== Numbers ====
- 1st Street Elementary School
- 2nd Street Elementary School
- 3rd Street Elementary School
- 4th Street Elementary School (East Los Angeles)
- 6th Avenue Elementary School
- 7th Street Elementary School
- 9th Street Elementary School
- 10th Street Elementary School (Eagles)
- 15th Street Elementary School
- 20th Street Elementary School, South Central (Dolphins)
- 24th Street Elementary School
- 28th Street Elementary School
- 42nd Street Elementary School
- 49th Street Elementary School, South Park (Tigers)
- 52nd Street Elementary School
- 54th Street Elementary School
- 59th Street Elementary School
- 61st Street Elementary School
- 66th Street Elementary School
- 68th Street Elementary School, Vermont-Slauson, LA
- 74th Street Elementary School
- 75th Street Elementary School, Florence, LA
- 92nd Street Elementary School
- 93rd Street Elementary School
- 95th Street Elementary School (Westmont)
- 96th Street Elementary School
- 99th Street Elementary School
- 107th Street Elementary School, Broadway-Manchester, LA
- 109th Street Elementary School, Green Meadows, LA
- 112th Street Elementary School, Watts, LA
- 116th Street Elementary School, Green Meadows, LA
- 118th Street Elementary School, Broadway-Manchester, LA
- 122nd Street Elementary School (Willowbrook)
- 135th Street Elementary School
- 153rd Street Elementary School
- 156th Street Elementary School
- 186th Street Elementary School
- 232nd Place Elementary School

==== A ====
- Albion Street Elementary School
- Aldama Elementary School
- Alexandria Avenue Elementary School
- Allesandro Elementary School
- Alta California Elementary School
- Alta Loma Elementary School
- Amanecer Primary Center (K–2) (opened 2005 , East Los Angeles)
- Ambler Avenue Elementary School
- Amestoy Elementary School
- Anatola Elementary School
- Andasol Avenue Elementary School
- Angeles Mesa Elementary School
- Ann Street Elementary School (Chinatown, 5th Oldest Elementary School in LAUSD, opened 1884.)
- Annalee Elementary School
- Annandale Elementary School (Eagle Rock/Annandale, LA)
- Anton, William R. Elementary School (Note: Hammel Street Elementary Demolished after school Moved to Anton.)
- Apperson Street Elementary School
- Aragon Avenue Elementary School
- Arlington Heights Elementary School
- Arminta Street Elementary School (Sun Valley, LA)
- Arroyo Seco Museum Science Magnet
- Ascot Avenue Elementary School
- Atwater Avenue Elementary School
- Aurora Elementary School (opened 2006 )
- Avalon Gardens Elementary School (Willowbrook)

==== B ====
- Judith F. Baca Arts Academy (opened 2010)
- Danny J. Bakewell Sr. Primary Center (Kindergarten, opened 2005 )
- Balboa Gifted/High Ability Magnet Elementary (1–5)
- Baldwin Hills Elementary School
- Bandini Street Elementary School
- Charles W. Barrett Elementary School (formerly 98th Street School)
- Barton Hill Elementary School
- Bassett Street Elementary School
- Beachy Avenue Elementary School
- Beckford Charter for Enriched Studies
- Beethoven Street Elementary School
- Bellevue Primary Center (K–1)
- Bellingham Elementary School (opened 2004 )
- Belvedere Elementary School
- Bertrand Avenue Elementary School
- Frances Blend Elementary School (opened 1926, merged with Van Ness Avenue Elementary School in 2013)
- Blythe Street Elementary School
- Bonita Street Elementary School
- Braddock Drive Elementary School and Gifted Magnet
- Tom Bradley Global Awareness Magnet (The school also takes "zoned" students & also formerly known as Dublin Elementary)
- Brainard Avenue Elementary School
- Breed Street Elementary School (2nd Oldest Elementary School in LAUSD, opened 1881.)
- Brentwood Elementary Science Magnet (only kindergarten is zoned – 1–5 are magnet students)
- Bridge Street Elementary School
- Birdielee V. Bright Elementary School (formerly 36th Street School)
- Broad Avenue Elementary School, Wilmington, LA
- Broadacres Avenue Elementary School
- Hillery T. Broadous Elementary School (formerly Filmore Street School)
- Broadway Elementary School
- Brockton Avenue Elementary School
- Brooklyn Avenue Elementary School (East Los Angeles)
- Bryson Avenue Elementary School
- Buchanan Street Elementary School
- Budlong Avenue Elementary School
- Burbank Boulevard Elementary School
- Burton Street Elementary School
- Bushnell Way Elementary School

==== C ====
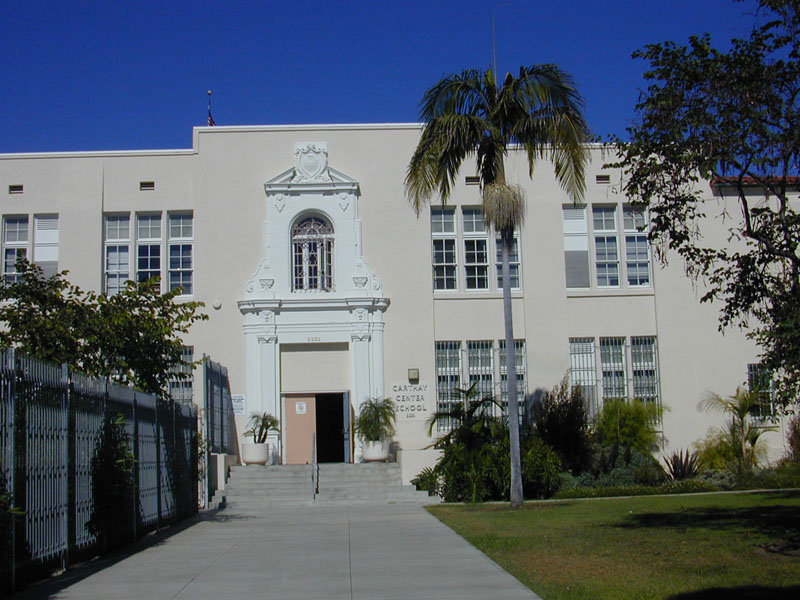
Carthay Center School

- Cabrillo Avenue Elementary School
- Cabrillo Avenue STEAM Magnet Elementary School
- Cahuenga Elementary School
- Calabash Charter Academy
- Calahan Community Charter School
- Calvert Charter for Enriched Studies
- Camellia Avenue Elementary School (Sun Valley, LA)
- Canfield Avenue Elementary School
- Canoga Park Elementary School
- Cantara Street Elementary School
- Canterbury Avenue Elementary School
- Canyon Charter Elementary School
- Capistrano Avenue Elementary School
- Andres & Maria Cardenas Elementary School (opened 2010)
- Carmen Lomas Garza Primary Center(k-2)
- Carpenter Community Charter School (formerly Carpenter Avenue Elementary School)
- Carson Street Elementary School
- Carson-Gore Academy of Environmental Studies (opened 2010)
- Carthay Center Elementary School (beginning in Fall 2014, Carthay ES becomes Carthay Elementary of Environmental Studies Magnet)
- Castle Heights Elementary School
- Castlebay Lane Elementary School
- Catskill Avenue Elementary School
- Century Park Elementary School
- Chandler Learning Academy
- Chapman Elementary School
- Charnock Road Elementary School
- Chase Street Elementary School
- Chatsworth Park Elementary School
- Cesar Chavez Elementary School (opened 2005)}
- Cheremoya Avenue Elementary School
- Chime Institute Schwarzenegger Community School (located at the former Collier Street School.)
- Cienega Elementary School
- Cimmaron Avenue Elementary School
- City Terrace Elementary School (East Los Angeles)
- Clifford Street Math & Technology Magnet
- Clover Avenue Elementary School
- Coeur d'Alene Avenue Elementary School
- Cohasset Street Elementary School
- Coldwater Canyon Elementary School
- Colfax Charter Elementary School
- Coliseum Street Elementary School (Baldwin Hills/Crenshaw, LA)
- Columbus Avenue Elementary School
- Commonwealth Avenue Elementary School
- Community Magnet Charter School
- Compton Avenue Elementary School
- Corona Avenue Elementary School
- Sara Coughlin Elementary School (opened 2005 )
- Cowan Avenue Elementary School
- Crescent Heights Boulevard Elementary Language Arts and Social Justice Magnet
- Crestwood Street Elementary School

==== D ====
Dorris Place Elementary

- Dahila Heights Elementary School (Eagle Rock, LA)
- Danube Avenue Elementary School
- Darby Avenue Charter School
- Dayton Heights Elementary School
- Dearborn Elementary Charter School
- Del Amo Elementary School
- Frank Del Olmo Elementary School (opened 2006 )
- Delevan Drive Elementary School (Eagle Rock, LA)
- Christopher Dena Elementary School (formerly Dacotah Street School)
- Denker Avenue Elementary School
- Dixie Canyon Community Charter School
- Dolores Street Elementary School
- Dominguez Elementary School
- Dorris Place Elementary School
- Dr. Sammy Lee Medical/Health Science Magnet Elementary School
- Dyer Street Elementary School

==== E ====
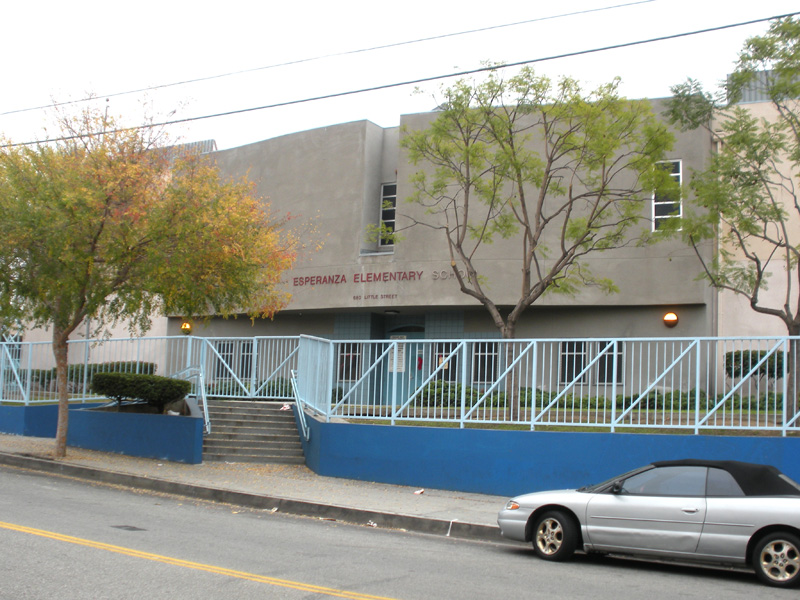
Esperanza Elementary School

- Eagle Rock Elementary School
- Eastman Avenue Elementary School (East Los Angeles)
- El Dorado Avenue Elementary School
- El Oro Way Charter for Enriched Studies
- El Sereno Elementary School
- Elysian Heights Arts Magnet (Formerly Elysian Heights Elementary School)
  - See "Room 8", a cat who lived at the school
- Emelita Academy Charter School
- Enadia Technology Enriched Charter School (Reopened in 2008 )
- Encino Charter Elementary School
- Erwin Elementary School
- Jaime Escalante Elementary School (opened 2010)
- Martha Escutia Primary Center (opened 2005, )
- Eshelman Avenue Elementary School
- Esperanza Elementary School
- Estrella Elementary School (opened 2010)
- Euclid Avenue Elementary School
- Evergreen Avenue Elementary School

==== F ====
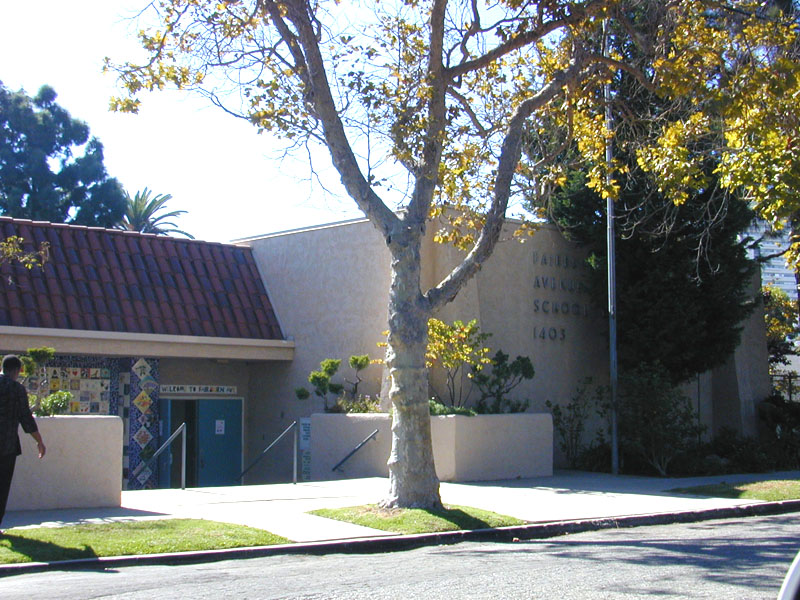
Fairburn Avenue School

- Fair Avenue Elementary School – Established just after World War II (1946) as an "Overflow" school from Victory Boulevard School in North Hollywood – bungalows were moved from Victory Boulevard School to Fair Avenue (near) Tunjunga Blvd in North Hollywood in an empty farm lot.
- Fairburn Avenue Elementary School
- Farmdale Elementary School
- Fenton Avenue Elementary School (Sun Valley, LA, charter school)
- Fenton Avenue Primary Center (Sun Valley, LA, opened 2013)
- Fernangeles Elementary School (Sun Valley, LA)
- Figueroa Street Elementary School
- Fishburn Avenue Elementary School (Maywood)
- Fletcher Drive Elementary School
- Florence Avenue Elementary School
- Lovelia P. Flournoy Elementary School (formerly 111th Street School, Watts, LA)
- Ford Boulevard Elementary School (East Los Angeles)
- Franklin Avenue Elementary School
- Fries Avenue Elementary School, Wilmington, LA
- Fullbright Avenue Elementary School

==== G ====
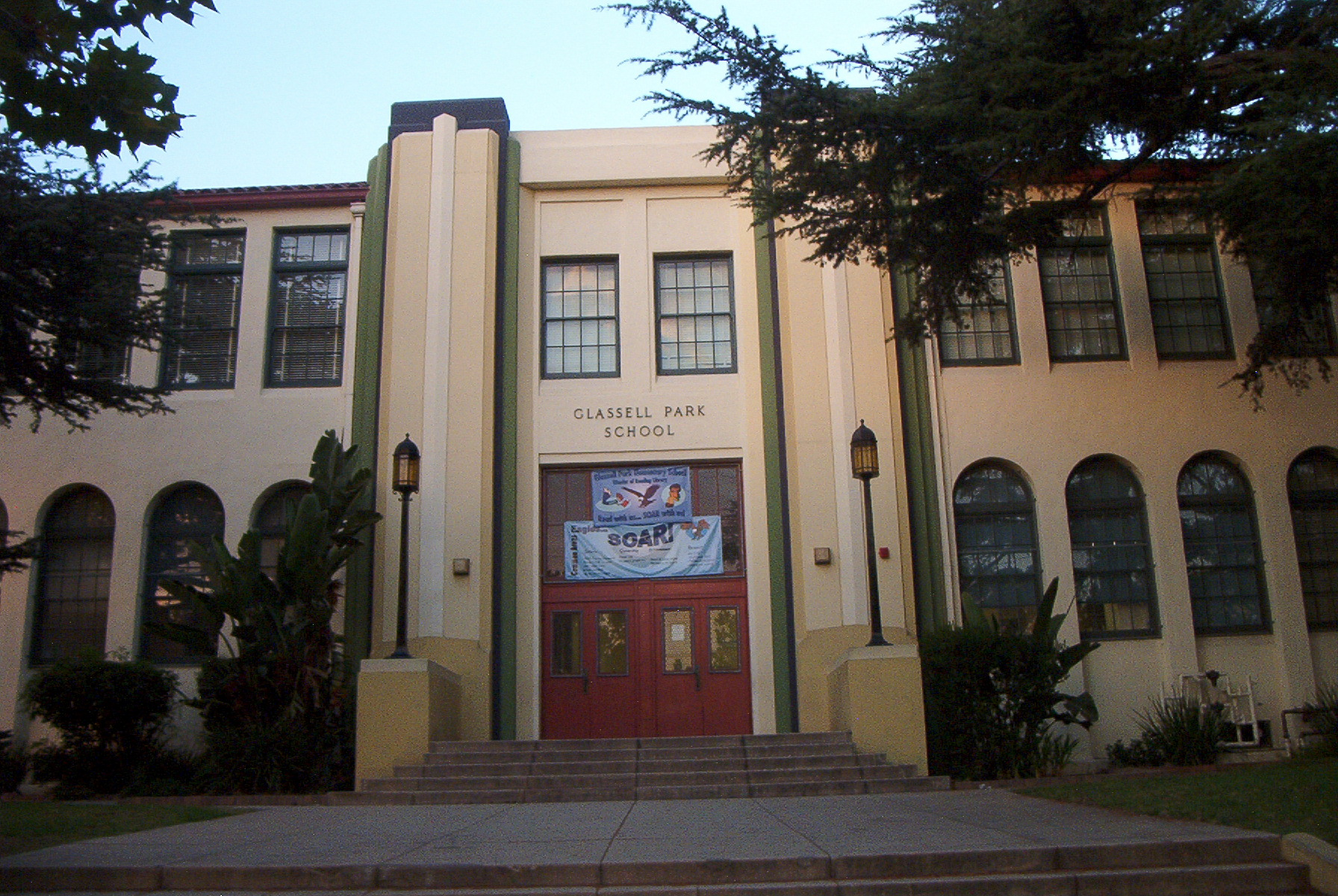
Glassell Park Elementary School

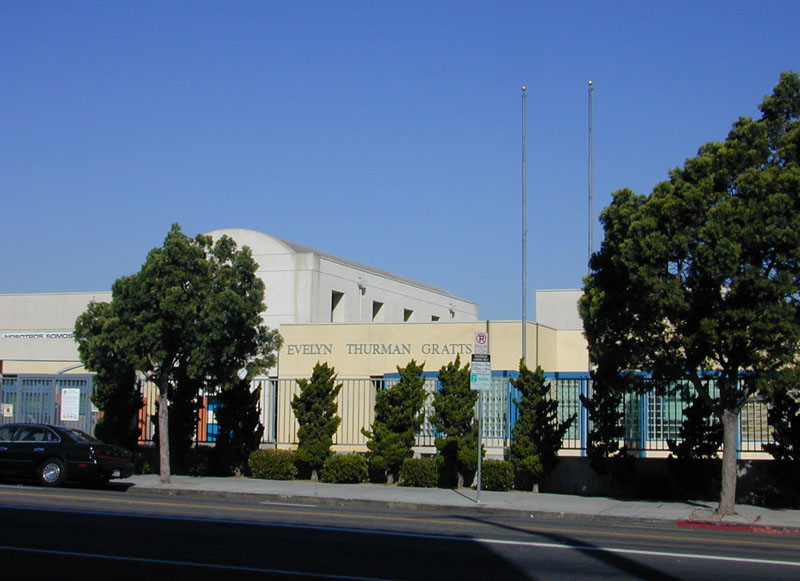
Evelyn Thurman Gratts Elementary School

- Garden Grove Elementary School
- Gardena Elementary School
- Gardner Street Elementary School
- Garvanza Elementary School
- Gates Street Elementary School
- Gault Street Elementary School
- Germain Academy for Academic Achievement
- Glassell Park Elementary School
- Gledhill Street Elementary School
- Glen Alta Elementary School
- Glenfeliz Boulevard Elementary School
- Glenwood Elementary School (Sun Valley, LA)
- Graham Elementary School, Florence-Firestone
- Granada Community Charter School
- Grand View Boulevard Elementary School
- Grant Elementary School
- Grape Street Elementary School, Watts, LA
- Gratts Learning Academy for Young Scholars
- Gridley Street Elementary School
- Griffin Avenue Elementary School (3rd oldest elementary school in LAUSD, opened 1882.)
- Florence Griffith-Joyner Elementary School
- Gulf Avenue Elementary School, Wilmington, LA

==== H ====
- Haddon Avenue Elementary School
- Halldale Elementary School
- Hamlin Charter Academy
- Hancock Park Elementary School
- Harbor City Elementary School
- Harding Street Elementary School
- Harmony Elementary School (opened 2004)
- Harrison Elementary School (East Los Angeles)
- Hart Street Elementary School
- Harvard Elementary School (opened 2005)
- Haskell Elementary STEAM Magnet
- Hawaiian Avenue Elementary School, Wilmington, LA
- Haynes Charter for Enriched Studies
- Hazeltine Avenue Elementary School
- Heliotrope Avenue Elementary School
- Herrick Avenue Elementary School
- Hillcrest Drive Elementary School (Baldwin Hills/Crenshaw, LA)
- Hillside Elementary School
- Hobart Boulevard Elementary School
- Hollywood Primary Center (K–2) (opened 2005)
- Holmes Avenue Elementary School
- Hooper Avenue Elementary School, Central-Alameda (1–5)
- Hooper Avenue Primary Center (Kindergarten only, completed 2005)
- Hoover Street Elementary School
- Hope Street Elementary School (opened 2005)
- Hubbard Street Elementary School (opened c. 1960, formerly Sylmar Chicken Ranch)
- Dolores Huerta Elementary School (opened 2010)
- Teresa Hughes Elementary School (Huntington Park)
- Humphreys Avenue Elementary School (East Los Angeles)
- Huntinghton Drive Elementary School
- Huntington Park Elementary School (opened 2006)

==== I ====
- Independence Elementary School
- Ivanhoe Elementary School

==== J ====
- Quincy Jones Elementary School (South-Central, LA)
- Dr. James Edward Jones Primary Center (Vermont Square, LA, opened in 2008 )
- Justice Street Academy Charter School (West Hills, LA)
- Jose Castellanos Elementary School (Pico-Union, LA)

==== K ====
- Kenter Canyon Charter Elementary School
- Kentwood Elementary School
- Kester Avenue Elementary School
- Charles H. Kim Elementary School (opened Fall 2006 )
- Martin Luther King Jr. Elementary School (formerly Santa Barbara Avenue School)
- Kingsley Elementary School (opened 2005 )
- Kittridge Street Elementary School
- Knollwood Preparatory Academy
- Dr. Owen Lloyd Knox Elementary School
- Julie Korenstein Elementary School (opened 2010)

==== L ====
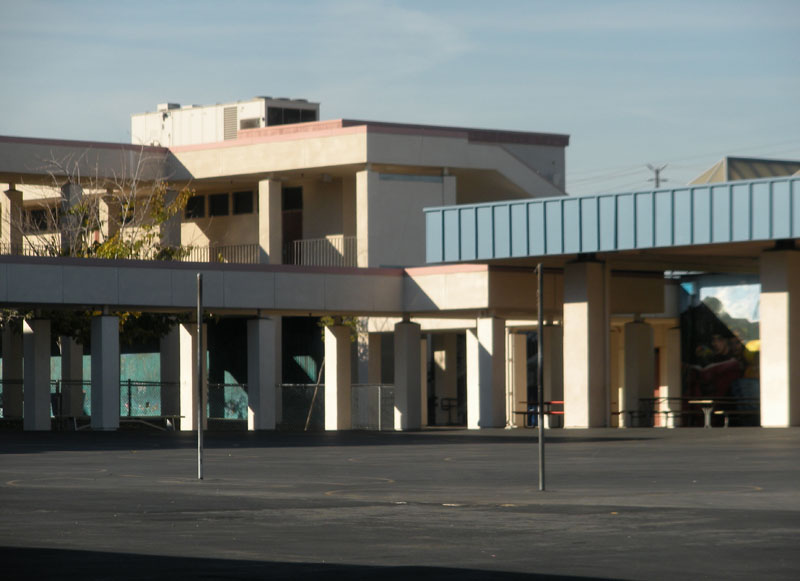
Lockwood Avenue School

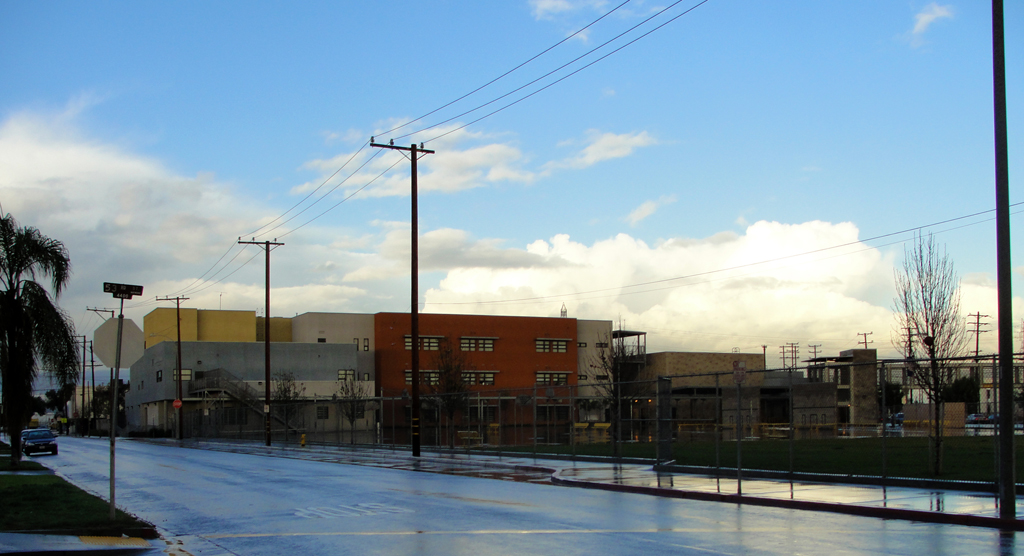
Maywood Elementary School

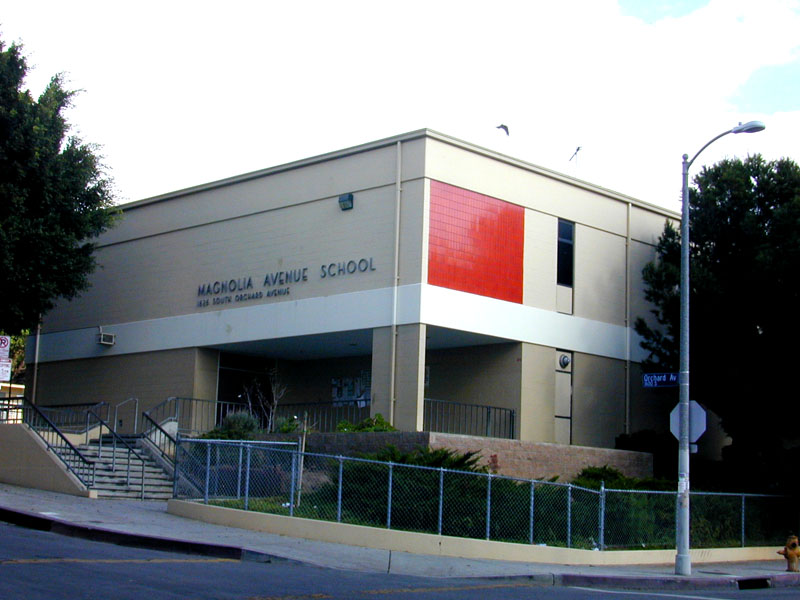
Magnolia Avenue Elementary School

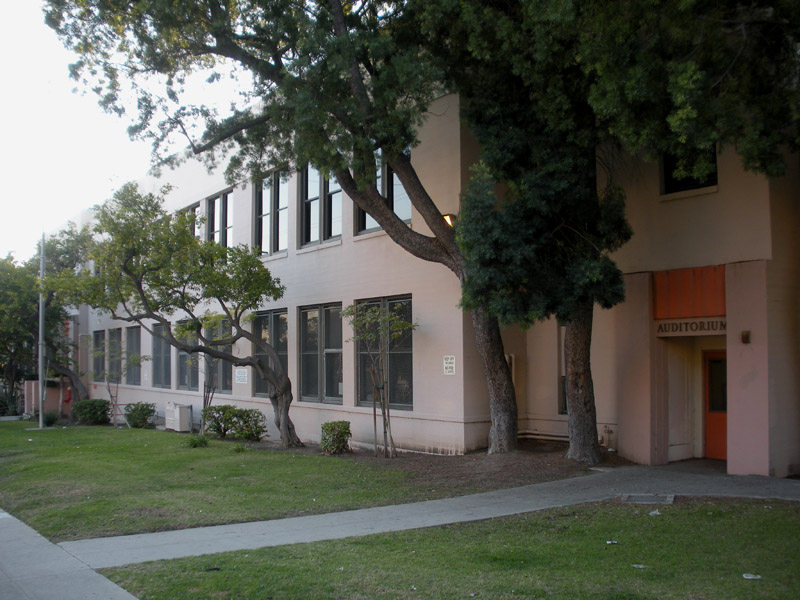
Micheltoreana Street School

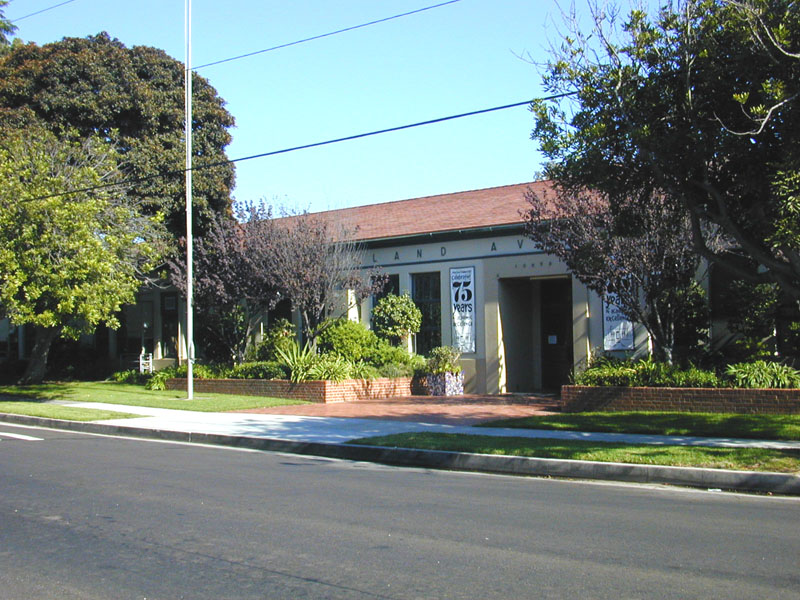
Overland Avenue Elementary School

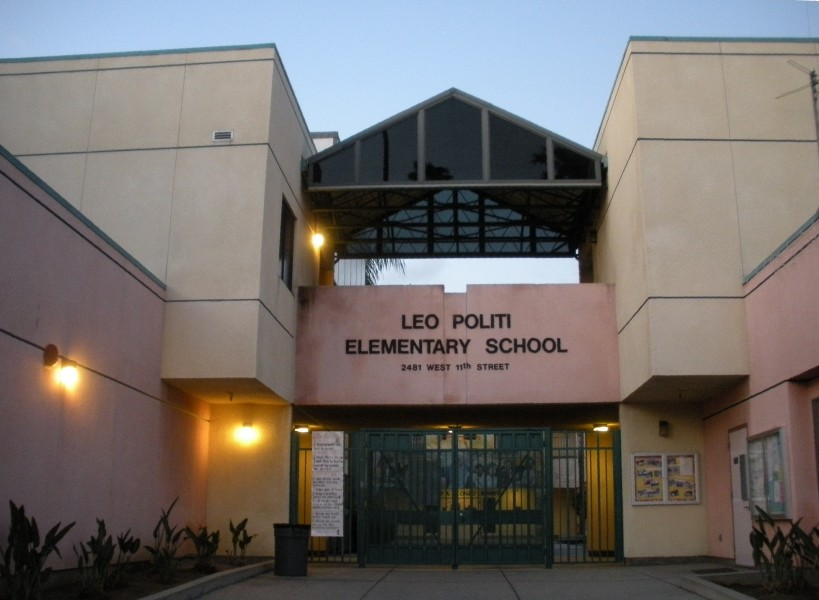
Leo Politi Elementary School

- La Salle Avenue Elementary School
- Lafayette Park Primary Center
- Lake Street Primary School
- Robert Hill Lane Elementary School
- Lanai Road Elementary School
- Langdon Avenue Elementary School
- Lankershim Elementary School
- Lassen Elementary School
- Latona Avenue Elementary School
- Laurel Elementary School
- Gerald A. Lawson Academy A/M/S Elementary School
- Leapwood Avenue Elementary School
- Dr. Sammy Lee Elementary M/HS Magnet (opened 2013)
- Leland Street Elementary School
- Lemay Street Elementary School
- Lexington Avenue Primary Center (K–2) (opened 2006 )
- Liberty Boulevard Elementary School
- Liggett Street Elementary School
- Lillian Elementary School
- Limerick Avenue Elementary School (opened 1957, Re-opened 1980)
- Ricardo Lizarraga Elementary School (opened 2005 )
- Lockhurst Drive Charter Elementary School
- Lockwood Elementary School
- Logan Street Elementary School
- Loren Miller Elementary School, Vermont Knolls
- Loma Vista Elementary School (Maywood, opened 1926)
- Lomita Elementary M/S/T Magnet
- Lorena Street Elementary School
- Loreto Elementary School
- Lorne Street Elementary School
- Los Angeles Elementary School
- Los Feliz Elementary School
- Loyola Village Elementary Fine/Performing Arts Magnet
- Lucille Roybal-Allard Elementary School (opened 2012)

==== M ====
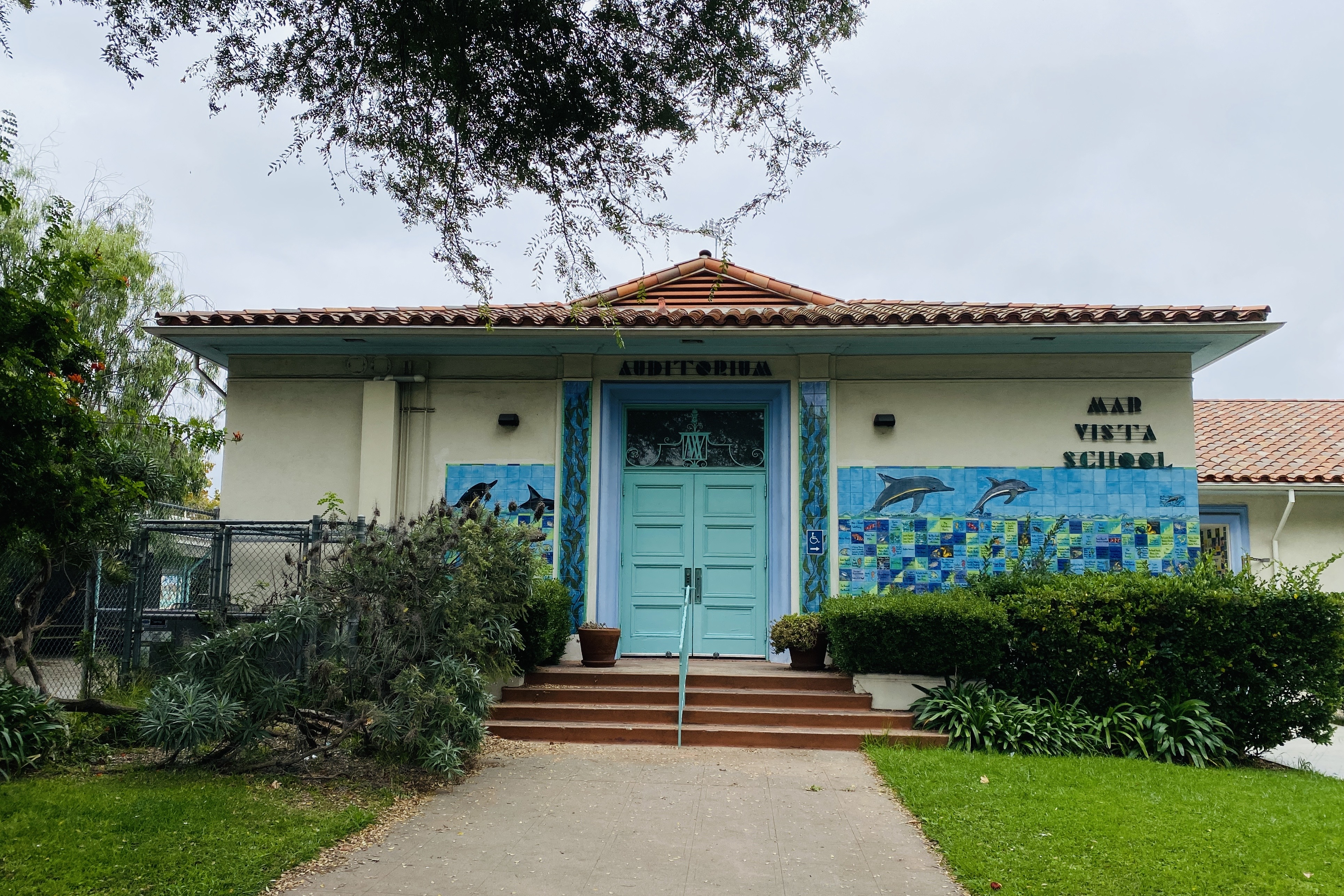
Mar Vista Elementary

- MacArthur Park Elementary Visual & Performing Arts
- John W. Mack Elementary School (opened 2005 )
- Madison Elementary School (opened 2005)
- Magnolia Avenue Elementary School
- Main Street Elementary School
- Maple Primary Center (K–1) (opened 2004 )
- Malabar Street Elementary School
- Manchester Avenue Elementary School, Vermont Vista, LA
- Manhattan Place Elementary School
- Mar Vista Elementary School
- Marianna Avenue Elementary School
- Mariposa-Nabi Primary Center (K–2) (opened 2005 )
- Marquez Charter School (K–5)
- Marvin Elementary School
- Mayall Street Academy of Arts/Technology Magnet
- Mayberry Street Elementary School (K–5)
- Maywood Elementary School (Maywood, opened 2005 )
- Mckinley Avenue Elementary School
- Melrose Avenue Elementary Math/Science/Technology Magnet
- Melvin Avenue Elementary School
- Meyler Street Elementary School
- Micheltorena Elementary School (K – 5)
- Middleton Elementary School] (1 – 6)
- Middleton Primary Center (Kindergarten) (opened 2005 )
- Miles Avenue Elementary School
- Loren Miller Elementary School
- Miramonte Elementary School
- John B. Monlux Elementary School
- Montague Charter Academy
- Montara Avenue Elementary School
- Monte Vista Elementary School
- Dr. Lawrence H. Moore Math/Science/Technology Academy (opened 2012)
- Morningside Elementary School
- Stanley Mosk Elementary School (opened 2010)
- Mount Washington Elementary School
- Mountain View Elementary School
- Multnomah Street Elementary School
- Murchinson Street Elementary School

==== N ====
- Napa Street Elementary School
- Nestle Avenue Charter School
- Nevada Avenue Elementary School
- Nevin Avenue Elementary School
- Newcastle Elementary School
- Noble Avenue Elementary School
- Normandie Avenue Elementary School
- Normont Elementary School
- Norwood Street Elementary School
- Nueva Vista Elementary School (Bell, opened 1991)

none

==== P ====
- Pacific Boulevard School (opened 2005 )
- Pacoima Charter Elementary School
- Palisades Charter Elementary School (chartered 1993, renewed 2005)
- Palms Elementary School
- Panorama City Elementary School
- Park Avenue Elementary School
- Park Western Place Elementary School
- Parmelee Avenue Elementary School
- Parthenia Street Elementary School
- Paseo del Rey Elementary Natural Science Magnet
- Pinewood Avenue Elementary School
- Plainview Academic Charter Academy
- Betty Plasencia Elementary School (formerly, Cortez Street School)
- Playa Del Rey Elementary School
- Playa Vista Elementary School (opened 2012)
- Plummer Elementary School
- Point Fermin Marine Science Magnet
- Leo Politi Elementary School
- Pomelo Community Charter School
- President Avenue Elementary School
- Primary Academy for Success School
- Purche Avenue Elementary School

==== Q ====
- Queen Anne Place Elementary School

==== R ====
- Ramona Elementary School
- Ranchito Avenue Elementary School
- Raymond Avenue Elementary School, Vermont Knolls, LA
- Reseda Elementary School
- Richland Avenue Elementary School
- Richard Riordan Primary Center
- Rio Vista Elementary School
- Ritter Elementary School
- Riverside Drive Charter School
- Rockdale Visual & Performing Arts Magnet (Eagle Rock, LA)
- Rosa Parks Learning Center (opened 2006 )
- Roscoe Elementary School (Sun Valley, LA)
- Roscomare Road Elementary School
- Rosemont Avenue Elementary School
- Rosewood Avenue Elementary School
- Rowan Avenue Elementary School
- Russell Elementary School, Florence-Firestone

==== S ====
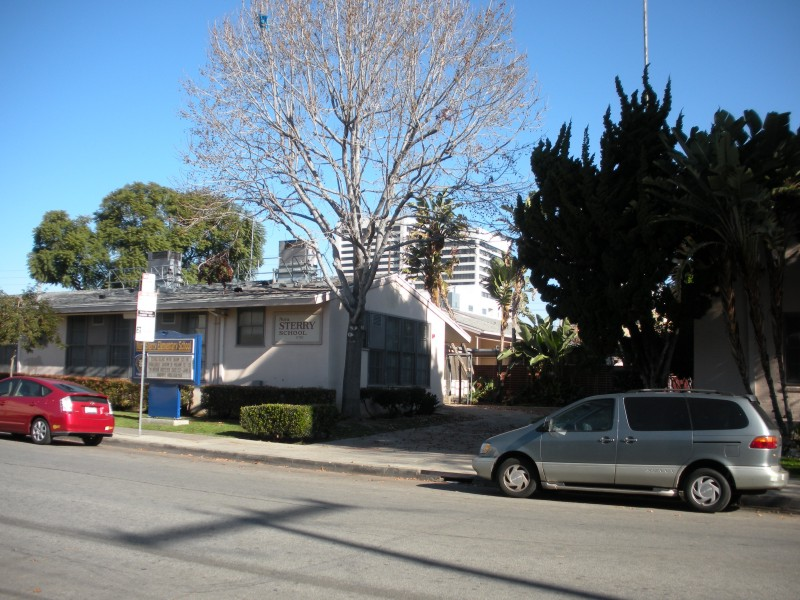
Nora Sterry Elementary School

- Sally Ride Elementary: A Smart Academy (opened 2012)
- San Antonio Elementary School
- San Fernando Elementary School
- San Gabriel Avenue Elementary School
- San Jose Street Elementary School
- San Miguel Elementary School
- San Pascual Avenue Elementary STEAM
- San Pedro Street Elementary School (oldest ELEMENTARY School in LAUSD, opened 1866)
- Santa Monica Boulevard Community Charter School
- Saticoy Elementary School (Sun Valley, LA)
- Saturn Street Elementary School
- Maurice Sendak Elementary School (opened 2005 )
- Serrania Avenue Charter for Enriched Studies
- Sharp Avenue Elementary School
- Shenandoah Street Elementary School
- Sheridan Street Elementary School
- Sherman Oaks Elementary Charter School
- Shirley Avenue Elementary School
- Short Avenue Elementary School
- Sierra Park Elementary School
- Sierra Vista Elementary School
- Solano Avenue Elementary School
- Soto Street Elementary School
- South Park Elementary School
- South Shores Elementary Performing Arts Magnet
- Stagg Street Elementary School
- Stanford Elementary School (1-5)
- Stanford Primary Center (Kindergarten, opened 2004 )
- State Street Elementary School
- Nora Sterry Elementary School
- Stonehurst Elementary School (Shadow Hills, LA)
- Stoner Avenue Elementary School (Los Angeles)
- Strathern Street Elementary School (Sun Valley, LA)
- Sunland Elementary School
- Sunny Brae Elementary School
- Sunrise Elementary School
- Superior Street Elementary School
- Sylmar Elementary School
- Sylvan Park Elementary School

==== T ====
- Taper Avenue Elementary School
- Tarzana Elementary School
- Telfair Avenue Elementary School
- Toland Way Elementary School (Eagle Rock, LA)
- Toluca Lake Elementary School
- Topanga Elementary Charter School (unincorporated Los Angeles County)
- Topeka Avenue Charter for Advanced Studies
- Towne Avenue Elementary School
- Trinity Street Elementary School
- Tulsa Street Elementary School
- Tweedy Elementary School (opened 2004 )

==== U ====
- Union Avenue Elementary School

==== V ====
- Valerio Street Elementary School
- Valley View Elementary School
- Van Deene Avenue Elementary School
- Van Gogh Charter School
- Van Ness Avenue Elementary School
- Van Nuys Elementary School
- Vanalden Avenue Elementary School
- Vena Avenue Elementary School
- Vermont Avenue Elementary School
- Vernon City Elementary School (Vernon City)
- Victoria Avenue Elementary School
- Victory Boulevard Elementary School and STEAM Magnet
- Vine Street Elementary
- Vintage Math/Science/Technology Magnet School (only kindergarten is zoned – Grades 1-5 are completely magnet)
- Virginia Road Elementary School
- Vista Del Valle Dual Language Academy (opened 2010)

==== W ====
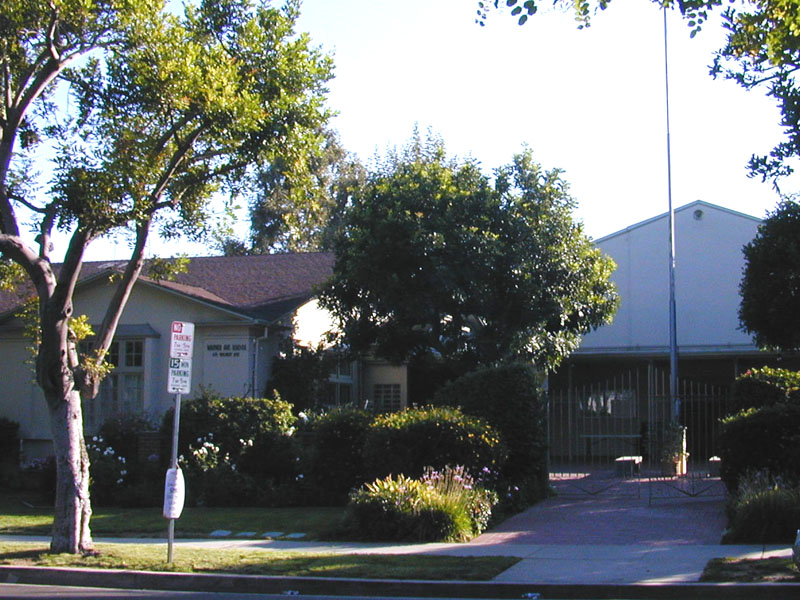
Warner Avenue Elementary School

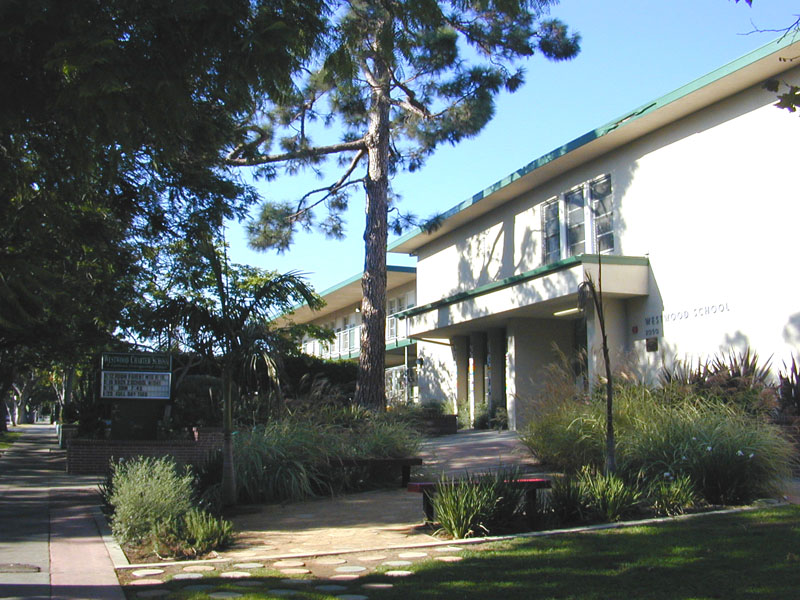
Westwood Charter Elementary School

- Wadsworth Avenue Elementary School
- Walgrove Avenue Elementary School
- Walnut Park Elementary School
- Warner Avenue Elementary School (Los Angeles)
- Washington Primary Center (K–1) (opened 2005 )
- Lenicia B. Weemes Elementary School (formerly 37th Street School)
- Weigand Avenue Elementary School
- Welby Way Charter Elementary and Gifted-High Ability Magnet
- West Athens Elementary School
- West Hollywood Elementary School
- West Vernon Avenue Elementary School
- Western Avenue TECH Magnet
- Westminster Avenue Elementary Math/Technology/Environmental Studies Magnet
- Westport Heights Elementary School
- Westwood Charter Elementary School (Los Angeles)
- Charles White Elementary School (opened 2004 )
- White Point Elementary School
- Wilbur Charter for Enriched Academics
- Willow Elementary School (opened 2012)
- Wilmington Park Elementary School, Wilmington, LA
- Wilshire Crest Elementary School
- Wilshire Park Elementary School (opened 2006 )
- Wilton Place Elementary School
- Windsor Hills Elementary Math/Science Aerospace Magnet
- Winnetka Avenue Elementary School
- Wisdom Elementary School (opened 2010)
- Wonderland Avenue Elementary School
- Woodcrest Elementary School
- Woodlake Elementary Community Charter School
- Woodland Hills Elementary Charter for Enriched Studies
- Woodlawn Avenue Elementary School

==== Y ====
- Yorkdale Elementary School
- Young Empowered Scholars Academy (also known as YES Academy) (formerly Hyde Park Elementary School)
- Young Oak Kim Academy

=== Charter Elementary Schools ===
- Para Los Ninos Gratts Primary Center
- Aspire Public Schools
  - Aspire Firestone Academy
  - Aspire Gateway Academy
  - Aspire Inskeep Academy
  - Aspire Junior Collegiate Academy
  - Aspire Antonio Maria Lugo Academy
  - Aspire Slauson Acadeny
  - Aspire Tate, Juanita Academy
  - Aspire Titan Academy
- Magnolia Public Schools
  - Magnolia Science Academy 7-Northridge (previously Van Nuys, Grades K–5)

=== Optional elementary schools ===
- 32nd USC Performing Arts
- Arroyo Seco Museum Science Magnet
- Balboa Gifted/High Ability Magnet Elementary School
- Carthay Environmental Studies Magnet (began in Fall 2014)
- N.E.W. Canoga Park Elementary School (opened 2006)
- San Jose Highly Gifted Magnet Elementary

== Early education centers ==
- Central Region EEC 1 (opened in 2010 )
- Central Region Gratts EEC (opened in 2009 )
- Valley Region EEC 1 (opened in 2010 )

=== To be opened ===
- Central Region EEC 2 (to be opened – renovation of classrooms at Humphreys ES )
- Central Region EEC 3 (to be opened – renovation of classrooms at Utah ES )
- Central Region Glassell Park EEC (to be opened )

== Former schools ==
- 98th Street School – located at 5431 W 98th Street, Westchester, California. School Reopened in the 2000s as Bright Star Secondary Charter Academy.
- Airport Junior High School (closed and razed in 1975) – located at 9000 Airport Boulevard, Westchester, California.
- Anchorage Street School – located at 104 E Anchorage Street, Marina Del Rey, Los Angeles, California. Merged to Westside Global Awareness Magnet.
- Avenue 21 School – A predecessor to Abraham Lincoln High School, opened in 1878 and became an intermediate school in 1913, it was located between Pasadena Avenue and Avenue 21, Los Angeles, California. Demolished to make way for the Golden State Freeway and a warehouse.
- Central Junior High School – located on the former site of Fort Moore on Hill Street in Downtown, Los Angeles the school closed in 1946 to make way for a complex, and then demolished in 2005 to make way for Ramon C. Cortines School of Visual & Performing Arts.
- Henry Clay Middle School – located at 12226 S Western Avenue. This school is now home to Animo Western Charter Middle School
- Collins Street Elementary School (closed by the end of 2001–2002 school year) – located at 5717 Rudnick Avenue, Woodland Hills, California. This school was demolished in 2018.
- Collier Street School (1963-1988) – located at 19722 Collier Street, Woodland Hills, California. This school reopened in 1990 as CHIME Institute's Schwarzenegger Community School.
- Custer Avenue School – located at Central Los Angeles. It was covered with freeway and now home to Downtown Magnets High School.
- Devonshire School – located at 10045 Jumilla Avenue, Chatsworth, California. This school became home to our community school.
- Francisco Street School – located near Francisco Street near Central Los Angeles. It is now home to the Park DTLA.
- Hammel Street Elementary School (closed 2010) – located at 438 N Brannick Avenue. This school has moved to a new campus as William R. Anton Elementary School at 831 N Bonnie Beach Place near City Terrace While Hammel Street Elementary is demolished and was taken over by the new Esteban E. Torres High School in 2010.
- Highlander Road Elementary School (1962-2004) – located at 23834 Highlander Road, Woodland Hills, California. This school has also been demolished in 2016, same year as Oso Avenue School, to make way for Hale VAPA Magnet.
- Charles E. Hughes Middle School – located at 5607 Capistrano Avenue, Woodland Hills, California. This school is now home to Hughes Adult Learning Center.
- Indiana Street Elementary School – Now Home to Ramona Community High School.
- Lafayette Junior High School – located at 1240 Naomi Avenue. School closed in 1955 due to decreasing enrollment figures. Now used as a school district office.
- McDonnell Avenue School – located at 4540 Michigan Ave, Los Angeles, California. Merged in 1970s as Alphonso B. Perez Career and Transition Center.
- Oakdale Avenue School (1962-1976) Located at 6844 Oakdale Avenue, Winnetka, Los Angeles, California. The school was sold to reopen as AGBU Manoogian-Demirdjian School.
- Osage elementary school - osage ave, westchester 90045
- Oso Avenue Elementary School (closed 2003) – located at 5724 Oso Avenue, Woodland Hills, California. This school was demolished in 2016.
- Palo Verde School – located in the Echo Park neighborhood. In the 1960s, the school and the remaining houses as well were all torn down to make way for the Dodger Stadium.
- Louis Pasteur Junior High School – located at 5931 W. 18th Street, Los Angeles, California. This school reopened in 1977 as Los Angeles Center for Enriched Studies.
- Platt Ranch Elementary School (1963-2003) – located at 5345 Wilhelmina Avenue, Woodland Hills, California. This former school has currently operated Class Acts Musical Theatre, but it was planning to reopen soon.
- Prairie Street Elementary School – located on Prairie Street, Near California State University Northridge at Northridge, California. This school closed in 1993 and razed in 2004 to make way for parking lot and structure for CSUN.
- Rinaldi Street School - located on 17450 Rinaldi Street, Granada Hills, California. This school is home to Rinaldi Adult Center.
- Sequoia Junior High School – located at 18605 Erwin Street, Tarzana, California. This school reopened as Sherman Oaks Center for Enriched Studies.
- Cesar T Elementary
- Selma Avenue Elementary School – located at 6611 Selma Ave, Los Angeles, California. The school closed at the end of the 2020–2021 school year due to declining enrollment.
- Washington Boulevard School - located at 1925 S Budlong Ave, Los Angeles, California. This school is home to Sophia T. Salvin Special Education Center
- Marlton School (Los Angeles, closed ends of 2021-2022 school year) – for deaf and hearing-impaired students due to declining enrollment.
