= Bobs Watson =

American actor (1930–1999)

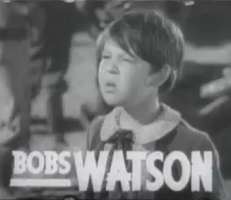
- Watson in Wyoming (1940)
- Born: Robert Ball Watson; November 16, 1930; Los Angeles, California, U.S.
- Died: June 26, 1999 (aged 68); Laguna Beach, California, U.S.
- Occupations: Actor, minister
- Years active: 1932–1993
- Spouse: Jaye Watson (m. 1979)
- Children: 3
- Relatives: Coy Watson Jr. (brother); Harry Watson (brother); Delmar Watson (brother)

Robert Ball Watson (November 16, 1930 – June 26, 1999), credited as Bobs Watson, was an American actor and Methodist minister.

== Early years ==
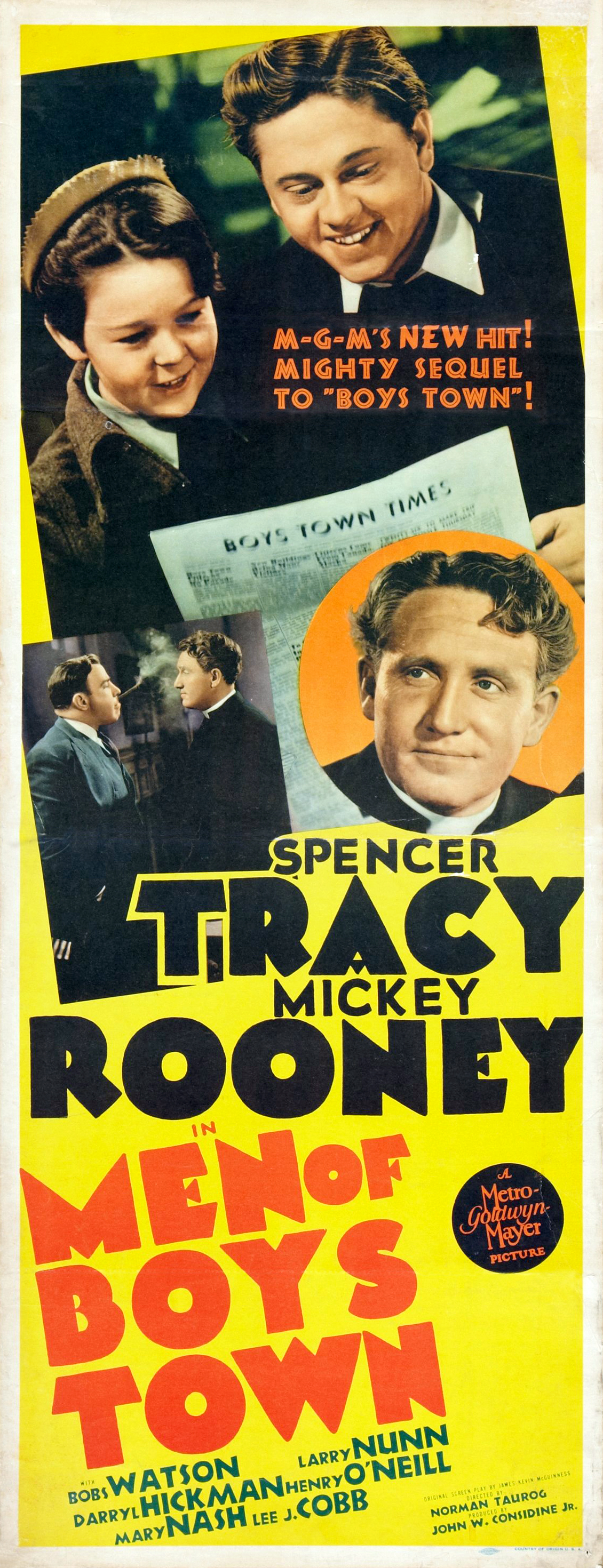
Bobs Watson (upper left) featured on a theatrical release poster for Men of Boys Town (1941)

Robert Ball Watson was a member of the Watson Family, famous in the early days of Hollywood as being a houseful of child actors. He was brother to Coy Watson Jr., Harry, Billy, Delmar, Garry, Vivian, Gloria, and Louise, all of whom acted in motion pictures.

The family, known as "the first family of Hollywood", lived by the Echo Park area of Los Angeles and Bobs attended nearby Belmont High School.

== Child actor ==
Watson was best known for his role as "Pee Wee" in the 1938 Metro-Goldwyn-Mayer film Boys Town and its sequel Men of Boys Town (1941), both starring Spencer Tracy and Mickey Rooney. Tracy and Watson became good friends during the making of the first film, and Watson was reportedly Tracy's last visitor before his death in 1967. In 1939, Watson delivered a fine, tear-jerking performance as Pud, Lionel Barrymore's grandson, in the MGM film, On Borrowed Time. Watson later made guest appearances in many television programs, including The Twilight Zone, Lou Grant, The Beverly Hillbillies, Green Acres, The Fugitive and Bonanza. In 1963 Watson appeared as Matt Lewis on The Virginian in the episode titled "A Distant Fury".

== Later career ==
In addition to working in the motion pictures business, Watson went to Claremont School of Theology to become a Methodist minister, inspired from the movie Boys Town. He retired after 30 years of serving in Burbank and La Cañada, California.

== Later life and death ==
The Watson family were honored by the Hollywood Chamber of Commerce by placing the Watson family star on the Hollywood Walk of Fame, at 6674 Hollywood Blvd., Hollywood, California.

Watson died of prostate cancer at Laguna Beach, California, on June 26, 1999, at the age of 68.

== Filmography ==
Year	Title	Role	Notes
1932	Life Begins	Edgar, Harry's Son	Film debut, Uncredited
1935	Life Begins at 40	Meriwether Son	Uncredited
1935	Two-Fisted	Eddie – Jimmy's Boxing Partner	Uncredited
1936	Show Boat	Willie Thomas	Uncredited
1936	Mary of Scotland	Fisherman's Son	Uncredited
1936	Libeled Lady	Waif	Uncredited
1937	The Great O'Malley	Boy	Uncredited
1937	Maytime	Maypole Singer	Uncredited
1937	It Happened in Hollywood	Boy	Uncredited
1938	In Old Chicago	Bob O'Leary as a Boy	
1938	Go Chase Yourself	Junior	Uncredited
1938	Boys Town	Pee Wee	
1938	Young Dr. Kildare	Bob O'Leary as a Boy	
1938	Kentucky	Peter Goodwin – 1861	
1939	Dodge City	Harry Cole	
1939	The Story of Alexander Graham Bell	George Sanders	
1939	Calling Dr. Kildare	Tommy Benson	Uncredited
1939	On Borrowed Time	Pud	
1939	Blackmail	Hank	
1940	Wyoming	Jimmy Kincaid	
1940	Dreaming Out Loud	Jimmy	
1940	Dr. Kildare's Crisis	Tommy, The Crippled Child	
1941	Men of Boys Town	Pee Wee	
1941	Scattergood Pulls the Strings	Jimmy Jordan	
1941	Hit the Road	Pesky	
1943	Hi, Buddy	Tim Martin	
1955	The Public Defender	Rodger Bissel	Episode: Your Witness
1956	Crossroads		Episode: The White Carnation
1956	The Bold and the Brave	Bob	
1956	The 20th Century-Fox Hour	Farnum	Episode: Smoke Jumpers
1958	Flight		3 episodes
1959	Steve Canyon	A / 1c Gotch	Episode: The Search
1959	Hennesey	Waiter	Episode: Pork Chops and Apple Sauce
1959–1961	The Lawless Years	Butcher Boy/Mousie/Popcorn Peddler	3 episodes
1960–1961	The Jim Backus Show	Sidney	37 episodes
1961	Pete and Gladys	Phone Man	Episode: Crossed Wires
1962	Saintly Sinners	Attendant	Uncredited
1962	What Ever Happened to Baby Jane?	Clerk in Newspaper Classified Ad Department	
1962	Bonanza	Junior	
1963	The Lucky Show	Calvin	Episode: Lucy Becomes a Reporter
1963	The Twilight Zone	Man at Dining Room Table	Episode: No Time Like the Past
1963	The New Phil Silvers Show	Ollie	Episode: Birthday Boy
1963	The Virginian	Hotel Clerk/Matt Lewis/Clerk	3 episodes
1963	Take Her, She's Mine	Western Union Messenger	Uncredited
1963	The Fugitive	Milt Plummer	Episode: Nightmare at Northoak
1963	Grindl	Harry Dawson	Episode: Twas the Week Before Christmas
1964–1967	The Beverly Hillbillies	Fred Penrod/Harry Hogan	4 episodes
1965	The Joey Bishop Show	Bernie Stern	Episode: Never Put It in Writing
1966	The F.B.I.	Walsh	2 episodes
1967	Green Acres	Bell Hop	Episode: His Honor
1967	First to Fight	Sgt. Maypole	
1967	The Mothers-In-Law	Police Officer Bailey	Episode: The Not-Cold-Enough War
1967	Please Don't Eat the Daisies	Howard	Episode: The Day the Play Got Away
1970	Mrs. Stone's Thing	Bartender	
1977	Grand Theft Auto	Minister	Final film
1978–1981	Lou Grant	Lind/News Editor/Foreign Editor/Pete Trumbull	4 episodes
1993	The Case of the Wicked Wives	Judge Ezra Frank	Last appearance

== Bibliography ==
- Goldrup, Tom and Jim (2002). Growing Up on the Set: Interviews with 39 Former Child Actors of Film and Television. McFarland & Co. pp. 303–313. ISBN 1-4766-1370-2.
- Holmstrom, John (1996). The Moving Picture Boy: An International Encyclopaedia from 1895 to 1995. Norwich: Michael Russell, pp. 171–172.
- Best, Marc (1971). Those Endearing Young Charms: Child Performers of the Screen. South Brunswick and New York: Barnes & Co., pp. 256–259.
