= Harry Watson (actor) =

American actor (1921–2001)

- Born: Harry Ruilton Watson; August 31, 1921; Los Angeles, California, U.S.
- Died: June 8, 2001 (aged 79); Tujunga, California, U.S.
- Occupations: Actor, photographer
- Years active: 1928–1940
- Spouse: Peggy Watson

Harry Ruilton Watson (August 31, 1921 – June 8, 2001) was an American child actor, a U.S. Coast Guard combat photographer in World War II, and a pioneer in television journalism.

== Early life ==
Watson was a member of the Watson Family, famous in the early days of Hollywood as being a family of child actors. Brother to Coy Watson Jr., Delmar, Bobs, Garry, Billy, Vivian, Gloria and Louise. The family lived by Echo Park area of Los Angeles and Harry attended Belmont High School. His high school yearbook the Campanile talked about his photography: "His magnificent sport action shots are the embodiment of perfection. His coach? Big brother Coy, of course."

== Career ==
Watson performed supporting roles in many early Hollywood movies including, Mr. Smith Goes to Washington, Penrod and Sam, A Damsel in Distress as little "Albert", as well as many others.

During WWII, his career in Hollywood was interrupted, and he served on a tour of the Pacific Theater as a combat photographer.

After the war, he became a pioneer in television journalism, contributing to bringing same-day coverage to the KTTV evening news.

The Watson family were honored by the Hollywood Chamber of Commerce by placing the Watson family star on the Hollywood Walk of Fame, at 6674 Hollywood Blvd., Hollywood, California.

== Partial filmography ==
- Taxi 13 (1928) - Mactavish Child (uncredited)
- Blue Skies (1929)
- Love, Live and Laugh (1929) - Little Boy (uncredited)
- Indiscreet (1931) - Baseball Captain (uncredited)
- Too Many Cooks (1931) - Cousin Harry Cook (uncredited)
- The Star Witness (1931) - Boy Baseball Player (uncredited)
- The Sport Parade (1932) - Kendricks' Boy (uncredited)
- Man's Castle (1933) - Baseball Team Captain (uncredited)
- Call It Luck (1934) - Child (uncredited)
- Life Begins at 40 (1935) - Meriwether Son (uncredited)
- Silk Hat Kid (1935) - Child (uncredited)
- Magnificent Obsession (1935) - Boy (uncredited)
- Paddy O'Day (1936) - Street Boy (uncredited)
- Under Proof (1936) - (uncredited)
- Let's Sing Again (1936) - Orphan washing dishes (uncredited)
- Show Boat (1936) - Boy (uncredited)
- Bullets or Ballots (1936) - Kid Playing Pinball (uncredited)
- Old Hutch (1936) - Freddie Hutchins
- King of Hockey (1936) - Boy Locating Dugan (uncredited)
- Time Out for Romance (1937) - Messenger (uncredited)
- Love Is News (1937) - Newsboy (uncredited)
- Penrod and Sam (1937) - Sam
- The Road Back (1937) - Boy (uncredited)
- Hot Water (1937) - Newsboy (uncredited)
- A Damsel in Distress (1937) - Albert
- Kidnapped (1938) - Sandy - an Urchin (uncredited)
- The Adventures of Huckleberry Finn (1939) - Ben Donaldson (uncredited)
- Mr. Smith Goes to Washington (1939) - Hopper Boy #3
- I Take This Woman (1940) - Oldest Murphy Kid (scenes deleted) (final film role)

== Bibliography ==
- John Holmstrom, The Moving Picture Boy: An International Encyclopaedia from 1895 to 1995, Norwich, Michael Russell, 1996, p. 105-106.
