= The Spy (1931 film) =

1931 film by Berthold Viertel

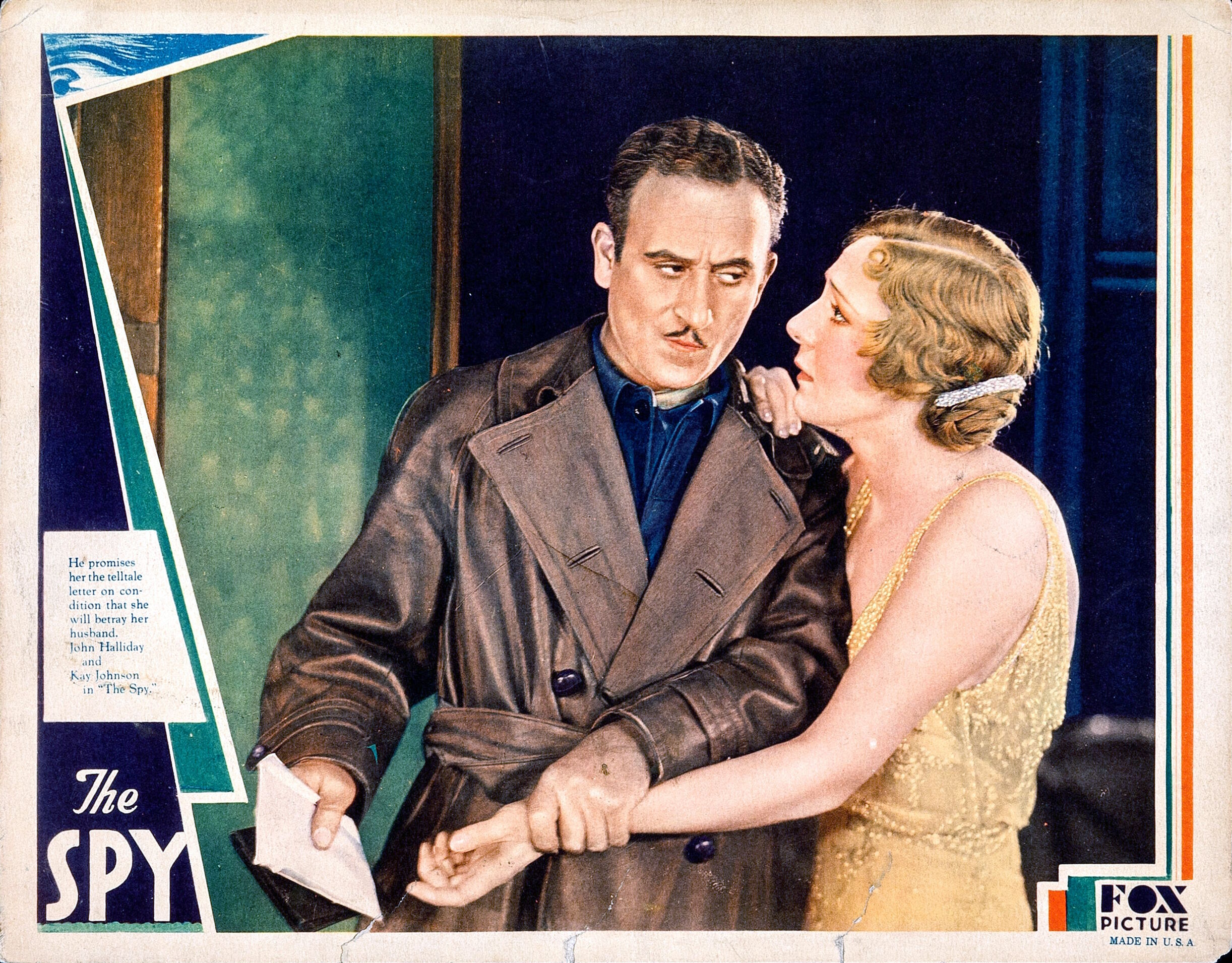
- Lobby card
- Directed by: Berthold Viertel
- Screenplay by: Ernest Pascal
- Starring: Kay Johnson; Neil Hamilton; John Halliday; Milton Holmes; Freddie Burke Frederick; Austen Jewell
- Cinematography: Lucien Andriot
- Edited by: J. Edwin Robbins
- Production company: Fox Film Corporation
- Distributed by: Fox Film Corporation
- Release date: April 26, 1931
- Running time: 68 minutes
- Country: United States
- Language: English

The Spy is a 1931 American pre-Code drama film directed by Berthold Viertel and written by Ernest Pascal. The film stars Kay Johnson, Neil Hamilton, John Halliday, Milton Holmes, Freddie Burke Frederick and Austen Jewell. The film was released on April 26, 1931, by Fox Film Corporation.

== Cast ==
- Kay Johnson as Anna Turin
- Neil Hamilton as Ivan Turin
- John Halliday as Sergei Krasnoff
- Milton Holmes as Yashka
- Freddie Burke Frederick as Kalya
- Austen Jewell as Petya
- Henry Kolker as Tchijinski
- Douglas Haig as Seryoska
- David Durand as Vanya
- Mischa Auer as Man in Cafe
