= Coy Watson Jr. =

American actor (1912–2009)

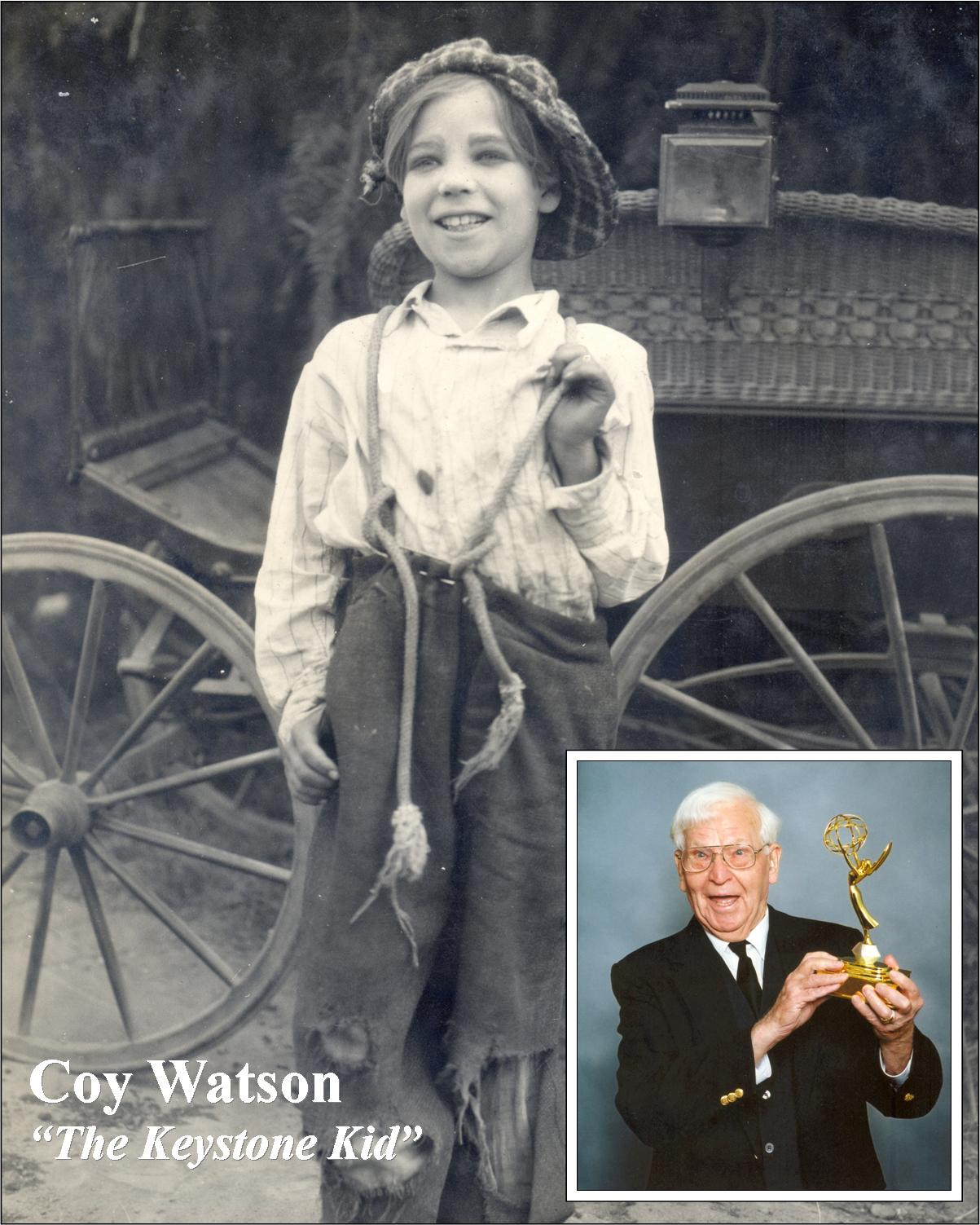
- Born: James Caughey Watson Jr. November 16, 1912; Los Angeles, California, U.S.
- Died: March 14, 2009 (aged 96); Alpine, California, U.S.
- Occupations: Child actor, news photographer, television cameraman
- Parent(s): James Caughey Watson Sr, Golda Watson
- Family: (siblings): Billy Watson; Delmar Watson; Garry Watson; Harry R. Watson; Vivian Watson; Gloria Watson; Louise Watson; Bobs Watson

James Caughey Watson Jr. (November 16, 1912 – March 14, 2009), professionally known as Coy Watson, was an American child actor of the silent era, who was from an extended family of nine siblings of fellow performers known as The Watson Family. He appeared in more than 60 films.

== Life and career ==
Coy Watson Jr. was the son of actor, stuntman, and pioneer special effects artist James Caughey "Coy" Watson Sr and his wife Golda. They lived by the Echo Park area of the city and Coy attended nearby Belmont High School. The younger Watson made his film debut in 1921 and appeared in approximately 24 films over a period of eight years. He had five brothers and three sisters who also acted in films, including Billy, Delmar, Garry, Harry, Vivian, Gloria, Louise Watson Roberts, and Bobs Watson. Because he was featured in several of Mack Sennett's popular "The Keystone Cops" comedies, he earned the nickname "The Keystone Kid".

During World War II, Watson served in the United States Coast Guard, based out of San Diego. Coy Watson Jr. was a Los Angeles-based news photographer for CBS Television in the 1950s. He was the head news photographer at KCRA-TV in Sacramento, California, from 1959 to 1961 before moving to Medford, Oregon. He was credited with teaching brother Harry R. Watson photography.

Watson's autobiography, The Keystone Kid: Tales of Early Hollywood, was published in 2001.

The Watson family were collectively honoured by the Hollywood Chamber of Commerce by placing The Watson Family Star on the Hollywood Walk of Fame located at 6674 Hollywood Boulevard, Hollywood, California.

Watson died of stomach cancer in Alpine, California, on March 14, 2009, at the age of 96.

== Partial filmography ==
- The Show (1922)
- The Right of the Strongest (1924)
- Dorothy Vernon of Haddon Hall (1924)
- The Golden Strain (1925)
- Rich But Honest (1927)
- Buttons (1927)
- Love Makes 'Em Wild (1927)
- The Shamrock and the Rose (1927)
- The Smart Set (1928)
- Show People (1928)
- Taxi 13 (1928)
- Blue Skies (1929)

== See also ==
- Watson family

== Bibliography ==
- John Holmstrom, The Moving Picture Boy: An International Encyclopaedia from 1895 to 1995, Norwich, Michael Russell, 1996, p. 56.
