= Change of Heart (1938 film) =

1938 film by James Tinling

- Directed by: James Tinling
- Screenplay by: Frances Hyland; Albert Ray
- Produced by: Sol M. Wurtzel
- Starring: Gloria Stuart; Michael Whalen; Lyle Talbot; Delmar Watson; Jane Darwell
- Cinematography: Daniel B. Clark
- Edited by: Irene Morra
- Music by: Samuel Kaylin
- Production company: 20th Century Fox
- Distributed by: 20th Century Fox
- Release date: January 14, 1938
- Running time: 59 minutes
- Country: United States
- Language: English

Change of Heart is a 1938 American comedy film directed by James Tinling and written by Frances Hyland and Albert Ray. The film stars Gloria Stuart, Michael Whalen, Lyle Talbot, Delmar Watson and Jane Darwell. The film was released on January 14, 1938, by 20th Century Fox.

== Cast ==
- Gloria Stuart as Carol Murdock
- Michael Whalen as Anthony Murdock
- Lyle Talbot as Phillip Reeves
- Delmar Watson as Jimmy Milligan
- Jane Darwell as Mrs. Thompson
