= Freddie Burke Frederick =

American actor (1921–1986)

Freddie Burke Frederick (January 13, 1921 in San Francisco – January 31, 1986 in Glendale, California) was an American child actor. He played Jackie Howell in the 1930 Paramount Pictures film Ladies Love Brutes.

== Filmography ==
- Fangs of Justice as Sonny Morgan (1926)
- Smith's New Home (short) (1927)
- The Crowd as Junior (1928)
- Marry the Girl as Sonny (1928)
- New Year's Eve as Little Brother (1929)
- Blue Skies as Richard Lewis (age 8) (1929)
- Evidence as Kenyon Wimborne (1929)
- Wall Street as Richard Tabor (1929)
- Second Wife as Walter Fairchild Junior (1930)
- Ladies Love Brutes as Jackie Howell (1930)
- Love Is Like That as Junior Carter (1930)
- Viennese Nights as Otto Stirner Jr. (uncredited) (1930)
- Mothers Cry as Arthur as a Child (uncredited) (1930)
- The Spy as Kalya (1931)
- The Iron Master as Little Billy (1933)
