= Blue Skies (1929 film) =

1929 film

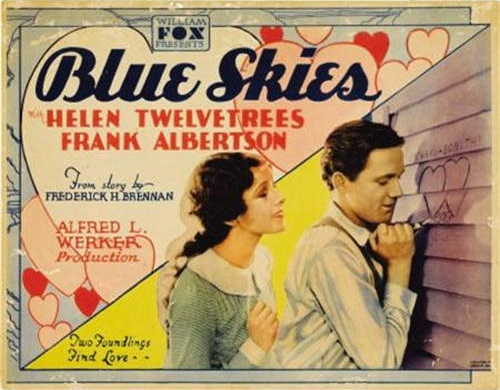
- Film poster
- Directed by: Alfred L. Werker
- Written by: Malcolm Stuart Boylan; Frederick Hazlitt Brennan; John Stone
- Starring: Carmencita Johnson; Freddie Burke Frederick; Ethel Wales
- Cinematography: L. William O'Connell
- Production company: Fox Film Corporation
- Distributed by: Fox Film Corporation
- Release date: March 17, 1929
- Running time: 60 minutes
- Country: United States
- Language: Sound (Synchronized) (English Intertitles)

Blue Skies is a 1929 American Synchronized sound drama film directed by Alfred L. Werker and starring Carmencita Johnson, Freddie Burke Frederick, and Ethel Wales. While the film has no audible dialog, it was released with a synchronized musical score with sound effects using the sound-on-film Movietone process. The film is based on a short story called The Matron's Report by Frederick Hazlitt Brennan. The short story also formed the basis for 1936's Little Miss Nobody.

== Cast ==
- Carmencita Johnson as Dorothy May
- Freddie Burke Frederick as Richard Lewis
- Ethel Wales as Matron
- Helen Twelvetrees as Dorothy May
- Frank Albertson as Richard Lewis
- Rosa Gore as Nellie Crouch
- William Orlamond as Janitor
- E.H. Calvert as Mr. Semple Jones
- Evelyn Hall as Mrs. Semple Jones
- Claude King as Richard Danforth
- Adele Watson as First Assistant Matron
- Helen Jerome Eddy as Second Assistant Matron
- Mickey Martin
- Dickie Moore
- Coy Watson
- Delmar Watson
- Harry Watson
- Virginia Bruce as Party Guest
- John Darrow as Dorothy's Beau / Party Guest

== See also ==
- List of early sound feature films (1926–1929)

== Bibliography ==
- Goble, Alan. The Complete Index to Literary Sources in Film. Walter de Gruyter, 1999.
