= Hunted Men =

1938 film

- Theatrical release poster
- Directed by: Louis King
- Screenplay by: William R. Lipman; Horace McCoy
- Produced by: Harold Hurley
- Starring: Lloyd Nolan; Mary Carlisle; Lynne Overman; J. Carrol Naish; Delmar Watson; Buster Crabbe
- Cinematography: Victor Milner
- Edited by: Anne Bauchens
- Production company: Paramount Pictures
- Distributed by: Paramount Pictures
- Release date: May 27, 1938
- Running time: 65 minutes
- Country: United States
- Language: English

Hunted Men is a 1938 American drama film directed by Louis King and written by William R. Lipman and Horace McCoy. The film stars Lloyd Nolan, Mary Carlisle, Lynne Overman, J. Carrol Naish, Delmar Watson and Buster Crabbe. The film was released on May 27, 1938, by Paramount Pictures.

== Plot ==
Joe Albany and James Flowers own a club, however James is corrupt. When Joe finds out about this, he kills James.

== Cast ==
- Lloyd Nolan as Joe Albany
- Mary Carlisle as Jane Harris
- Lynne Overman as Peter Harris
- J. Carrol Naish as Henry Rice
- Delmar Watson as Robert Harris
- Buster Crabbe as James Flowers
- Anthony Quinn as Legs
- Johnny Downs as Frank Martin
- Dorothy Peterson as Mary Harris
