= Carmencita Johnson =

American actress

- Born: March 31, 1923; Los Angeles, California
- Died: September 26, 2000 (aged 77); Ventura, California, U.S.
- Other names: Carmen Robertson
- Occupation: Actor
- Years active: 1923–1951
- Relatives: Dick Winslow (brother)

Carmencita Johnson (March 31, 1923 – September 26, 2000) was an American actress. She was best known as a child actress in the 1920s and 1930s.

== Early life and career ==
Johnson was born in Los Angeles, California, to Wynonah B. (née Breazeale) and Sidney K. Johnson. She had six siblings, Kenneth, Dick Winslow, Cammilla, Seessel Anne, Cullen, and Payne, all of whom also acted in films.

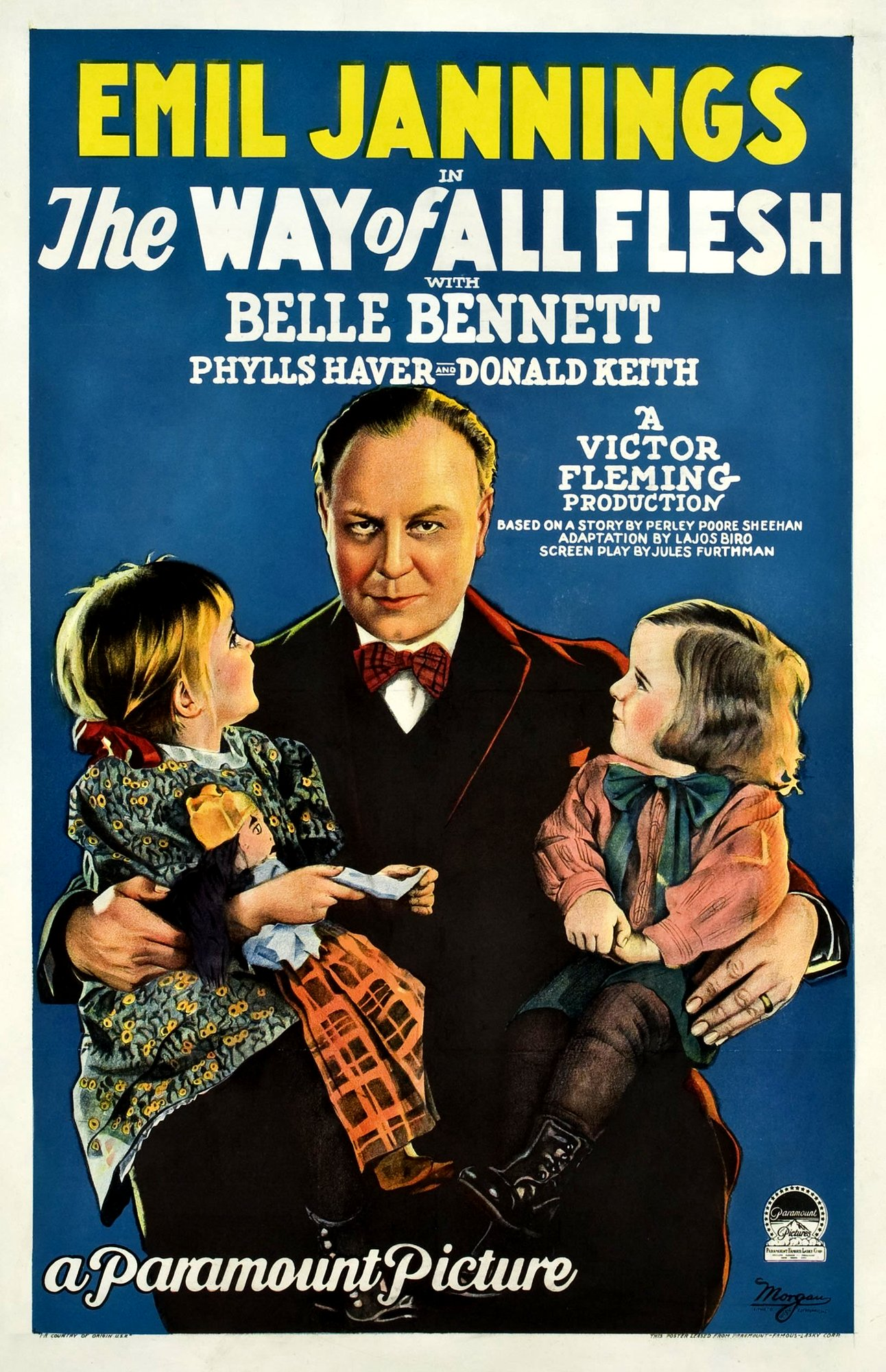
Johnson (left) in a poster for The Way of All Flesh (1927).

Beginning her career as a child actress, she appeared in the Our Gang short films when she was just a few months old. With a career spanning 28 years, she played bit parts in more than 70 films, notably The Winning of Barbara Worth (1926), The Way of All Flesh (1927), The Wind (1928), Mrs. Wiggs of the Cabbage Patch (1934), These Three (1936), Quality Street (1937), and The Beloved Brat (1938). Her last film job was an uncredited role in A Place in the Sun (1951).

== Personal life ==
Johnson was married to Jack Robertson from 1949 until her death in 2000. They had four sons, Nicolas, Drew, Winslow, and Cullen, and a daughter, Sydney.

== Later life and death ==
After marrying in 1949, Johnson subsequently retired from film work and became known as Carmen Robertson. She and her husband then moved to Long Beach to raise their five children. In 1961, they moved to Ojai, where she was prominent in the arts community. She helped establish the Ojai Studio Artists Tour and the Ojai Art Center. In 1985, she was selected Ojai Valley Woman of the Year.

On September 26, 2000, the Robertsons were traveling on Harbor Boulevard and turning onto Peninsula Street in Ventura when their 1990 Honda Civic was broadsided by a 1991 Chevrolet Blazer driven by Darin Acosta. The passenger side of their car, where she was sitting, received the brunt of the impact. She was taken to Ventura County Medical Center, where she died about five hours later.

== Filmography ==
- The Courtship of Miles Standish (1923)
- Cradle Robbers (1924)
- Dante's Inferno (1924)
- Darwin Was Right (1924)
- The Roughneck (1924)
- Dick Turpin (1925)
- Zander the Great (1925)
- Drusilla with a Million (1925)
- Thunder Mountain (1925)
- Rose of the World (1925)
- The Golden Cocoon (1925)
- The Shining Adventure (1925)
- The Honeymoon Express (1926)
- The Sign of the Claw (1926)
- The Winning of Barbara Worth (1926)
- The Auctioneer (1927)
- Annie Laurie (1927)
- The Way of All Flesh (1927)
- Fire and Steel (1927)
- The Country Doctor (1927)
- The Angel of Broadway (1927)
- Four Sons (1928)
- The Trail of '98 (1928)
- The Patriot (1928)
- Abie's Irish Rose (1928)
- The Awakening (1928)
- The Wind (1928)
- Ned McCobb's Daughter (1928)
- Blue Skies (1929)
- Wonder of Women (1929)
- Tom Sawyer (1930)
- Frankenstein (1931)
- Forbidden (1932)
- Polly of the Circus (1932)
- So Big (1932)
- Wild Girl (1932)
- Murders in the Zoo (1933)
- The Power and the Glory (1933)
- One Sunday Afternoon (1933)
- Doctor Bull (1933)
- Miss Fane's Baby Is Stolen (1934)
- Mrs. Wiggs of the Cabbage Patch (1934)
- Mystery Mountain (1934)
- Kid Millions (1934)
- The County Chairman (1935)
- The Good Fairy (1935)
- Bride of Frankenstein (1935)
- The Music Goes 'Round (1936)
- These Three (1936)
- The First Baby (1936)
- Little Miss Nobody (1936)
- Pepper (1936)
- Quality Street (1937)
- True Confession (1937)
- The Beloved Brat (1938)
- Keep Smiling (1938)
- High School (1940)
- Henry Aldrich for President (1941)
- Young America (1942)
- Reap the Wild Wind (1942)
- Duel in the Sun (1946)
- This Time for Keeps (1947)
- On an Island with You (1948)
- Hollow Triumph (1948)
- Neptune's Daughter (1949)
- Air Hostess (1949)
- A Place in the Sun (1951)
