= Taxi 13 =

1928 film

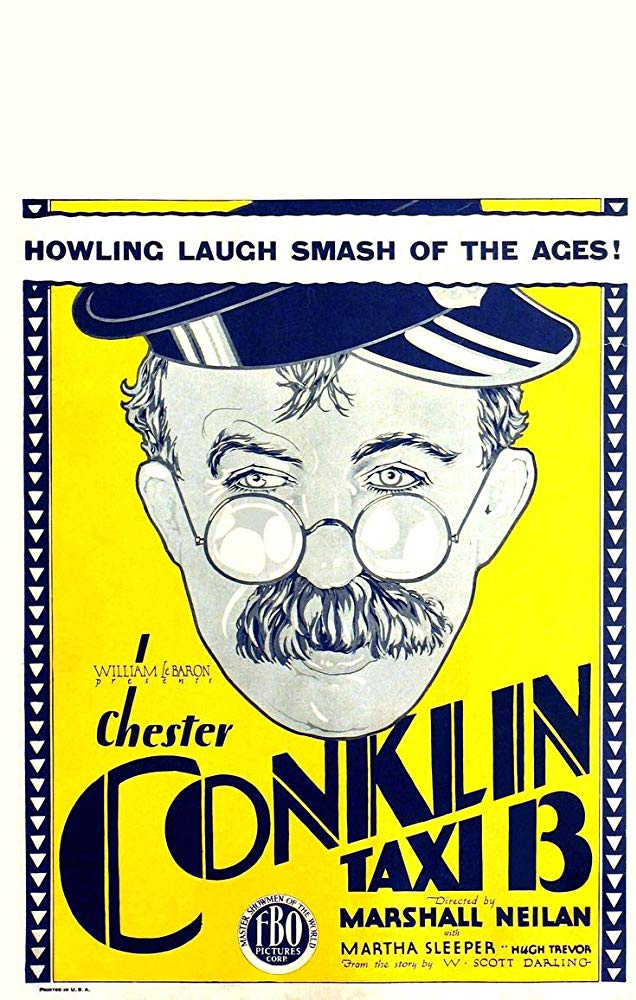
- Directed by: Marshall Neilan; James Graham(2nd Unit)
- Written by: Scott Darling (story, screenplay); George LeMaire (dialogue); Randolph Bartlett (titles); Garrett Graham (titles); Mildred Richter (titles)
- Produced by: Joseph P. Kennedy
- Starring: Chester Conklin
- Cinematography: Philip Tannura
- Edited by: Pandro S. Berman
- Music by: Josiah Zuro
- Distributed by: Film Booking Offices of America
- Release date: November 18, 1928
- Running time: 64 minutes; 7 reels
- Country: United States
- Languages: Sound (Part-Talkie) (English Intertitles)

Taxi 13 is a 1928 sound part-talkie film comedy produced and distributed by Film Booking Offices of America and directed by Marshall Neilan. In addition to sequences with audible dialogue or talking sequences, the film features a synchronized musical score and sound effects along with English intertitles. The soundtrack was recorded using the RCA Photophone sound-on-film system. The film stars Chester Conklin in what is FBO's first film with a pre-recorded soundtrack.

Once thought lost, a copy evidently survives at Cineteca Nazionale, Rome.

== Plot ==
Angus Mactavish, an eternally down-on-his-luck but good-hearted cabbie, struggles to support his frazzled wife Mrs. Mactavish and their ten hungry children with the meager earnings from his rickety, antique taxi. As the thirteenth son, Angus clings to superstition, proudly displaying "13" on his badge and license plate, insisting against all odds that it’s his lucky number.

His only real companionship at the cabstand is the slick and opportunistic Dennis Moran, who shares Angus’s garage but not his scruples. Meanwhile, internationally wanted jewel thief Berger returns from Europe and spots a rich society woman declaring a $30,000 pearl necklace at customs. Berger passes the tip to his gang, and suave hoodlum Mason is tasked with pulling off the heist.

Assigned to trail Berger is dogged police officer Dan Regan, who also happens to be courting Angus’s sharp-tongued daughter Flora Mactavish.

To avoid police suspicion, Mason hires unsuspecting Angus to pick him up behind the wealthy Addison estate after the robbery, paying $100—half in advance. Elated, Angus calls home with the news, and his wife faints at the prospect of sudden fortune. But Moran sees the shady handoff and smells opportunity.

Later that night, Berger and Mason break into the Addison home, blow open the safe, and snatch the pearls—but not before Officer Regan bursts in. A wild fistfight erupts. The crooks escape through a window and hijack Angus’s cab, forcing him to drive at gunpoint. Regan and Moran give chase in Moran’s battered hack, leading to a mad dash across the city, with Moran clinging to the back of his own cab while Regan takes the wheel in pursuit.

As Mason fires out the window, a bullet punches through Angus’s windshield. But at a railroad crossing, the crooks are forced to ditch the cab. Mason stashes the pearls under the seat upholstery and takes Angus’s ID card with his photo. The crooks escape on foot just as Moran arrives. Later, Moran finds the other half of the hundred-dollar bill in his cab and realizes something bigger is afoot.

At home, the Mactavishes prepare a feast to celebrate Angus’s supposed payday. But when he returns empty-handed and dazed, his wife guesses the truth but chooses to let the children enjoy the moment. Flora, furious after a spat with Regan over her plans to go dancing at "Jazzland," storms out—straight into the arms of Mason, her smooth-talking former suitor.

Pretending to be reformed, Mason brings Flora to a phony boarding house, actually the gang’s hideout. He reveals the truth about the pearls and the taxi, showing her Angus’s license photo. Back at the Mactavish home, Moran buys the other half of the hundred-dollar bill from Angus for $5 and uses it to get himself a new cab. Angus sells his own bullet-riddled cab to a junkman—who then sells it to a movie studio for $100 to wreck in a stunt scene.

Mason tries to convince Flora to run away with him. Regan tracks her down and brings Angus to confront the situation. They rescue Flora after a fierce fight with the gang.

Angus races to the movie set just in time to snatch the hidden pearls from his old cab as it tumbles over a cliff in a dramatic action sequence. The $5,000 reward is enough to start the Mactavish Taxi Company No. 13, and the film closes on the high note of Flora and Officer Regan's wedding.

At last, Angus’s unshakable belief in the luck of “13” has paid off—and so has his unwavering honesty.

== Cast ==
- Chester Conklin as Angus Mactavish
- Ethel Wales as Mrs. Mactavish
- Martha Sleeper as Flora Mactavish
- Hugh Trevor as Dan Regan
- Lee Moran as Dennis Moran
- Jerry Miley as Mason
- Charles Byer as Berger

unbilled

- Godfrey Craig as Mactavish Child
- George Dunning as Mactavish Child
- Louise Fazenda
- Jackie Sturnberg as Mactavish Child
- Billy Watson as Mactavish Child
- Coy Watson as Mactavish Child
- Delmar Watson as Mactavish Child
- Gloria Watson as Mactavish Child
- Harry Watson as Mactavish Child
- Louise Watson as Mactavish Child
- Vivian Watson as Mactavish Child

== Critical reception ==
A review in Harrison's Reports said, "This is neither funny enojugh to be called a comedy nor serious enough to be called a drama.' Despite a few good points, it added, "But on the whole it is not a particularly good picture".

== See also ==
- List of early sound feature films (1926–1929)
