= Evelyn Hall (actress) =

English-born American film actress

Evelyn Hall was an English actress in American films produced in the 1920s and 1930s.

She was born in Harrogate, England on Christmas Eve.

== Filmography ==
- My Best Girl (1927) as Mother Esther Merrill
- Our Dancing Daughters (1928) as Freddie's mother
- The Divine Lady (1928) as Georgiana Cavendish, Duchess of Devonshire
- Children of the Ritz (1929) as Mrs. Pennington
- Married in Hollywood (1929) as Queen Louise
- She Goes to War (1929)
- Blue Skies (1929) as Mrs. Semple Jones
- Captain of the Guard (1930) as Marie Antoinette, originally titled La Marseillaise (1930)
- Along Came Youth (1930) as Lady Prunella
- Oh, For a Man! (1930) as Emily
- Hell's Angels (1930) as Lady Randolph
- Lovers Courageous (1932) as Lady Blayne
- The Return of Dr. Fu Manchu (1932) as Lady Agatha Bartley
