= Kentucky (film) =

1938 film by Otto Brower, David Butler

- Directed by: David Butler
- Written by: Lamar Trotti; John Taintor Foote
- Produced by: Gene Markey; Darryl F. Zanuck
- Starring: Loretta Young; Richard Greene; Walter Brennan
- Cinematography: Ernest Palmer; Ray Rennahan
- Edited by: Irene Morra
- Music by: Louis Silvers
- Color process: Technicolor
- Production company: 20th Century Fox
- Distributed by: 20th Century Fox
- Release date: December 30, 1938 (U.S.)
- Running time: 96 minutes
- Country: United States
- Language: English

Kentucky is a 1938 American drama sports film with Loretta Young, Richard Greene, and Walter Brennan. It was directed by David Butler. It is a Romeo and Juliet story of lovers Jack and Sally, set amidst Kentucky horseracing, in which a family feud goes back to the Civil War and is kept alive by Sally's Uncle Peter.

== Plot ==
During the Civil War, Thad Goodwin Sr. (Charles Waldron) of Elmtree Farm, a local horse breeder, resists Capt. John Dillon (Douglass Dumbrille) and a company of Union soldiers confiscating his prize horses. He is killed by Dillon, and his youngest son, Peter (Bobs Watson), cries when the soldiers ride away with the horses.

75 years later, in 1938, Peter (Walter Brennan), now a crotchety old man, still resides on Elmtree Farm and raises horses with his niece Sally (Loretta Young). Dillon's grandson Jack (Richard Greene) and Sally meet, her not knowing that he is a Dillon. Sally's father, Thad Goodwin Jr., dies when his speculation on cotton drops. The Goodwins are forced to auction off nearly all their horses, and Jack offers his services to Sally as a trainer of their last prize horse, "Bessie's Boy", who is later injured.

Sally loses the farm, and Mr. Dillon makes good on his original bet with Thad Jr. and offers her any two-year-old on his farm. At her uncle's insistence, she reluctantly selects "Blue Grass" instead of the favorite, "Postman", and Jack trains him for the Derby. She learns of Jack's real identity and fires him as a trainer. During the race, Blue Grass runs neck and neck with Postman, but Blue Grass wins thanks to Jack's advice. Sally embraces Jack, but Peter collapses before the decoration ceremony and dies. At his funeral, Dillon eulogizes him and the American life of the past as "The Grand Old Man of the American Turf".

== Cast ==
- Loretta Young as Sally Goodwin
- Richard Greene as Jack Dillon
- Walter Brennan as Peter Goodwin
- Douglass Dumbrille as John Dillon – 1861
- Karen Morley as Mrs. Goodwin – 1861
- Moroni Olsen as John Dillon – 1938
- Russell Hicks as Thad Goodwin Sr. – 1861
- Willard Robertson as Bob Slocum
- Charles Waldron as Thad Goodwin – 1938
- George Reed as Ben
- Bobs Watson as Peter Goodwin – 1861
- Delmar Watson as Thad Goodwin Jr. – 1861
- Leona Roberts as Grace Goodwin
- Charles Lane as Auctioneer
- Charles Middleton as Southerner
- Harry Hayden as Racing Secretary
- Robert Middlemass as Track Official
- Madame Sul-Te-Wan as Lily
- Cliff Clark as Melish
- Meredith Howard as Susie May
- Charles Trowbridge as Doctor
- Eddie 'Rochester' Anderson as Groom
- Stanley Andrews as Presiding Judge
- Blue Washington as Bill
- Howard Hickman as Banker (uncredited)
- Larry Steers as Thaddeus' Friend (uncredited)
- Lillian Yarbo as Magnolia (uncredited)

== Notes ==
Walter Brennan won his second Oscar (Best Supporting Actor) in his role as Peter Goodwin. He was the first to do so in a color movie

== See also ==
- List of films about horses
- List of films about horse racing
