= Watson family =

Acting family

The Watson Family are an American family of nine sibling actors who are known as "the first family of Hollywood”. They were initially active as child actors in silent motion picture films.

With the deaths of Donnie "Beezer" Smith and Mildred Kornman in 2022, Garry Watson became the last living credited actor of the silent film era.

== Biography ==
When Mack Sennett's Keystone Studios, located just 600 feet from the Watson family home, required child actors for films, the father Canadian American J. C "Coy" Watson Sr. provided his children for casting. The Watson children worked with many big stars in the early Hollywood era, such as James Stewart, Lionel Barrymore, Fred Astaire, Shirley Temple, Katharine Hepburn and Henry Fonda. All six Watson brothers worked as press, newsreel and television photographers during their adult careers.

One of the siblings, Delmar Watson, stated in the Los Angeles Times in 1968, "The studio knew we had kids of all sizes, so when they needed a kid for one of their pictures, they grabbed one of us, and soon we were all working steadily".

== Legacy ==
The family members were collectively honored with a star on the Hollywood Walk of Fame, located at 6674 Hollywood Blvd. in Hollywood, California on April 22, 1999. Billy, Garry, and Louise were interviewed in July, 2017 about their experiences in Hollywood.

== The Watson Family's relatives (parents, grandparents and uncles) ==
The Watson family's grandfather, James Watson, was a photographer who took photos of Buffalo Bill on Broadway in 1904.

His son, J.C. (James Caughey) "Coy" Watson Sr. (born Ontario, Canada, April 14, 1890 – May 23, 1968), was a journeyman plasterer, who became a horse breaker for cowboy star Buck Jones and rented mounts to stars Hoot Gibson and Tom Mix, before getting into the special effects department, and became notable for designing The Flying Carpet that Douglas Fairbanks rode in the 1924 film The Thief of Bagdad, he married Golda Gladdis Wimer (1893–1979) on September 23, 1910. Their nine children went on to act in over 1,000 films, starting out as toddlers and child stars.

The eldest of the siblings, Coy Watson Jr., authored the book The Keystone Kid.

The Watson's uncle George Watson was the first full time photographer for the Los Angeles Mirror and opened "Acme Studio Pictures"

== The Watson Family siblings ==
Name	Birth name	Date of birth	Date of death	Actor's details
Coy Watson Jr.	James Caughey Watson Jr.	November 16, 1912	March 14, 2009 (aged 96)	His acting career started at 9 months old in Keystone Cops comedies in the 1913 silent film "The Prince of Silence".
Vivian Watson Wyatt	Vivian Evangeline Watson	February 19, 1915	December 18, 1994 (aged 79)	
Gloria Watson Dean	Gloria Amy Watson	July 4, 1917	June 1, 1997 (aged 79)	
Louise Watson Roberts	Mamie Louise Watson	November 22, 1919	June 5, 2018 (aged 98)	Debuted at age 8 in Taxi 13. Her last role was in 1997.
Harry Watson	Harry Railton Watson	August 31, 1921	June 8, 2001 (aged 79)	
Billy Watson	William Richard Watson	December 25, 1923	February 17, 2022 (aged 98)	
Delmar Watson	David Delmar Watson	July 1, 1926	October 26, 2008 (aged 82)	Appeared in over 300 films as a youth including Heidi starring Shirley Temple and with three of his brothers in the film Mr. Smith Goes to Washington from the 1940s worked as a new photographer, and worked with the Coast Guard as a cameraman during World War II
Garry Watson	Garry Armand Watson	September 27, 1928	Living	Debuted at age 1 in the 1929 film Drag and is the last living actor from the Hollywood silent film era.
Bobs Watson	Robert Ball Watson	November 11, 1930	July 27, 1999 (aged 68)	Probably best known for his role as "Pee Wee" in the 1938 Metro-Goldwyn-Mayer film Boys Town
