= The Beloved Brat =

1938 film directed by Arthur Lubin

- Directed by: Arthur Lubin
- Written by: Lawrence Kimble
- Story by: Jean Negulesco
- Starring: Bonita Granville; Dolores Costello; Donald Crisp
- Cinematography: George Barnes
- Edited by: Frederick Richards
- Music by: Howard Jackson
- Production company: First National Pictures
- Distributed by: Warner Bros. Pictures
- Release date: April 30, 1938
- Running time: 62 minutes
- Country: United States
- Language: English

The Beloved Brat is a 1938 American comedy-drama film directed by Arthur Lubin and starring Bonita Granville, Dolores Costello, and Donald Crisp. The screenplay was written by Lawrence Kimble from an original story by Jean Negulesco.

== Plot ==
Roberta Morgan has wealthy parents who give her plenty of material possessions but who basically ignore her. She acts out and torments the family butler Jenkins. The only person to take notice of her thirteenth birthday is her father's secretary, Williams.

She makes friends with a black boy, Pinkie White, and visits his home. She is impressed by the love Pinkie's mother, Mrs White, shows Pinkie and his sister Arabella. Roberta invites Pinkie to dinner to say thank you and Jenkins angrily throws out Pinkie.

Roberta's parents go away and Roberta starts behaving even more badly. Jenkins locks her in her room. She sets fire to it and escapes. Jenkins tracks her to Pinkie's house. On the way home in the car, they argue and Roberta grabs the steering wheel causing the car to swerve into an oncoming car and kill the driver.

Roberta tells the police that Jenkins was drinking and the butler is sentenced to prison for manslaughter. Guilt ridden she confesses that she made it up.

Roberta is sentenced to a special girls' school run by Helen Cosgrove. Helen manages to reform Roberta by getting her to help with younger students. When Roberta is allowed to return home, she refuses to leave. Her parents hear about this and change their ways.

== Cast ==
- Bonita Granville as Roberta Morgan
- Dolores Costello as Helen Cosgrove
- Donald Crisp as John Morgan
- Donald Briggs as Jerome Williams
- Natalie Moorhead as Evelyn Morgan
- Lucile Gleason as Miss Brewster
- Leo Gorcey as Spike Matz
- Emmett Vogan as Mr. Jenkins
- Loia Cheaney as Mrs. Jenkins
- Paul Everton as Judge Henry Harris
- Bernice Pilot as Mrs. White
- Stymie Beard as Pinkie White
- Meredith White as Arabella White
- Mary Doyle as Miss Mitchell
- Ellen Lowe as Anna
- Gloria Fisher as Boots

Uncredited

- Betty Compson as Eleanor Sparks
- Sarah Edwards as Miss Brundage
- Doris Bren as Jackie
- Carmencita Johnson as Estelle
- Ottola Nesmith as Mrs. Higgins
- Priscilla Lyon as Sylvia
- Lottie Williams as Marie
- Patsy Mitchell as Betty Mae
- Douglas Wood as Mr. Butler
- William Worthington as Dr. Reynolds
- Jessie Arnold as Nurse
- Mary Avery as Teacher
- Isabelle LaMal as Teacher
- Louise Bates as Mrs. Morgan's Guest
- Jesse Graves as Butler at Party
- Gordon Hart as Trial Judge
- Glen Cavender as Fireman
- Jack Mower as Fireman
- Cliff Saum as Fireman
- Al Duvall as First Cab Driver
- John Harron as Second Cab Driver
- Monte Vandergrift as Police Officer
- Victor Wong as Gardener

== Production ==
The film was initially titled Too Much of Everything. Dolores Costello signed in September 1937. It was her comeback picture for Warners. In November the title was changed to Girls on Probation. Arthur Lubin directed in November 1937. The title was finally changed to Beloved Brat in January 1938.

== Reception ==
Diabolique magazine in 2019 described it as "an entertaining star vehicle for Bonita Granville, playing a poor little rich girl who sets her room on fire, accidentally kills a motorist by grabbing the wheel of a speeding car, sends the racist family butler to prison for the crime by perjuring herself on the stand, is sent to reform school and… actually reforms... of cultural interest in that it shows a black mother character to be a far superior parent to Granville's parents, and Granville's best friend is a black boy."
