= Manual Arts High School =

Public secondary school in Los Angeles, California, United States

Manual Arts Senior High School
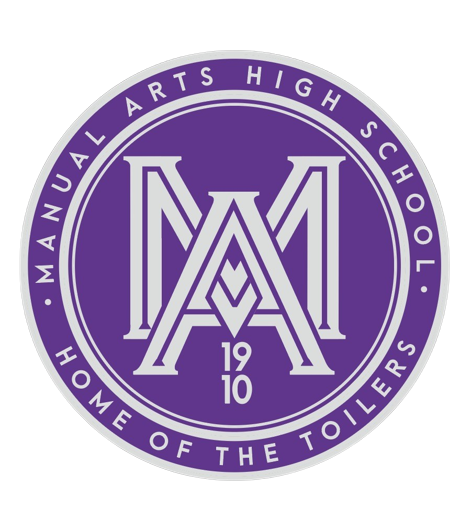

Location
- 4131 South Vermont Avenue; Los Angeles, California 90037; United States; 34.0083°N 118.29217°W

Information
- Type: Public
- Motto: "It Can Be Done"
- Established: 1910
- Locale: City, Large
- School district: Los Angeles Unified School District
- NCES District ID: 0622710
- NCES School ID: 062271003163
- Principal: Alejandro Macias
- Teaching staff: 61.78 (on an FTE basis)
- Grades: 9–12
- Enrollment: 1,001 (2024–25)
  - Male: 536
  - Female: 465
- Student to teacher ratio: 16.18
- Colors: Royal Purple and Gray
- Athletics conference: Exposition League; CIF Los Angeles City Section
- Mascot: Tommy Toiler
- Team name: Toilers
- Website: www.manualartshs.org

Manual Arts High School is a secondary public school in Los Angeles, California, United States.

== History ==
Manual Arts High School was founded in 1910 in the middle of bean fields, one-half mile from the nearest bus stop. It was the third high school in Los Angeles, California after Los Angeles High School and L.A. Polytechnic High School, and is the oldest high school still on its original site in the Los Angeles Unified School District. The school that would eventually become Lincoln High had been founded decades earlier but was still an elementary school at this time.

One of the school's first teachers was Ethel Percy Andrus (1911 - 1915). In 1916 Dr. Andrus became California's first female high school principal at Lincoln High School in East Los Angeles. She later founded AARP.

After three semesters in an abandoned grammar school building, Manual Arts High School was opened on Vermont Avenue. After the 1933 Long Beach earthquake, the entire campus was rebuilt, constituting the present Manual Arts High School campus adjacent to the Los Angeles Memorial Coliseum and USC.

It was in the Los Angeles City High School District until 1961, when it merged into LAUSD.

In 1995, "The Arts" became a Pacific Bell Education First Demonstration Site joining thirteen other demonstration sites in California, and in 1996 the school was named a California Distinguished School. In 1998, Manual Arts was officially granted Digital High School status.

The 2005–2006 school year opened with small learning communities (SLCs), three on each track totaling nine SLCs. Manual Arts was relieved by the opening of Santee Education Complex in 2005.

=== West Adams High School ===
The school was relieved in 2007 when West Adams Preparatory High School opened. During the same year, a section of the Manual Arts attendance zone was transferred to Belmont High School.

In July 2008, the school became part of MLA Partner Schools through LAUSD's newly created iDesign Schools Division. MLA Partner Schools, in collaboration with West Ed, will operate Manual Arts on a 5-year performance contract approved by the LAUSD School Board.

The school was expected be relieved by Central Region High School 16 (which became Dr. Maya Angelou High School (Los Angeles, California)) when that school opened in 2011, and by Augustus Hawkins High School when that school opens in 2012.

In the 2011–2012 school year, Manual Arts will return to a traditional school calendar schedule. As a result, several of the school's small learning communities will be restructured and the number of security on campus will be reduced. The 'Blewett Football Field is named in honor of James Blewett who was a standout Manual Arts football player and longtime Head coach with 9 Los Angeles City titles and 225 wins.

=== Post-pandemic recovery ===
From 2022 to 2024, Alejandro Macias served as principal of Manual Arts High School. During his tenure, publicly available district and state data documented improvements in selected school climate, college-readiness, English Learner reclassification, attendance-related, graduation, and accountability indicators. In the 2024 LAUSD School Experience Survey, teacher satisfaction was reported at 89%, compared with a five-year average of 66%; teachers reporting that students were college ready was 84%, compared with a five-year average of 72%; parents reporting opportunities for shared decision-making was 85%, compared with a five-year average of 78%; and parents reporting high-quality schooling was 88%, compared with a five-year average of 81.8%. California Student Aid Commission Race to Submit Dashboard data showed that Manual Arts Senior High School's FAFSA/CADAA completion rate increased from 44.6% in 2022 to 65.6% in 2023, and then to 82.6% in 2024, with completed applications rising from 127 to 170, then to 190. LAUSD School Explorer data showed that the school's English Learner reclassification rate increased from 6.2% in 2021–22 to 18.0% in 2022–23, and was 14.8% in 2023–24. LAUSD School Accountability Report Card data showed that Manual Arts Senior High School's chronic absenteeism rate for all students declined from 52.6% in 2022–23 to 41.2% in 2023–24, while its four-year cohort graduation rate increased from 76.0% to 88.6% during the same period. Manual Arts Senior High School exited Additional Targeted Support and Improvement status in the 2023–24 California Department of Education ESSA Assistance Status data.

== Student body ==
The racial makeup of the school is mostly Latinos and African Americans, and the neighborhood surrounding the school reflects the same makeup.

During the 2004–2005 school year, MAHS had 3,766 students, including:

- 3,054 Hispanics (81.1%)
- 701 African Americans (18.6%)
- 5 White Americans (1%)
- 4 Asian Americans (1%)
- 2 Native Americans (1%)

As of 2010, the school's dropout rate was 68%. More than 90% of students qualified for free or reduced-price lunch provided by the Los Angeles Unified School District.

== Notable alumni ==
- Jon Arnett (1935–2021), football player, member of College Football Hall of Fame, class of 1952
- Gus Arriola, cartoonist and creator of Gordo, class of 1935
- Verna Arvey, musician and writer
- Roy L. Ash, (1918–2012), president of Litton Industries, budget director
- Ted Bates, football player
- Paul Blair, professional baseball player, Yankees, Orioles, Reds
- Lyman Bostock, professional baseball player, class of 1968
- Steve Broussard, former NFL running back, class of 1985
- Nacio Herb Brown, songwriter, class of 1914
- Yvonne Brathwaite Burke, member of the United States House of Representatives and the Los Angeles County Board of Supervisors, class of 1950
- Frank Capra, film director
- Leland Curtis, artist, environmentalist, and Antarctic explorer
- Jimmy Doolittle, World War II aviator, class of 1914
- Carl Earn (1921–2007), tennis player
- Tom Fears (1922–2000), Pro Football Hall of Fame, Los Angeles Rams, class of 1940
- Earl C. Gay (1902–1975), Los Angeles City Council member, 1933–45
- Kathryn Grayson, singer and film actress
- Philip Guston, artist, class of 1930
- Robin Harris, comedian and actor, class of 1971
- Ed Heinemann, self-taught aerospace engineer and aircraft designer for Douglas Aircraft Company.
- Virginia Jaramillo, painter
- Jimmie Jones, football player
- Lynton Richards Kistler (1897–1993), lithography printmaker, artist.
- Goodwin Knight, 31st governor of California, class of 1914
- Stanley Knowles, Canadian Member of Parliament and New Democratic Party House Leader
- Leo K. Kuter, film art director
- Mittie Lawrence, actress
- Harold Lehman, artist. Class of 1931.
- Woodley Lewis, football player
- Ned Mathews, football player
- Gerson Mayen, midfielder for Chivas USA of Major League Soccer, class of 2005
- Jimmie McDaniel, African American tennis player and track and field athlete
- Ernie Orsatti, outfielder for the St. Louis Cardinals
- Victor Orsatti, Hollywood agent, film and television producer
- Dwayne O'Steen, football player
- Jerry D. Page, United States Air Force General, class of 1932
- Dwayne Polee, former professional basketball player, class of 1981
- Jackson Pollock, artist, class of 1930 (left before graduation)
- Marie Prevost, actress, class of 1916
- Mark Ridley-Thomas, Los Angeles Board of Supervisors member, class of 1972
- Rachel Robinson, American former professor and registered nurse, as well as the widow of professional baseball player Jackie Robinson
- Eugene Selznick (1930–2012), Hall of Fame volleyball player
- Oscar Sorto, MLS player for the Los Angeles Galaxy, class of 2012
- Andre Spencer (1964–2020), basketball player
- Scott Stephen, football player
- Irving Stone, author
- James B. Taylor, educator, class of 1945
- John Floyd Thomas Jr., serial killer
- Lawrence Tibbett, baritone, Metropolitan Opera, class of 1914
- Ansei Uchima, artist, class of 1940
- Paul Winfield, actor, Class of 1957
