= Ladies Love Brutes =

1930 film

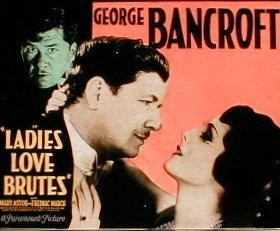
- Directed by: Rowland V. Lee
- Written by: Zoë Akins (play); Waldemar Young; Herman J. Mankiewicz
- Based on: Pardon My Glove by Zoë Akins
- Starring: George Bancroft; Mary Astor; Fredric March
- Cinematography: Harry Fischbeck
- Edited by: Eda Warren
- Distributed by: Paramount Publix Corporation
- Release date: May 15, 1930
- Running time: 80 min
- Country: United States
- Language: English

Ladies Love Brutes is a 1930 American pre-Code comedy film starring George Bancroft, Mary Astor, and Fredric March. The film was directed by Rowland V. Lee and based on the play Pardon My Glove by Zoë Akins.

== Plot ==
Ladies Love Brutes (1930)

== Cast ==
- George Bancroft as Joe Forziati, a New York building contractor
- Mary Astor as Mimi Howell, a socialite
- Fredric March as Dwight Howell, Mimi's ex-husband
- Margaret Quimby as Lucille
- Stanley Fields as Mike Mendino, a gangster
- Lawford Davidson as George Winham, Joe Forziati's lawyer
- Paul Fix as Slip, a member of Mike's gang
- Freddie Burke Frederick as Jackie Howell, kid

== Sources ==
- Hall, Mordaunt (May 16, 1930). "The Screen; The Rough Diamond". The New York Times.
