= Delmar Watson =

American actor (1926–2008)

- Born: David Delmar Watson; July 1, 1926; Los Angeles, California, U.S.
- Died: October 26, 2008 (aged 82); Glendale, California, U.S.
- Years active: 1926–1947

David Delmar Watson (July 1, 1926 – October 26, 2008) was an American child actor and news photographer.

== Life and career ==
Watson was one of nine children born to actor, stuntman, and pioneer special effects artist Coy Watson Sr. The family lived in the old Edendale area (now Echo Park) of Los Angeles. Watson attended Belmont High School.

Watson acted in Mr. Smith Goes to Washington alongside James Stewart and in Heidi with Shirley Temple. His eight siblings (five brothers and three sisters) also acted in films, including Coy Jr., Harry and Bobs. He and his brothers played the governor's sons in Mr. Smith Goes to Washington. The family was honored by the Hollywood Chamber of Commerce by placing the Watson family ("the First Family of Hollywood") star on the Hollywood Walk of Fame, at 6674 Hollywood Boulevard in Hollywood.

Watson edited and published five books: "Quick, Watson, The Camera' (1976), Los Angeles The Olympic City, 1932–1984 (1984), The 10th Olympiad – Japan (1984), Goin' Hollywood 1887–1987 (1988), and Delmar Watson's "Babe", The One and Only (1992).

Watson died from prostate cancer at his home in Glendale, California, on October 26, 2008, at the age of 82.

== Partial filmography ==
- Taxi 13 (1928) - Mactavish Child (uncredited)
- Blue Skies (1929)
- The Valiant (1929) - Little Boy Who Falls Down (uncredited)
- Lucky Star (1929) - Young Tucker (uncredited)
- Love, Live and Laugh (1929) - Little Boy (uncredited)
- The Lone Star Ranger (1930) - Baby Jones
- Outside the Law (1930) - The Kid
- Mothers Cry (1930) - One of the Williams Children - Age 3 (uncredited)
- Riders of the Purple Sage (1931) - Young Boy (uncredited)
- Compromised (1931) - Sandy Brock
- The Fourth Horseman (1932) - Young Boy (uncredited)
- Wild Girl (1932) - Willie - Red Pete's Boy (uncredited)
- Goldie Gets Along (1933) - Autograph Seeking Boy Outside Restaurant (uncredited)
- The Last Trail (1933) - Pupil with Tom's Hat (uncredited)
- To the Last Man (1933) - Tad Stanley (uncredited)
- The Right to Romance (1933) - Bill
- Fugitive Lovers (1934) - Tommy (uncredited)
- Straight Is the Way (1934) - Crying Boy (voice, uncredited)
- Chained (1934) - Boy Shipboard Swimmer (uncredited)
- Among the Missing (1934) - First Boy
- Gentlemen Are Born (1934) - Crying Boy (uncredited)
- The Painted Veil (1934) - Crying Boy (scenes deleted)
- Life Begins at 40 (1935) - Meriwether Son (uncredited)
- Silk Hat Kid (1935) - Child (uncredited)
- Freckles (1935) - Little Boy (uncredited)
- Annie Oakley (1935) - Wesley Oakley
- We're Only Human (1936) - Tommy Anderson (uncredited)
- Sutter's Gold (1936) - 3rd Newsboy (uncredited)
- The Country Doctor (1936) - Oldest Wyatt Boy (uncredited)
- Silly Billies (1936) - Martin
- Show Boat (1936) - Boy (uncredited)
- Old Hutch (1936) - Allie Hutchins
- The Great O'Malley (1937) - Tubby
- Maytime (1937) - Maypole Singer (uncredited)
- We Have Our Moments (1937) - Little Boy (uncredited)
- Let Them Live (1937) - Boy in Orphanage (uncredited)
- The Road Back (1937) - Boy (uncredited)
- It Happened in Hollywood (1937) - Boy (uncredited)
- Heidi (1937) - Peter
- 52nd Street (1937) - Young Benjamin (uncredited)
- Outlaws of the Prairie (1937) - Dart Collins Jr. (uncredited)
- Clipped Wings (1937) - Mickey Lofton - as a Boy
- Tovarich (1937) - Urchin Stealing Groceries (uncredited)
- Change of Heart (1938) - Jimmy Milligan
- Hunted Men (1938) - Robert Harris a.k.a. Butch
- Breaking the Ice (1938) - Reuben Johnson
- A Christmas Carol (1938) - Snowballer in Gang (uncredited)
- Kentucky (1938) - Thad Goodwin Jr. - 1861
- The Adventures of Huckleberry Finn (1939) - Joe (uncredited)
- You Can't Cheat an Honest Man (1939) - Boy with Slingshot (uncredited)
- The Family Next Door (1939) - Boy (uncredited)
- Young Mr. Lincoln (1939) - Admiring Boy in New Salem (uncredited)
- When Tomorrow Comes (1939) - Boy in Wagon (uncredited)
- Those High Grey Walls (1939) - Boy (uncredited)
- Here I Am a Stranger (1939) - Shoeshine Boy (uncredited)
- Mr. Smith Goes to Washington (1939) - Hopper Boy #2
- Legion of the Lawless (1940) - Lafe Barton Jr.
- His Girl Friday (1940) - Skinny (uncredited)
- I Take This Woman (1940) - Smaller Murphy Kid (scenes deleted)
- My Little Chickadee (1940) - Boy (uncredited)
- The Lady from Cheyenne (1941) - Toothless Boy (uncredited)
- New York Town (1941) - Hungarian Boy (uncredited)
- Among the Living (1941) - Newsboy (uncredited)
- Gas House Kids Go West (1947) - Young Boy (uncredited) (final film role)

== See also ==
- Watson family

== Bibliography ==
- Goldrup, Tom and Jim (2002). Growing Up on the Set: Interviews with 39 Former Child Actors of Film and Television. McFarland & Co. pp. 314–323. ISBN 1476613702.
- Holmstrom, John (1996). The Moving Picture Boy: An International Encyclopaedia from 1895 to 1995. Norwich: Michael Russell, p. 144-145.
