= Thunder Mountain (1925 film) =

1925 film by Victor Schertzinger

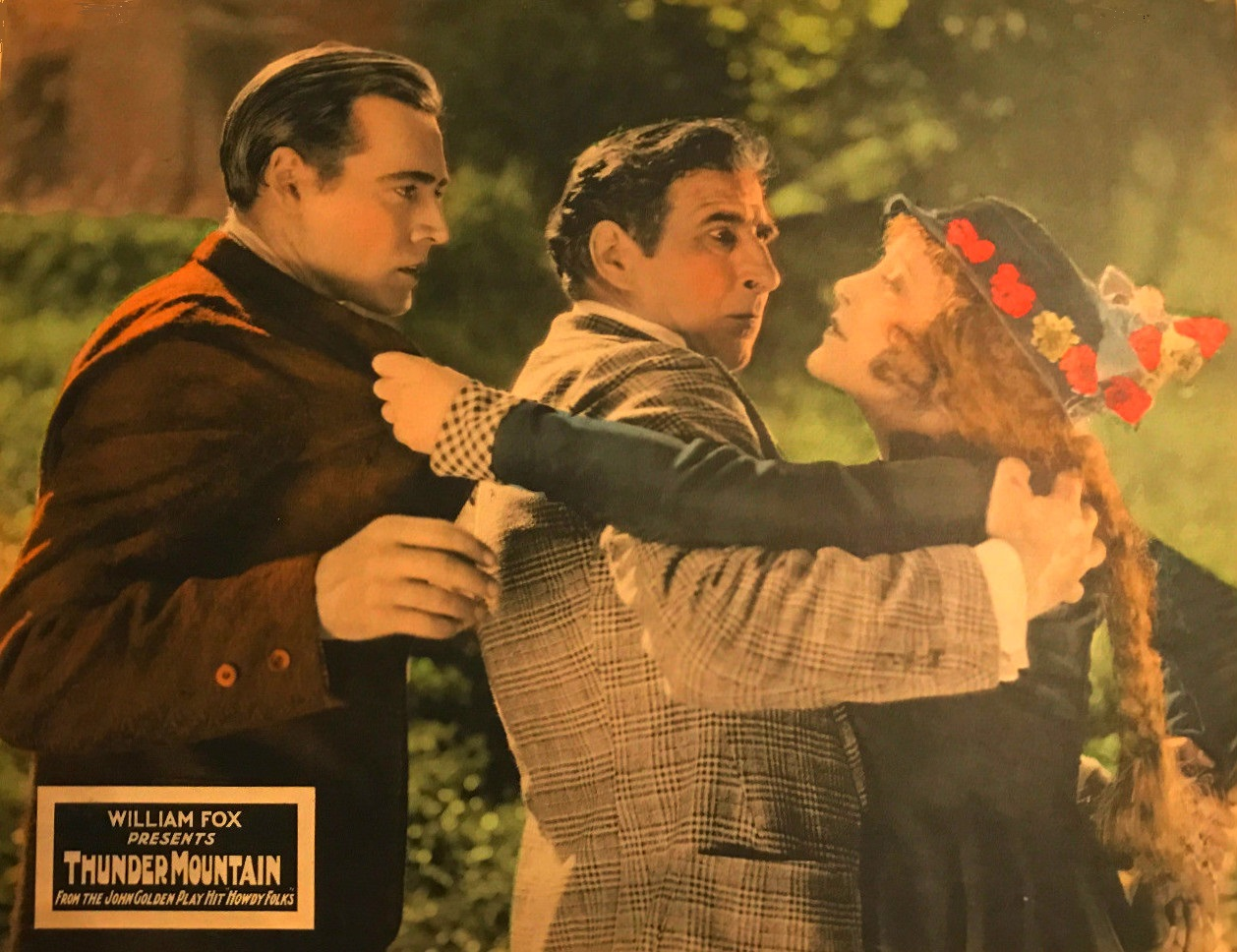
- Lobby card
- Directed by: Victor Schertzinger
- Screenplay by: Eve Unsell
- Based on: Thunder by: Peg Franklin; Elia W. Peattie
- Starring: Madge Bellamy; Leslie Fenton; Alec B. Francis; Paul Panzer; Arthur Housman; ZaSu Pitts
- Cinematography: Glen MacWilliams
- Production company: Fox Film Corporation
- Distributed by: Fox Film Corporation
- Release date: October 11, 1925
- Running time: 80 minutes
- Country: United States
- Language: Silent (English intertitles)

Thunder Mountain is a lost 1925 American drama film directed by Victor Schertzinger and written by Eve Unsell. It is based on the 1919 play Thunder by Peg Franklin and Elia W. Peattie. The film stars Madge Bellamy, Leslie Fenton, Alec B. Francis, Paul Panzer, Arthur Housman, and ZaSu Pitts. The film was released on October 11, 1925, by Fox Film Corporation.

== Plot ==
In Thunder Mountain, the inhabitants are poor and illiterate. In the village ignorance reigns and only Si Pace, one who lives by lending money, owns a "book". A feud divides two families, the Martins and the Givens. The preacher convinces Sam Martin to leave the country to get an education elsewhere. The young man returned three years later, determined to build a school. But Pace refuses to lend him the necessary money. Sam meets Azalea, a young circus actress who has escaped the circus and the brutality of its owner. Dressed in sequins and in tights, the girl dances for Si Pace in a vain attempt to raise money for the school. Discovered by Sam who doubts her, Azalea decides to leave with Joe Givens but, before their escape, Joe robs and kills Si Pace. All the inhabitants believe that the culprit of the crime is Sam and are preparing to hang him. The preacher, to stop them, detonates some dynamite he had placed in the mountains, saying that the explosion is the wrath of God for their behavior. Joe, in terror, then confesses his crime. Sam and Azalea get married and the man finally manages to build his school.

== Cast ==
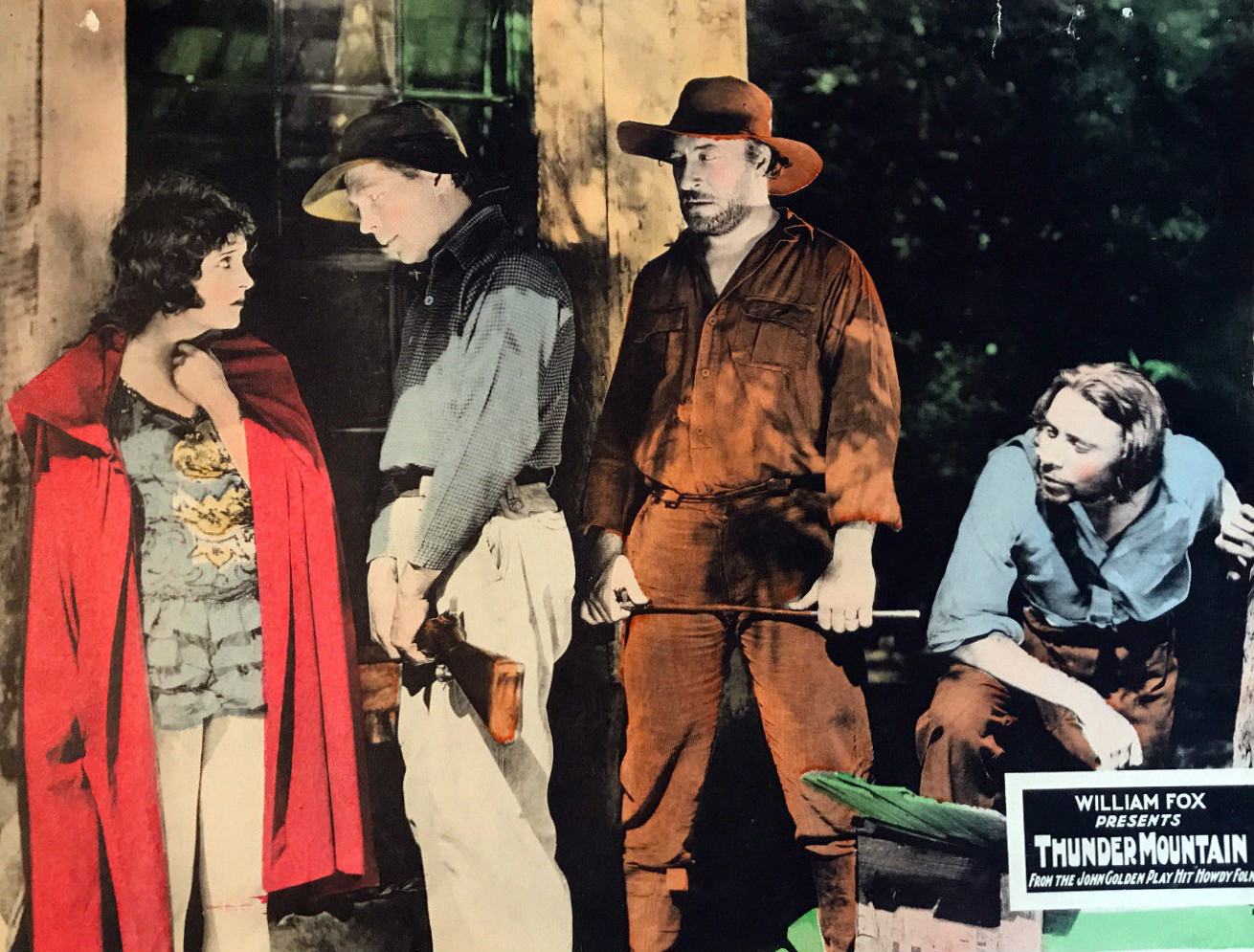
Lobby card

- Madge Bellamy as Azalea
- Leslie Fenton as Sam Martin
- Alec B. Francis as Preacher
- Paul Panzer as Morgan
- Arthur Housman as Joe Givens
- ZaSu Pitts as Mandy Coulter
- Emily Fitzroy as Ma MacBirney
- Dan Mason as Pa MacBirney
- Otis Harlan as Jeff Coulter
- Russell Simpson as Si Pace
- Natalie Warfield as Mrs. Coulter
- Carmencita Johnson as Baby (uncredited)

== Preservation ==
With no prints of Thunder Mountain located in any film archives, it is a lost film though a 5 minute fragment survives.
