= West Adams Preparatory High School =

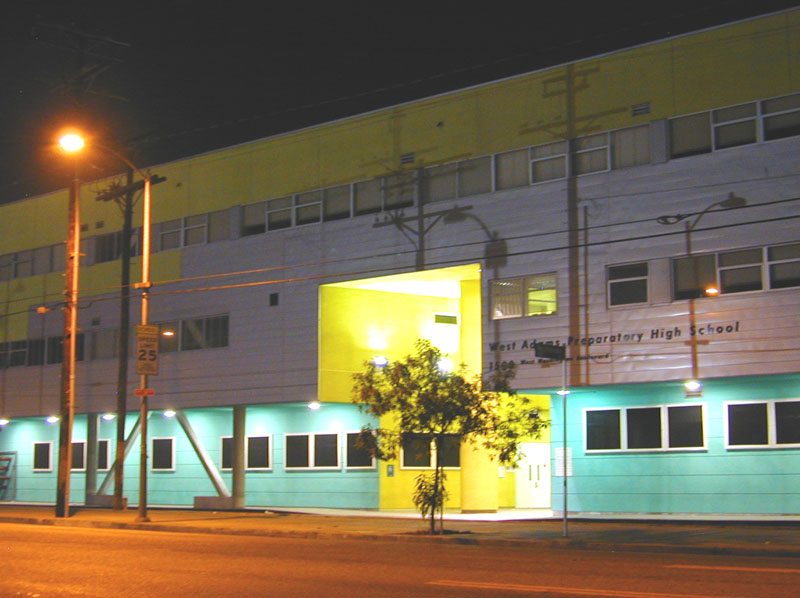
- West Adams Preparatory at night

Location
- 1500 West Washington Boulevard; Los Angeles, CA 90007; 34.039796°N 118.289851°W

Information
- Type: Public
- Established: 2007
- School district: Los Angeles Unified School District
- Principal: Erica Nava
- Staff: 67.51 (FTE)
- Grades: 9-12
- Age range: 14-18
- Student to teacher ratio: 20.00
- Colors: Black and Gray and Sky Blue
- Mascot: Panther
- Website: westadamshs.lausd.org

West Adams Preparatory High School is a secondary school in Central Los Angeles, California.

The school is a part of the Los Angeles Unified School District.

== History ==
In 2004, homes were demolished and lots were cleared in the West Adams neighborhood of Los Angeles for what was then referred to as "Central High School No. 2". A century-old neighborhood of houses and businesses were demolished to make room for a new $130 million 15-acre high school.

The school was originally opened to relieve the LAUSD's Belmont High School, Dorsey High School, Los Angeles High School, and Manual Arts High School.

West Adams Preparatory High School opened in the fall semester of 2007. The final budget was $176 million. The school features an all-weather football field, an all-weather track, a weight room, fitness center, swimming pool, two gymnasiums and lighted baseball and softball diamonds.

== School Structure ==
Though West Adams is a LAUSD high school, it was designed in part by MLA Partner Schools, a nonprofit organization.

== In Media ==
Several episodes of ABC's Jamie Oliver's Food Revolution are centered on West Adams, with Oliver attempting to influence the food options available to the students.
