= LA's Promise =

American nonprofit organization based in Los Angeles, California

Coordinates: 34.051940°N 118.245721°W

- Founded: 2003
- Founder: Mike McGalliard and John Holcomb
- Purpose: Education
- Location: Los Angeles, California
- Region served: South Los Angeles
- Key people: Mike McGalliard - Cofounder, Veronica Melvin - CEO, Stephen Prough - Co-Chair, Frank Marshall - Co-Chair
- Website: http://www.laspromise.org

LA's Promise (formerly known as MLA Partner Schools) is a 501c3 nonprofit organization based in Los Angeles, California. Its focus is on school reform and neighborhood revitalization. It currently operates two large public high schools and one middle school on a first-of-its-kind performance contract with Los Angeles Unified School District (LAUSD). These schools are West Adams Preparatory High School, Manual Arts High School and John Muir Middle School, with a total student enrollment of approximately 6,000 students. LA's Promise's first school, West Adams Preparatory High School, is applauded as a new model for non-charter public schools because of its unique programs and student culture.

LA's Promise is one of the first nonprofit organizations in Los Angeles to operate a non-charter public school with the opening of West Adams Prep in 2007. The school's model of shared leadership between LAUSD and LA's Promise became a new model teamwork between the private and public sectors for public school operation. In 2008, LA's Promise became one of four nonprofit organizations known as "Network Providers" working within LAUSD's newly created iDesign Schools Division to create the speedy turnaround of a select number of LAUSD's lowest performing schools. Among the four Network Partners is the Partnership for Los Angeles Schools (PLAS), a nonprofit created by Los Angeles Mayor Antonio Villaraigosa to drive his school reform agenda.

== Mission ==
LA’s Promise, a nonprofit organization, is working to radically shift the education, health and social outcomes for thousands of youth in one South Los Angeles community. This will accomplish a “neighborhood turnaround” in an area called LA’s Promise Neighborhood.

== History ==
LA’s Promise founders have served students in the South Los Angeles community for over 15 years. LA’s Promise began as an organization called Center for Innovative Education (IE) in 2003 with a 60-student cohort at Manual Arts High School. In the subsequent years, the organization expanded the number of students they served and reincorporated itself into MLA Partner Schools. Four years later, Manual Arts High School and West Adams High School joined MLA Partner Schools through the iDesign Division of the Los Angeles Unified School District. In 2011, John Muir Middle School joined MLA Schools through LAUSD’s Public School Choice.

=== Reorganization ===
In April 2011, MLA Partner Schools changed its name to LA's Promise. In March of the same year, the LAUSD school board voted to give control of John Muir Middle School to LA's Promise.

=== Neighborhood Turnaround ===
LA's Promise Neighborhood is an 8.2 square-mile enrollment zone that includes West Adams Preparatory High School, Manual Arts High School and John Muir Middle School. There are approximately 150,000 residents in LA's Promise Neighborhood and slightly over 20,000 youth between the ages of 12-18. The average student population is approximately 80% Latino and 20% African American.

== Schools ==
LA's Promise currently operates three schools: West Adams Preparatory High School, Manual Arts High School, and John Muir Middle School.

=== West Adams Preparatory High School ===
West Adams Preparatory High School opened and joined LA's Promise in 2007. The current principal is Dr. Jose Iniguez. There are 2,635 students enrolled in grades 9th-12th. Student demographics are 89% Latino, 10% African American and 1% Asian. West Adams Preparatory High School and LA's Promise (then called MLA Partner Schools) received increased notoriety through its association with famed chef and activist Jamie Oliver when they were featured as a primary plot element in the second season of his television show, Jamie Oliver's Food Revolution, on ABC. Jamie Oliver worked with students in West Adams Preparatory High School's culinary program and encouraged healthy eating habits at the school.

=== Manual Arts High School ===
Manual Arts High School opened in 1909 and joined LA's Promise in 2009. The current principal is Erica Thomas-Minor. There are 3,577 students enrolled in grades 9th-12th. Student demographics are 82% Latino and 18% African American. In November 2011, American pop group The Black Eyed Peas surprised 35 Manual Arts students involved in the Robo-Skunk team as they were listening to a presentation by Ubisoft explaining the makings of their new video game The Black Eyed Peas Experience. The surprise visit by Fergie, Taboo, and apl.de.ap was a result of a collaboration between Manual Arts High School, LA's Promise and FIRST– an organization devoted to inspiring young people to be science and technology leaders. Led by Manual Arts teacher, Mr. John Santos, the Robo–Skunk team is composed of Manual Arts High School students that are members of the Imaging, Sciences, and Technology Academy (ISTA) and the Math Engineering and Science Achievement (MESA) Program.

=== John Muir Middle School ===
John Muir Middle School opened in 1922 and joined LA's Promise in 2011. The current principal is Aminika Readeux. There are 1,818 students enrolled in grades 6th-8th. Student demographics are 76% Latino and 23% African American. In December 2011, John Muir Middle School hosted AEG's (Anschutz Entertainment Group) Season of Giving Day of Service in conjunction with City Year and LA's Promise. Over 100 volunteers and staff helped beautify the campus of John Muir Middle School by painting murals in the gymnasium, dance studio, hallways and exterior walls.
