= Belmont High School (Los Angeles) =

School in Los Angeles, California

Belmont Senior High School
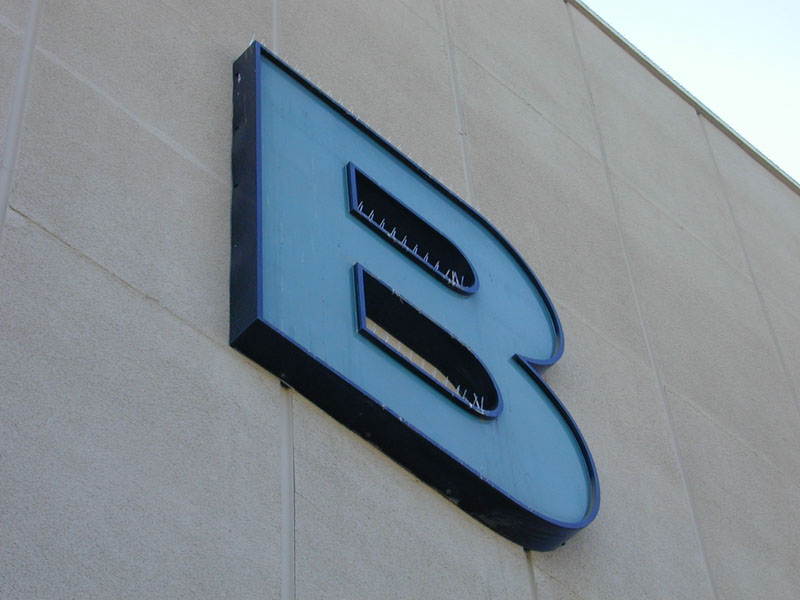

Location
- 1575 West Second Street; Los Angeles, California 90026; 34°3′42″N 118°15′45″W

Information
- Type: Public
- Established: September 11, 1923
- School district: Los Angeles Unified School District
- Principal: Elsa Mendoza
- Teaching staff: 36.28 (FTE)
- Grades: 9–12
- Enrollment: 599 (2022–2023)
- Student to teacher ratio: 16.51
- Campus: Urban
- Color
- Athletics conference: Central League; CIF Los Angeles City Section
- Nickname: Sentinels
- Rivals: John Marshall High School
- Website: Official website

Belmont Senior High School is a public high school located at 1575 West 2nd Street in the Westlake community of Los Angeles, California. The school, which serves grades 9 through 12, is part of the Los Angeles Unified School District.

== History ==
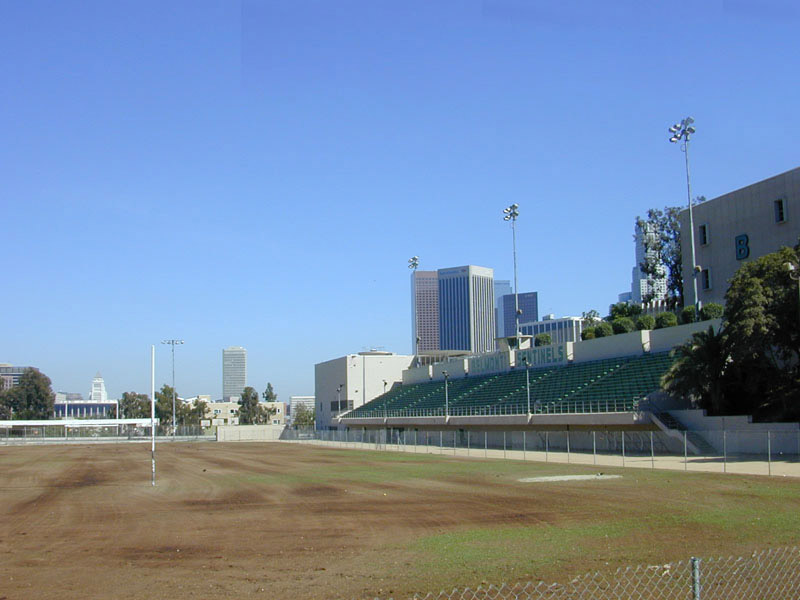
Belmont High School athletic field showing City Hall at the lower left corner

Belmont High School opened in 1923.

The Hotel Belmont was the first noteworthy building to stand atop Crown Hill, the present site of Belmont High School. Eventually, the hotel was abandoned, and later it was transformed into the private Belmont School for Girls. After the school was destroyed by fire, the grounds were left vacant, except for five oil wells and a pumping plant for the Los Angeles City Oil Field. On February 28, 1921, the Los Angeles Board of Education purchased the site for $100,000, for the purpose of constructing Belmont High School.

Belmont opened its doors on September 11, 1923, to about 500 students, all sophomores, and 28 faculty members. Most of the school's traditions were created by those pioneer students during the first months of the school's existence. The school newspaper conducted an election to select its name, with "Sentinel" easily winning over "Progress." To this day, Belmont's students are known as Sentinels. Those first students favored “Sentinels" because they were able to oversee the entire city from their "lookout" on Crown Hill. In another election, the school's colors, green and black, were selected over brown and white. A mosaic mural by Joseph Young is located on the wall of the main building.

The 1923 Beaux-Arts campus was designed by Stanton & Stockwell, who designed several large civic buildings at the Civic Center, Los Angeles.

It was in the Los Angeles City High School District until 1961, when it merged into LAUSD.

Belmont High School was once the largest school in California, due to the density of the Westlake district, which it served. It was also considered the largest school in the United States, with 6,342 students. What was formerly the attendance area for Belmont High School has now become the Belmont Zone of Choice, where students have the option of attending one of nineteen small learning communities or pilot schools located on four different campuses within the zone: Belmont High School, Miguel Contreras Learning Complex, Edward R. Roybal Learning Center, and Ramón C. Cortines School of Visual and Performing Arts.

Of these, the Miguel Contreras Learning Complex was opened in 2006, sharing Belmont's attendance zone, after LAUSD had begun as early as 2000 to devise plans to relieve Belmont of many of its students. The West Adams Preparatory High School opened in 2007, further relieving Belmont; a section of the Manual Arts High School attendance zone was transferred to Belmont. The High School for the Visual and Performing Arts (formerly known as Central Los Angeles Area High School 9) opened in 2008. Central Los Angeles High School 11 (Edward R. Roybal (formerly Belmont) Learning Center), Central Los Angeles High School 12, and the Felicitas and Gonzalo Mendez Learning Centers all opened in 2009.

Belmont underwent a major modernization beginning around 2005. The school was renovated, and new paint, bathrooms, doors, walls, and ceiling tiles were added. Facilities were also updated throughout the school campus to accommodate those with special needs (for example, the addition of wheelchair ramps). From the 2010 school year, it became a 6th through 12th grade school, with Sal Castro Middle School being located on the campus. The Belmont football stadium was named for Dentler Erdmann, its long-time faculty member.

In 2011 the school was restructured, with most teachers having to reapply for their jobs. The new academic program involves learning English, Spanish, and Mandarin.

== Belmont High School Small Learning Communities ==
Belmont High School hosts three Small Learning Communities (SLC's; also called academies) which specialize in a career pathway:

- LAAMPS (Los Angeles Academy of Medical and Public Service), with courses in first responders and medical terminology
- SAGE (Science, Art and Green Engineering), with courses in automotive technology, drafting, and computer assisted design
- Belmont Multimedia Academy, with courses in filmmaking, cartooning & animation, digital photography, digital imaging, and web page design

=== All Rankings ===
US News 2021 Rankings

- 100 in Los Angeles Unified School District High Schools
- 379 in Los Angeles metropolitan area High Schools
- 1,122 in California High Schools
- 9,907 in National Rankings

US News 2020 Rankings

- 153 in Los Angeles Unified School District High Schools
- 353 in Los Angeles metropolitan area High Schools
- 1048 in California High Schools
- 8,688 in National Rankings

== Demographics ==
Demographics of student body
Ethnic Breakdown	2021	2020
American Indian/Alaskan Native	0%	0%
Hispanic and Latino American	88%	87%
Black	2%	2%
Asian American	7%	6%
Native Hawaiian or other Pacific Islander Americans	0%	0%
White	3%	3%
Multiracial Americans	0.5%	1%
Female	40%	40%
Male	60%	60%

As of 2016 the school had about 1,000 students, 25% of whom were of Central American origin. Some of those students immigrated without their parents.

As of December 2013 the school had fewer than 1,000 students.

The school was built for a capacity of 2,500 students, and when it opened in 1923 it had about 500 students. Due to an enrollment decline in the 1950s the Los Angeles City High School District considered closing Belmont. By the 1990s the school had its peak enrollment, 5,500 students, making it California's largest high school and one of the largest in the United States. During that period many students were reassigned to and sent on buses to schools in the San Fernando Valley because there were too many students in Belmont. In the 1997–1998 school year the school had 5,160 students. At the time, the school's dropout rate was 65% and in terms of its four-year graduation rate it ranked lower than 96% of Los Angeles County high schools. 72% of the enrolled students took free lunches.

The enrollment declined in the 2000s due to the opening of charter schools and LAUSD opening schools to relieve capacity. In 2001 the LAUSD began a building campaign to relieve the capacity of the school.

Due to overcrowding, Belmont had a year-round schedule for 26 years, until the 2008 opening of the Edward R. Roybal Learning Center. After the opening Belmont resumed having a traditional two-semester school schedule.

== Academic performance ==
In 2011 the school had an Academic Performance Index (API) of 639, an improvement of almost 100 points in a two-year period. Jason Song of the Los Angeles Times wrote that the score was "still poor". In 2013 its API was 668, an increase of over 175 points from the 2002 figure. The State of California API goal is 800.

== Notable faculty ==
- Sal Castro (1933–2013), activist (faculty)

== Notable alumni ==
- Susan Ahn Cuddy (1915–2015) U.S. Navy, First Asian-American Female Navy Officer, First Female gunnery officer, WWII
- Veronica Porché Ali, (1955–present), actress, model. Former wife of Muhammad Ali, an american professional boxer.
- Patrick Argüello (1943–1970), US-Nicaraguan national killed in the attempted hijack of an El Al flight, as carried out by the PFLP.
- John Beradino (1917–1996) (born Giovanni Berardino), actor, major league baseball player
- Ron Botchan, NFL official
- Irwin Corey (1914–2017), American comic, film & television actor, and activist
- James C. Corman (1920–2000), Congressman, Los Angeles City Councilman
- Richard Crenna (1926–2003), actor
- Brad Dexter (1917-2002), actor and film producer
- Thelma "Tiby" Eisen (1922-2014), baseball player
- Craig Ellwood (1922–1992), architect
- Abel Fernandez (1930–2016), actor with Robert Stack on The Untouchables
- Mike Frankovich (1909–1992), film producer
- Robert F. Foley. Medal of Honor recipient, retired as U.S. Army Lieutenant General
- Murray Fromson, CBS News correspondent and USC professor
- Luis (Lou) Gomez, MLB player
- Odetta Holmes (1930–2008), folk singer, activist
- David A. Karnofsky (1914–1969) physician, medical oncologist, known for the Karnofsky score
- Young-Oak Kim (1919–2005), highly decorated combat veteran; 1937 graduate
- Willa Kim (1917–2016), 2007 Theatre Hall of Fame inductee, two time Tony and Emmy Award-winning costume designer and 1935 graduate of Belmont; the older sister of Young-Oak Kim.
- Ralph Lazo (1924–1992), civil rights activist
- Glenard P. Lipscomb (1915–1970), Congressman
- Robert Lyles, NFL player
- John McCarthy (1927–2011), computer scientist, coined the term artificial intelligence, invented LISP family of programming languages, won the ACM Turing award in 1971
- Loren Miller Jr., Los Angeles County Superior Court Judge
- Ricardo Montalbán (1920–2009), actor
- Anthony Quinn (1915–2001), actor
- Mort Sahl, humorist
- Reiko Sato, (1931–1981), dancer and actress
- William Sidell (1915–1994), labor leader
- Jack Smith (1916–1996), columnist, journalist
- Mike Stoller, songwriter
- Robert Mitsuhiro Takasugi, United States district judge
- Coy Watson Jr. (1912–2009), child actor, Hollywood Walk of Fame, the Watson Family
- Delmar Watson (1926–2008), actor, photo-journalist, Hollywood Walk of Fame, the Watson Family
- Harry R. Watson (1921–2001), actor, photo-journalist, Hollywood Walk of Fame, the Watson Family
- Jack Webb (1920–1982), producer, director, actor
