= Eagle Rock High School =

Location
- 1750 Yosemite Drive, Los Angeles, California 90041; Eagle Rock, Los Angeles, California; 34.1320°N 118.2053°W

Information
- Type: Public
- Established: 1927
- School district: Los Angeles Unified School District
- Dean: Vincent Vergara
- Principal: Derek Steinorth
- Staff: 107.12 (FTE)
- Faculty: 150
- Grades: 7-12
- Enrollment: 2,059 (2023-2024)
- Student to teacher ratio: 19.22
- Campus: Urban
- Colors: Green; Gray; White
- Athletics conference: Northern League; Los Angleles City Section; CIF
- Nickname: Eagles
- Rival: Historically Franklin High School and more recently John Marshall High School included by many. Most agree that Franklin are football rivals, and Marshall are rivals for all other sports.
- Newspaper: Eagle's Scream
- Yearbook: Totem
- Website: eaglerockhs.lausd.org

Eagle Rock High School (ERHS) is a public school located in the Eagle Rock neighborhood of northeast Los Angeles, California.

== History ==
The school opened its doors on September 12, 1927. It was replaced by a new building in 1970.

It was in the Los Angeles City High School District until 1961, when it merged into LAUSD.

Eagle Rock was relieved of overcrowding when Central Region High School 13, also known as Taylor Yard and then as Sonia M. Sotomayor Learning Academies opened in 2011.

== Student body ==
Eagle Rock High School serves the Northeast Los Angeles neighborhoods of Eagle Rock and Mt. Washington, as well as parts of Highland Park and Glassell Park.

The student body is estimated to be 60% Hispanic, 28% Asian, 9% Non-Hispanic White, 2% Black, 0.4% Pacific Islander/Native American, and 0.04% Mixed Race. U.S. News & World Report estimates that 65% of students are economically disadvantaged, meaning they are eligible for the free- or reduced-lunch program. Out of the student body, 51% are eligible for the free lunch program—capped at a household income of $29,995 for a family of four—while 14% of students are eligible for the reduced lunch program—capped at a household income of $42,643 for a family of four.

== Notable alumni ==
- Guy Allison (born 1959), musician
- Roger Bobo, musician
- Luis Bonilla, musician
- Conrad Buff IV, Oscar winning film co-editor, "Titanic" (1997)/ co-editor, "Terminator 2: Judgement Day" (1991)
- Alex Cabagnot, PBA basketball player
- Lisa Ann Cabasa Actress: Twin Peaks, Wild at Heart, Dark Angel, Young MC Bust a Move music video, Tone Loc Funky Cold Medina music video.
- Mark Caguioa, PBA basketball player
- Dan Cantore, Olympic weightlifter
- Mike Carter (born 1955), American-Israeli basketball player
- Pimbongkod Chankaew, beauty queen
- Scott Colley (born 1963), musician
- James Corrigan, cross country runner
- Bob Hall, car designer and journalist
- Hudson Houck (born 1943), NFL football coach
- Roger Ingram (born 1957), musician and author
- Jere H. Lipps (born 1939), scientist
- Buddy Noonan, TV producer
- Darian Sahanaja, musician
- Robert Shaw, conductor
- Marley Shelton, actor
- Minh Thai, former world record holder/fastest time to solve a Rubik's cube
- Robert Totten, television/film director
- Tui St. George Tucker, composer
- Carlos Vega, musician
- The Linda Linda’s, rock band

Lindsay Wagner (attended), actor
