= Barra Santos =

Restaurant in Los Angeles, California, U.S.

- Interactive map of Barra Santos

Restaurant information
- Food type: Portuguese
- Location: 1215 Cypress Avenue, Los Angeles, California, 90065, U.S.
- Coordinates: 34°05′44″N 118°13′41″W

Barra Santos is a restaurant in Cypress Park, Los Angeles, in the U.S. state of California. It serves Portuguese cuisine. In 2024, Barra Santos was a semifinalist in the Best New Restaurant category of the James Beard Foundation Awards.

== See also ==
- Lists of restaurants
