= Elysian Valley, Los Angeles =

Elysian Valley Frogtown
- Neighborhood of Los Angeles
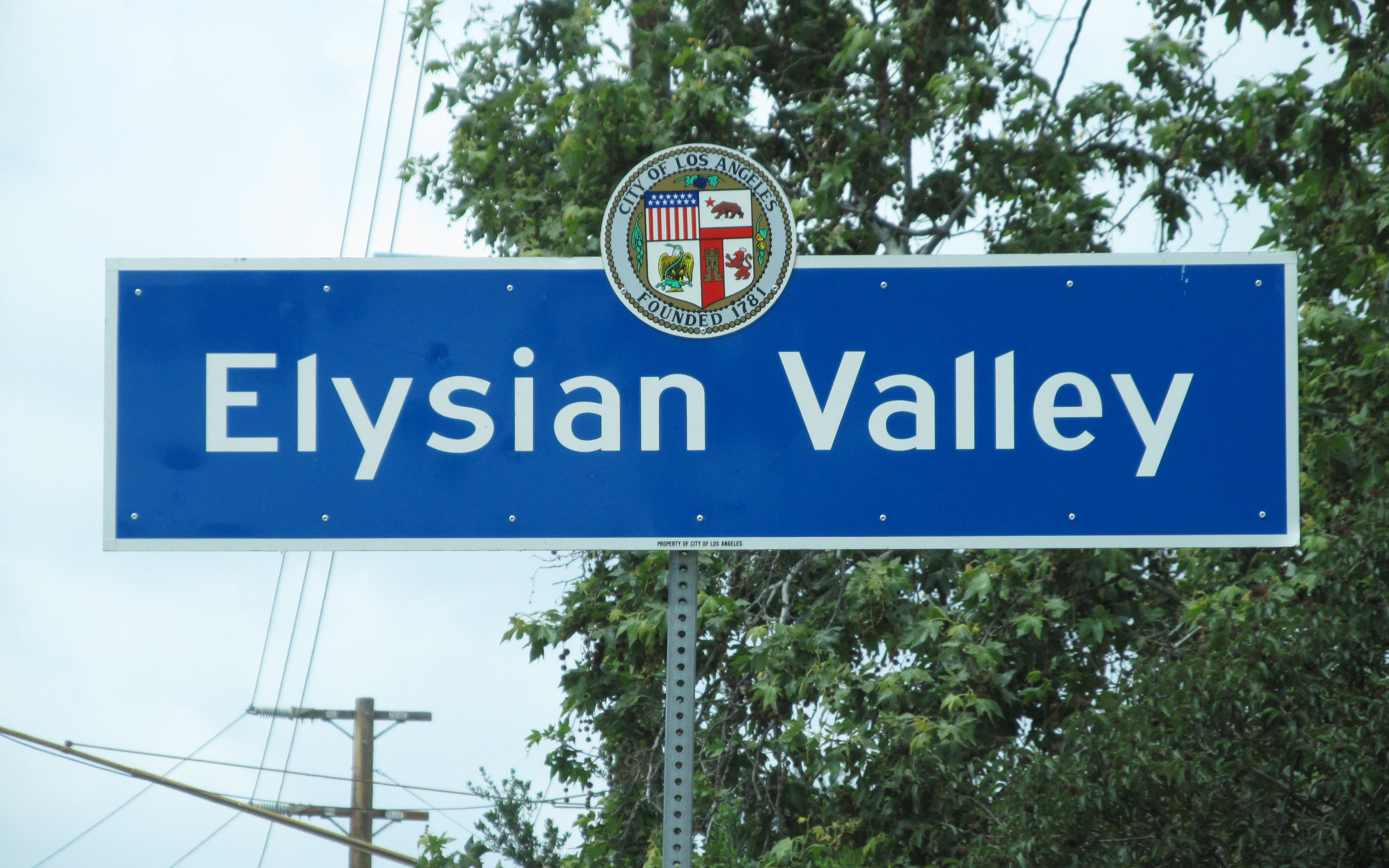
- Elysian Valley neighborhood sign, located on Riverside Drive at Egret Park

- Location within Northeast Los Angeles
- Coordinates: 34.09445°N 118.240366°W
- Country: United States of America
- State: California
- County: Los Angeles
- Time zone: Pacific
- Zip Code: 90031, 90039
- Area code: 323

Elysian Valley, commonly known as Frogtown, is a neighborhood in Central Los Angeles, California, adjoining the Los Angeles River. It has a series of parks maintained by the Mountains Recreation and Conservation Authority (MRCA), as well as The Elysian Valley Bicycle & Pedestrian Path. The Frogtown Art Walk is a biennial event managed by the Elysian Valley Arts Collective to celebrate local area artists.

== History ==
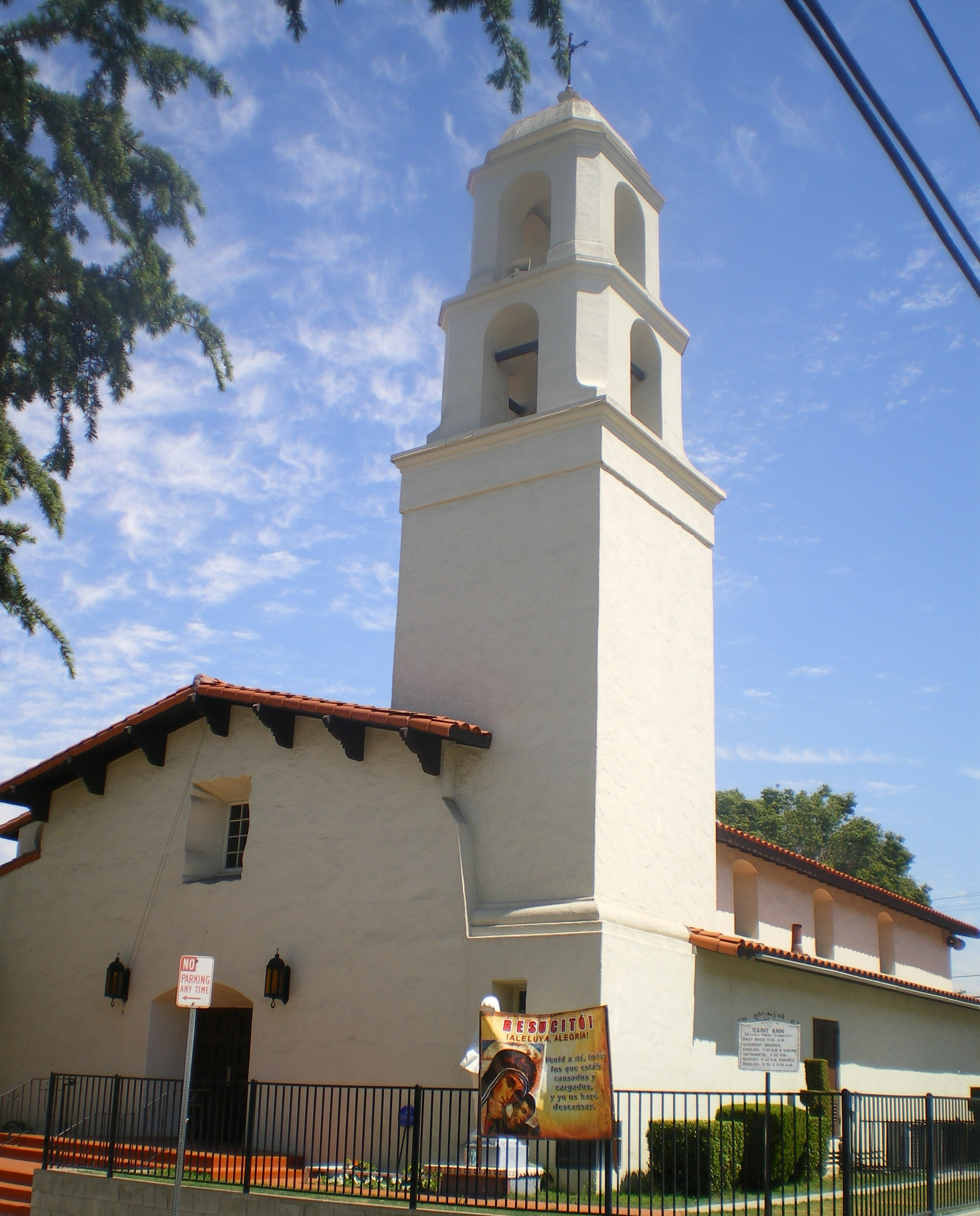
St. Ann's Catholic Church, 2012

In the late 1800s and early 1900s, Elysian Valley was home to a number of farms. These farmers carted their produce down the road to sell in the markets of downtown Los Angeles and emerging suburbs like Angelino Heights. In 1910, the city annexed the farmland. In 1911, Southern Pacific Railroad's Taylor Yard was built just across the river. In 1913, the land started being subdivided for residential development.

Sometime between the 1930s and 1960s, the neighborhood became known as Frogtown when swarms of Western toads invaded its streets. In 1962, the Golden State Freeway removed a section of the western flank of Frogtown, further isolating it from nearby neighborhoods.

Michael Todd, one of the unofficial founding fathers of the Frogtown art scene, has had a studio in the neighborhood since the mid-1980s. By 2014, artists Shepard Fairey, Mark Grotjahn, and Thomas Houseago had opened studios in the community.

In July 2019, it was reported that Frogtown was undergoing "inexorable change" due to gentrification. With the announcement of a $1 billion restoration project for the Los Angeles River, also known as Alternative 20, many residents felt the pressure of new investment and development in the community, causing them to organize for lower density. This push for low density from within the neighborhood is not new and was documented in an article as far back as 1987.

== Geography ==
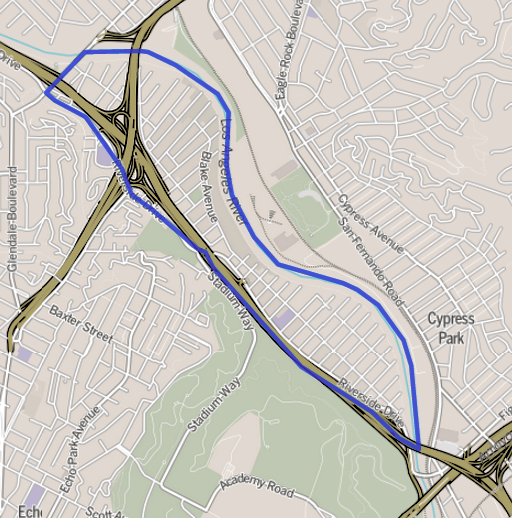
Elysian Valley as drawn by the Los Angeles Times

Elysian Valley is a three-mile long "peanut-shaped pocket of land" sandwiched between the Los Angeles River on the north, and the Golden State Freeway on the south. Because of the freeway wall, the neighborhood is accessible only by entering at Fletcher Drive on the north or Riverside Drive on the south.

According to the Los Angeles Times, Elysian Valley's "distinct character has been shaped by its geographic isolation". In 1962, the Golden State Freeway was built next to Elysian Valley, isolating it from surrounding neighborhoods.

The neighborhood is flanked on the north by Atwater Village, on the northeast and east by Glassell Park, on the southeast by Cypress Park, on the south and southwest by Elysian Park, and on the west and northwest by Echo Park and Silver Lake.

== Demographics ==
The 2000 U.S. census counted 7,387 residents in the 0.79-square-mile neighborhood—an average of 9,354 people per square mile, about the same population density as the rest of the city. In 2008, the city estimated that the population had increased to 7,781. The median age for residents was 31, about average for Los Angeles, but the percentage of residents aged 11 to 18 was among the county's highest.

The neighborhood is moderately diverse ethnically, and the percentage of Asians and Latinos is comparatively high. The breakdown in 2000 was Latinos, 61.0%; Asians, 35.9%; whites, 9.7%; blacks, 1.1%; and others, 2.6%. Mexico was the most common places of birth for the 47.5% of the residents who were born abroad, a high figure compared to rest of the city.

The median yearly household income in 2008 dollars was $49,013, about the same as the rest of Los Angeles. The average household size of 3.4 people was high for the city of Los Angeles. Renters occupied 52.2% of the housing stock, and house- or apartment-owners 47.8%.

Seventeen percent of the neighborhood residents aged 25 and older had earned a four-year degree by 2000, an average figure for the city.

== Education ==
Los Angeles Unified School District has two schools in Elysian Valley:

- Dorris Place Elementary — 2225 Dorris Place
- Allesandro Elementary — 2210 Riverside Drive

== Government ==
- Elysian Valley is part of City Council District 13.
- The Elysian Valley Riverside Neighborhood Council is the official neighborhood council representing the area.

== Parks and recreation ==
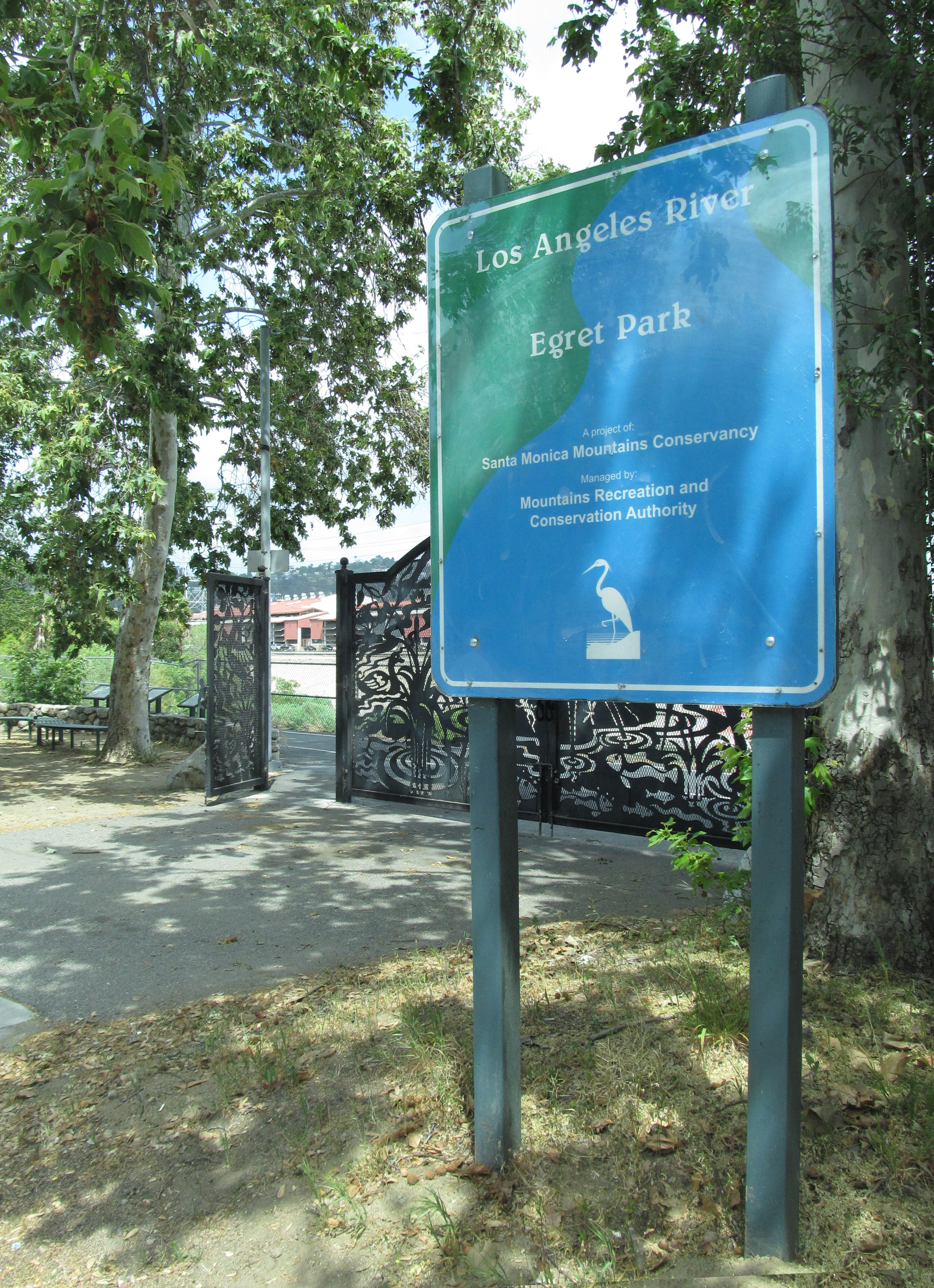
Riverside Drive Entrance to Egret Park

The City of Los Angeles operates one park in the community:

- The Elysian Valley Recreation Center - Operated by the Department of Recreation and Parks, it offers a variety of programs and amenities, including sports and fitness programs, cultural programs, and a range of recreational facilities. These include a stage, an auditorium, a baseball diamond, a playground, and handball courts.

Additionally, Elysian Valley has a series of parks maintained by the Mountains Recreation and Conservation Authority (MRCA):

- Egret Park — features a viewpoint, native plantings, and interpretive displays along with access to the Los Angeles River bicycle path.
- Gateway Park - Built in 1995, it was the first park along the Los Angeles River designed and built by the Santa Monica Mountains Conservancy. The park provides access to the natural streambed portion of the river, as well as the Los Angeles River Bike Path. MRCA completed a renovation of Gateway Park in 2024.
- Lewis MacAdams Riverfront Park - Formerly Marsh Park, is part of the Los Angeles River Greenway. The park includes play equipment, a loop trail with 13 outdoor fitness equipment stations, two outdoor classrooms, an open-air pavilion, and a skate park.
- Rattlesnake Park — The park has an entrance off Fletcher Drive, south of the LA River. The "Great Heron Gates" at the entrance are an artistic interpretation of the wildlife of the Los Angeles River.
- Steelhead Park — has a small outdoor amphitheater for education. Steelhead trout adorn the top of the park's wrought-iron fencing.

== Landmarks and attractions ==
- Glendale Narrows Elysian Valley Bike Path - a 7.4-mile route along the Los Angeles River, which includes a section with a natural "soft-bottom" riverbed. Portions of the path run adjacent to a concrete bank and pass alongside I-5 traffic. The path begins at the Bette Davis picnic area in Griffith Park and ends at the Los Angeles River Center and Gardens in Cypress Park.
- LA River Path Project - a bicycle and pedestrian path along an approximately eight-mile stretch of the Los Angeles River. It begins in Elysian Valley and ends in the City of Maywood.
- Taylor Yard Pedestrian and Bicycle Bridge – The distinctive steel orange bridge connects Elysian Valley to the Taylor Yard Park on the opposite side of the river. Designed for bike and pedestrian use, the bridge broke ground in April 2019 and opened to the public in March 2022.

== Arts and culture ==
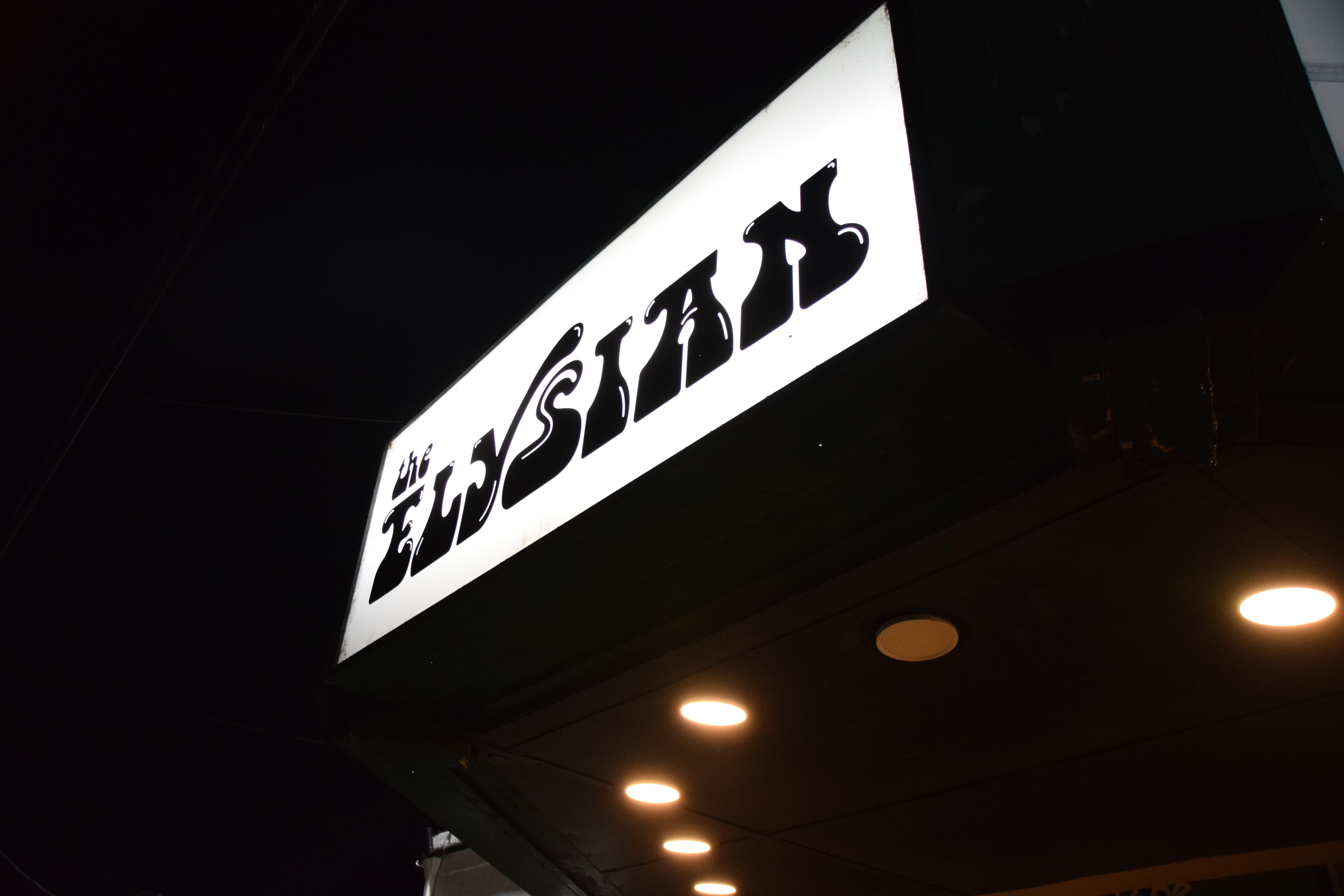
Marquee of The Elysian in 2026

- The Elysian - Originally opened in 1927 as a silent movie theater, it stopped projecting films in 1954. The theater later became a live performance venue known by various names: The Studio Theater, The Colony Theater, and later the Knightsbridge Theatre. It reopened in 2021 as The Elysian.
- The Elysian Valley Arts Collective (EVAC) - Also known as Frogtown Arts, The Elysian Valley Arts Collective Founded in 2008, EVAC was created "as an umbrella organization to support the Frogtown Artwalk and events related to arts and arts education". Funding is provided in part by grants from the California Arts Commission, the National Endowment for the Arts, and the City of Los Angeles Department of Cultural Affairs.

== Events ==
- Frogtown Art Walk — a biennial event organized by The Elysian Valley Arts Collective to celebrate local area artists. The event draws thousands of visitors to the neighborhood.

== Religion ==
Religious congregations include:

- St. Ann Catholic Parish — 2302 Riverdale Avenue. Opened in 1937.
- St. Mary Coptic Catholic Church - 2701 Newell Avenue.

== In media ==
According to the Los Angeles Times, Dorris Place Elementary is "probably the most filmed elementary school in the United States." The school was built in 1925. With elegant brick work and dark wood trim, it has an "East Coast" appearance. In the 1985-86 school year, the school was used for commercials for Ralston Purina, the California State Lottery, the Church of Jesus Christ of Latter-day Saints, Burger King, National Education Association, and Kleenex. Over that time, Dorris Place received $4,400 from filmmakers. The money was used to buy computers, software, and basketball uniforms. The school's facade has appeared in Cold Case, Freaky Friday, Unlawful Entry, and Lucifer.
