= 516 South Anderson Street =

Historic industrial building and filming location in Los Angeles

- Los Angeles & Santa Fe Railroad Locomotive Repair Building
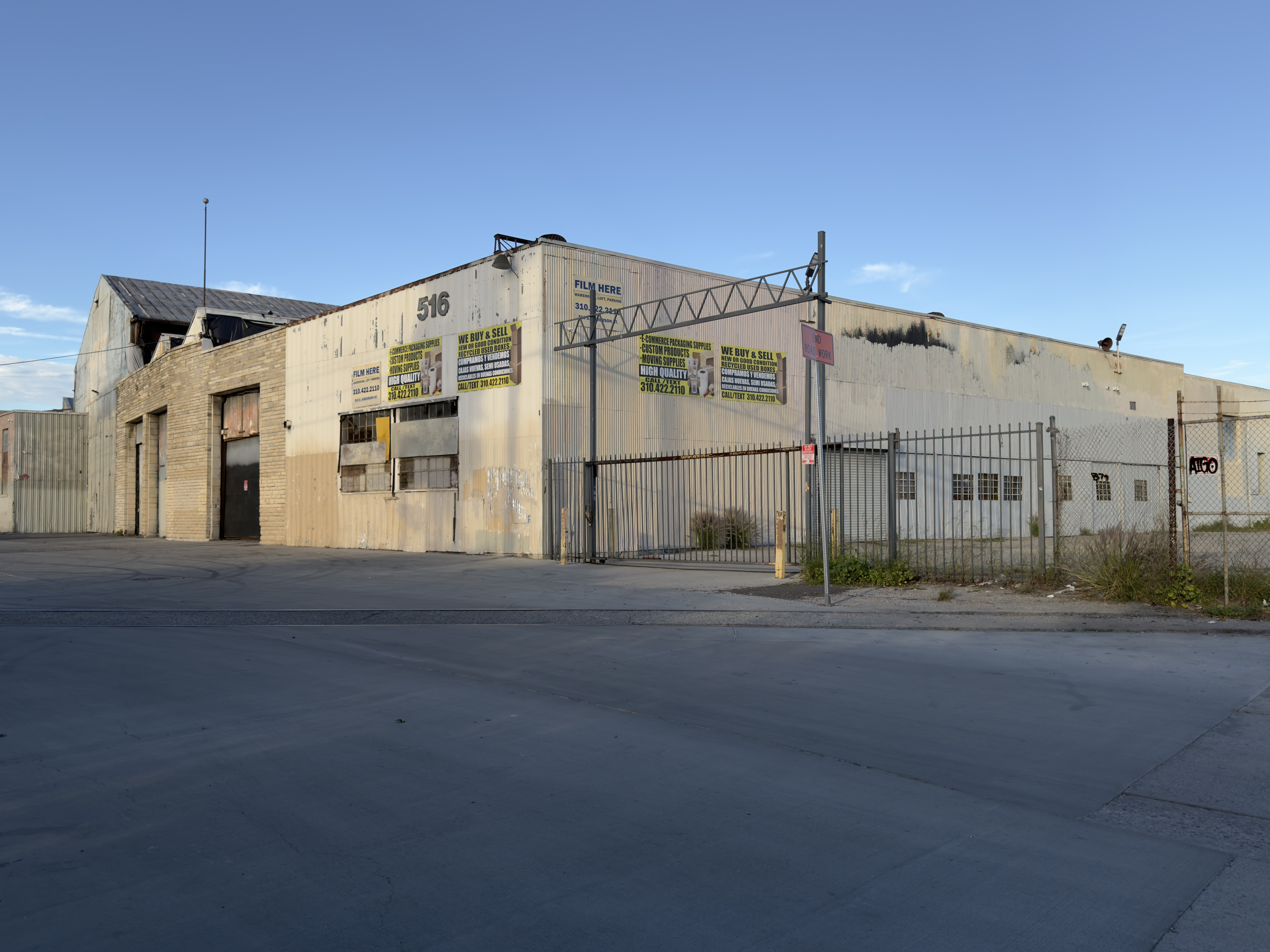
- The building exterior at 516 South Anderson Street, photographed on January 18, 2026.
- Alternative names: Los Angeles & Salt Lake Locomotive Repair Building; The Lucha Underground Temple; SCS Warehouse

General information
- Location: 516 S. Anderson Street, Boyle Heights, Los Angeles, California 90033, United States
- Coordinates: 34.0405°N 118.2242°W
- Current tenants: Commercial filming and event space
- Completed: 1917
- Owner: Private commercial trust

The Los Angeles & Santa Fe Railroad Locomotive Repair Building (commonly known by its address 516 South Anderson Street, and historically tied to the Salt Lake Route) is a historic industrial building in the Boyle Heights neighborhood of Los Angeles, California, United States. Constructed in 1917 for the San Pedro, Los Angeles & Salt Lake Railroad, it is one of the last surviving early‑20th‑century locomotive repair facilities in the region and retains original industrial features including embedded shop tracks, timber trusses, and a concrete arrowhead emblem on its east facade. Historians note that the "Santa Fe" reference in municipal surveys is likely a clerical error on official archival paperwork, and the facility would have historically operated as the Los Angeles & Salt Lake Locomotive Repair Building.

After its acquisition by a private commercial trust in 1998, the building transitioned from industrial use to a dedicated filming and event facility. Its large open floor plan, elevated catwalks, and heavy‑duty structural framing made it suitable for major productions, beginning with Fox's 1998 television specials Breaking the Magician's Code: Magic's Biggest Secrets Finally Revealed. The property has since been used for a wide range of film and television projects, including 24, Inception, Agents of S.H.I.E.L.D., The Colony, and the first three seasons of Lucha Underground, where it was presented on‑screen as "The Temple."

Today, 516 South Anderson Street continues to operate as a commercial studio and live event venue. It remains a notable filming location in Los Angeles and is identified by HistoricPlacesLA as potentially eligible for listing in the National Register of Historic Places, the California Register of Historical Resources, and as a contributor to a local industrial historic district.

== History ==
Western facade of 516 South Anderson Street, showcasing a historical entrance with original rail tracks still embedded flush in the pavement. These structural doors also served as the opening visual for the third special of Breaking the Magician's Code: Magic's Biggest Secrets Finally Revealed (1998), accompanied by host Mitch Pileggi's voiceover introducing the venue: 'We are now entering the warehouse.' Photographed on September 25, 2026.

=== Railroad origins ===
Constructed in 1917, the facility is officially designated in municipal surveys as the Los Angeles & Santa Fe Railroad Locomotive Repair Building, though it was historically built for and operated by the San Pedro, Los Angeles & Salt Lake Railroad. The building served as a heavy locomotive repair shop and still retains an original concrete Salt Lake Route arrowhead logo near the apex of its east facade. After Union Pacific's acquisition of the line in 1921, the site utilized a network of rail spurs extending west from the main line for industrial access. The 54,711-square-foot (5,082.8 m^{2}) brick-and-timber structure is identified as the only remaining early-20th-century locomotive repair shop in Boyle Heights and contributes to the potential 500–600 South Anderson Street Industrial District.

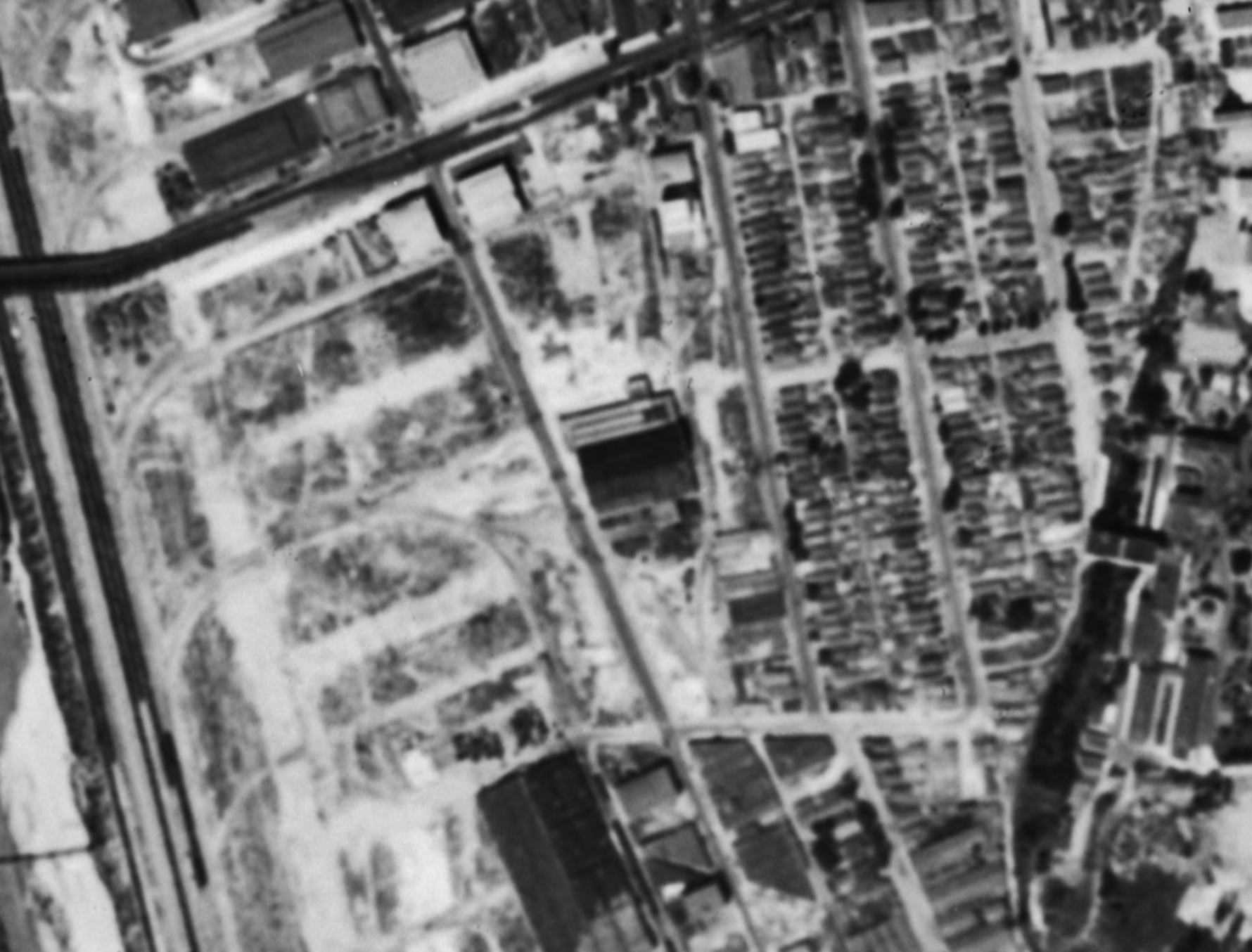
A 1928 aerial view showing the facility (center) with distinct railroad spurs sweeping off the main mainline directly into the building's western facade, confirming its original design as an active locomotive repair shop.

=== Locomotive maintenance (1917–1950s) ===
Designed as a fully equipped heavy repair facility, the building housed interior rail spurs, embedded shop tracks, and specialized equipment for servicing the Salt Lake Route's locomotive fleet. Its two-story industrial layout supported major mechanical work, including boiler servicing, wheel and axle repairs, and structural maintenance of locomotive frames and tender cars. The shop's concrete-floor rail alignments, still visible today, were used to move engines through different repair stations and accommodate early 20th-century maintenance practices.

Top-down aerial photography captured on May 31, 1956, confirms that the building's specialized rail infrastructure remained active into the late 1950s, visibly capturing a locomotive utilizing the curved spur tracks directly entering the western facade.

=== Transition to studio and media production (1997–present) ===
Following decades of industrial use, the property was purchased by a private commercial real estate trust on October 14, 1998, for conversion into a media production facility. Before its adaptation for filming, the building housed industrial apparel and logistics tenants, including Style Clothing Supply, Inc. and Packaging & Display USA (SCS), which operated across 510 and 516 South Anderson Street. This association contributed to the building's later nickname, the "SCS Warehouse." The property was quickly adopted by location scouts due to its large interior volume, unreinforced masonry, and high clearance.

==== Breaking the Magician's Code era (1997, 1998, 2008) ====
The facility's first major production occurred in late 1997 and continued into 1998, serving as the primary set for Fox's television specials Breaking the Magician's Code: Magic's Biggest Secrets Finally Revealed. Its intact industrial infrastructure provided practical utility for film crews. Original overhead catwalks and crane support systems functioned as built‑in platforms for lighting, rigging, and camera work, reducing the need for temporary scaffolding. The exterior facade occasionally retained scenic elements created for productions, including a painted advertisement reading "Apex Fuel Supply Co." which can be seen in the Levitating from the Warehouse Roof to the Ground illusion from episode 3 of the 2008 series.

Nash Entertainment used the building's interior as the setting for the series. Performer Val Valentino, appearing as the "Masked Magician," used the warehouse floor plan to demonstrate and reveal the mechanics behind large‑scale stage illusions. The building's elevated catwalks and open timber framing allowed camera crews to capture high‑angle views of illusion apparatuses, including escape doors, false floors, and mirror systems.

Although the series presents the location as a single "secret warehouse," the exterior shown in the 1998 opening credits is not 516 South Anderson Street. The establishing shot features the former Van de Kamp Bakery Building in Glassell Park, a Dutch Revival industrial landmark frequently used in Los Angeles filming. Once the camera transitions inside, however, all interior sequences were filmed at 516 South Anderson Street. The two buildings are approximately 4.5 miles apart, with the Van de Kamp building used for the exterior establishing shot and three large outdoor illusions from the 1998 specials including, Vanishing Tank (episode 3), Buried Alive (episode 4), and Death Trap (episode 4), while 516 South Anderson Street provided the interior setting.

For the 2008 MyNetworkTV revival, several illusions were staged in exterior areas of 516 South Anderson Street, including "Levitating from the Warehouse Roof to the Ground" (episode 3), "Passing Car Registration Through Car Windshield" (episode 4), and "Surviving Being Cut Up in a Wood Chipper" (episode 5).

==== Colony era (2009) ====
In early 2009, the warehouse served as the primary setting and production base for the first season of the Discovery Channel series The Colony. Ten participants were housed inside the facility for 21 days to simulate post-apocalyptic survival and community reconstruction. The building's weathered masonry, deteriorated windows, and industrial condition provided the required visual aesthetic without major modification.

Production crews added scenic distressing to the exterior, including a painted advertisement reading "Apex Fuel Supply Co." Participants used interior spaces and available scrap materials to construct improvised infrastructure such as water filtration systems, small solar arrays, and security barriers.

==== Lucha Underground Temple era (2014–2017) ====
Between 2014 and 2017, the facility served as the primary arena and production headquarters for the first three seasons of Lucha Underground, where it was branded on-screen as "The Temple." Produced by Mark Burnett and Robert Rodriguez, the series combined lucha libre wrestling with scripted cinematic vignettes.

Audience seating was installed in multi-tiered bleachers positioned against the brick walls surrounding the ring. Because the original timber trusses could not support broadcast lighting, crews constructed a free-standing steel rigging structure over the ring. An auxiliary office was converted into the set for the character Dario Cueto (portrayed by Luis Fernández-Gil). The industrial catwalks were incorporated into action sequences, with performers occasionally using the railings during staged stunts. Additional backstage scenes were filmed in the building's locker rooms, stairwells, and exterior alleys. Production relocated for the fourth season in 2018 to a warehouse on Industrial Street known as "The Ice Temple."

== Filming and live events ==
Year	Title	Type	Production Company	Network / Distributor	Details / Role
1997, 1998, 2008	Breaking the Magician's Code	TV Special	Nash Entertainment	Fox / MyNetworkTV	Main filming warehouse where the "Masked Magician" performed and exposed illusions. For the 2008 series, three illusions were filmed outside: Levitating from the Warehouse Roof to the Ground (episode 3), Passing Car Registration Through Car Windshield (episode 4), and Surviving Being Cut Up in a Wood Chipper (episode 5).
2007	24	TV Series	20th Century Fox Television	Fox	Featured in Season 6 as an industrial warehouse safehouse utilized by the antagonist Abu Fayed.
2009	The Colony	TV Series	Discovery Studios / Original Productions	Discovery Channel	Primary setting for Season 1. Ten contestants were isolated inside to simulate post-collapse survival.
2010	Inception	Film	Syncopy / Legendary Pictures	Warner Bros. Pictures	Used as the main safehouse interior where Cobb (Leonardo DiCaprio) explains the rules of "limbo" to the team.
2013	Robot Combat League	TV Series	Smart Dog Media	Syfy	Served as the main arena and studio for the hydraulic robot fighting tournament.
2014	Agents of S.H.I.E.L.D.	TV Series	ABC Studios / Marvel Television	ABC	Featured in Season 1 as a Cuban warehouse, and later in Season 3 as Grant Ward's Hydra base.
2014–2017	Lucha Underground	TV Series	United Artists Media Group / MGM Television	El Rey Network	Extensively modified into "The Temple", the primary wrestling arena and set for the first three seasons of the show.
2016	New Girl	TV Series	20th Century Fox Television	Fox	Utilized as an interior warehouse filming location during Season 5.
2017	Show Me the Money 6	TV Series	CJ ENM / Mnet	Mnet	Hosted the Los Angeles audition rounds for the South Korean rap survival competition series.
2020	Birds of Prey	Film	DC Films / LuckyChap Entertainment / Warner Bros.	Warner Bros. Pictures	Exterior courtyard and street perimeter transformed to portray the entrance of the ACE Chemical Plant and the "Booby Trap".
2023	정국 (Jung Kook), USHER ‘Standing Next to You - USHER Remix’	Performance Video	BIGHIT MUSIC	YouTube / HYBE	Official performance music video filmed on-site at the facility.

== Location ==
516 South Anderson Street is located in the eastern portion of the Boyle Heights neighborhood of Los Angeles, within a long‑established industrial corridor adjacent to the Los Angeles River. The property sits approximately 2 miles (3.2 km) east of Downtown Los Angeles and occupies a parcel within the 500–600 South Anderson Street Industrial District, a grouping of early‑20th‑century brick and timber industrial buildings historically served by the Salt Lake Route and later the Union Pacific Railroad.

The surrounding area is characterized by large warehouse structures, rail‑served lots, and heavy industrial zoning that has supported manufacturing, logistics, and later film production. The building lies near major transportation routes including the Santa Monica Freeway (I‑10), Mission Road, and the 6th Street Viaduct, providing convenient access for production vehicles and equipment.

The former Van de Kamp Bakery building in Glassell Park, located approximately 4.5 miles north of 516 South Anderson Street, has occasionally been associated with the site due to its use as an exterior establishing shot in the 1998 opening credits of Breaking the Magician's Code. Despite this visual connection, all interior filming for the series occurred at 516 South Anderson Street.

== Architecture ==
Eastern facade of 516 South Anderson Street, showcasing the surviving concrete arrowhead logo belonging to the Salt Lake Route. Photographed on September 25, 2026.

The building is a prominent example of early-20th-century utilitarian railroad architecture, constructed in 1917 using a heavy concrete and steel frame beneath a two-story gabled roof. The layout was specifically designed to accommodate large-scale locomotive servicing, featuring a sprawling footprint with a multi-level main hall.

While the primary western facade was later altered covering the originally open elevation where locomotives entered with corrugated metal—the eastern elevation retains a high level of historical integrity. This eastern facade prominently features a surviving concrete arrowhead logo belonging to the Salt Lake Route, confirming Sanborn map evidence of the building's original rail operations.

== Preservation status ==
The property is recognized by HistoricPlacesLA as an architecturally distinctive example of industrial development in Boyle Heights tied to regional transportation improvements between 1913 and 1945. Survey evaluations have designated the structure with multiple historic registry eligibility rankings:

- National Register of Historic Places (Status Code 3B): Eligible for individual listing as a key example of railroad architecture in Los Angeles, as well as a contributing structure to the potential 500–600 South Anderson Street Industrial District under Criteria A and C.
- California Register of Historical Resources (Status Code 3CB): Eligible for individual listing and as a contributor to a state-eligible historic district under Criteria 1 and 3.
- Municipal Designation (Status Code 5B): Eligible for local designation as a district contributor and as an individual City of Los Angeles Historic-Cultural Monument.

== See also ==
- San Pedro, Los Angeles and Salt Lake Railroad
- Arts District, Los Angeles
- Los Angeles River
- Van de Kamp Bakery Building
- Industrial architecture
