= Glassell Park, Los Angeles =

Glassell Park
- Neighborhood of Los Angeles
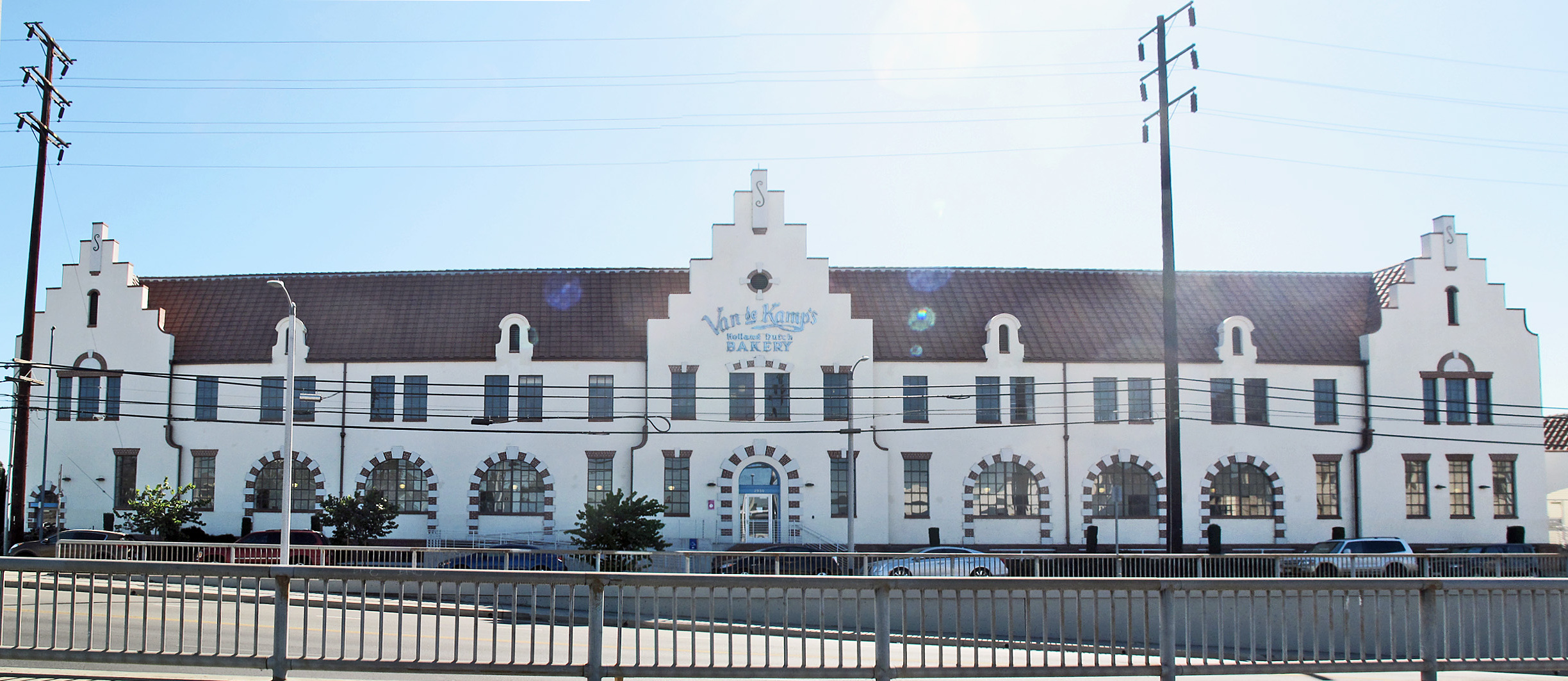
- Van de Kamp Building

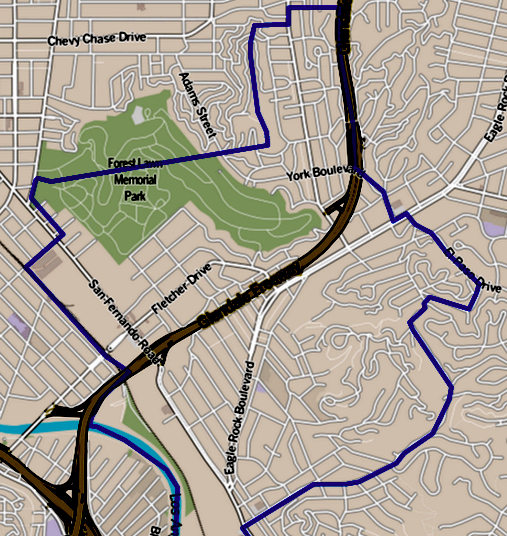
- Glassell Park, as delineated by the Los Angeles Times

- Location within Northeast Los Angeles
- Coordinates: 34.116944°N 118.233056°W
- Country: United States
- State: California
- County: Los Angeles
- City: Los Angeles
- Named for: Real estate attorney Andrew Glassell

Government
  - U.S. House: Jimmy Gomez (D)

Area
  - Total: 2.75 sq mi (7.1 km^{2})
- Elevation: 433 ft (132 m)

Population (2021)
  - Total: 22,911
- Time zone: UTC-8 (PST)
  - Summer (DST): UTC-7 (PDT)
- Zip codes: 90065
- Area codes: 213, 323

Glassell Park is a neighborhood of Northeast Los Angeles, California, United States, in the Repetto Hills.

== Population ==
The 2000 U.S. Census counted 23,469 residents in the 2.75-square-mile Glassell Park neighborhood—or 8,524 people per square mile, an average population density for the city. In 2021, the city estimated that the population was 22,911. The median age for residents was 30, about average for the city and county.

The neighborhood was considered "moderately diverse" ethnically, with a high percentage of Asians and Latinos. As of the early 2000s, the breakdown was 66.1% Latino; 13.7% white; 17.4% Asian; 1.4% black; and 1.4% other. Based on 2021 US Census estimates, the neighborhood was 52.7% Latino; 24.3% white; 17.8% Asian; and 1.9% black. Mexico (49.3%) and the Philippines (16.2%) were the most common places of birth for the 51.5% of residents who were born abroad, a relatively high percentage compared to the city as a whole.

Like its ethnic composition, Glassell Park is inhabited by a wide variety of socioeconomic groups and is experiencing significant demographic change and economic development. The median yearly household income in 2008 dollars was $50,098, an average figure for Los Angeles. The percentage of households that earned $20,000 to $40,000 yearly was high for Los Angeles County. The average household size of 3.3 people was high for Los Angeles. Renters occupied 56.2% of the housing stock and house- or apartment owners held 43.8%.

== Geography ==
According to the Mapping L.A. project of the Los Angeles Times, Glassell Park is bordered on the north by Glendale, on the northeast and east by Eagle Rock, on the southeast by Mount Washington, on the south and southwest by Elysian Valley and on the west by Atwater Village.

The neighborhood is located in a relatively hilly region of the Repetto Hills. Due to its hilly geography, many Glassell Park homes are built on hillsides with views of the surrounding area. Like many hillside areas in Southern California, the LAFD imposes parking restrictions on certain streets during high-fire-danger "red flag" days.

In early 2013, a local artist installed large letters spelling "Glassellland" in the vacant hills above the Glassell Park Recreation Center. The name "Glassellland" is a reference to "Hollywoodland"—a real estate development whose promotional sign still stands as the famous Hollywood Sign.

== History ==
The land that would later become Glassell Park was originally part of Rancho San Rafael, granted in 1784 to Spanish army corporal José María Verdugo. Attorney Andrew Glassell received part of Rancho San Rafael from the lawsuit known as the Great Partition of 1871. Glassell eventually settled in the area with his family, for whom many streets, including Toland Way, Drew St, Andrita and Marguarite Streets are named.

The development of Glassell Park began in the early 20th century, as subdivisions between Verdugo and San Fernando Roads began to be sold in 1907. In 1912, the city of Los Angeles annexed most of Glassell Park, annexing the remainder in 1916. The Glassell family continued to subdivide their land, selling off what is now Forest Lawn Memorial Park in 1905. The growing neighborhood was served by a line of the Los Angeles Railway, which traveled in the median of Eagle Rock Boulevard towards Eagle Rock.

The Van de Kamp Bakery Building, built in 1930, is a designated Los Angeles Historic-Cultural Monument.

Glassell Park suffered periods of gang activity in the final decades of the 20th century due to the arrival of the Mexican-American Avenues. In 2008 and 2009, the police launched a major raid against The Avenues stronghold at 3304 Drew St. and demolished its former neighborhood stronghold, replacing it with the Glassell Park Community Garden. The Glassell Park Community Garden is now a focal point of community life in the area and regularly hosts neighborhood events.

Today, Glassell Park is experiencing significant and steady demographic shifts due to its abundant craftsmen and hillside homes, and convenient location close to Downtown Los Angeles, Silver Lake, and Highland Park. Glassell Park's median home price is increasing at a rapid pace, significantly exceeding that of Los Angeles County. In 2016, the median home price in Los Angeles County rose by about 7 percent; in that same period, the median home price in Glassell Park rose 25.3 percent.

Glassell Park stands to benefit greatly from the city's $1.6-billion Los Angeles River revitalization project. The project will restore habitat, widen the river, create wetlands and provide access points and bike trails along an 11-mile stretch of the Los Angeles River that runs from downtown Los Angeles through Glassell Park.

In 2025, the "Cazador Castle", a 1928 Spanish-style estate by architect Robert D. Jones, sold for $3.5 million, setting a record as the neighborhood's most expensive single-family home.

== Government ==
Districts that represent Glassell Park, in part or completely currently are:

- Los Angeles City Council District 1 — Councilmember Eunisses Hernandez
- Los Angeles City Council District 13 — Councilmember Hugo Soto-Martinez
- Los Angeles County Board of Supervisors, District 1 — Supervisor Hilda L. Solis
- California State Assembly District 52 — Assemblymember Wendy Carrillo
- California State Senate District 26 — State Senator María Elena Durazo
- U.S. Congressional District 34 — U.S. Representative Jimmy Gomez

== Education ==
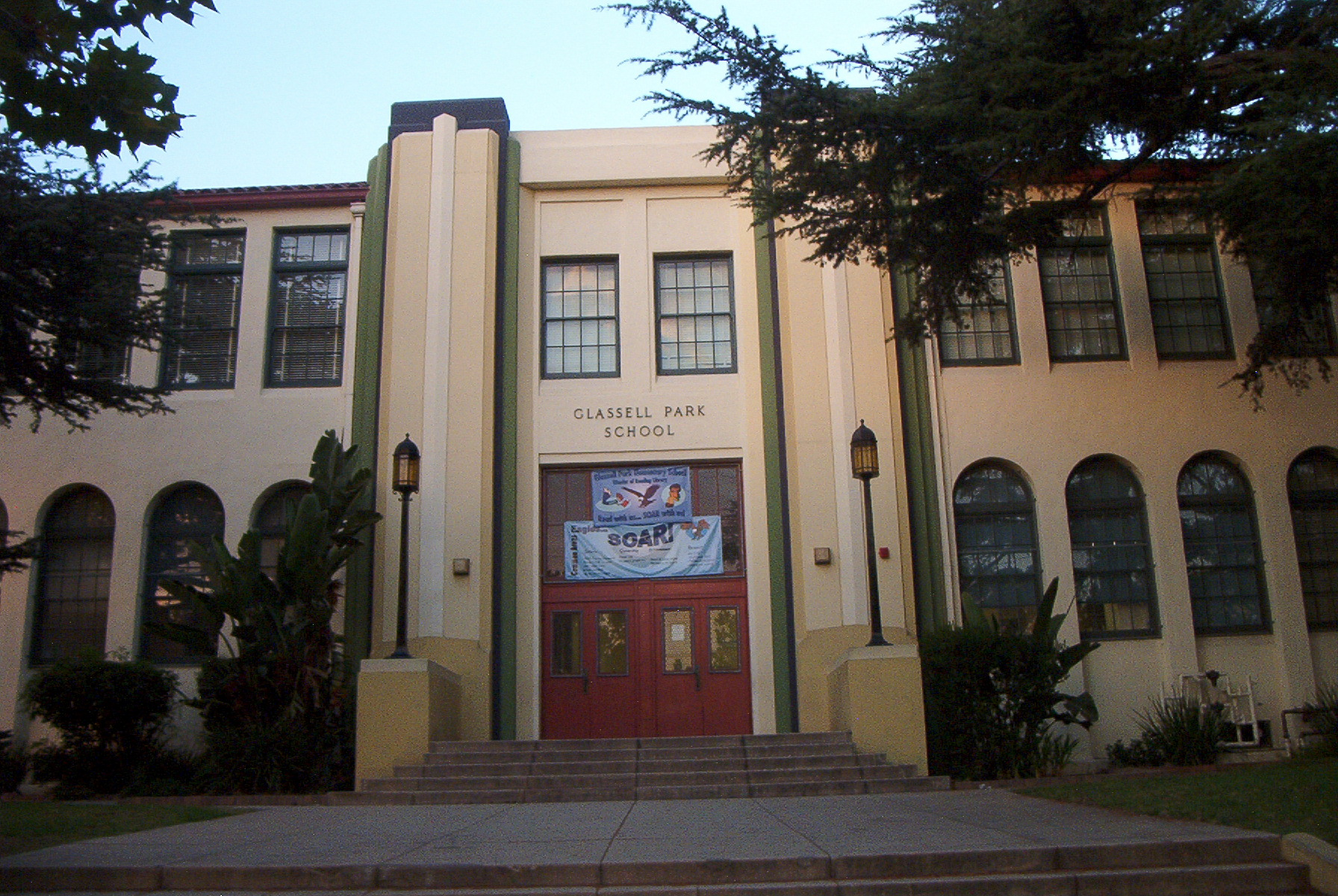
NRHP listed Glassell Park Elementary School.

Nineteen percent of Glassell Park residents aged 25 and older had earned a four-year degree by 2000, an average figure for both the city and the county.

Schools in Glassell Park are:

- California Creative Learning Academy, LAUSD Charter, 2709 Media Center Drive
- Fletcher Drive Elementary School, LAUSD, 3350 Fletcher Drive
- Glassell Park Elementary School, LAUSD, 2211 West Avenue 30, listed on the National Register of Historic Places
- Irving STEAM Magnet School, LAUSD, 3010 Estara Avenue
- ISANA Octavia Academy, LAUSD Charter, 2911 N. San Fernando Road
- Sotomayor Arts and Science Magnet, LAUSD, 2050 N. San Fernando Road
- Alliance Leichtman-Levine Environmental Science High School, Charter School, 2930 Fletcher Drive
- St. Bernard School, Private Catholic School, 3254 Verdugo Road
- Renaissance Arts Academy, LAUSD Charter, 2558 N. San Fernando Road

== Entertainment industry ties ==
The neighborhood's Super A Foods (2925 Division Street) was a filming location for A Star is Born (2018) and Once Upon a Time in Hollywood (2019).

Glassell Park is home to numerous recording studios including Kingsize SoundLabs, The Ship, Mant Sounds, The Cave, Balboa Recording Studios and Verdugo Sound.

== Recreation ==
The Glassell Park Recreation Center is near the center of Glassell Park, on Verdugo Road. The Rio de Los Angeles State Park is along San Fernando Road and adjacent to the Los Angeles River. It is on part of the former Taylor Yard, a railway switching facility in Glassell Park and Cypress Park.

== Notable people ==
- Edward L. Thrasher, builder, contractor and decorator who served on the Los Angeles City Council between 1931 and 1942.
- John Cage, composer, lived in Glassell Park between 1925 and 1931
- Mitch O'Farrell, former Los Angeles City Council President
- Fritz Haeg, artist, author, "Edible Estates: Attack on the Front Lawn"
- Grace Helbig, YouTuber and actress
- Katherine Kelly Lang, actress, The Bold and the Beautiful
- Arc Iris, indie rock band
- Reno Wilson, actor
- Olga Koumoundouros, artist
