= Minh Thai =

Vietnamese-American speedcuber

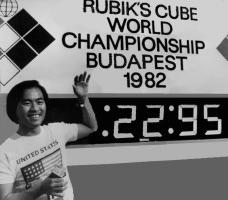
- Thai standing next to the timer after setting his 22.95 world record single
- Born: 1965 (age 60–61); Vietnam
- Years active: 1982
- Known for: Rubik's Cube speedsolver
Medal record
Representing United States
Speedcubing
WCA World Championship
Event	1st	2nd	3rd
3×3×3	1	0	0
Total	1	0	0
Gold medal – first place	World Rubik's Cube Championship 1982	3x3x3

Minh Thai (born 1965 as Thái Minh) is a Vietnamese-American speedcuber. As a sixteen-year-old Eagle Rock High School student from Los Angeles, he won the first Rubik's Cube world championship on June 5, 1982, in Budapest by solving a Rubik's Cube in 22.95 seconds. He is also the author of the book The Winning Solution (1982), a guide to solving the Rubik's Cube. Later, the Ortega Corners-First Solution Method was developed based on Thai's Winning Solution.

== Solving method ==
Thai's solution was based on The Ideal Solution, published in 1980 by the Ideal Toy Company. It involves solving the top, bottom, and middle layers, in that order.

== World records ==
Event	Type	First World Record	Latest World Record	Total
3×3×3	Single	22.95s World Rubik's Cube Championship 1982; 5 June	22.95s World Rubik's Cube Championship 1982; 5 June	1

== See also ==
- Jeff Varasano, unofficial Rubik's Cube United States record holder in 1981
