= James Corrigan (runner) =

American athlete (born 2002)

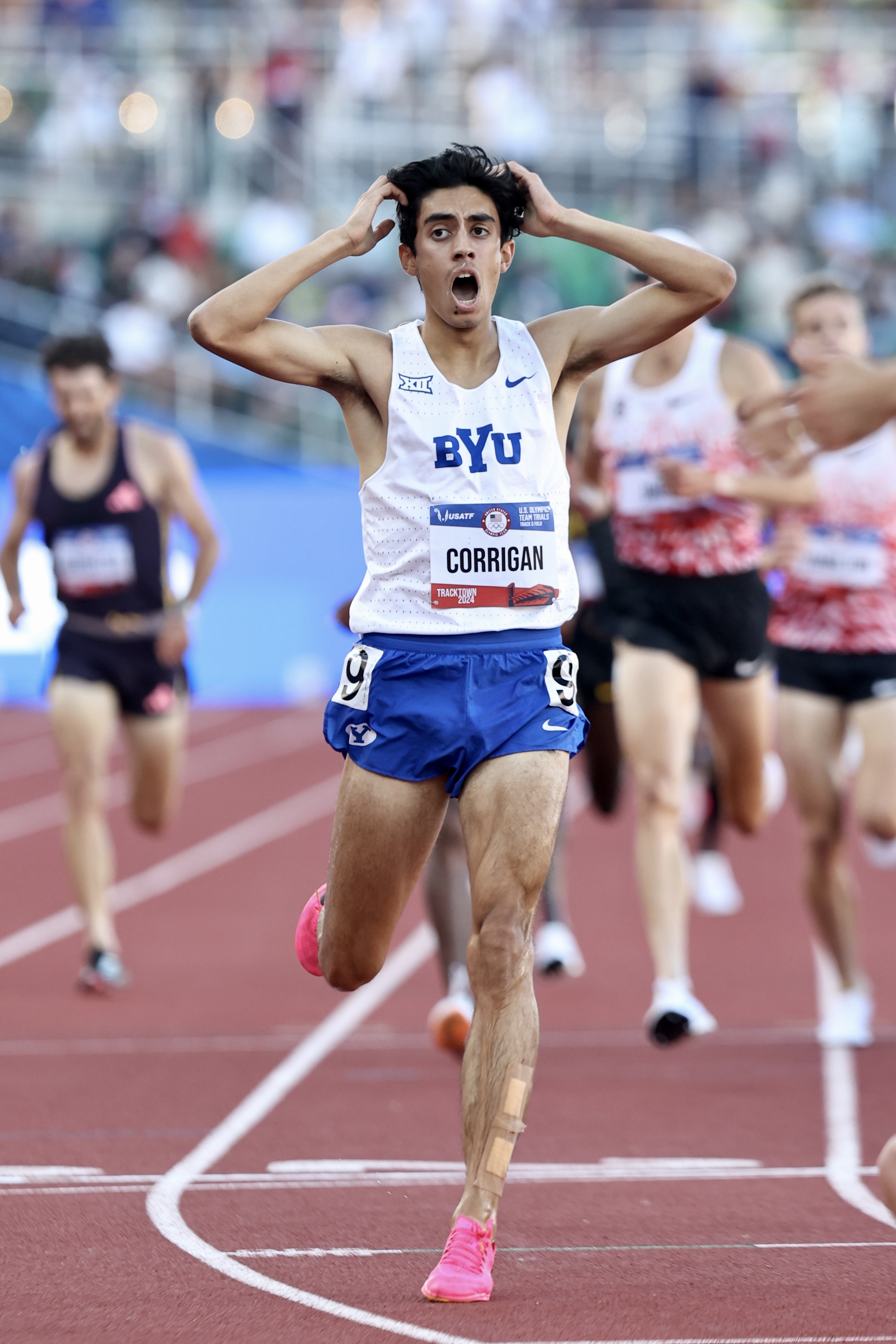
- Corrigan after finishing 3rd in the steeplechase at the 2024 US Olympic trials

Personal information
- Nationality: American
- Born: April 16, 2002 (age 24)
- Spouse: Ashley Corrigan

Sport
- Sport: Athletics
- Event: 3000m steeplechase

Achievements and titles
- Personal bests: 3000m s'chase: 8:13.87 (Philadelphia, 2024)

James Corrigan (born April 16, 2002) is an American runner. He finished third at the 2024 United States Olympic trials in the 3000m steeplechase and competed at the 2024 Olympic Games. He won the 3000m steeplechase at the 2025 NCAA Outdoor Championships.

== Early life ==
Corrigan attended Eagle Rock High School in Los Angeles, California. He was keen on swimming as well as running, before committing to athletics. He attends Brigham Young University.

== Career ==
He won the 3000 metres steeplechase in 8:29.24 at the Big 12 Outdoor Championships in May 2024. He ran 8:28.84 to qualify for the final of the NCAA Division 1 Outdoors Championship in Eugene, Oregon. He finished in ninth place in the final.

He ran a seven-second personal best to qualify for the final of the 3000m steeplechase at the 2024 United States Olympic trials in Eugene, Oregon in June 2024. He finished third in the final at the trials, but without making the minimum standard required to compete at the Paris Olympics.

That week, the day prior to cutoff, he raced at the Penn Relays Summer Showcase in Philadelphia. He ran a time of 8:13.87 on June 29, 2024, to meet the minimum standard for the 2024 Paris Olympics. He competed at the 2024 Summer Olympics in Paris in the 3000 metres steeplechase, placing tenth in his heat in a time of 8:36.67.

In October 2024, Corrigan signed an NIL deal with Nike. He continued to run cross country for BYU in late 2024. He set a meet record to win the steeplechase and the 5000 metres at the Big 12 Conference finals in May 2025. In June 2025, he also won the 2025 NCAA Outdoor Championships 3000 metres steeplechase title in Eugene, Oregon in a time of 8:16.41.
