= Mike Carter (basketball) =

American-Israeli basketball player (1955–2026)

Mike Carter מייק קרטר

Personal information
- Born: July 20, 1955 Eagle Rock, California, U.S.
- Died: November 7, 2026 (aged 71)
- Listed height: 6 ft 8 in (2.03 m)

Career information
- High school: Eagle Rock (Los Angeles, California)
- College: Drury (1977–1979)
- Playing career: 1981–1995
- Position: Power forward / center
- Number: 13

Career history
- 1981–1982: Sporting CP
- 1982–1984: Hapoel Holon
- 1984–1985: Ironi Kiryat Gat
- 1987–1988: Elitzur Netanya
- 1988–1989: Hapoel Jerusalem
- 1989–1992: Maccabi Ramat Gan
- 1992–1995: Hapoel Holon

Career highlights
- Portuguese League champion (1982); No. 13 jersey retired by Hapoel Holon (1996); NAIA tournament champion (1979)
Medals
Representing United States
Men's basketball
Maccabiah Games
Gold medal – first place	2013 Jerusalem

Michael Timothy Carter (Hebrew: מייק קרטר; July 20, 1955 – November 7, 2026), nicknamed Jolly and Meshugah, was an American-Israeli basketball player. He played the forward and center positions. He played for 11 seasons in the Israeli Basketball Premier League.

== Biography ==
A native of Eagle Rock, California, the son of Sue Carter (née Rose Niedospal; 1922-2014), Michael Timothy Carter stood 6 ft 8 in (2.03 m) tall.

Carter attended Eagle Rock High School, and played basketball for the school. He then attended Drury University (Physical Education; class of 1979). Carter played for the Drury Panthers, who in 1978–79 were 33–2 and won the National Association of Intercollegiate Athletics national championship as he won the 1979 NAIA men's basketball tournament's Charles Stevenson Hustle Award, and who over his two seasons with the team were 62–6. He holds the school's two-year record in rebounds (480). He was inducted into the Drury Panthers Hall of Fame in 2008.

He played for 11 seasons in the Israeli Basketball Premier League, living in the country for 13 years. He played for Hapoel Holon, Hapoel Kiryat Gat, Maccabi Netanya, Hapoel Jerusalem, and Ramat Gan. Among his high game records were 31 points in the 1982–83 season and 13 rebounds in the 1992–93 season. In 1996, Hapoel Holon retired his jersey.

=== Personal life and death ===
Carter and his Israeli-born wife, Hadar, had two Israeli-born (American-Israeli) sons, Ben and Timothy. Ben plays forward for Hapoel Eilat in the Israeli Basketball Premier League.

In later years, Carter worked security and coached basketball at his son Ben's alma mater, Bishop Gorman High School (Las Vegas, Nevada) for 21 years. At the 2013 Maccabiah Games, Carter was an assistant coach for Team USA.

Carter died from multiple organ failure on November 7, 2026, at the age of 71.
