= Breaking the Magician's Code: Magic's Biggest Secrets Finally Revealed =

American magic-exposure television specials

- Genre: Magic / Reality television
- Presented by: Mitch Pileggi (1997–1998)
- Starring: Val Valentino (Masked Magician)
- Narrated by: Mitch Pileggi (1997–1998; 2008–2009); Mark Thompson (Announcer)
- Theme music composer: Danny Lux
- Country of origin: United States
- Original language: English
- No. of episodes: 19

Production
- Production locations: 516 South Anderson Street, Los Angeles, California
- Production companies: Nash Entertainment; Don Weiner Productions; Alfred Haber Distribution; SRJ Productions

Original release
- Network: Fox (1997–2002); MyNetworkTV (2008–2009)
- Release: November 24, 1997 – February 21, 2009

Breaking the Magician's Code: Magic's Biggest Secrets Finally Revealed is a United States television series of specials and episodes in which the methods behind magic tricks and stage illusions are revealed. The tricks and illusions were filmed inside a warehouse at 516 South Anderson Street in Boyle Heights, Los Angeles, United States with the performances carried out by an anonymous “Masked Magician” described as a world‑class illusionist who remains silent and wears a mask to conceal his identity. He is assisted by female performers and magical stagehands who appear on camera but are not part of his regular stage crew. The Masked Magician in the original 1997–1998 specials was later publicly identified as American illusionist Val Valentino.

The franchise originally consisted of four specials broadcast in 1997–1998, followed by a standalone special, Escape From the Ice, in 2002, which featured a different masked magician. A street‑magic themed spinoff special, Secrets of Street Magic Revealed, aired in 2007 and also used a different performer in the role. The series was revived in 2008–2009 with thirteen new episodes, during which Valentino returned as the Masked Magician.

== Background ==
Valentino was approached by Fox executives while performing in major Las Vegas showroom productions, including Viva Las Vegas and Splash. After initial hesitation due to concerns about backlash from the magic community, he agreed to participate in the series on the condition that only older, traditional illusions would be revealed. He argued that exposing outdated methods would encourage innovation among magicians and renew public interest in the art of illusion.

Born Leonard Montano on June 14, 1956, in East Los Angeles, Valentino began performing magic as a child after receiving his first magic kit at the age of eight. As a teenager, he performed at children’s parties before later establishing himself professionally in Las Vegas.

Fox developed the concept of a masked magician who would perform classic illusions and then reveal the methods behind them. Valentino took on the role after other magicians declined. His identity was revealed in the final episode of the original 1997–1998 run, which led to significant controversy, including blacklisting, threats, and the revocation of his Magic Castle membership.

Following the controversy in the United States, Valentino continued performing internationally and later achieved renewed popularity in Brazil under the name "Mister M", where he performed sold‑out shows and promoted magic education initiatives.

== Cast ==
=== The Masked Magician ===
The first four specials and the 2008–2009 revival series featured Val Valentino as the Masked Magician, performing large-scale illusions and select close-up magic tricks before revealing the secrets behind them. Although additional specials were produced in 2002 and 2007, Valentino did not appear as the Masked Magician in those productions, and the identities of the performers involved in those specific specials remain unconfirmed.

=== Magic assistants ===
In Breaking the Magician's Code: Magic's Biggest Secrets Finally Revealed, magic assistants played a central role in the show's format. Unlike traditional magic shows, where assistants contribute to the narrative and presentation, the assistants in this series served primarily as functional participants in the “reveal” segments. They acted as “living props,” demonstrating the inner workings of the illusions and exposing the mechanics behind the apparatuses.

=== Assistants and Stage Crew ===
- Note: The following tables are based on the official production credits of the series.*

==== Original series (1997–1998) and Frozen in Ice Special (2002) ====
Name	Role	E1	E2	E3	E4	E5
Sybil Azur	Magic Assistant	✓	✓	✓		
Michelle Berube	Magic Assistant	✓	✓	✓	✓	
Denise Holland	Magic Assistant	✓				
Jennifer Keyes	Magic Assistant	✓				
Diane Klimaszewski	Magic Assistant		✓	✓	✓	
Elaine Klimaszewski	Magic Assistant		✓			
Elizabeth Ramos	Magic Assistant		✓	✓		
Marisa Gilliam	Magic Assistant				✓	
Kelly Danielle Jones	Magic Assistant				✓	
Kimmi Bateman	Magic Assistant					✓
Kelly Cooper	Magic Assistant					✓
Noelle Naone	Magic Assistant					✓
Kadee Sweeney	Magic Assistant					✓

==== Revival series (2008–2009) ====
Name	Role	E1	E2	E3	E4	E5	E6	E7	E8	E9	E10	E11	E12	E13
Allie Cohen	Magic Assistant	✓	✓	✓	✓	✓	✓	✓	✓	✓	✓	✓	✓	✓
Lyndsay Haldorson	Magic Assistant	✓	✓	✓	✓	✓	✓	✓	✓	✓	✓	✓	✓	✓
Samantha Faye Lee	Magic Assistant	✓	✓	✓	✓	✓	✓	✓	✓	✓	✓	✓	✓	✓
Lauren Melendez	Magic Assistant	✓	✓	✓	✓	✓	✓	✓	✓	✓	✓	✓	✓	✓
Paige Peterson	Magic Assistant	✓	✓	✓		✓								
Eve Torres	WWE Diva	✓												
Maria Kanellis	WWE Diva	✓												
Sean Breathwaite	Stagehand	✓	✓	✓						✓				
Danny Davalos	Stagehand	✓	✓	✓				✓		✓	✓	✓		
Frank Lacero	Stagehand	✓												
Jeff Manabat	Stagehand	✓												
Bryan Martin	Stagehand	✓	✓	✓				✓		✓	✓	✓		
Shawn Van Der Wilt	Stagehand	✓	✓	✓										
Laz Viciedo	Stagehand	✓												
Robson Vieira	Stagehand	✓												
Sean Flannery	Stagehand			✓	✓				✓	✓	✓	✓		
Vladamir Bermudez	Stagehand			✓	✓									
Jade Ramsey	Stagehand							✓						
Nikita Ramsey	Stagehand							✓						
Russell Glenka	Stagehand								✓					
Brian Setzer	Magician's Double	✓								✓				
Dominic Valentino	Magician's Double							✓						

== Episodes ==
=== Original Specials (1997–1998) ===
The original 1997–1998 specials were filmed primarily inside the warehouse at 516 South Anderson Street in Boyle Heights, Los Angeles. Although the series presents the location as a single “secret warehouse,” the exterior shown in the opening credits is actually the former Van de Kamp Bakery Building in Glassell Park. Once the camera transitions indoors, all interior footage was recorded at 516 South Anderson Street. Three of the larger outdoor illusions for the 1997–1998 specials, including Vanishing Tank, Buried Alive, and Death Trap, were filmed in the rear industrial yard of the Van de Kamp site, creating a visual contrast between the exterior presentation and the true interior filming location.

Episode	Air dates	List of Illusions Revealed
Episode One	November 24, 1997 (US)	Lady to Tiger; Chinese Lantern; Levitation; Exploding Packing Crate; Zig Zag Girl; Chinese Linking Rings; Metamorphosis; Sawing a Woman in Half; Pulling a Rabbit Out of a Hat; Sword Basket; Vanishing Elephant
Episode Two	March 3, 1998 (US)	Crusher; Teleportation; Lady of Steel; Vanishing Scarves; Walking Through a Solid Brick Wall; Suit of Armor; Shooting an Arrow Through a Woman; Switching Places; Disappearing Doves; Box of Pain; Water Torture Escape
Episode Three	May 5, 1998 (US)	Bed of Spikes; The Stretch; Daggers of Death; Disappearing Scarf; The Haunted House; Disappearing Radio; Bullet Catch; Turning Water Into Ice; Mismatch Girl; Vanishing Tank
Episode Four – The Final Reveal	October 29, 1998 (US)	Car Crusher Escape; Cremation; Spike Torture; Guillotine; Buried Alive; Pincushion Thumb; Death Trap; The Cannon and the Crate

=== Escape From the Ice (2002 Special) ===
The 2002 special also features exterior shots of the Van de Kamp Bakery Building, but all interior footage was recorded at 516 South Anderson Street in Boyle Heights, the same warehouse used for the original 1997–1998 specials. This special was not narrated by Mitch Pileggi, but was narrated fully by Mark Thompson and the Masked Magician was portrayed by a different performer whose identity has never been publicly revealed and was not Val Valentino.

Episode	Air dates	List of Illusions Revealed
Episode Five – Escape From the Ice	May 15, 2002 (US)	Sawing Through a Woman with a Buzz Saw; Making an Assistant Disappear; Broom Suspension; Going Through the Portal; Disappearing Dumptruck; Spike Torture Escape; Floating Table; Frozen Alive

=== Secrets of Street Magic Revealed (2007 Special) ===
This special was produced by the same company responsible for the original series, this special was released as a standalone spin-off, titled Secrets of Street Magic Revealed (2007), rather than being branded under the Breaking the Magician’s Code title. Unlike previous installments that focused on grand stage illusions, this production concentrated exclusively on street-magic techniques and close-up performances.

The special featured several departures from the franchise's established format. Mitch Pileggi did not provide the narration, and the role of the Masked Magician was recast with a performer distinct from both Val Valentino and the unidentified magician who appeared in the 2002 special. Additionally, it is the only installment in the franchise in which the Masked Magician speaks on camera, utilizing a voice that appears to have been altered to conceal the performer's identity.

Special	Air date	List of Illusions Revealed
Secrets of Street Magic Revealed	September 2007	Ash in Palm; Vanishing Coin; Riffle Force; Arm Twist; Raising Card; Mind Reading; The Switch; Swami Prediction; Ash Reveal; Dead Fly Resurrection; Time Machine; Telekinesis; Cigarette Through Coin; Dove Decapitation; Street Levitation

=== Series Revival (2008–2009) ===
The 2008–2009 revival did not reuse the Van de Kamp Bakery exterior shot seen in the earlier specials, likely because the warehouse structure behind the landmark had been demolished by that time. Val Valentino returned as the Masked Magician for this series, and the illusions revealed were larger, more elaborate, and more technically complex than those featured in the original 1997–1998 specials. Interior filming once again took place at 516 South Anderson Street in Boyle Heights, while several outdoor illusions were staged at alternate locations throughout the Greater Los Angeles area. For a full list of episodes, illusions revealed, and filming locations used throughout this series, see the List of Breaking the Magician's Code: Magic's Biggest Secrets Finally Revealed episodes page.

Episode	Air dates	List of Illusions Revealed
Episode One	October 2, 2008 (US)	Death Saw; Vanishing Toothpick; Cut and Restore Rope; De Kolta Chair; Coin Through Rubber Sheet; Bentley→Lamborghini Transformation; Floating Soda Can; String Quartet Disappears; Bottle Cap Through Bottle; Passing Through a Steel Wall
Episode Two	October 6, 2008 (US)	Girl Vanish from Table; Rising Card; Floating Table Levitation; Recycle Soda Can; Dismemberment; Spirit Trap; Girl Appears from Clothing; Needle Through Forearm; Elephant Appearance
Episode Three	October 13, 2008 (US)	Guillotine; Penny Through Glass; Girl Appears/Disappears; Cut String in Straw; Houdini Milk Can Escape; Flower from Pan; Dancers Disappear; Chain Through Neck; Roof Levitation
Episode Four	October 20, 2008 (US)	Bomb Squad Car Disappears; Dead Fly Revival; Registration Through Windshield; Assistant’s Revenge; Iron Egg Sawing; Spirit Math; Rose Through Girl; Bite Coin; Passing Through Turbofan
Episode Five	November 3, 2008 (US)	Woman Disappears/Reappears; Zombie Ball; Cigarette Through Half Dollar; Passing Through Metal Plate; Twister; Spoon Bend; Sword Impalement; Ash Through Hand; Wood Chipper Escape
Episode Six	November 10, 2008 (US)	Oil Drum Teleportation; Floating Bill; Topsy‑Turvy; Knife Slice; Slate Writing; Cutting in Three; Coin Through Can; Teleportation
Episode Seven	November 17, 2008 (US)	Table Levitation; Burned Paper to Bill; Crystal Cylinder Appearance; Crayon Prediction; Twilight Zone Door; Disembodied Princess; Phone Through Bottle; Spike Impalement
Episode Eight	November 24, 2008 (US)	Houdini’s Trunk; Thread Restoration; Middle Disappearance; Flaming Thumb; Spirit Pyramid; Light Bulb Crush; Card Catch with Sword; Spinning Blades Escape
Episode Nine	April 20, 2009 (US)	Magic Barrel; Fish Bowl; Card Through Window; Asrah Levitation; Pedestal Appearance; Spoon Bend; 18‑Minute Breath Hold
Episode Ten	April 27, 2009 (US)	Motorbike Vanish; Card Fishing; Balloon Piercing; Upside‑Down Spin; Spirit Room; Foot Levitation; Needle Swallow; Magic Light Bulb; Military Vehicle Appearance
Episode Eleven	May 4, 2009 (US)	Steel Plate Vanish; Card Burn on Skin; Steel Plunger Crush; Vertical Sawing; Drawing Recreation; Skeleton→Dummy→Girl; Shoelace Tie; Steel Frame Levitation; Handkerchief Color Change; Window Penetration
Episode Twelve	May 11, 2009 (US)	Triangle Screen; Coffee Coin Appearance; Bird Boxes; Card Restoration; Tube Through Body; French Guillotine; Burned Paper on Arm; $1→$50 Bill; Trolley Car Levitation
Episode Thirteen	May 18, 2009 (US)	Giant Three‑Card Monte; Upside‑Down Glass; Smoke Woman; Guillotine Hand; Divide Woman in Three; Smash and Stab; Moving Card Holes; Multum in Parvo; Walking on Water

== Production ==
The series is made by production company Nash Entertainment. The title alluded to the magician's code: the promise by working magicians not to reveal the basis of their tricks, or else risk getting blackballed by fellow magicians. The first special, which aired in November 1997, scored the highest ratings for any Fox special to that point; another three specials were broadcast through 1998. Fox returned on May 15, 2002, with Breaking the Magician's Code: Magic's Biggest Secrets Finally Revealed 5. A new magician was wearing a new mask with artificial hair that did not cover their entire face, and a purple glistening outfit. It was never revealed who portrayed the magician in this episode.

MyNetworkTV bought thirteen new episodes for broadcast in the U.S. starting in the fall of 2008, with the first episode shown on October 2. The assistants learned the illusion the same day they shot it and filmed four to six illusions per day. These specials were also shown on TVB Pearl in Hong Kong, with the first episode shown on June 13, 2010. Valentino was credited as a producer and Mitch Pileggi returned as narrator, although he did not appear on camera like the original specials. The show also aired in the UK on ITV4, and in Australia on 7Two with new narration by Grant Denyer.

There is an Australian version of the show that first aired at 7:30 Monday, June 14, 2010, on Network Seven and has changed to Sundays at 6:30 on 7Two. This is the same show as the US version with some minor changes. This show also began to air on Australian pay television network Fox8 on Wednesday September 21, 2011. This version is a duplicate of the American version. Since the first run of the series, the shows have been rerun many times on Sundays on Channel 7. The show also had a Portuguese adaptation in the public TV Channel SIC, essentially a duplicate of the American version only with a different Portuguese narrator.

=== Filming Locations ===
Most warehouse‑based illusions for both the original 1997 series and the 2008 revival were filmed at 516 South Anderson Street in the Boyle Heights neighborhood of Los Angeles, California, United States, which served as the primary production site across both eras. The interior provided functional rigging via its industrial infrastructure, including overhead catwalks, open timber framing, and heavy crane support systems, which allowed camera crews to capture high‑angle overhead views to expose the mechanics behind large‑scale illusions such as false floors, escape doors, and mirror apparatuses.

Although the series presents the setting as a single "secret warehouse," the exterior shown in the 1997/98 opening credits is not 516 South Anderson Street. The establishing shot features the former Van de Kamp Bakery Building in Glassell Park, a Dutch Revival industrial landmark frequently used in Los Angeles filming. Once the camera transitions inside, however, all interior sequences were filmed at 516 South Anderson Street. The two structures are approximately 4.5 miles apart, creating a physical contrast between the exterior presentation and the internal staging environment.

While the warehouse floor served as the core setting, several key segments and outdoor illusions across both eras required alternate locations throughout the Greater Los Angeles area:

Location	Era	Illusions filmed	Details
The Van de Kamp’s Bakery Building	1997 series	• Vanishing Tank (episode 3) • Buried Alive (episode 4) • Death Trap (episode 4)	For the original specials, the opening and closing credits featuring host Mitch Pileggi, alongside several exterior illusions, were captured at the rear warehouse structure of the former Van de Kamp’s Bakery Building. While the main bakery landmark remains, this abandoned rear industrial structure has since been demolished.
516 S. Anderson Street Exterior	2008 series	• Levitating from the Warehouse Roof to the Ground (episode 3) • Passing Car Registration Through Car Windshield (episode 4) • Surviving Being Cut Up in a Wood Chipper (episode 5)	For the 2008 series, three illusions were filmed outside on the immediate grounds and roof of 516 South Anderson Street.
The Rose Bowl Stadium	2008 series	• Making an Elephant Appear in an Empty Parking Lot (episode 2) • Making a 5 Ton Military Vehicle Appear From Nowhere (episode 10)	Large‑scale illusions requiring expansive outdoor footprints were moved offsite to Pasadena.
Pecan Pool	2008 series	• Walking on Water (episode 13)	Another illusion was filmed on location at Pecan Pool, a City of Los Angeles public aquatic facility located nearby at 120 S. Gless Street in Boyle Heights.

== Legal responses and community backlash ==
Criticism was leveled at Valentino by magicians for adversely affecting their acts. Kevin Spencer, a touring magician based in Lynchburg, Virginia who performed with his wife, Cindy, stated that the Fox specials forced the duo to scrap two of their illusions. Spencer stated: "We're disappointed that someone who made his living performing the art of magic for over 25 years would be so quick to betray their community." Since those illusions each cost as much as $50,000 (equivalent to over $96,000 in 2025), the Spencers brought a lawsuit against Valentino, one of several legal actions resulting from the program.

Another lawsuit was brought by magician Andre Kole, who unsuccessfully attempted to prevent Fox from airing a special featuring the secret behind the "Table of Death," an illusion Kole claimed to have perfected. Kole, who had licensed the trick to seven of the top ten magicians in the world, estimated his financial damages at more than $500,000 (equivalent to over $966,000 in 2025). Kole's attorney conceded the inherent difficulty in suing over the loss of a magic trick—since magic secrets are not traditionally protected by copyright law—but noted that "magicians and designers of magic tricks haven't had to take those steps. A handshake has worked for several centuries.

Magician Robert Rice also filed an unsuccessful lawsuit alleging copyright infringement. Rice claimed he had previously developed a similar masked persona called "the Mystery Magician" to reveal the methods of famous illusions, and argued Valentino's performance was based on his work. The presiding judge dismissed the suit, ruling that the performances were not substantially similar and that the basic concept of a masked magic exposure act was not protectable by copyright.

Other performers criticized Valentino's explanations as being sloppy or inaccurate, arguing that he gave a mistaken impression that his exposed methods were regularly used by contemporary professionals. Magician Mark Wilson, host of the 1960s children's television series The Magic Land of Allakazam, publicly stated that several of Valentino's revealed methods were dangerous and not generally utilized by fellow magicians.

=== Perspective of Penn Jillette ===
While the broader magic community criticized Valentino for the act of exposure itself, magician Penn Jillette of the duo Penn & Teller offered a contrasting critique. Penn & Teller have historically integrated the intentional exposure of illusions into their own performances, such as their transparent "Cups and Balls" routine, to celebrate the mechanics and skill of the art form. Consequently, Jillette stated he was not bothered by Valentino revealing secrets, noting that the methods shown on the specials were already widely available to the public in libraries and beginner magic literature.

Instead, Jillette criticized the presentation and format of Breaking the Magician's Code, arguing that framing magic as an adversarial "cheat" being exposed out of spite was artistically lazy. Jillette heavily criticized Valentino's decision to perform anonymously behind a mask to evade professional accountability from his peers while simultaneously attempting to use the secret identity for personal fame. He frequently recounted a real-world encounter at a Las Vegas venue where Valentino privately broke character to boast about being the "Masked Magician" to impress bystanders. Jillette argued that truly successful performers do not hide their faces on television, concluding that Valentino simply lacked the courage to stand behind his work publicly.

=== Broadcast history and International broadcast and distribution ===
The series achieved significant global syndication across several international regions under localized titles. In the United Kingdom, Breaking the Magician's Code was broadcast on the ITV network during the late 1990s and continues to receive occasional repeat airings on ITV4. The series was made available on Netflix in the United States, United Kingdom, Canada, and Australia from June 1, 2016, until its global removal on December 1, 2019.

The program was also popular in Brazil, where segments aired weekly on TV Globo's variety show Fantástico between 1998 and 1999; in this region, the Masked Magician became widely known by the moniker "Mr. M". In Spanish-speaking territories, the series was broadcast throughout Latin America on the A&E cable network under the title Rompiendo la magia. Local terrestrial broadcasts also aired the show under various regional titles, including Detrás de la magia on El Trece in Argentina and Teledoce in Uruguay, Los Secretos del Mago on MEGA in Chile, and Magia sin secretos on Antena 3 in Spain. Additionally, the show was broadcast in Italy on Italia 1 as Sirio, il mago mascherato, and in France on M6.

== Val Valentino ==
Val Valentino
- Born: Leonard Montano; June 14, 1956 (age 70); Los Angeles, California, U.S.
- Other names: Masked Magician, Mr M.
- Occupation: Illusionist
- Television: Breaking the Magician's Code: Magic's Biggest Secrets Finally Revealed
- Children: 3

Val Valentino (born Leonard Montano, June 14, 1956) is an American illusionist primarily known for starring in the television show. In the specials, he used the stage name the Masked Magician and concealed his true identity by wearing a mask with a squid-like kabuki-style design, being aware of the stigma amongst the magic community with publicly exposing tricks. As the finale to the final special, Valentino revealed his identity as the Masked Magician, garnering some notoriety amongst the magic community.

For a span of two years (1997–1999), Valentino performed, unbilled and disguised, as the "Masked Magician" in four Fox Network specials called Breaking the Magician's Code: Magic's Biggest Secrets Finally Revealed which exposed long-guarded secrets.

=== Life and career ===
Valentino's first foray into magic was at the age of five with a trick called "the ball and vase" that his father gave him. In his teens, Valentino performed with the "International Cultural Awareness Program" for over a million students throughout the Unified School Systems. The performances also included revealing magic secrets to encourage others to become magicians.

By the end of the 1980s and into the 1990s, Valentino had moved to Las Vegas, Nevada and was performing in casino shows including Viva Las Vegas and Splash, in addition to having appeared on programs such as The Merv Griffin Show and PM Magazine, as well as in the music video for Herb Alpert's "Magic Man". He also appeared in his own production, "Valentino's Magical Extravaganza".

In October 2017, Valentino announced that he had been diagnosed with terminal prostate cancer, and was given one year to live from the time of the diagnosis. Valentino refused conventional treatment. In June 2020, in an interview with the Brazilian show Domingo Espetacular of Record, he said he was cured and that he is in Brazil preparing a project. Due to the COVID-19 pandemic, he was quarantined in the country, hosted at the Clown Rogério house.
