= Cypress Park, Los Angeles =

Neighborhood of Los Angeles, US

Cypress Park
- Neighborhood
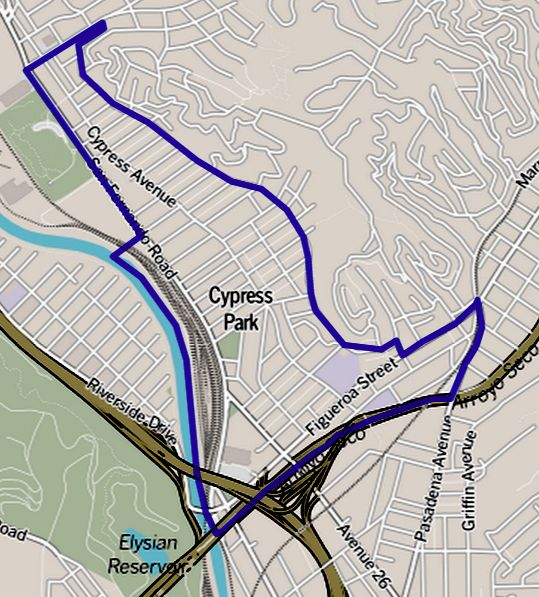
- Boundaries of Cypress Park as drawn by the Los Angeles Times

- Location within Central Los Angeles
- Coordinates: 34.09293°N 118.22504°W
- Country: United States
- State: California
- Municipality: Los Angeles
- Established: 1882

Government
  - City Council: Eunisses Hernandez
  - State Assembly: Jesse Gabriel (D)
  - State Senate: Maria Elena Durazo (D)
  - U.S. House: Jimmy Gomez (D)
- ZIP Code: 90065

Cypress Park is a densely populated neighborhood of 10,000+ residents in Northeast Los Angeles, California. Surrounded by hills on three sides, it sits in the valley created by the Los Angeles River and the Arroyo Seco. It is the site of the Rio de Los Angeles State Park, the Los Angeles River Bike Path and other recreational facilities. It hosts one private and four public schools.

The area was settled as Rancho San Rafael which, after the Mexican–American War, became the property of an American landowner. After his death, Cypress Park was subdivided and established as a community in 1882.

There are four Los Angeles Historic-Cultural Monuments in Cypress Park.

The area is currently undergoing rapid to moderate gentrification due to its close proximity to Highland Park, Downtown and various transportation hubs.

== Population ==
The 2000 U.S. census counted 9,764 residents in the 0.72-square-mile Cypress Park neighborhood—or 13,478 people per square mile, among the highest population densities for the city and the county. In 2008, the city estimated that the population had increased to 10,854. In 2000, the median age for residents was 27, considered young for city and county neighborhoods.

The neighborhood was "not especially diverse" ethnically within Los Angeles, with the number of Latino people considered to be high compared to the city at large—82.1% of the population. Following were Asians, 11.1%; Whites, 4.9%; Blacks, 0.6%; and others, 1.3%. Mexico (73.2%) and China (6.3%) were the most common places of birth for the 52.5% of the residents who were born abroad—which was a high percentage compared to Los Angeles as a whole.

The median yearly household income in 2008 was $42,615, considered average for the city. Renters occupied 58.3% of the housing stock, and house- or apartment-owners held 41.7%. The average household size of 3.7 people was high for Los Angeles. The percentage of never-married females (51.8%) was among the county's highest.

== Geography ==
The neighborhood is situated at the confluence of the Los Angeles River and Arroyo Seco, less than 2.5 miles north of Downtown Los Angeles. It lies within a historic alluvial floodplain shared with the Elysian Valley neighborhood, which is bounded by Elysian Park and Mt. Washington.

== History ==
The land on which Cypress Park currently occupies was first settled by the Tongva tribe of the Shoshone Native Americans. When Gaspar de Portolà and his expedition first encountered the Los Angeles River in August 1769 and described the area of the confluence of the Arroyo Seco as "a very lush green valley". The Pueblo de Los Angeles was later founded adjacent to this location.

The area was granted as Rancho San Rafael to Jose Maria Verdugo in October 1784. In 1859, Julio Verdugo sold the southern tip of the rancho to Jessie D. Hunter, who had first arrived in Los Angeles in 1847 as a captain in the Mormon Battalion during the Mexican–American War. Hunter had previously acquired the Rancho Cañada de los Nogales, which contains most of present-day Glassell Park. Hunter had established the first kiln-fired brickyard in Los Angeles, but sold it and took up farming when he acquired the rancho land.

After Hunter's death the land was subdivided as the Hunter Tract and, in 1882, Cypress Park became the first of the Arroyo Seco communities to come into existence, predating Highland Park by three years.

== Transportation ==
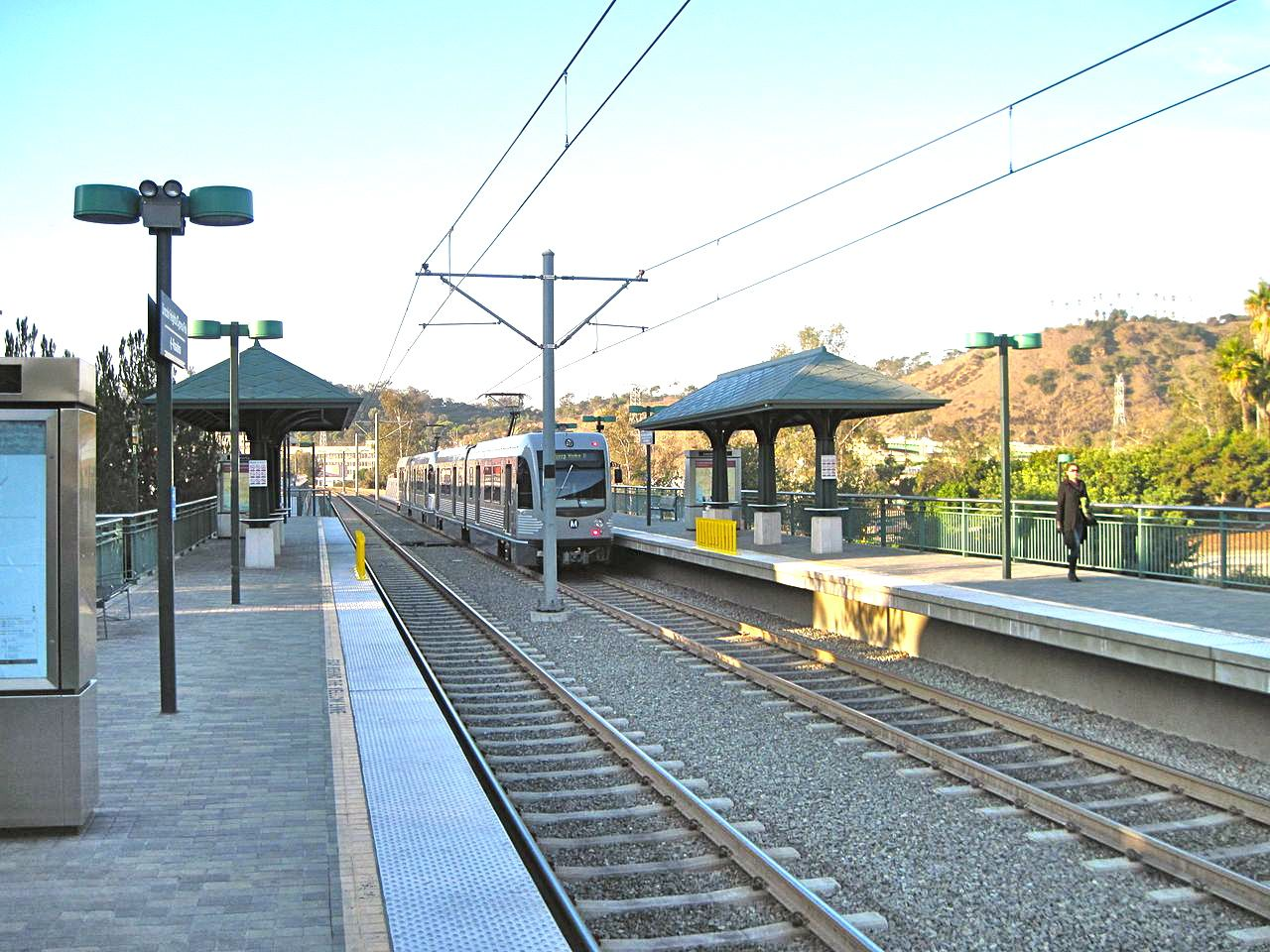
Lincoln/Cypress A Line (formerly Gold Line) station

Cypress Park is served by two metro stations on the A Line (formerly Gold Line), Lincoln/Cypress station located at W. Avenue 26/Lacy St. and Heritage Square station located at French Ave./Marmion Way. It is also served by Metro Local bus lines 81, 90, 94, 182 and 251.

The neighborhood's main thoroughfares are Cypress Ave., San Fernando Rd., and North Figueroa St., and is served by the Golden State Freeway (Interstate 5) and Arroyo Seco Parkway (Highway 110), also known as the Pasadena Freeway.

In addition, Cypress Park has access to the southern end of the LA River Bike Path at the intersection of Figueroa and Interstate 5. The bike path follows the course of the river up to Burbank.

== Parks ==
The neighborhood of Cypress Park sits at the river valley created by the confluence of the Los Angeles River and the Arroyo Seco. As a result, it's surrounded by hills on all sides with Elysian Park to the southwest, Mt Washington to the northeast, and Ernest E. Debs Park at the southeast side. Elysian Park is a city park that includes Dodger Stadium, hiking trails, view points and picnic areas. Ernest Debs Park is a regional park that includes picnic areas, hiking trails and the man-made Peanut Lake at the top of the hill. Mount Washington is a separate neighborhood with residential homes built around its winding hill sides.

The Rio de Los Angeles State Park is one of only two California State Recreation Areas in Los Angeles County. This 40-acre park included restored natural river wetlands, one of the first steps toward revitalization of the Los Angeles River. During the rainy season this part of the park floods, and during spring it becomes a prime location, in the City of Los Angeles, for wildflower viewing. Through a partnership with the City of Los Angeles Department of Parks and Recreation, the park also includes numerous sports fields, a children's playground and a recreation building.

Los Angeles River Center and Gardens is located at the former site of Lawry's California Center. With over 6 acres (2.4 ha) of mission-style buildings and gardens, this complex is operated by the Santa Monica Mountains Conservancy and is host to numerous environmental non-profits, such as: Friends of the Los Angeles River, Northeast Trees, the Los Angeles Conservation Corps, LA Works, and the National Park Service Rivers, Trails and Conservation Assistance Program. The River Center gardens, as well as the adjacent River Garden Park, are open to the public during daylight hours; 570 W. Avenue 26.

Cypress Park Recreation Center, at 2630 Pepper Avenue, is a public park with a baseball field, basketball courts, children's playground, and auditorium.

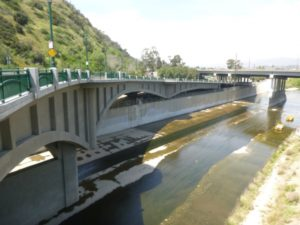
Cypress Park, Los Angeles- LA River Bike Path Entrance

Greayer's Oak Park is a pocket park, named after World War I aviator Greayer Clover, located at the corner of N. Figueroa St. and Marmion Way.

== Education ==
Just 8.4% of Cypress Park residents aged 25 and older had earned a four-year degree by 2000, a low figure for the city and the county. The percentage of residents with less than a high school diploma was high for the county.

Schools within the Cypress Park borders are:

=== Public ===
- Florence Nightingale Middle School, 3311 North Figueroa Street
- Aragon Avenue Elementary School, 1118 Aragon Avenue
- Loreto Street Elementary School, 3408 Arroyo Seco Avenue
- Los Angeles River at Sonia Sotomayor Learning Academies, 2050 N. San Fernando Road

== Landmarks ==
Cypress Park has several historic-cultural monuments.

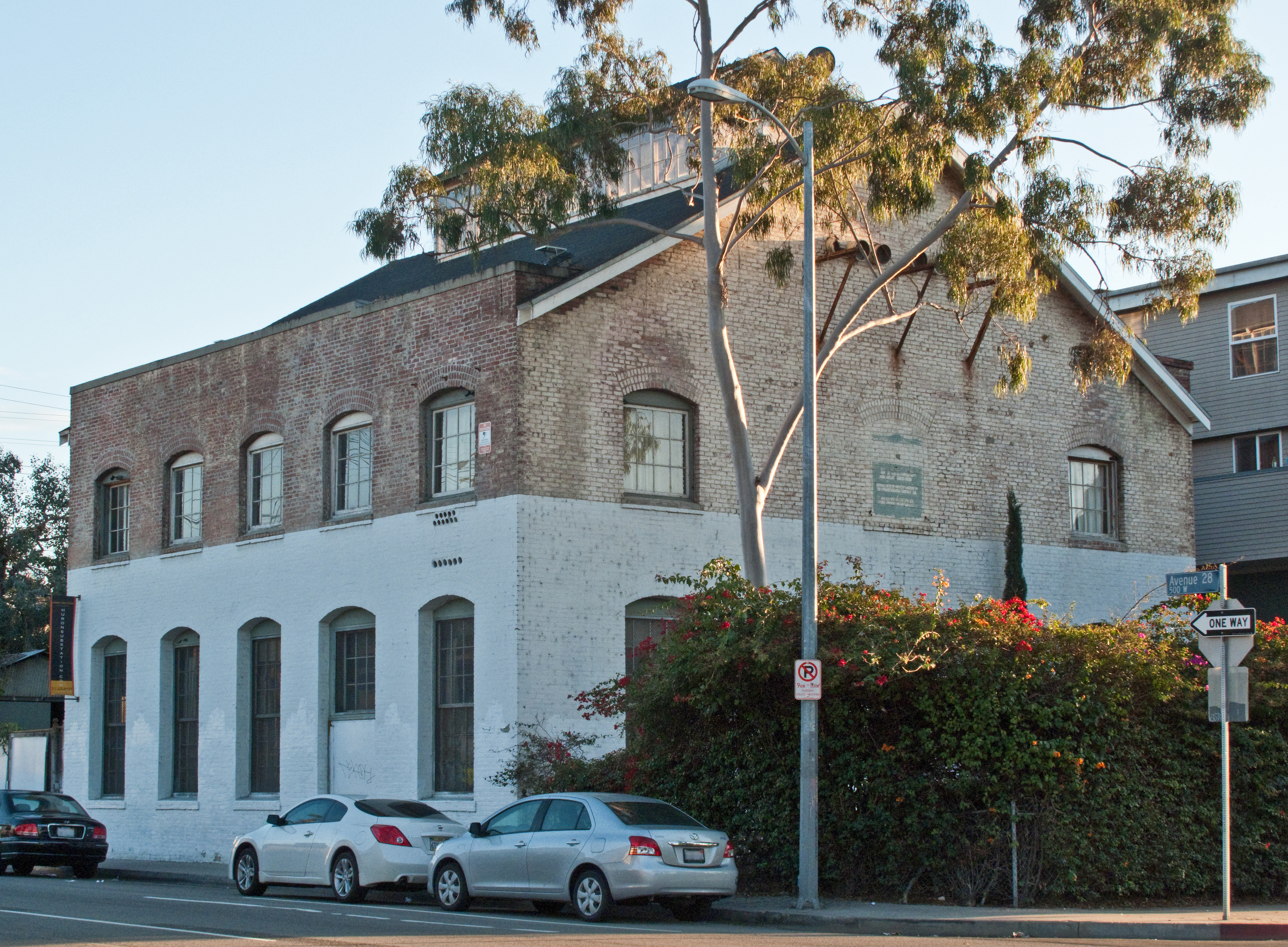
The Huron Substation

These include the Los Angeles Railway Huron Substation (HCM No.404), a Los Angeles Railway traction power substation, built in 1906 and used until 1958 for the Yellow Car system. The Jeffries House (HCM No. 735) was built in 1911 for the brother of James J. Jeffries, boxing heavyweight Champion of the World, and is the last remaining house of this prominent family.

Cypress Park also includes the Nickel-Leong Mansion (HCM No.849), a large Antebellum-style, Greek Revival Mansion at Isabel Street and Thorpe Avenue. This house was built in 1905 for restaurateur Max Nickel and later owned by the Leong family of Chinatown. The house was designed by John C. Austin, a Los Angeles architect, who was one of the designers of Los Angeles City Hall, Griffith Observatory, and the Arroyo Seco Bank Building at Figueroa Street and York Boulevard.

Additionally, the Richard Henry Dana Branch (3320 Pepper Avenue, HCM No.1004), a former branch library of the Los Angeles Public Library, is #47 on the National Register of Historic Places in Los Angeles. The Cypress Park library is now located at 1150 Cypress Ave.

== In the media ==
Cypress Park and businesses within it are frequently used as filming locations in feature films and music videos. The movies The Fast and the Furious, Catwoman, and Date Night as well as the television series Heroes filmed scenes in the Huron Substation. Local bar Footsie's was used for the music video to the song "Live Your Life" by T.I., featuring Rihanna. as well as the movie Bad Santa and the HBO series Barry.

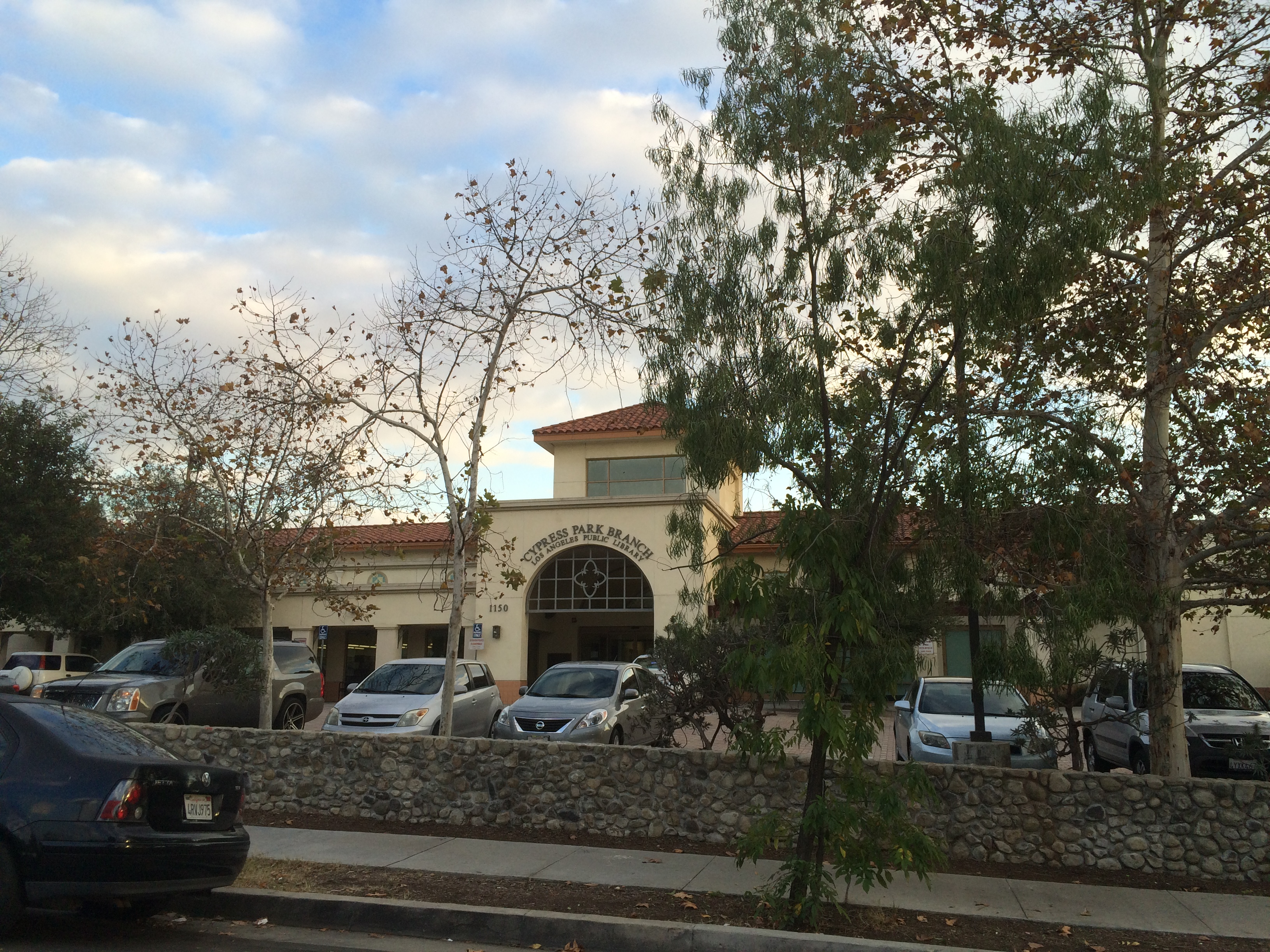
Cypress Park branch, LAPL

== Future ==
Cypress Park is in the beginning stages of economic revitalization, having been noted by the Los Angeles City Council and Community Redevelopment Agency of Los Angeles (CRA/LA) to have potential for economic growth. The CRA/LA has included Cypress Park in two of its proposed redevelopment plans, the Northeast Los Angeles River Project and the Cornfield Arroyo Seco Redevelopment Project.

Cypress Park is becoming closely associated with the movement to revitalize the Los Angeles River, due to the Los Angeles River Center and Gardens and the Rio de Los Angeles State Park within its boundaries.

To stem economic blight, the City Council in January 2010 approved an ordinance that banned any new auto-related businesses from opening in Cypress Park and Glassell Park.
