= Glassell Park Elementary School =

- U.S. National Register of Historic Places
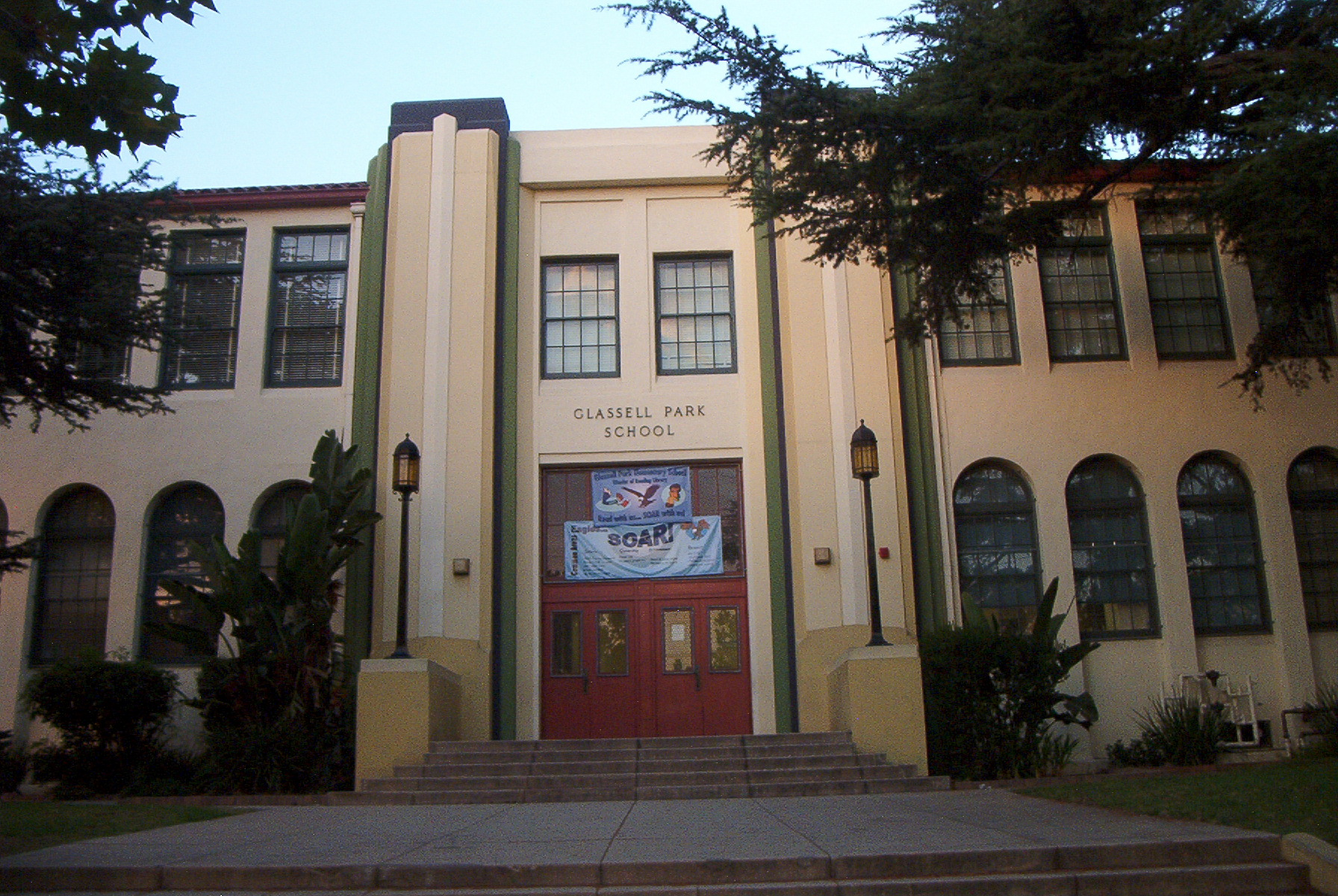
- School in 2007

- Location within the Los Angeles metropolitan area Location within California Location within the United States
- Location: 2211 West Avenue 30; Glassell Park neighborhood of Los Angeles, California
- Coordinates: 34.1045°N 118.2366°W
- Area: 1 acre (0.40 ha)
- Built: 1924
- Architects: Taylor, Edward Cray Taylor
- Architectural style: Mission/Spanish Revival
- Website: glassellparkes.lausd.org
- NRHP reference No.: 07000309
- Added to NRHP: April 13, 2007

Glassell Park Elementary School is an elementary school listed on the National Register of Historic Places. It is located at 2211 W. Avenue 30, in the Glassell Park neighborhood of Los Angeles, California. It is a PK-6 active school. The principal is Ms. Claudia Pelayo. It is a part of the Los Angeles Unified School District (LAUSD).

It was built in 1924 in Spanish Colonial Revival style. Following the 1933 Long Beach earthquake it was updated in P.W.A. Moderne architecture to make repairs and to meet new earthquake-related building codes. Elementary schools in Los Angeles were a part of the Los Angeles City School District until July 1, 1961, when it merged into LAUSD.

The school's main presentation to the public is its long, south-facing facade along W. Avenue 30 of length 190 feet (58 m). Its 100-foot (30 m) building frontage on Carlyle Street is less visible.

The property was deemed notable partly in the area of social history.

Only the 1924/35 school building and its portion of grounds were deemed to be contributing resources. Modular classrooms, playground areas, and a 1951-built cafeteria were considered intrusions that do not add to the historic character of the property.

== See also ==
- List of Registered Historic Places in Los Angeles
- List of Los Angeles Unified School District schools
- Andrew Glassell
