= Jeff Varasano =

American speedcuber

Jeff Varasano is an American speedcuber and entrepreneur known for his early accomplishments in Rubik’s Cube solving and for founding Varasano’s Pizzeria in Atlanta, Georgia.

== Unofficial Rubik's Cube United States record ==
At age 15, on October 8, 1981, Varasano set a record in the United States by solving the Rubik’s Cube in 24.67 seconds. His record-setting performance was featured on a live ABC7 News report, during which he described the achievement as an "unofficial record." Although this solve is not officially recognized by the World Cube Association, the organization that officially governs Rubik's Cube competitions because the organization didn't exist at the time, it contributed to his prominence in the early days of speedcubing.

The same year, Varasano published his methods in his book Jeff Conquers The Cube in 45 Seconds, And You Can Too!

== Pizzeria business ==
In addition to his contributions to speedcubing, Varasano is the founder and owner of Varasano’s Pizzeria in Atlanta, Georgia. The pizzeria has seen commercial success in the Atlanta area.

Local media outlets have profiled the establishment on several occasions. For instance, The Atlanta Journal-Constitution noted Varasano’s unique style. NPR also featured Varasano’s enterprise in a piece discussing his cooking methods.
