= Rio de Los Angeles State Park =

State recreation area in Los Angeles, California, United States

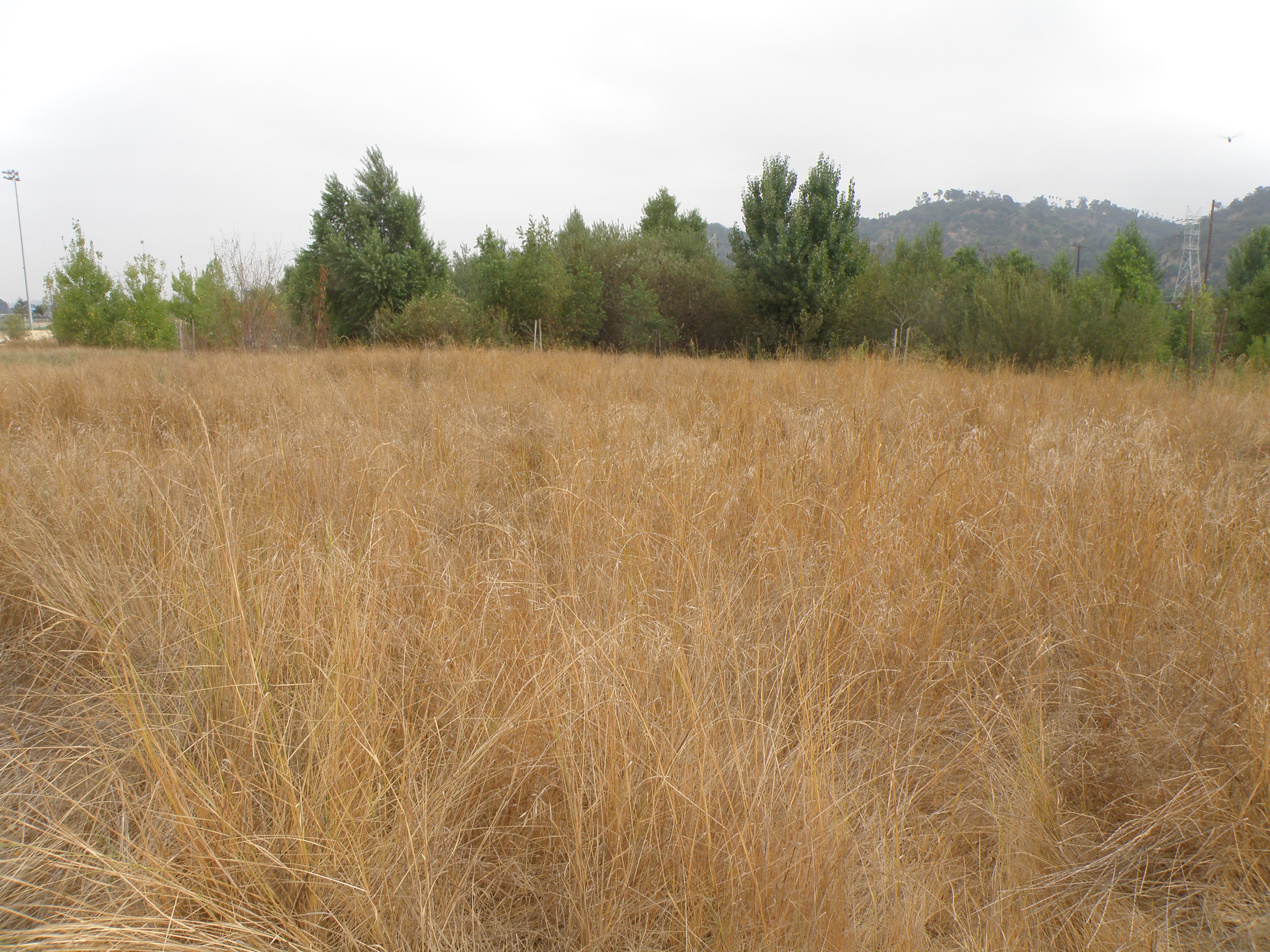
- Rio de Los Angeles State Park, California, USA
- Interactive map of Rio de Los Angeles State Park
- Type: State Recreation Area
- Location: Glassell Park
- Coordinates: 34°5′55″N 118°14′10″W
- Area: 247 acres (100 ha)
- Established: 2007; 19 years ago
- Administrator: California Department of Parks and Recreation
- Open: 9 a.m. - 10.30 p.m.
- Public transit: Los Angeles Metro Bus lines 90 and 94
- Website: parks.ca.gov

Rio de Los Angeles State Park is a California State Park along the Los Angeles River north of downtown Los Angeles in the neighborhood of Glassell Park, Los Angeles. The 40-acre (0.16 km^{2}) park includes restored wetlands featuring native plants as well as sports fields, a children's playground and a recreation building. Rio de Los Angeles State Park is currently managed in partnership with the City of Los Angeles Department of Parks and Recreation.

== History ==
The park was built on Taylor Yard, an abandoned freight-switching facility used by the Union Pacific and later the Southern Pacific railroads from the 1920s until 1985. Wildlife slowly began re-inhabiting the area and in the early-2000s an effort was begun to transform the abandoned brownfield land into a recreation area. The property was eventually purchased by the City of Los Angeles and demolition of the abandoned train terminals begin. The rail-lines connecting the Taylor Yard to the Union Pacific Railroad were torn out, the corroding train terminals where trains once loaded and unloaded tons of freight were demolished, and the concrete on the ground was removed by hand. Toxic waste left over from the work done at the Taylor Yard had to be systematically removed and treated before it would be deemed safe for public use by the city. After months of demolition and work done by conservationist groups, Rio de Los Angeles State Park was opened on April 21, 2007. It is located at 1900 San Fernando Road.

== Wildlife and vegetation ==
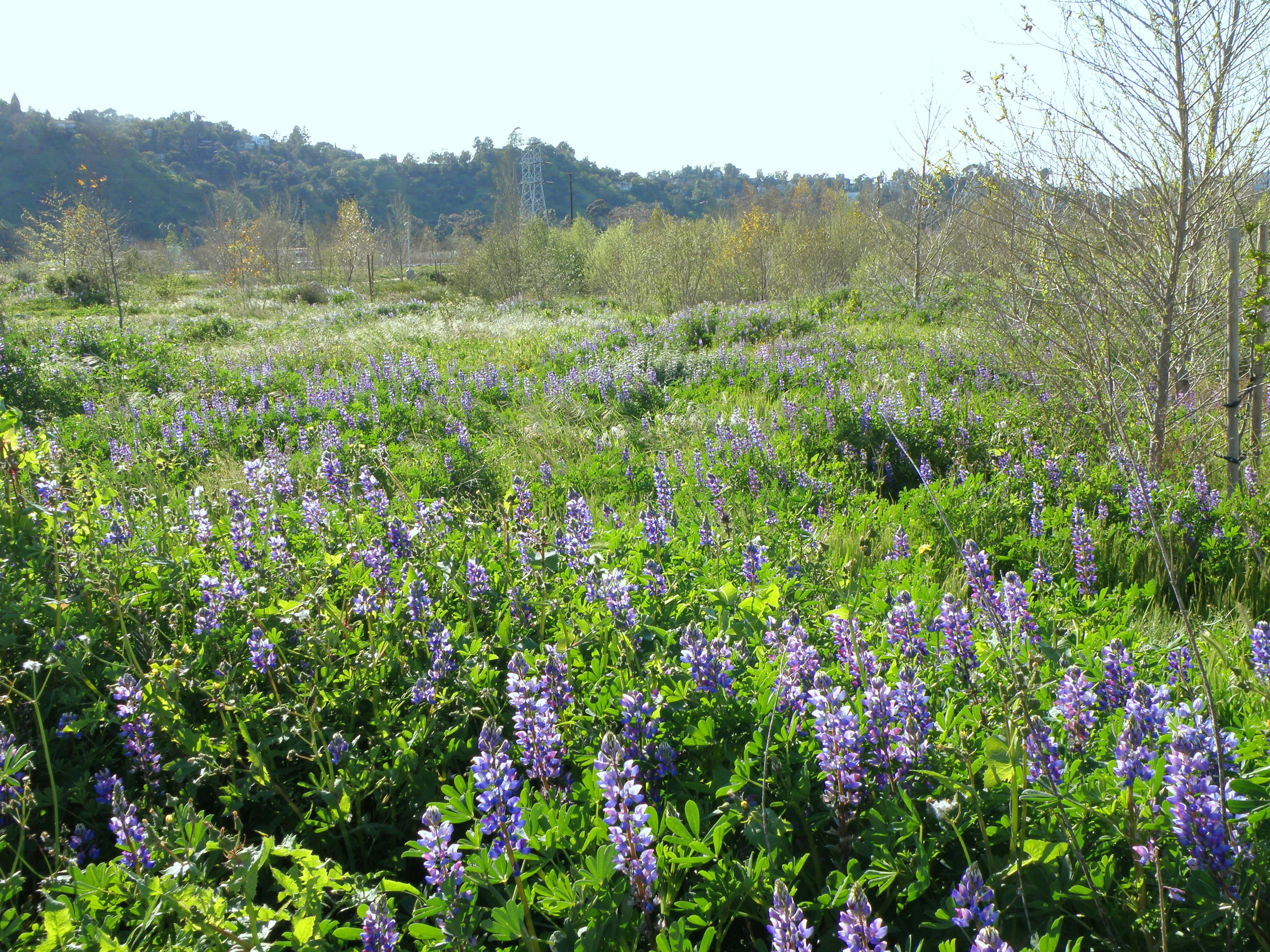
Rio de Los Angeles State Park lupines

=== Flora ===
The vast majority of the area consisting of the former Taylor Yard has now become overgrown and covered in thick brush consisting mainly of deergrass (Muhlenbergia rigens), greasewood (Adenostoma fasciculatum), desert lavender (Hyptis emoryi), manzanita, desert fan palm (Washingtonia filifera), scrub oak (Quercus berberidifolia), California poppy, and various other species of plants.

=== Fauna ===
The park is inhabited by a thriving population of coyote, gray fox, raccoon, striped skunk, Virginia opossum (introduced), desert cottontail, brush rabbit, California ground squirrel, woodrat, Botta's pocket gopher, various species of mice, as well as the highly invasive brown rat. The park also hosts a variety of reptilian and amphibian species which include California kingsnake, Pacific rattlesnake, gopher snake, two-striped garter snake, bullfrog (introduced), western fence lizard, common side-blotched lizard, common mudpuppy (introduced), as well as the endangered western pond turtle.

Over 150 different bird species have been reported along the Los Angeles River, including, great egret, great blue heron, snowy egret, black-crowned night heron, red-tailed hawk, prairie falcon, osprey, northern mockingbird, western bluebird, common raven, American crow, double-crested cormorant, Canada goose, mallard, gadwall, Muscovy duck (introduced), horned grebe, red-necked grebe, black-necked grebe, pied-billed grebe, American coot, cinnamon teal, western gull, mourning dove, killdeer, etc.

The Los Angeles River has become a fisherman's hotspot that has gained a reputation for having an abundance of common carp, largemouth bass, Nile tilapia, black bullhead, green sunfish, common pleco, Pacific lamprey, bluegill, fathead minnow, crayfish, mosquito fish, and quagga mussel. In early-2015 an attempt was made by conservationists to reintroduce the native steelhead trout to the Los Angeles River alongside the Rio de Los Angeles State Park. The effort turned out to be a huge failure after nearly all the juvenile trout ended up getting eaten by the already existing fish population.

== See also ==
- List of parks in Los Angeles
- List of parks in Los Angeles County, California
