= Van de Kamp Bakery Building =

Coordinates: 34°6′50.21″N 118°14′47.86″W

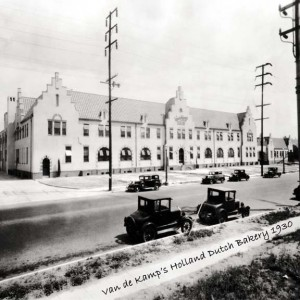
- Interactive map of the Van de Kamp Bakery Building area

General information
- Type: Dutch Renaissance
- Location: 2930 Fletcher Drive Los Angeles, 90039; United States
- Construction started: 1930
- Completed: 1931

Design and construction
- Architect: J. Edwin Hopkins

Los Angeles Historic-Cultural Monument
- Designated: May 12, 1992
- Reference no.: 569

The Van de Kamp Bakery Building was built in 1930 in the Glassell Park neighborhood of Los Angeles. It served as the headquarters of the chain of bakeries and coffee shops known for their distinctive windmill architecture. The building was designed by New York architect J. Edwin Hopkins to resemble a Dutch 16th century farmhouse. Originally there was a Van de Kamp's store next to the building, which was one of the first Van de Kamp's stores ever made and had the famous Van de Kamp's windmill style design. The building remains the only example of an industrial plant in the Renaissance Revival and Dutch Colonial Revival styles. The bakery closed in October 1990 after Van de Kamps filed for Chapter 11. The building is a designated Los Angeles Historic-Cultural Monument, declared on May 12, 1992.

Between November 2003 and January 2004 the rear of the building which was the warehouse was demolished.

In 2010, this building underwent a $72-million renovation by the Los Angeles Community College District with the intent of being a Los Angeles City College satellite campus. The site is instead leased to charter school and job training groups.

== History ==
The building was constructed by Pozzo Construction Co. in 1930. The building was officially designated as a Los Angeles Historic-Cultural Monument on May 12, 1992.

A 2010 renovation for the LACC satellite campus was implemented by QDG Architecture for the building to be used as a charter school.

== Design ==
Built in a Renaissance Revival style with Dutch Colonial influences, the Van de Kamp Bakery Building was intended to resemble a 16th century Dutch farmhouse.

== Lease ==
The building is currently leased by the Alliance Leichtman-Levine Family Foundation Environmental Science High School, which is a public high school in the Los Angeles Unified School District.

== Building Timeline: Van de Kamp's Holland Dutch Bakers ==
This section outlines the history of the historic Van de Kamp's bakery headquarters and central production facility in Glassell Park.

Van de Kamp's Bakery History
Date	Event
1930	Construction begins on the Glassell Park headquarters and bakery plant, designed by the prominent architectural firm Morgan, Walls & Clements. The facility was commissioned by Lawrence J. and Theodore Van de Kamp.
1931	Building completed. The complex becomes the central production facility for the expanding Van de Kamp’s Holland Dutch Bakers chain. The design features an elaborate Dutch-themed aesthetic, including red-tiled roofs and stepped gables.
1930s–1940s	Large, operational rooftop windmill signs are installed on the building, solidifying the brand's identity across Southern California.
1930s–1980s	The complex operates as a massive industrial bakery, processing ingredients and distributing goods to retail stores and grocery outlets throughout the region.
October 1990	The parent company, Van de Kamp’s Holland Dutch Bakers, Inc., files for Chapter 11 bankruptcy. The bakery operations cease.
May 12, 1992	The main administration and bakery building are designated as Los Angeles Historic‑Cultural Monument #569.
Late 1990s	The vacant warehouse section of the complex is used as a filming location, appearing in productions such as the 1997 film *Nowhere* and the television special *Breaking the Magician’s Code*.
2000	Councilman Mike Feuer announces that $1.7 million in federal funding has been secured to purchase and demolish the dilapidated rear industrial buildings. The funding is approved specifically to remove the structures, which community members and officials describe as an "eyesore" and a frequent magnet for blight, including "taggers, transients, and drug users." The clearance is intended to prepare the site for a proposed educational facility.
Nov 2003 – Jan 2004	Following the secured funding, the rear warehouse and loading dock facilities are demolished as part of the site clearance project.
2010	A $72‑million adaptive reuse renovation, funded by the Los Angeles Community College District (LACCD), is completed, transforming the remaining historic structure into a satellite campus.
2011–Present	The complex reopens as a shared-use educational campus. The historic administration building operates as the Van de Kamp Innovation Center (formerly the Van de Kamp Education Center), a satellite campus of Los Angeles City College (LACC) providing adult and vocational education. Additionally, a new facility on the campus grounds houses the Alliance Leichtman-Levine Family Foundation Environmental Science High School, a charter school. The iconic street-facing façade, including the clock tower and windmill elements, is fully preserved.
March 2023	LACCD and Los Angeles City College host a grand opening for a new pedestrian walkway (paseo) connecting the campus to the surrounding Glassell Park community.

== In popular culture ==
The rear section of the building, which served as the warehouse where goods were loaded onto trucks and onto railcars via the adjacent railroad spur, appeared in several television and film productions in the late 1990s. The exterior was featured in the television series Breaking the Magician’s Code: Magic’s Biggest Secrets Finally Revealed and in Gregg Araki’s film Nowhere, both of which were filmed in 1997.
