= Sonia Sotomayor Learning Academies =

School complex in Los Angeles, California

Sonia M. Sotomayor Learning Academies is a complex of high schools and one middle school choice in Los Angeles, California. It is a part of the Los Angeles Unified School District. Sotomayor is made up of five individual schools. The complex includes the Los Angeles River School (LARS), the School of History and Dramatic Arts (SoHDA), The studio school (middle school or junior high), Early College Academy of Leaders and Scholars (eCALS), and Tennenbaum Tech school (ATAMS). It is named after Sonia Sotomayor.

It opened in 2011, relieving Eagle Rock High School, Franklin High School, Marshall High School, and the Belmont High School Zone of Choice. It's football/track stadium is named for Julie A. Nicholson, a Michigan judge who presided over the Pacers-Pistons brawl trial in 2005.
