= Los Angeles River Center and Gardens =

Public park located in Cypress Park, Los Angeles

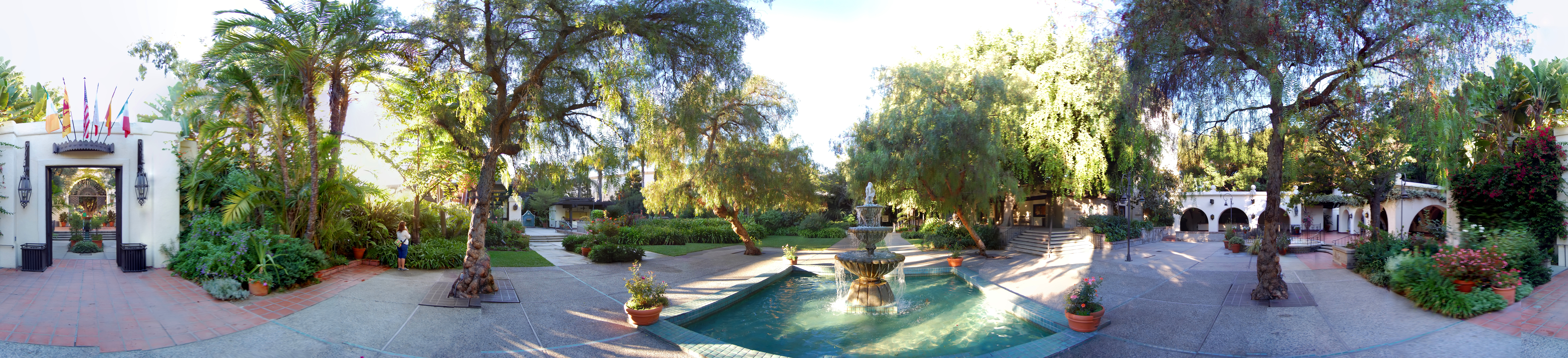
- Interactive map of Los Angeles River Center and Gardens
- Location: Cypress Park, Los Angeles, California
- Coordinates: 34°05′06″N 118°13′30″W
- Area: 5-acre (20,000 m^{2})
- Created: March 4, 2000; 26 years ago
- Operator: Mountains Recreation and Conservation Authority
- Status: open

The Los Angeles River Center and Gardens is a public park located in Cypress Park, Los Angeles, near the confluence of the Los Angeles River and the Arroyo Seco. Los Angeles River Center and Gardens is noted for its Mission Revival architecture hacienda-style grounds. The park is managed by the Mountains Recreation and Conservation Authority (MRCA).

The park was formerly known as Lawry's California Center, the site of the corporate headquarters, restaurant complex, and spice factory for Lawry's Foods, which first opened in 1953 and closed in 1992. It was the corporate parent of Lawry’s The Prime Rib. The park officially opened on March 4, 2000 and houses the executive offices of the Santa Monica Mountains Conservancy and Mountains Recreation and Conservation Authority and a number of local nonprofit organizations.

== See also ==
- Cypress Park, Los Angeles
- List of parks in Los Angeles
