= Taylor Yard =

Former railroad yard redeveloped as park and housing

Coordinates: 34°5′55.36″N 118°14′16.96″W

Taylor Yard, in Los Angeles California, United States, is a former railway station and classification yard and headquarters of Southern Pacific Railroad operations in Southern California. The site has been gradually redeveloped with public open space, housing, and other uses including the Rio de Los Angeles State Park. A new Metrolink maintenance facility was built on the southern end of the yard grounds. The site was purchased by the Southern Pacific in 1911 and continually reshaped and remade over the course of the early 20th century for the purposes of inspection, repair, and storage of freight cars on the Southern Pacific Fruit Express line.

== History ==
Taylor Yard was established in 1911 on the previous site of Taylor Feed Mill (from which the yard gets its name). It was rebuilt in 1949. By the 1950s, Taylor Yard was the central node in the freight network into and out of Los Angeles for Southern Pacific, as the classification yard had grown in complexity and size concurrent with increases both manufacturing and the overall population of Los Angeles. The Classification Yard was split into three operational zones, "with the receiving unit at the west end, then the classification unit, and at the east end the departure unit."

Competition from the trucking industry and the closure of American manufacturing plants led to the decline of the Yard after the 1950s. In 1983, an average of 25,000 railroad cars moved through Taylor Yard and 1,200 workers were employed in its operations, down from 5,000 in the 1950s. Southern Pacific closed the terminal on November 14, 1985, citing declining business. Workers and union leaders cited a merger plan between Southern Pacific and Santa Fe Railway, which had been sharply criticized by the U.S. Justice Department, but endorsed by the U.S. Department of Transportation.

The Southern Pacific closed the facilities and bulldozed the site in 1988. In 1991, the county acquired the eastern portion of the site.

In 2017, the city acquired G2 parcel, the northern portion of Taylor Yard.

== Developments ==
In 2003, the California Department of Parks and Recreation began working with the community to develop the Rio de Los Angeles State Park. The first phase of the park, built on 279 acres (1.13 km^{2}), was completed in April 2007.

=== Taylor Yard Bikeway and Pedestrian Bridge ===
In June 2019, the City of Los Angeles began construction on the Taylor Yard Bikeway and Pedestrian Bridge to connect Taylor Yard with Elysian Valley on the west side of the Los Angeles River. The 400 feet (120 m) long and 18 feet (5.5 m) wide bikeway and pedestrian bridge opened March 2022. The bridge is part of Los Angeles River Revitalization Master Plan. The $20.8 million project has been wholly funded by Los Angeles County Metropolitan Transportation Authority.

=== Taylor Yard G2 River Park ===
The Taylor Yard G2 River Park will be built on a 42-acre site (0.17 km^{2}) acquired by the city in 2017 for $60 million. The park is intended to be provide recreational park space, wetlands and other amenities, and has been described by Mayor Eric Garcetti as the "crown jewel" of a broader ongoing initiative to restore 11 mi (18 km) of the Los Angeles River. The park is expected to be completed by 2028, in time for the 2028 Summer Olympics. In July 2019, the city announced 3 design proposals for the park. A viewing platform will be built to enable the public to view changes to the river habitat prior to the 2028 opening.

=== Paseo del Río project ===
The Paseo del Río project (Spanish for "river walk") will be an approximately 1 mi (1.6 km) long riverfront walkway constructed on Taylor Yard, along the banks of the Los Angeles River. The project is being overseen by the 100 Acre Partnership, and will be funded by grants from the Santa Monica Mountains Conservancy. Officials with the City of Los Angeles, the State Parks Department, and the Mountains Recreation and Conservation Authority selected a final design in 2023.

=== Bowtie Parcel ===
The State of California owns the G1 parcel, colloquially called the "Bowtie Parcel" on a plot of 18 acres (0.073 km^{2}), immediately north of G2, along the banks of the Los Angeles River. There are plans to convert this parcel into phase 2 of the phase two of Rio de Los Angeles State Park. The state currently uses the space for public art programming, and the site also hosts several site-specific installations, and numerous pop-up events, in collaboration with a local nonprofit, Clockshop.

=== Private developments ===
Taylor Yard Transit Village is a mixed-use development built on 24 acres (0.097 km^{2}) at the southern end of Taylor Yard, immediately southeast of Rio de Los Angeles State Park. The development comprises rental apartments, senior housing, homes, commercial space and greenspace.

In spring 2020, a developer proposed the construction of a mixed-used complex immediately north of the Bowtie Parcel, comprising 419 multi-family residential units, commercial space, and a multi-story parking structure.

== Ecology ==
Taylor Yard sits adjacent to the Los Angeles River. As the river passes Taylor Yard, it flows through the Glendale Narrows. This portion of the river has an unlined channel bottom due to the high groundwater table. The soft-bottom includes riparian vegetation, open water, and sand bars, which are supported by year-round flows.

== Architecture ==
Among the most iconic features of the site was the Roundhouse and the Dayton Tower. The Dayton is the only building of the site that has not been demolished. It has been relocated three times.

== Environmental investigations ==
Soil mapping reveals four areas of potential concern (AOPCs) which exhibit high concentrations of lead, hydrocarbons, arsenic, and antimony. The first AOPC area surrounds the former diesel turntable, the second envelops the former fueling and sanding tracks, the third sits along the southern portion of the former roundhouse, and the fourth is located near the diesel shops.

"Results of environmental investigations conducted at Taylor Yard to date indicate that subsurface soils in the Active Yard generally consist of fill material extending from the ground surface to a depth of approximately seven feet below ground surface (bgs), and sands and silty sands with minor discontinuous clayey sands extending from seven to 35 feet bgs." Additionally, there is an extensive infrastructure consisting of thirty onsite wells, twenty-two of which are located in the active yard, to monitor the quantity and quality of groundwater on-site.
