= North Hollywood High School =

Public high school in California, United States

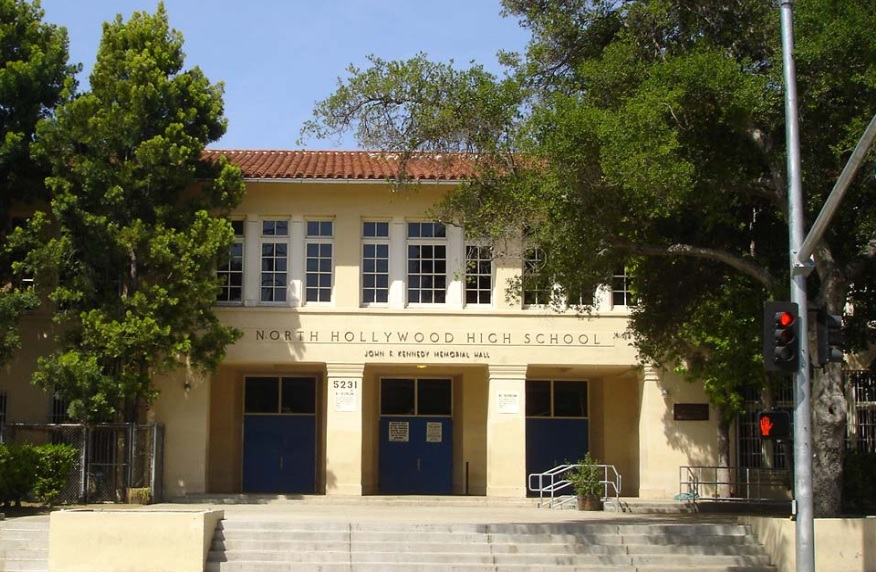

Location
- 5231 Colfax Avenue; Los Angeles, California 91601; United States; 34°09′57″N 118°23′20″W

Information
- School type: Public high school
- Established: 1927; 99 years ago
- Status: 🟩 Open
- School district: Los Angeles Unified School District
- Superintendent: Andres Chait
- NCES School ID: 062271003230
- Principal: Ricardo Rosales
- Teaching staff: 119.13 (on an FTE basis)
- Grades: 9-12
- Age range: 14-18
- Enrollment: 2,444 (2024–2025)
  - Grade 9: 665
  - Grade 10: 651
  - Grade 11: 593
  - Grade 12: 535
- Student to teacher ratio: 20.52
- Language: English
- Hours in school day: 7 hours 10 minutes (Monday, Wednesday-Friday); 6 hours 11 minutes (Tuesday)
- Campus: Urban
- Colors: Blue, white, gray
- Song: Huskies Are We
- Athletics conference: East Valley League; CIF Los Angeles City Section
- Mascot: Husky
- Nickname: Huskies, Big Blue
- Rivals: John H. Francis Polytechnic High School; Ulysses S. Grant High School; East Valley High School
- Newspaper: The Arcade
- Feeder schools: Walter Reed Middle School; Sun Valley Middle School; Roy Romer Middle School; Gaspar de Portola Middle School
- Website: NHHS; NHHS HGM; NHHS Zoo Magnet; NHHS Music

North Hollywood High School (NHHS) is a public high school in the North Hollywood neighborhood of Los Angeles, California, United States. It is in the San Fernando Valley and enrolls approximately 2,500 students. Several neighborhoods, including most of North Hollywood, Valley Village, Studio City and Sun Valley, send students to it. It is accredited by the Western Association of Schools and Colleges. Its principal is Ricardo Rosales.

== Facilities ==
As of 2026, North Hollywood High School is in the finishing stages of a "comprehensive modernization" project started in 2017, which included retrofitting Kennedy Hall and Frasher Hall for safety, demolishing Randolph Hall and many portable classrooms, and constructing a new "C" building, a two-story gymnasium with weightrooms and lockers, outdoor basketball courts, a baseball/softball field, a staff parking lot, an improved computer lab/library, a woodshop, an autoshop, a student store, and tennis courts. The agricultural area, farm, garden, and football field were left untouched. In 2026, the new auditorium was opened and named the John Williams Performing Arts Center

== History ==
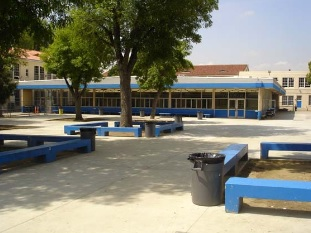
The student quad.

Built in 1927, Lankershim High School was named for the town of Lankershim (first called Toluca, now North Hollywood) and its founding family. It opened with only a main building, auditorium, gymnasium and a shop and mechanics building, with 800 students, graduating its first class in 1928. The Board of Education was asked to employ teachers who were already residents of North Hollywood, creating jobs and education opportunities in the area. Lankershim High School was renamed North Hollywood High School in 1929. In 1937, a girls' gymnasium and a second major classroom building, now named Frasher Hall after former principal Roscoe Frasher, were built. In 1950, the third major classroom building, now named Randolph Hall, was built. In the 1950s, many smaller construction projects took place, including the agricultural classrooms, the boys' gymnasium, the home-side bleachers and the instrumental music room. In 1965, the main hall was named the John F. Kennedy Memorial Hall after the president. In 1966, the cafeteria, student store and two shop buildings were built. In 1973, the Amelia Earhart Continuation High School was built on the campus' northeast corner. In the late 1990s, thirteen modular buildings were installed to support an increase in the number of students.

It was in the Los Angeles City High School District until 1961, when it merged into LAUSD.

=== 1990s and beyond ===
In 1996, the LAUSD board voted to move NHHS to a year-round schedule, but after more classroom space was found, the board reversed course. Several NHHS parents and community members did not want a year-round schedule since they feared it would negatively impact the Highly Gifted Magnet. According to the 1996 scheduling, magnet students were supposed to get July–May, which would have affected their ability to attend summer programs operated by Ivy League universities. The Zoo magnet students were to get the September–June schedule.

In 2000, Ramón C. Cortines, the LAUSD superintendent, stated that the overcrowding at NHHS was more severe than originally anticipated, and he announced that NHHS was going year-round. This was despite parents and students protesting against the move for several months. From 2000 to 2007, NHHS was a year-round school with three tracks.

In 2006, East Valley High School opened, relieving overcrowding at NHHS. In 2007, the traditional calendar was re-adopted and the students were divided into many Small Learning Communities (SLCs). All but three of these were closed in June 2012.

In 2015, it was announced that NHHS was selected to undergo major renovations, including upgrading buildings and removing portable buildings, to be completed in five years.

In 2018, there was a proposal to co-locate a charter school, Valley International Preparatory High School (VIPHS), on the NHHS campus, but there was student opposition; students created an online petition to oppose the co-location.

== Academics ==
NHHS contains three magnet programs; the Highly Gifted Magnet (HGM), the Zoo Magnet, and the STEM Magnet. There are also three Small Learning Communities (SLCs); the Humanitas School for Advanced Studies, the Home Engineering Academy, and the Freshmen Academy.

=== Highly Gifted Magnet ===
The Highly Gifted Magnet was established in 1989, and is a component of the voluntary integration program of the LAUSD, designed to provide an academically challenging college preparatory program. The program is designed to prepare its students to thrive in the most demanding of university environments. The students in the HGM are from all over Los Angeles, and have a variety of extracurricular interests, as well as diversity in their academic directions.

Children are eligible if they test in the 99.5th percentile or above on an intelligence test conducted by an LAUSD psychologist. Priority is given to children with 99.9%, officially “Highly Gifted” by LAUSD definition. If there are openings remaining in the program, “Gifted” students with 99.5%-99.8% may be admitted with priority based on magnet points. The program had 265 students, 4 administrators, and 7 faculty members in 2016.

=== Zoo Magnet ===
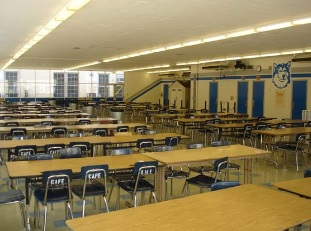
The student cafeteria.

The Zoo Magnet was established in 1981, and is a specialized school that buses students to a small campus next to the Los Angeles Zoo in Griffith Park. At this site, approximately 300 students take standard classes such as history, math, and English, in addition to Advanced Placement classes related to biological and zoological sciences. Many of these classes include fieldwork in the Los Angeles Zoo and Botanical Gardens, Los Angeles River ecosystem, Autry National Center and the natural world of Griffith Park for tours and observation. Classes are on a block schedule, meeting three days a week for two hours per class.

=== STEM Magnet ===
The STEM Magnet was established in 2018, and is an alternative course of study that prepares students for college and career opportunities in Science, Technology, Engineering, and Math.

=== Small Learning Communities ===
The Small Learning Communities (SLCs) are intended to increase student achievement by personalizing the educational experience of students in large schools. Of the eight SLCs originally created, three remain as of 2025; the Humanitas School for Advanced Studies (HSAS), the Home Engineering Academy (HEA), and the Freshmen Academy (FA). The HSAS is designed for identified gifted, high achieving, high-ability students who show an interest in taking Honors and Advanced Placement courses. The HEA specializes in the construction and building trades.

=== Rankings ===
In 2026, U.S. News & World Report ranked NHHS as #1,267 in the country, #169 of CA High Schools, #80 in CA Metro Area High Schools, #14 in LAUSD, with an overall score of 92.92/100.

In 2026, Niche ranked NHHS among public schools as #966 in America, #180 in California, #82 in the Los Angeles area, and #43 in Los Angeles County. NHHS was awarded an overall grade of "A", with an A in Academics, an A+ in Teachers, an A− in Diversity, an A in College Prep, a B in Clubs and Activities, a B in Administration, a B− in Sports, a C+ in Food, and a C+ in Resources and Facilities.

In 2026, schooldigger.com ranked NHHS as #385 of all high schools in California.

In 2026, greatschools.org rated NHHS 8/10 overall, with a 9/10 test score rating, and 7/10 college readiness rating.

In 2026, academicinfluence.com ranked NHHS as #32 in the country.

In 2026, myschoolscout.com scored NHHS 8.8/10, and ranked it as #501 in CA, #1 in public schools in North Hollywood, #69 in LAUSD, and gave an equity score of 9.2/10. It was also given a 9/0/10 for Student Progress, 9.0/10 for Academics, 8.7/10 for College Readiness, and 8.2/10 for Resources & Environment.

In 2025, LAUSD awarded the NHHS Zoo Magnet with the Merit Award of Excellence.

In 2023, Magnet Schools of America designated the NHHS Zoo Magnet as the Top Magnet School of Excellence. In 2022 and 2024, it was designated as a Magnet School of Excellence. In 2019 and 2020, it was designated as a Magnet School of Distinction.

=== Advanced Placement Courses ===
NHHS offers 25 Advanced Placement courses in biology, calculus AB, calculus BC, chemistry, computer science A, computer science principles, English language and composition, English literature and composition, environmental science, European history, French language, human geography, macroeconomics, music theory, physics 2, physics C: electricity and magnetism, physics C: mechanics, psychology, Spanish language, Spanish literature, statistics, studio art, US government and politics, US history and world history.

For the 2023-24 school year, 56% of students took at least one AP test, with 41% of students passing at least one AP test.

== Extracurricular ==
=== Competitive academics ===
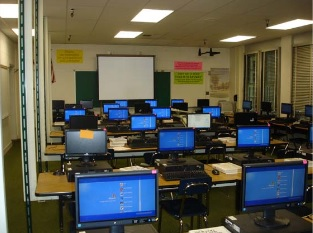
One of the computer labs

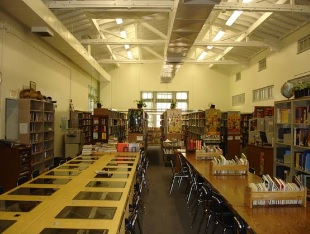
The library

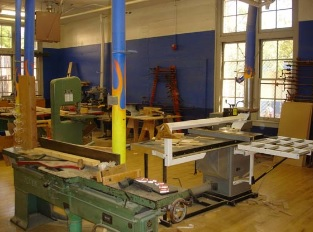
The woodshop

NHHS offers many successful teams in competitive academics: Academic Decathlon, CyberPatriot, DECA, Duke Moot Court, FIRST Robotics, Future Farmers of America, Mock Trial, Model United Nations, North American Computational Linguistics Open competition, National Ocean Sciences Bowl, Physics Olympiad, Science Bowl, Science Olympiad, and Speech and Debate.

=== Sport ===
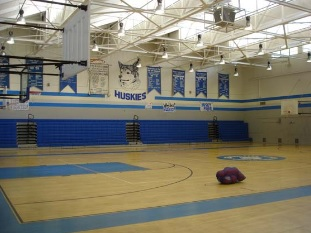
The boys' gym

The NHHS Huskies compete in the CIF Los Angeles City Section's East Valley League. NHHS's rivals are Polytechnic High School, Ulysses S. Grant High School, and East Valley High School. The NHHS Athletics Department offers American football, archery, baseball, basketball (boys' and girls'), cheerleading, cross country, golf, soccer (boys' and girls'), softball (girls'), Students Run LA, tennis, track and field, ultimate frisbee, volleyball (boys' and girls') and weight training.

=== Performing arts ===
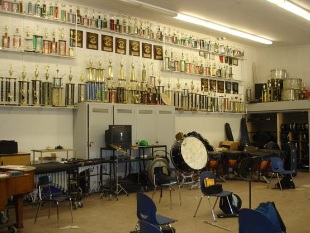
The music room

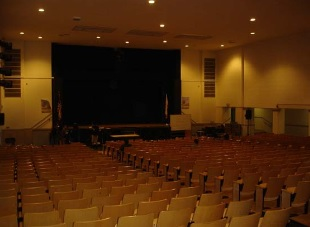
The auditorium

NHHS offers a wide variety of performing arts courses.

- Marching Band / Concert Band - During the fall semester, the marching band is typically a Division 2A, 70-member ensemble called the Royal Regiment, that performs as a pep band at football games, and competes in field tournaments. During the spring semester, the marching band becomes a concert band that performs at festivals, the annual Spring Concert, and various school events. Other band-related afterschool ensembles include Brass Ensemble, Woodwind Ensemble, and Indoor Drumline.
- Color Guard - During the fall semester, the color guard teams up with the marching band to perform at football games and compete in field tournaments. During the spring semester, the color guard performs at competitions and the annual Spring Concert.
- Advanced Jazz Band - During both semesters, the jazz band is an approximately 20-member ensemble that performs in festivals, the annual Winter Concert, the annual Spring Concert, and various events.
- String Orchestra - During both semesters, the orchestra performs at the annual Winter Concert, the annual Spring Concert, and festivals.
- Vocal Ensemble - During both semesters, the vocal ensemble performs at the annual Winter Concert, the annual Spring Concert, and festivals.
- Guitar - During both semesters, there are two levels of guitar class offered.

== Demographics ==
Ethnicity
Hispanic	64.1%
White	18.4%
Asian	10.4%
African American	2.7%
Two+ Races	2.1%
Filipino	1.1%
American Indian	0.1%
Pacific Islander	0.1%

Gender
Male	54.2%
Female	45.8%
Non-Binary	-

Miscellaneous
English Learners	7.8%
Foster Youth	0.2%
Homeless	0.7%
Migrant	-
Socioeconomically Disadvantaged	72.8%
Students with Disabilities	11.9%

== Achievements ==
- At the Regional Science Bowl, NHHS has won 1st place every year since 1998, missing only 2005 and 2014. At the National Science Bowl, NHHS won 1st place in 2001, and 2021.
- At the CSU Long Beach Math Day at the Beach, NHHS won 1st place in 2006.
- At the Duke Moot Court National Tournament, NHHS has won 1st place in 2009 and 2010.
- At the Constitutional Rights Foundation's Mock Trial State Competition, NHHS won 1st place in 1982.
- At the National Speech and Debate Association's district qualifier, NHHS's speech and debate team won sweepstakes in Congressional Debate in 2014. In three of California High School Speech Association's Tri-County Forensics League competitions, NHHS's team took sweepstakes in 2014.
- At the CyberPatriot National Finals, NHHS won 1st place in 2014, and 2nd and 5th place in 2015. At the California Cyber Innovation Challenge, NHHS won 1st place in 2016 and 2017. In 2017, three teams were sent to the national finals and one team won 1st place. In 2018, three teams were sent to the national finals and won 1st, 2nd, and 9th place. In 2019, NHHS won 2nd place in the Open Class Division.
- The NHHS FFA chapter was ranked a "Superior Chapter" by the California FFA Association in 1951, 1953, 1954, 1957, 1958, 1959, 1960, 1963, 1967, 1980, 1989, and 1990. At the Los Angeles FFA Horticulture Contest, NHHS teams won 1st place in both Advanced Horticulture and Floral Horticulture in 2015.
- At the Southern California DECA Conference, NHHS won 1st and 2nd place in marketing, and 1st place in business law and ethics in 2016.
- The NHHS Royal Regiment Marching Band won 1st place in 1984, 1985, 1986, 1989, 1991, 1993, 1997, 1998, 2001, 2002, 2004, 2018, and 2022 at LAUSD Band and Drill Team City Championships. The band was also SCSBOA finalists in 2004, 2005, and 2006.
- The NHHS Indoor Drumline won 1st place in 2016, 2017, 2018, and 2019 at Drums Across California's Championships, and 1st place in 2022 at West Coast Performance Association's Championships.
- As of 2024, NHHS has a graduation rate of 96.4%.

== Filming location ==
NHHS has been the filming location for movies, television shows, and other productions, including the following:

- The Human Comedy (1943)
- The Rockford Files (1974–1980)
- The White Shadow (1978–1981)
- Demolition High (1996)
- Curious (music video by LSG) (1998)
- Joan of Arcadia (2003–2005)
- The Lockhavens (2009)
- The Tudor Tutor (2010)
- Shameless (season 4, episode 9) (2014)
- Canaan Land (2020)

== Notable alumni ==
- Khalil Abdul-Rahman, music producer
- Larry Agran, Irvine City Councilmember, former Mayor, lawyer
- Walt Ambord, American football player, coach
- Harry Anderson, actor
- Tony Angell, artist, author
- Suzan Ball, actress
- Brian Baima, former American football player
- Noah Beery, Jr., actor
- Stuart Benjamin, film producer
- Eve Bernhardt, actress
- Richard Beymer, actor
- Mayim Bialik, actress
- Stefano Bloch, author, professor
- Francesca Block, author
- Donald "D.J." Bonebrake, musician
- Perry Botkin Jr., musician, composer, producer
- Ron Brand, former Major League baseball player
- Michael Broggie, author, historian
- Barbara Brogliatti, public relations, marketing executive
- Philip Brown, actor
- Bill Cable, actor, model
- Christy Canyon, actress
- Cindy Carol, actress
- Adam Carolla, comedian
- Darleen Carr, actress, singer
- Nick Cassavetes, director, actor
- Sydney Chaplin, actor
- Andrei Cherny, author, politician, banker
- Lenora Claire, media personality
- Bert Convy, actor, singer, game show host
- Jordan Cronenweth, cinematographer
- Gary Crosby, actor, singer
- Robert DeHaven, Air Force colonel
- Sandy Descher, child actress
- Dean Devlin, producer, writer, actor
- Maureen Dragone, journalist, author and founder of the Young Artist Awards
- Doug Dunlap, radio personality
- Denis Dutton, media activist, web entrepreneur
- David Eisley, musician
- Michael Erush, former soccer player, coach
- Edan Everly, musician
- Shelley Fabares, actress
- Stanley Fafara, actor
- Tiger Fafara, actor
- Brent Fischer, composer/arranger
- George Frenn, Olympian
- Rob Friedman, co-chairman of Lionsgate Motion Picture Group
- Ernestine Fu, venture capital investor, author
- Gil Garfield, musician
- Carrington Garland, actress
- Teri Garr, actress
- Cuba Gooding Jr., actor
- Omar Gooding, actor
- Farley Granger, actor
- Brian Austin Green, actor
- Bruce Guerin, child actor, pianist
- Bob Gurr, amusement ride designer
- Don Hahn, film producer
- Khrystyne Haje, actress
- Alyson Hannigan, actress
- David Harper, actor
- Emery Hawkins, animator
- Roberta Haynes, actress
- Jamake Highwater, writer, journalist
- William Hohri, activist
- Desiree Horton, TV personality, helicopter pilot
- Jerry Houser, actor
- Julia Hu, technology entrepreneur
- Michael Hutchence, musician, lead singer of INXS
- Sasha Jenson, actor
- Andy Johnson, former NBA player
- Chuck Jones, animator, director
- Dana Jones, former basketball player
- Janet Louise Johnson, actress, educator
- Gary Kibbe, cinematographer
- Josh "Andrew" Koenig, actor
- Jonathan Kovacs, singer
- Eva Lee Kuney, actress, dancer
- Alan Ladd, actor
- Arthur Lee, former basketball player
- Jonah Lehrer, author
- Pam Ling, physician, castmate on The Real World: San Francisco
- Barry Livingston, actor
- Stanley Livingston, actor
- Donald Losby, actor
- Marlon Lucky, former American football player
- Heather MacRae, vocalist, actress
- Meredith MacRae, actress
- Brett Marx, actor, producer
- Tom Maudlin, former NFL player
- Ralph Mauriello. former Major League baseball player
- Oliver Mayer, playwright, screenwriter, author
- Mike McDonald, former NFL player
- Elizabeth McGovern, actress, musician
- Jake McLaughlin, actor
- Nick McLean, cinematographer
- Jimmy McNichol, actor
- Nick Menza, drummer/percussionist
- Martin Milner, actor
- Aaron Mitchell, former NFL player
- Rolando Molina, actor
- Johanna Moore, computer scientist
- Erin Moran, actress
- Susan Morrow, actress
- Tim Mountford, cyclist
- Corin Nemec, actor, producer
- Ken Osmond, actor
- Karen Pendleton, original Mouseketeer
- Gerald Pulley, U.S. Navy photographer
- Eduard Punset, Spanish politician, lawyer, economist, science popularizer
- Alan Robbins, politician
- Carlos Romero, ice skater, actor
- Ronnie Rondell Jr., actor, director, stuntman, stunt coordinator
- Bob Ronka, Los Angeles City Council member, 1977–81
- Barbara Ruick, actress, singer
- Jennifer Runyon, actress
- Maia Sharp, singer, songwriter
- Amy Sherman-Palladino, producer, director, writer
- Robert Shields, mime, actor
- Daniel Smith, son of Anna Nicole Smith
- Shawnee Smith, actress, musician
- Susan Sontag, author, theorist, activist
- Joshua Stangby, former NFL/CFL wide receiver
- Mary Kay Stearns, actress
- Robert Stebbins, biologist, illustrator
- Charles Joel Stone, statistician and mathematician
- Stephen Stromberg, journalist
- Guy Sularz, former Major League baseball player
- Beth Sullivan, screenwriter, executive producer
- Robert Swink, film editor
- Anthony Sydes, actor, Purple Heart recipient
- Margaret Talbot, essayist
- Russ Tamblyn, actor, dancer
- Buck Taylor, actor, painter
- Anthony 'Scooter' Teague, actor, dancer
- Michael Tilson Thomas, musician, composer, director of the San Francisco Symphony
- Eugene Tissot, Jr., U.S. Navy Rear Admiral
- Ronne Troup, actress
- Ron Unz, entrepreneur, political activist
- Benny Urquidez, kickboxer
- Hana Vu, singer, songwriter
- Chuck Walling, actor
- Morgan Webb, TV personality
- Julius Wechter, bandleader of Baja Marimba Band
- Eugene Wescott, geophysicist
- Jim Wheeler, politician
- De'voreaux White, actor
- John Williams, composer, conductor, pianist
- Lauren Woodland, actress, attorney
- Scott Yancey, TV personality
- Charles Yukl, ragtime pianist, murderer
- Philip Zimbardo, psychologist
