= HGM =

HGM may refer to:

- General Hospital of Mexico (Spanish: Hospital General de México), in Mexico City
- Haiǁom dialect, part of the Khoekhoe dialect continuum
- Higham railway station (Kent), England, by National Rail station code
- Highly Gifted Magnet, a program for talented students in Los Angeles, United States
- Museum of Military History, Vienna (German: Heeresgeschichtliches Museum), in Vienna, Austria
