= East Valley High School (California) =

Public high school in California, United States

East Valley Senior High

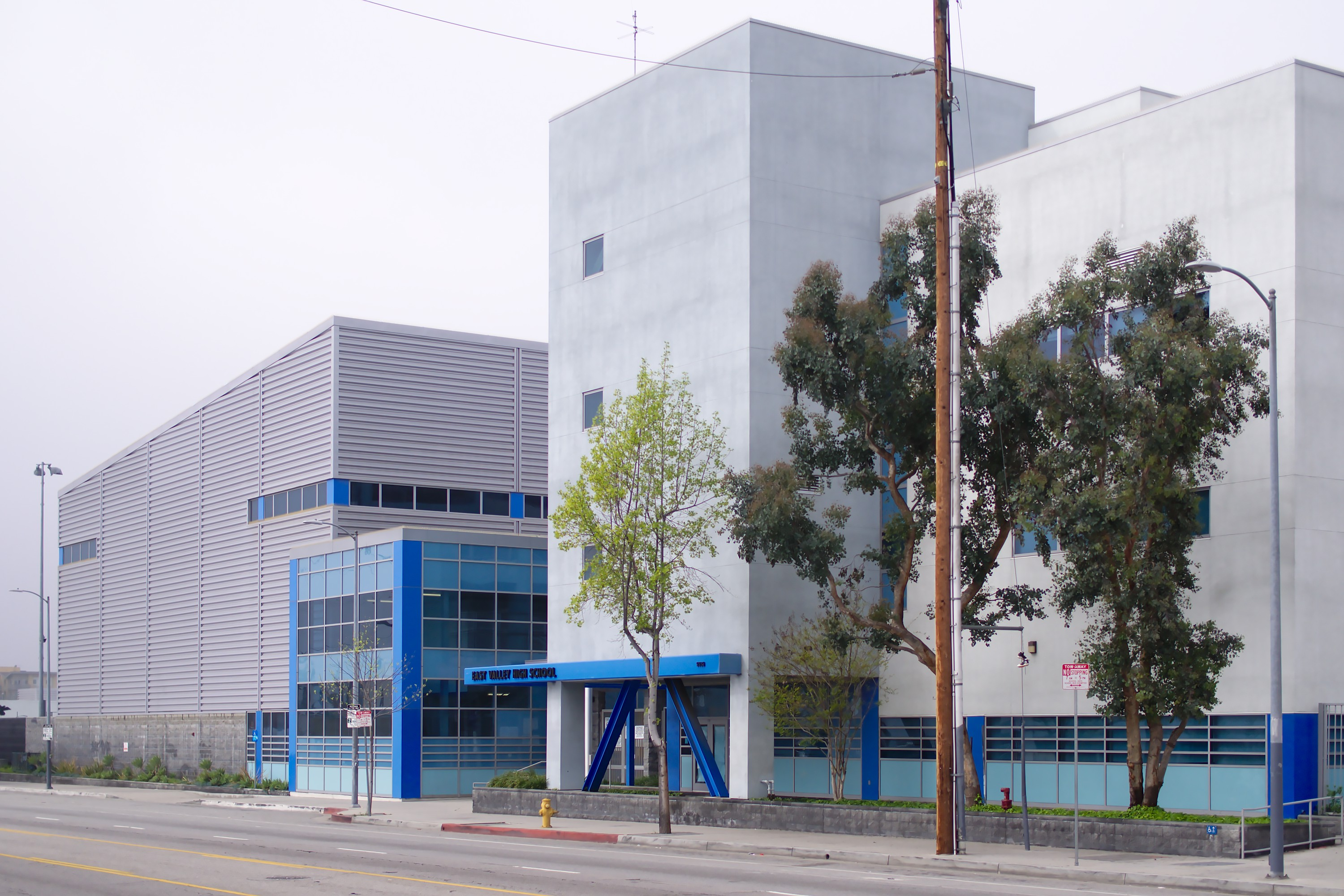

Location
- 5525 Vineland Ave. North Hollywood, CA 91601; 34.171°N 118.37088°W

Information
- School type: Public high school
- Motto: Keep it under 7, go Falcons!
- Established: October 3, 2006; 19 years ago
- Status: 🟩 Opened
- Locale: City, Large
- School district: Los Angeles Unified School District
- NCES District ID: 0622710
- NCES School ID: 062271011651
- Principal: Flaminio Zarate
- Teaching staff: 33.26 (on an FTE basis)
- Grades: 9–12
- Age range: 14–18
- Enrollment: 558 (2024–25)
  - Male: 313
  - Female: 245
- Student to teacher ratio: 16.78
- Language: English
- Colors: Blue; Black
- Athletics conference: East Valley League; CIF Los Angeles City Section
- Mascot: Falcon
- Nickname: Falcons
- Rivals: North Hollywood High School; Robert Fulton College Preparatory School
- Newspaper: The Falcon Newsletter
- Feeder schools: Walter Reed Middle School; Sun Valley Middle School; Roy Romer Middle School
- Website: Official Website

East Valley High School (EVHS) is a public high school located at 5525 Vineland Avenue in the North Hollywood area of Los Angeles, California, United States. It is a part of the Los Angeles Unified School District. East Valley High School shares the same campus with The Science Academy STEM Magnet.
