= Julia Hu =

American entrepreneur

Julia Hu (born March 24, 1985) is an American entrepreneur and the co-founder and chief executive officer of the digital health company Lark Health. Hu was named one of the “Top 10 Women in Tech to Watch” by Forbes and was a winner of Inc. Magazine’s “30 under 30, Class of 2013". She was listed in 2016 as one of “17 Female Healthcare CEOs to Know,” in Becker’s Hospital Review, and was honored in 2017 as one of Silicon Valley Business Journal’s “40 Under 40". Silicon Valley Business Journal listed Hu as one of “Silicon Valley's 2018 Women of Influence".

== Early life and education ==
Julia Hu is an only child and the daughter of Victoria Chen and James Hu. She attended North Hollywood High School's Highly Gifted Magnet (North Hollywood, California) graduating in 2002. Hu was a member of the 2001 championship National Science Bowl team, whose members included her future husband and Lark Health co-founder Jeff Zira.

Hu graduated from Stanford University with a BS and MS in environmental engineering and design thinking. Hu launched her entrepreneurial career before returning to school to pursue an MBA at MIT Sloan School of Management in to study more business strategies, but left midway to found Lark Health.

Hu dealt with an undiagnosed chronic condition for several decades; she managed her chronic pain and attacks through major changes in diet, exercise, stress and pain management. Hu’s personal experience struggling with chronic disease inspired her later interest in making compassionate healthcare accessible to all. Hu names Weili Dai, co-founder of Marvell Technology Group, as a mentor who supported her vision of Lark.

== Career ==
Hu was the founder and CEO of smart home startup EMOD. Her second venture into entrepreneurship was as a member of the founding team of Cleantech Open, which is a non-profit organization and now the world’s largest Cleantech incubator. Hu was an international marketing consultant for BOP renewables company D.light Design, which focuses on renewable solar energy.

Hu founded Lark Technologies in 2011 with the development of a wearable sleep monitor and an accompanying app that used artificial intelligence (AI)-based coaching to improve sleep. The company increased its coaching to include nutrition and physical activity and stopped producing hardware, and relaunched as an app in late 2015. Business Insider named Lark among the "10 Most Innovative App Companies of 2015" alongside Uber, Google Photos, Snapchat, and Slack, and Apple named Lark one of the "10 Best Apps of 2015" out of all apps in the app store.

Hu is a faculty member at Singularity University, Board Director at the Council for Diabetes Prevention and the Silicon Valley Leadership Group. She has advised Barack Obama, and has stated that her “proudest achievement was when Lark received recognition by the Centers for Disease Control and Prevention".

== Personal life ==
Hu moved to Silicon Valley in 2011 with Jeff Zira, whom she married on October 9, 2016, in Los Angeles, California.
