= Ernestine Fu =

American venture capital investor

Ernestine Fu Mak
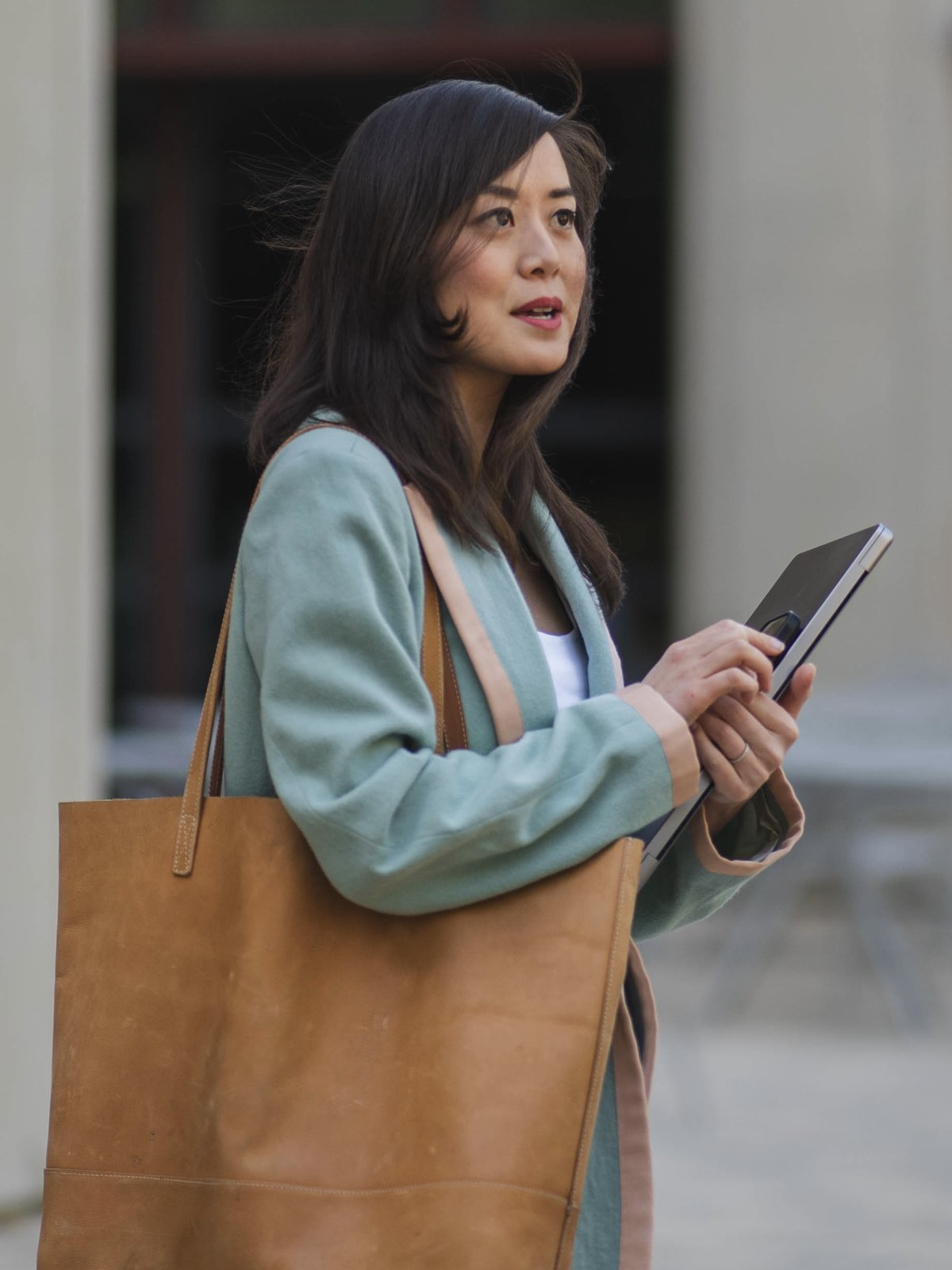
- Fu in 2024
- Born: April 30, 1992 (age 34); Los Angeles, California, U.S.
- Education: Stanford University (BS, MS, MBA, PhD)
- Occupations: Venture capitalist; author

Ernestine Fu Mak (born April 30, 1992) is an American venture capitalist, investor, and author.

== Early life and education ==
Fu was born in Los Angeles, California, where she attended North Hollywood High School's Highly Gifted Magnet program.

Fu graduated with her B.S., M.S., MBA, and Ph.D. from Stanford University.

== Career ==
Fu is an investment partner at Brave Capital. Inspired by her colleagues' government and national security backgrounds, particularly their work at the NSA and In-Q-Tel, she started her career at Alsop Louie Partners while still as an undergraduate at Stanford University and has since been a venture partner at the firm. She closed her first deal in her first two months at the firm, and was recognized for bringing a fresh face to venture capital as a young Asian-American woman.

She is frequently cited on the topic of autonomous vehicles. She has made investments in early-stage technology companies like Zoox (now a subsidiary of Amazon) and nuTonomy (now part of the Motional autonomous driving joint venture between Aptiv and Hyundai Motor Group). She completed her doctoral thesis on autonomous vehicles at Stanford University's Volkswagen Automotive Innovation Lab, and her research has received awards at academic conferences such as the ACM Conference on Human Factors in Computing Systems. She has been a director at Hyundai Motor Group.

Fu has been an advisor to DBS Bank. She helped launch the bank's venture debt program for financing startups and was the face of DBS BusinessClass, a program to foster entrepreneurship in Asia.

Fu has taught courses on the effects and applications of emerging technology as an adjunct professor and is co-director of the Frontier Technology Lab.

== Recognition ==
Forbes named her to its inaugural 30 Under 30 list; Vanity Fair named her to its Next Establishment list; and Business Insider named her to its Silicon Valley 100 list. Prior to including her on its 30 Under 30 list, Forbes featured her on the cover of its print magazine in the United States. She received the Kauffman Fellowship for venture capitalists and Eisenhower Fellowship for mid-career professionals.

She is also a Mensan.

== Selected publications ==
- Civic Work, Civic Lessons with former Stanford Law School Dean Thomas Ehrlich.
- Renewed Energy with John Weyant and Justin Bowersock.
