= Joshua Stangby =

American gridiron football player (born 1990)

Profile
- Position: Wide receiver

Personal information
- Born: September 24, 1990 (age 36); Los Angeles, California, U.S.
- Listed height: 5 ft 11 in (1.80 m)
- Listed weight: 185 lb (84 kg)

Career information
- High school: North Hollywood (Los Angeles)
- College: Ottawa (Kansas)
- NFL draft: 2015: undrafted

Career history
- Atlanta Falcons (2015)*; Portland Steel (2015)*; Indianapolis Colts (2015–2016)*; Ottawa Redblacks (2016–2017); Edmonton Eskimos (2019–2020)
- * Offseason or practice squad member only

Awards and highlights
- Grey Cup champion (2016)

Joshua Stangby (born September 24, 1990) is an American former professional football wide receiver. He played college football for the Ottawa Braves. He has been a member of the Atlanta Falcons and Indianapolis Colts of the National Football League (NFL), the Portland Steel of the Arena Football League (AFL), and the Ottawa Redblacks and Edmonton Eskimos of the Canadian Football League (CFL).

== Professional career ==
=== NFL and AFL ===
Stangby was signed by the Atlanta Falcons as an undrafted free agent on May 6, 2015 but was released four days later. Stangby signed a contract with the Portland Steel on December 11, 2015 after an open tryout with the team. He was signed by the Indianapolis Colts on December 22, 2015. On August 28, 2016, Stangby was waived by the Colts.

=== CFL ===
Stangby signed with the Ottawa Redblacks of the Canadian Football League (CFL) on October 11, 2016, near the end of the 2016 season. He was moved on and off the practice roster for the duration of the teams journey to the 104th Grey Cup game. Stangby made it onto the Redblacks 2017 season opening roster, and scored his first CFL touchdown on opening weekend against the Calgary Stampeders. Stangby finished his second year in the CFL with 41 receptions for 478 yards with 5 touchdowns in 13 games. Stangby was released by the Redblacks on April 3, 2018.

Stangby re-signed with the Edmonton Football Team on a contract extension through 2021 on December 26, 2020. He was released on June 28, 2021.
