= Scott Yancey =

American TV personality and businessman

- Born: Scott E. Yancey; July 9, 1969 (age 57); Los Angeles County, California, U.S.
- Occupations: CEO of Goliath Company; Real Estate Broker; Television personality
- Years active: 1994–present
- Television: Flipping Vegas
- Spouse: Amie Yancey (m. 2000)
- Website: scottyancey.com

Scott E. Yancey (born July 9, 1969) is a TV personality, businessman, real estate investor, and author. He is best known for his role on the A&E television series, Flipping Vegas, a modern reality TV show in which Scott and his wife, Amie Yancey purchase and repair dilapidated homes in the Las Vegas Valley, and attempt to flip them for profit.

== Early life ==
Yancey was born on July 9, 1969, in Los Angeles County, California, and raised in Studio City, California, where he attended North Hollywood High School.

== Personal life ==
Yancey married his future Flipping Vegas costar, Amie, on January 26, 2000. Yancey has attention deficit hyperactivity disorder. As of 2014, the couple had a pet dog, a dachshund named Tallulah.

== Career ==
=== Real estate ===
Yancey made his first real estate deal at the age of 14, when he received an insurance settlement of $30,000, which he used to purchase the 2nd deed of trust for a home mortgage as an investment with a 14% interest rate.

While enrolled in college, Yancey was hired to be a runner by Walter J. Plumb III, a real estate attorney and investor. Yancey continued to work with Plumb, assisting in multiple real estate transactions, such as the purchase of a 40-unit apartment complex and converting it to condos along with assembling dozens of land deals and subdividing the land into over 3000 lots. Now working independently of Plumb, Yancey began developing department stores in Las Vegas, Provo, Utah, and Tempe, Arizona.

After selling his department stores and choosing to return to his real estate roots, Yancey relocated to Las Vegas in 1994. In 2008, Yancey founded the Las Vegas-based Goliath Company, a real estate brokerage and investment firm. Goliath Company focuses on investment properties, the buy-and-hold approach, and finding land to entitle and subdivide by selling to large private companies, which they have managed to do for a few thousand lots.

=== Flipping Vegas ===
In 2010, Yancey and Lovable Scoundrels Productions created the television series Flipping Vegas. A&E originally premiered the series on June 18, 2011. In addition to starring in the show, Yancey also served as an executive producer. The show concluded its fifth season on September 27, 2014.

=== Yancey Events ===
The Yanceys created Yancey Events as a way to help others learn about investing in real estate. Using the Yanceys' stardom from Flipping Vegas, coupled with the knowledge and experience they have gained from years in the business, Yancey Events employs salespeople who travel across the United States and sell educational seminars on how to properly invest in real estate. Many participants of the events have criticized them as being a scam.

In September 2020, Yancey, along with Dean Graziosi, "who is a self-described New York Times best-selling author, entrepreneur, and investor", was added as a defendant to a complaint filed by the FTC. "Since 2012, the FTC says, they’ve each earned about $10 million as the two celebrities that Nudge primarily used to market and give credibility to its real estate training scheme. Among other things, Graziosi and Yancey have appeared in infomercials and direct mailings that encouraged people to attend free events designed to help sell training and coaching packages, often through telemarketing, that cost thousands of dollars. According to the proposed amended complaint, which alleges the celebrities assisted with Nudge’s telemarketing operation, the two celebrities knew about numerous complaints describing how Nudge had swindled people, and they strategized about ways to counteract the negative online reviews – including discussions about posting fake positive reviews to Graziosi’s page on Trustpilot and to Yancey’s Yelp profile."

== Trade Commission lawsuit ==
Yancey, along with Dean Graziosi, have been named in a lawsuit by the Federal Trade Commission and Utah Department of Consumer Affairs, in Case No. 2:19-cv-00867-DBB-DAO (D. Utah Jul. 26, 2021), relating to their involvement with Nudge, LLC. On April 24, 2023, pursuant to a settlement agreement between Scott Yancey and the FTC, the Judge entered a judgment against Yancey in the amount of $4,577,409: the entire judgment amount however was suspended with Yancey paying Four Hundred and $450,000 provided that Yancey's declarations as to his limited financial condition did not prove to be false. Additionally, the same judgment provided that "The facts alleged in the Complaint [against Yancey] will be taken as true, without further proof."

== Charity ==
In one episode of Flipping Vegas, the Yanceys donated a home to a wounded veteran.

== Publications ==
Yancey has published two books:

- Go Time (2012), a 250-page book inspired by people who taught Yancey about real estate.
- Flipping Your Way to Real Estate Profits (2015), a 221-page book offering advice to financially challenged investors on how to make profits beyond flipping houses.
