= Augustus F. Hawkins High School =

Augustus Hawkins High School

Location
- 825 W. 60th St, Los Angeles, California 90044; 33.9861560°N 118.2880520°W

Information
- Type: Public
- Established: 2012; 14 years ago
- Locale: City, Large
- School district: Los Angeles Unified School District
- NCES District ID: 0622710
- NCES School ID: 062271013065
- Principal: Lester Malta
- Teaching staff: 57.17 (on an FTE basis)
- Grades: 9–12
- Enrollment: 1,122 (2024–25)
  - Male: 584
  - Female: 538
- Student to teacher ratio: 19.63
- Colors: hunter green, black, & white
- Athletics: Football, Girls and Boys Basketball, Girls and Boys Volleyball, Girls and Boys Soccer, Track and Field, and Softball, Marching Band
- Mascot: Hawk
- Website: hawkinshs.lausd.org

Hawkins High School is part of the largest school construction building program in the history of Los Angeles Unified School District. The school consists of three Small Learning Communities (CHAS, RISE, and C:\DAGS). This school opened in the year of 2012 with the first graduating class in 2014.

Augustus Hawkins High School is the first school in South Los Angeles to use Restorative Justice. Hawkins High School is partnered with many organizations and schools such as USC, UCLA, St. John's Medical Clinic, Kaiser Permanente, UMMA Clinic, YMCA, and Los Angeles Child Guidance Clinic.

== Name ==
The school was named after Augustus Freeman (Gus) Hawkins, a Watts political leader, 12-term Assemblyman, and California's first African American elected to the United States Congress.

== Architecture firm ==
CSDA Design Group completed this project for LAUSD (Los Angeles Unified School District) in 2012.

== Small learning communities ==
=== Critical Design and Gaming School ===
The Critical Design and Gaming School, C:\DAGS for short, is School A on the Augustus F. Hawkins High School Campus. C:\DAGS is a school based on Designing and Gaming. In C:\DAGS students are making a connection between Games and general education Classes in High School such as Math, Chemistry, and Computers. On Saturday February 15, 2014, 4 teams from C:\DAGS competed for the 20th Annual Popsicle Stick Bridge Competition at CSUN

=== Community Health Advocates School ===
The Community Health Advocates School, CHAS for short, is School B on the Augustus F. Hawkins High School Campus. "CHAS" is a school that stands on the value of health and advocacy around the South LA community. On September 23, members of the first CHAS Internship and Graduating class presented their research and stories at the Cognitive-Behavioral Intervention for Trauma in Schools (CBITS) Conference at the RAND Headquarters in Santa Monica, California.

=== Responsible Indigenous Social Entrepreneurship School ===
The Responsible Indigenous Social Entrepreneurship School, RISE for short, is School C on the Augustus F. Hawkins High School Campus. "RISE" is a school about Entrepreneurship and the value of owning a business in the Los Angeles County.

== Athletics ==
The Schools mascot is the Red-Tailed Hawk named due to the Hawk's original habitat of South Los Angeles. Teams play in Div. I of the CIF Los Angeles City Section.
