= CIF Los Angeles City Section =

American high school athletics governing body

- Abbreviation: CIF-LA
- Formation: 1935
- Type: NPO
- Legal status: Association
- Purpose: Athletic/Educational
- Headquarters: 8401 Arleta Avenue; Sun Valley, CA 91352
- Region served: Los Angeles Unified School District
- Official language: English
- Commissioner: John Aguirre
- Parent organization: California Interscholastic Federation
- Website: http://www.cif-la.org/

The CIF Los Angeles City Section (CIF-LA) is the governing body of high school athletics for public schools in the city of Los Angeles and some surrounding communities. All of these schools were once associated with the Los Angeles Unified School District. It is one of ten sections that constitute the California Interscholastic Federation (CIF).

== History ==
Official governance for high school sports in this area began in 1913, when the Southern California Interscholastic Athletic Council (SCIAC) was formed. Previous to that, some individual leagues dated back to the 1890s. The High School Athletic Association of Southern California was formed in 1904 to create a championship in the sport of track and field, precipitating the need for administering all sports. In 1914, the name was changed to the Southern Section also releasing the acronym SCIAC which was taken locally by the Southern California Intercollegiate Athletic Conference the following year. In 1917, the CIF took over administering sports statewide and the Southern Section became a part of it. The Southern Section was a behemoth, the largest section covering the most populated southern half of the state. In 1935, the Los Angeles Unified School District split from the section, forming their own Los Angeles City Section. Private schools within the city limits remained in the Southern Section. Since the advent of charter schools in the Los Angeles area, several high schools are no longer under the direct governance of LAUSD, but remain with the historical leagues and the Los Angeles City Section.

== Sports ==
CIF-Los Angeles City Section sponsors the following sports:

=== Fall Season ===
- High School Girls Flag Football
- High School Football
- Cross Country (co-ed)
- Volleyball (Girls)
- Tennis (Girls)
- Water Polo (Boys)
- Golf (Girls)
- Field Hockey

=== Winter Season ===
- Basketball
- Soccer
- Water Polo (Girls)
- Wrestling

=== Spring Season ===
- Baseball
- Golf (boys)
- Softball
- Swimming & Diving (Co-ed)
- Tennis (Boys)
- Track & Field (Co-ed)
- Volleyball (Boys)

== Football leagues ==
The following is the 2018–2022 league alignment for football.

=== Coastal Region ===
==== Coliseum ====
- Crenshaw High School
- Dorsey High School
- Fremont High School
- Hawkins High School
- Locke High School
- View Park Preparatory High School
- King Drew Magnet High School

==== Exposition ====
- Angelou Community High School
- Jefferson High School
- Manual Arts High School
- Rivera Learning Complex
- Santee Education Complex
- Washington Preparatory High School
- West Adams Preparatory High School

==== Marine ====
- Banning High School
- Carson High School
- Gardena High School
- Narbonne High School
- San Pedro High School

==== Metro ====
- Jordan High School
- Los Angeles High School
- Maywood Center for Enriched Studies
- Rancho Dominguez Preparatory School
- Roybal Learning Center
- Sotomayor Learning Academies

==== Western ====
- Fairfax High School
- Hamilton High School
- Palisades Charter High School
- University High School
- Venice High School
- Westchester Enriched Sciences Magnets
- Los Angeles Center for Enriched Studies (LACES)

=== Eastern Region ===
==== Central ====
- Belmont High School
- Bernstein High School
- Contreras Learning Complex
- Hollywood High School
- Marquez High School
- Mendez High School

==== Eastern ====
- Bell High School
- Garfield High School
- Huntington Park High School
- Legacy High School Complex
- Roosevelt High School
- South East High School
- South Gate High School

==== Northern ====
- Eagle Rock High School
- Franklin High School
- Lincoln High School
- Marshall High School
- Torres High School
- Wilson High School

=== Valley Region ===
==== East Valley ====
- Arleta High School
- César Chávez Learning Academies
- East Valley High School
- Grant High School
- Monroe High School
- North Hollywood High School
- Polytechnic High School
- Verdugo Hills High School

==== Valley Mission ====
- Canoga Park High School
- Kennedy High School
- Panorama High School
- Reseda Charter High School
- San Fernando High School
- Sylmar High School
- Van Nuys High School

==== West Valley ====
- Birmingham High School
- Chatsworth High School
- Cleveland High School
- El Camino Real High School
- Granada Hills Charter High School
- Taft High School
