= Lark Health =

American digital health company

- Company type: Private
- Industry: Health
- Founded: 2011
- Founder: Julia Hu and Jeff Zira
- Headquarters: Mountain View, California, United States
- Area served: Worldwide
- Products: Health apps
- Website: www.lark.com

Lark Health is an American digital health company based in Mountain View, California. It provides a 24/7 nursing platform for chronic conditions, powered by artificial intelligence (AI) and has a text-messaging type interface. Lark also provides AI nurses for type 2 diabetes care, hypertension care, tobacco cessation, stress management, obesity, and more for 1.5 million patients.

Lark is notable for being preloaded on all Samsung Galaxy S5 phones by 2014.

== History ==
Lark was founded by Julia Hu and Jeff Zira. It first produced a sleep health monitor worn on a person's wrist. It was designed to wake up the individual wearing the device without disturbing anyone else who might be sleeping nearby. The product was soon sold in all Apple stores globally.

Lark eventually focused more on artificial intelligence and less on hardware. By 2014, Lark was preloaded on all Samsung Galaxy S5 phones.

The Lark apps focus on common chronic conditions such as obesity, diabetes prevention, diabetes, and hypertension. Lark Diabetes Prevention Program (DPP) is officially recognized by the Centers for Disease Control and Prevention (CDC) as an online DPP.

Lark's efficacy has been evaluated by a study published in the Journal of Medical Internet Research Diabetes,

== Products and services ==
Lark has specialized health plans focusing on patients with diabetes, hypertension, prediabetes or at high risk for type 2 diabetes, and overall health. Lark's services are delivered and automatically syncs with certain bluetooth-enabled health monitors devices such as home blood pressure monitors, glucometers, activity trackers, and body weight scales. Some programs allow for both the app and one or more connected devices to be used.
