= Aaron Mitchell (American football) =

American football player (born 1956)

No. 34, 45
- Position: Cornerback

Personal information
- Born: December 15, 1956 (age 69); Los Angeles, California, U.S.
- Listed height: 6 ft 1 in (1.85 m)
- Listed weight: 196 lb (89 kg)

Career information
- High school: North Hollywood (Los Angeles)
- College: UNLV
- NFL draft: 1979: 2nd round, 55th overall pick

Career history
- Dallas Cowboys (1979–1980); Tampa Bay Buccaneers (1981); Arizona Wranglers (1983); Los Angeles Express (1984)

Career NFL statistics
- Games played / started: 44 / 16
- Interceptions: 4
- Fumble recoveries: 1
- Stats at Pro Football Reference

Aaron Templeton Mitchell, Jr. (born December 15, 1956) is an American former professional football player who was a cornerback in the National Football League (NFL) for the Dallas Cowboys and Tampa Bay Buccaneers. He played college football for the UNLV Rebels.

== Early life ==
Mitchell attended North Hollywood High School, before moving on to College of the Canyons for two years.

He transferred to the University of Nevada, Las Vegas, where he was the starter at right cornerback for the following two years. As a senior, he registered 6 interceptions and 12 passes defensed.

In 1989, he was inducted into the UNLV Athletics Hall of Fame.

== Professional career ==
=== Dallas Cowboys ===
The Dallas Cowboys liked Mitchell's athletic ability and selected him in the second round (55th overall) of the 1979 NFL draft. In 1980, he became the starter at right cornerback, replacing Aaron Kyle and recording 3 interceptions. In 1981, he was passed on the depth chart by Dennis Thurman and was traded to the Tampa Bay Buccaneers in exchange for an eleventh draft choice (#295-George Thompson).

=== Tampa Bay Buccaneers ===
The Buccaneers moved him to free safety to take advantage of his aggressive hitting and to limit his exposure in coverage. He was placed on injured reserve list for the last two games of the season, after suffering a collapsed lung. He was released before the start of the 1982 season.

=== Arizona Wranglers ===
In 1983, he signed with the Arizona Wranglers of the USFL.

=== Los Angeles Express ===
In 1984, he played with the Los Angeles Express of the USFL, until announcing his retirement in 1985.

== Personal life ==
He is currently a financial adviser.
