= Barbara S. Brogliatti =

American businesswoman

- Born: January 8, 1946; San Fernando Valley, California
- Died: June 21, 2015 (aged 69); Napa Valley, California
- Education: North Hollywood High School; University of California, Los Angeles
- Employer: Warner Bros.

Barbara S. Brogliatti (January 8, 1946 – June 21, 2015) was an American publicity, public relations and marketing executive, who spent 40 years working in the entertainment industry.

== Early life and education ==
Brogliatti was born and raised in Southern California’s San Fernando Valley. She attended North Hollywood High School and University of California, Los Angeles, graduating in 1968 with a degree in Social Sciences for Elementary Education.

== Career ==
Brogliatti began her career in public relations shortly after graduating from UCLA, as an assistant in the publicity department of the CBS Television Network. She rose through the CBS publicity ranks and was then tapped by producer Norman Lear to create and head publicity operations for his fast-growing companies (Tandem Productions, TAT Communications and ELP Communications). Eleven years later, when Lear sold his companies, Brogliatti joined Lorimar as the head of Corporate Communications, Public Affairs and Investor Relations.

When Warner Communications bought Lorimar in 1989, Brogliatti left to form her own public relations and marketing firm—The Brogliatti Company—handling such clients as Norman Lear, Haim Saban, Jean Stapleton and Barbara Walters. At the end of 1990, Brogliatti returned to Warner Bros. to head television publicity, promotion and advertising. A few years later, she established Warner Bros.’ first-ever Worldwide Corporate Communications department and took oversight of corporate communications studio-wide, including Warner Bros. Pictures, Warner Bros. Television, Warner Home Video, Telepictures Productions, Warner Bros. Consumer Products, DC Comics and Warner Bros. Animation.

In addition to her Studio responsibilities, Brogliatti served as a leader on industry-wide issues and regulatory matters, including serving as chairman of the MPAA’s (Motion Picture Association of America) Anti-Piracy PR/educational task force, as chief press strategist and spokesperson for the Coalition for the Repeal of the Financial Interest & Syndication Rule, and as the public relations strategist and spokesperson for the AMPTP (Alliance of Motion Picture and Television Producers, the primary trade association and collective bargaining representative for all the studios, networks and 350 independent producers) for 25 years.

She left her role of Executive Vice President and Chief Communications Officer at Warner Bros. in 2005, after nearly 20 years at the Studio, and 40 years in the entertainment industry, to pursue philanthropy, teaching, travel and a more agreeable pace of life in Napa Valley, CA.

She served as a pro bono consultant, specializing in PR strategy, positioning and branding of NPOs (non-profit organizations) as well as serving as a member of the Board of Governors, Chapman University; Grantor/Creator of Spencer+Colton Teacher Grants (Napa Valley Education Foundation); and a member of UCLA Centennial Campaign Committee. Her pro bono consultancies coupled with Board positions include Napa Valley Performing Arts Center at Lincoln Theater, the Read It Loud! Foundation, and MEND (Los Angeles poverty-relief organization). She also served as a guest lecturer and was an adjunct professor of communications at Bradley University.

== Personal life ==
Brogliatti was married to her husband, Ray Brogliatti, for 44 years. Barbara spent the last years of her life in Napa Valley, California where she died following a lengthy battle with cancer on June 21, 2015
