= Doug Dunlap =

Doug Dunlap is a long-time traffic reporter in Los Angeles, California. Currently heard on KFWB, he has been reporting traffic for over twenty years on other Los Angeles stations such as KABC, KNX, KRTH, KMPC, KLAC and KZLA among others.

Dunlap's radio career began at KFOX in Redondo Beach, California in 1980. Other radio personalities were also getting their start there at the same time including long time KOST and KABC newscaster Sharon Dale, disc jockey Kenny Noble and fellow traffic reporter Rhonda Kramer who, for many years, has been the number one traffic voice on KFWB in Los Angeles.

Dunlap and Richard Turnage handled traffic responsibilities for KFWB and the Los Angeles Dodgers at the L.A. Dodgers Transportation Center in 2007. Dunlap and long-time traffic reporter for KABC, Captain Jorge Jarrin, now handle those responsibilities for KABC radio. Capatain Jorge is the son of the Dodgers' Baseball Hall of Fame broadcaster Jaime Jarrín.

Dunlap is also a pianist. He can be heard around Southern California accompanying singers who perform the "Great American Songbook" at various restaurants and clubs.

He is married and lives in Santa Clarita, California.

He is also founder and host of the Doug-O-Rama sporting events held in the Northern San Fernando Valley each Fall and Winter.
