= Flipping Vegas =

American house flipping TV show

- Genre: Reality
- Starring: Scott Yancey; Amie Yancey
- Country of origin: United States
- Original language: English
- No. of seasons: 5
- No. of episodes: 41

Production
- Executive producers: Jon Kroll; Chris Kobin; Michael Matsumoto; Scott Yancey; John Platt
- Running time: 42 minutes
- Production company: Loveable Scoundrels Productions

Original release
- Network: A&E; FYI
- Release: June 18, 2011 – September 27, 2014

Flipping Vegas is an American reality television series on A&E in the United States. The series premiered on June 18, 2011, and ran through September 2014. It features Scott Yancey and his wife Amie Yancey with realtors from their brokerage Goliath Company as they buy, fix and flip houses in Las Vegas, Nevada. Originally airing on Saturday mornings, A&E moved the show to Saturday evenings at the beginning of Season three. The show was moved back to Saturday afternoons for the final eight episodes. FYI and A&E split up season 3's 23 episodes to make seasons 4 and 5 on FYI. A&E lists it as only 3 seasons.

After the success of Flipping Vegas, similar shows from other cities such as Flipping Boston and Flipping Miami premiered in 2012 and 2013.

== Overview ==
Scott Yancey and his wife, interior designer Amie Yancey, purchase low-priced houses in the Las Vegas Valley through their real estate brokerage, Goliath Company. The houses are then renovated with a low budget and a quick schedule in order to be sold as soon as possible, a process known as flipping.

Many of the houses featured on the series are presented as having been vandalized or unkept by the previous tenants, and thus are in need of clean-up or expensive repairs. Scott desires to spend as little money as possible on each house to achieve a maximum profit. However, Amie is passionate about her design choices and frequently makes expensive purchases on upgrades that are not budgeted, and often does so without informing Scott, which upsets him. Scott usually does not agree with Amie's belief that such upgrades help to sell a house.

In some episodes, Scott has a project manager oversee renovations for him. Because of various types of delays, workers typically struggle to get each house complete in time for an open house event, during which one of Scott's real estate agents gives tours of the property to potential buyers. Throughout each episode, Scott, Amie, and others speak to the viewer through interview clips to provide information and opinions about each other and about the property featured in that episode.

== Cast ==
- Scott Yancey
- Amie Yancey
- Michelle, the manager at Walker Zanger, a business from which Amie regularly chooses tiles and countertops for each house.
- Andrew Cartwright, a YouTuber, Real Estate Developer, and a friend, partnered up with Scott Yancey for the largest flip in Flipping Vegas titled Dream House (season 1, episode 7)

=== Project managers ===
- Baldemar Rivera (season 1–2)
- Dino (season 1)
- Darryll (season 2 episode 1, episode 6)
- Larry (season 2–5)

=== Real estate agents ===
- Ashley
- Heather Stone
- Gady Medrano
- Rexalynn Martinez Walberg
- Michelle

== Production ==
Regarding the show's origin, Scott Yancey said: "I'm from the Hollywood area originally, and I was talking with some buddies who are in the industry. I was telling them how I had to pull my Glock out on some homeless guys who came at me with needles in one of the houses that was all boarded up. They're like, 'Man, you need your own reality show. We'll make it like a commercial for your website or something.' So I paid their expenses, and they gave it to another friend of ours, who gave it to a guy who worked at Lionsgate."

The series filmed its pilot in 2009, under the working title of Last House Standing. The second season concluded filming in April 2012. As of November 2013, the show was filming its fifth season. Approximately 120 to 140 hours of footage was shot for each episode, which was then edited down to 43 minutes. Scott Yancey said, "The houses that are the worst to buy are the ones we save for TV because we know there's a great storyline with it".

Regarding the biggest misconception that viewers may have about the show, Scott Yancey said, "What the people see is us stressed in a house on an episode. What they don't see is us doing five others at the same time. [...] The TV show usually edits in the drama. They don't see that an hour from now, we're gonna be holding hands walking our dog somewhere. They edit it in a way that's obviously going to be most entertaining. They don't ever show me say 'thank you, good job' to somebody or show us going to a restaurant at night or in the summer on a beach." Amie Yancey said, "The main thing is that in TV land, they speed everything up. They [the viewers] think, 'Oh, wow, it's a breeze. They come in, and it's done.' It takes a long time to put them together, to pick out the fit and finish and work on the quality. They only see a glimpse of it."

== Legal issues ==
Scott Yancey has been named as one of the defendants in an active Federal Trade Commission and Utah Division of Consumer Protection lawsuit against Nudge, LLC. The complaint alleges that Yancey used the notoriety and celebrity status gained from Flipping Vegas to entice consumers into various real-estate flipping courses and potential real estate purchase schemes that fleeced consumers out of $400 million. Yancey is reported to have received at least $10 million from Nudge, LLC beginning the year after Flipping Vegas began airing.

== Episodes ==
Season 3 was split into Seasons 4 and 5 on FYI.

Season	Episodes	Premiere	Finale
1	8	August 21, 2010	July 30, 2011
2	10	December 8, 2012	February 16, 2013
3	8	November 2, 2013	December 14, 2013
4	7	March 1, 2014	April 12, 2014
5	8	August 9, 2014	September 27, 2014

=== Season 1 (2010-11) ===
No. overall	No. in season	Title	Original release date
1	1	"Pilot"	August 21, 2010
Scott Yancey and his wife, interior designer Amie Yancey, work with project manager Baldemar Rivera to flip a dilapidated house. Simultaneously, one of Scott's rental properties suffers fire damage. Scott enlists Baldemar to repair the fire-damaged house. Dealing with problems at both houses, Baldemar struggles to finish them on time for Scott.
2	2	"Flood House"	June 18, 2011
Without seeing it first, Scott purchases a house with remediated floor damage in a guard-gated community for $225,000, six times the amount he usually pays for a house. Scott and his real estate agent, Heather Stone, tour the house and are surprised to find that the flood damage is worse than they initially believed, as much of the drywall has been removed. Scott initially only plans to spend $20,000 on renovations, but discovers that the house is infested with black mold, which is then removed in a lengthy and expensive process. To discuss design ideas, Scott and Amie tour the house with Michelle and Chad from Walker Zanger, the business from which they usually purchase their countertops and flooring. Scott disagrees with Amie's expensive design ideas. Scott hires a new, cheaper contractor named Dino, after Baldemar declines to decrease his price to work on the house. Scott has the various crew members work overtime to get the house finished in time for the open house, but he and Amie are upset to find that Dino's crew failed to correct minor defects throughout the house. After $45,000 in renovations, Heather sells it for $349,900.
3	3	"Hot Tub House"	June 25, 2011
Scott's new real estate agent, Ashley, purchases an 1,884-square-foot house for him at a cost of $110,000. When Scott and Ashley tour the house, he is disappointed to see that it is located near a noisy freeway. They enter and discover the house to be filthy. In the backyard, they find a hot tub full of black water, dog feces, and a doll. Scott hopes to keep renovations at $10,000, and hires a new contractor named Mike. Later, Ashley arrives at the house while Scott is showing it to Amie, who becomes jealous of Ashley's physical appearance. Amie takes Scott outside for a private conversation and questions him on why he always hires women as real estate agents. Later, Scott fires Mike after his workers dispose of wood flooring that Scott had hoped to re-use. Scott is later informed that the hot tub cannot be salvaged without receiving $3,000 in repairs, so he has it removed instead. While expanding a closet that seems too small, a safe is discovered to be hidden behind a wall. Various unsuccessful attempts are made to open the safe, including Scott pushing it out of a second-story window. With no general contractor, Amie must supervise ongoing work at the house. Amie purchases an expensive slab of granite counter top that was not in Scott's budget. When the workers accidentally drop the granite slab, Amie must purchase a cheaper, second slab of granite, which angers Scott when he finds out. Carpets and paint are late in being added, and the workers struggle to complete the home on time for the open house. A total of $17,500 is spent on renovations. Ashley sells the house for $149,900, marking her first sale for Goliath Company. Afterwards, Scott and Amie take the safe out to the desert, where it is placed atop a container of Tannerite. From a safe distance, Scott shoots the container with a sniper rifle to explode the safe. Inside, they discover silver bars and money.
4	4	"Twins House"	July 2, 2011
Scott wants to purchase higher-priced houses, but his real estate agent, Aaron, informs him that they are continually being outbid by twin brothers named Phil and Tom, who are the former owners of a local chain of bars named PT's Pub. Scott and the twins agree to work together on a filthy, unfinished house that the brothers purchased for $237,000. With Baldemar as the project manager, Scott hopes to keep renovation costs at $25,000. However, the twins have doubts about Baldemar's ability to get the job done, so they bring in their own crew to clean up the house. When Baldemar and his crew arrive to work on the house, he is disappointed to find that most of the assigned work has already been done by the twins' crew. Baldemar works on the house's drywall, but the twins are disappointed with his poor work, so they have the drywall redone. Scott promises Baldemar that he will have more work to do on the house; Baldemar is upset when he arrives at the house again and sees that his crew is not needed. Baldemar quits as Scott's project manager and contractor after nearly three years of working for him. Amie and the twins argue about whose finishing touches will be added to the house. To settle the dispute, Scott, Amie and the twins shoot bullseye targets at an indoor shooting range, with Scott and Amie emerging as the winners. Renovations cost $35,250. Scott has his new real estate agent, Gady Medrano, sell the house for $310,000.
5	5	"Ridge House"	July 9, 2011
Scott purchases a 2,500-square-foot five-bedroom four-bathroom house at Lake Las Vegas, with views of the Las Vegas Strip, for $190,000. Scott hopes to keep renovation costs at $25,000, but Amie disagrees with keeping the house's outdated interior. Scott plans to square out an arched walkway, while keeping an arched non-glass window in the house; squaring out both arches is not within his budget. A worker who speaks little English squares out both arches, and turns the window into a walkway, angering Scott. Pink tiling, a urinal, and a bidet are removed from one of the bathrooms. Chad, Scott's tile installer, is given three days to complete an extensive amount of tile work. Scott's workers flee the house when a snake slithers inside, although it is later removed by Scott. With 18 hours left before the open house, Scott is upset to find that Chad has yet to install counter tops. The counter top slabs are rushed into fabrication. Chad and several workers are at the house late into the night installing the counter tops, but they face some difficulty because of an uneven kitchen island and a slab that is slightly too large, which requires additional cutting to fit. The next morning, Scott has his team rush to complete their work, without informing them that he has already delayed the open house until the next day, thus forcing the team to work faster. After $45,000 in renovations, Heather sells the house for $315,000.
6	6	"Country Club House"	July 16, 2011
7	7	"Dream House"	July 23, 2011
Scott teams up with local real estate investor Andrew Cartwright to complete an unfinished 12,000 square-foot mansion that Andrew owns in MacDonald Highlands. Andrew has already invested $2 million into the mansion, which has sat vacant for years and needs an additional $1 million to be completed. Scott hires Dino to be project manager for the mansion, with a plan to have it completed in nine weeks. Scott becomes upset at Dino for leaving the roof unfinished with an upcoming storm approaching, although Dino manages to get it completed before any water damage is done. Scott and Amie have a disagreement with Andrew's girlfriend, Frances, who has a personal preference for cream-colored cabinets being used in the house. Scott and Amie insist on picking cabinets with mass appeal. When Scott and Andrew discover multiple drywall mistakes – including bowed walls – they wonder if Dino is capable of working on such a large property. That night, Andrew and Scott hold a meeting with Dino, who assures them that he will work better. The next day, Scott and Andrew are upset that Dino has not returned from a four-hour lunch break; they hire a dry-wall expert to fix Dino's mistakes. Andrew later gets mad at Dino after discovering that the budget for the house has gone over by 25 percent ($250,000). Dino says that the additional expenses have come from the owners, not him. Scott later concludes that Andrew and Frances have made purchases for the house that were more expensive than what the budget allowed. Scott and Amie are upset that Andrew allowed Frances to order the cream-colored cabinets, although they later concede that the cabinets look nice. Renovations are concluded at a cost of $1.3 million, which includes a down-sloped driveway that needed to be excavated three times. Scott has all of his real estate agents show up for the open house, including Heather, Gady, and Rexalynn. The house is sold for $4 million.
8	8	"Pink Door/Mouse House"	July 30, 2011
Scott purchases a house with a pink garage door for $68,000, and has Dino begin work on the home. Simultaneously, Scott teams up with Phil and Tom to flip a filthy house that is infested with mice, purchased for $48,500. The Mouse House suffers what ultimately turns out to be a minor water leak. Gady and Heather are stressed out when Scott, on short notice, reveals his plans for a same-day double open house. Permanently dirty windows must be replaced at the Pink Door house, while Scott and the twins later discover that the $2,000 worth of kitchen appliances have been stolen from Mouse House because an alarm was not installed. To get a break from the job and the stress, Scott and Amie take their all-terrain vehicles out to the desert to ride them. Meanwhile, Dino is forced to have the entire Pink Door house rewired to replace bad wiring. Later, one of Dino's crew members accidentally backs into the pink garage door with a pick-up truck. Scott, who had planned to repaint the garage door, must now replace it instead. A brown garage door is installed. Meanwhile, the twins remove the mice from Mouse House. The Pink Door house receives $14,500 in renovations, and is sold by Heather for $117,000. Mouse House receives $23,000 in renovations, and is sold by Gady for $99,000.

=== Season 2 (2012-13) ===
No. overall	No. in season	Title	Original release date
9	1	"Red Rock House"	December 8, 2012
Scott purchases a large house located in Summerlin's Red Rock Country Club for $418,000. When Scott and Heather tour the house, they are surprised to find it in good condition and nearly finished. Scott initially hopes to keep renovations at $15,000, but Amie wants to replace the house's outdated design. Scott agrees to let Amie completely redo the kitchen and bathrooms, but declines to let her get a new stair railing, as he plans to simply stain the current railing. Scott rehires his former project manager, Baldemar, to work on the house. While Scott is away, Amie uses Baldemar's chainsaw to destroy the spindles of the stair railing, forcing Scott to replace the entire railing. When Amie views the newly finished railing, she is upset to see that the new wrought iron spindles are cracked and dented. Scott is upset that the entire railing must be replaced again. While Scott is giving commentary about the house, he tells the film crew to stop shooting as he is not feeling well. While shopping for tiles, Amie receives a phone call informing her that Scott has been admitted to an emergency room for chest pains, which he has been experiencing in recent days as a result of stress from the house. Scott briefly passes out, and winds up staying at the hospital overnight before ultimately making a full recovery. After $115,000 in renovations, Heather sells the house for $679,900.
10	2	"Haunted House"	December 15, 2012
Scott purchases a three-bedroom two-and-a-half-bathroom house in northwest Las Vegas for $87,500. Scott warns Amie, a believer in ghosts, that the house is rumored to be haunted after its previous owner died there under "weird circumstances." They enter and discover that the living room walls are partially covered with red paint and that the ceiling has been burned. They also find bones in the kitchen, an upstairs bedroom with evil messages written in a foreign language, and cremated ashes in the living room. Scott speculates that the house was merely vandalized by local children on drugs as a Halloween prank, and says that he purchases so many houses each week, that he cannot tour them all before he buys them. Scott plans to spend $8,000 to renovate the house. Workers remove the living-room carpet and discover a large pentagram on the concrete slab underneath. When the painter refuses to paint over the bedroom walls with the evil writings out of fear that he will be cursed by the devil, Scott demonstrates to the painter that he can paint over the words without suffering any consequences. Amie is worried that they will have difficulty selling the house because of negative energy associated with it, so she hires Madame Barr, a local medium, to cleanse the house. Madame Barr informs Amie that animal sacrifices took place inside the house and that it is inhabited by a poltergeist, which further worries Scott's workers. Scott arrives at the house during Madame Barr's visit, and forces Amie to make her leave to avoid scaring the workers and to keep progress moving on the house. A day and a half before the open house, there is still a lot of work needed on the house, and the workers refuse to stay late because of fears that the house is haunted. Scott has Amie bring Madame Barr back to the house, so she can cleanse the house by walking through it while chanting. Madame Barr informs them that the spirit has left the house through an open window. A $1,000 wall is added to the house's upstairs loft to make it a fourth bedroom, adding $15,000 to the house's value. A total of $24,000 is put into renovations. Rexalynn, Scott's newest real estate agent who used to work with Amie at a different real estate company, sells the house for $150,500.
11	3	"Grow House"	December 22, 2012
Scott purchases 1,400-square-foot house for $86,000. The house had previously been used as a grow house for the growth of marijuana, until it was raided by the Federal Bureau of Investigation (FBI) and left vacant. Scott hopes to keep renovations at $10,000, and hires a new project manager, Darryll, to oversee renovations. An HVAC repairman discovers a marijuana plant in the attic, but Scott declines to contact the police, as he believes that will only slow down progress on the house. Instead, Scott plans to contact his lawyer on how to proceed. Scott becomes upset at Darryll when power is briefly shut off at the house, preventing workers from continuing with the renovations. More marijuana is discovered at the house, inside a plastic bag. Scott contacts his lawyer, who advises him not to touch the marijuana until it can be determined whether the FBI's case is still ongoing, as the drugs could be considered evidence in the case. Gady arrives on the morning of the open house and is worried that it will not be complete on time, with only a few hours left to install carpets throughout the house. Renovations are finished on time, at a cost of $11,500, but Gady is forced to hold the open house with the marijuana plant still in the attic. Despite one potential buyer noticing a "strange" odor coming from one of the vents, Gady is able to sell the house for $121,000. Afterwards, Scott finds out that the FBI case is closed and that he must destroy the marijuana. Scott, Amie and Gady burn the marijuana outdoors and become hungry after inhaling it.
12	4	"Ugly Coyote House"	January 5, 2013
Scott purchases an unfinished house on the outskirts of Lake Las Vegas for $41,000, and discovers that the area is inhabited by coyotes. Scott hopes to keep renovations at $20,000. Because the house is an hour away from where Scott lives, he hires a project manager, Larry, to oversee the renovations. Trash and other items from the previous construction workers are removed. Scott's workers discover a small hole in a wall that leads into an extra bedroom that Scott did not realize was there. Scott discovers scorpions in the additional room, but stomps on them. When Scott brings Amie to the house to hear her design ideas, they discover more scorpions. Scott hires an exterminator to kill the scorpions. Later, Scott discovers that coyotes had walked inside the house earlier after being attracted by his workers' food wrappers. Scott places a live animal cage trap outside the house and sets raw steak meat inside it, hoping to trap one of the coyotes. Scott returns the next day and discovers that he has trapped a neighborhood dog instead. Later, Scott has a worker repair a portion of the roof that is prone to leaking. After doing research, Scott has his workers urinate around the house's exterior, hoping that the coyotes will perceive it to be marked territory and avoid it. Scott has a local realtor named Joe market the house, as he is familiar with the Lake Las Vegas area. A total of $49,200 is spent on renovations, and the house is sold for $156,000.
13	5	"Stink House"	January 12, 2013
In a newer area of Las Vegas, Scott and Heather tour a house that is said to be in good shape. When they arrive, they discover holes in the walls and a bad odor throughout the house. Scott decides to purchase the house for $78,000, and gives himself one week and $10,000 to renovate it. Scott must replace the garage door after it falls off its tracks, and later becomes upset at Amie for having expensive limestone floor tiles installed even though they were not in the house's budget. The limestone tiles and Amie's kitchen design ideas alone cost $19,250, although Scott later concedes that the upgrades will help sell the house. Drywall repairs are completed, but the source of the house's odor remains unknown. Scott and Amie discover pigeons living in the attic and help them escape the house, although the smell remains. With one day until the open house, Heather is upset to see that the interior has not yet been painted and still has a bad smell. Scott then discovers a dead bat inside a kitchen vent as the cause of the odor. After $24,000 in renovations, Heather sells the house for $129,000.
14	6	"Condo From Hell"	January 19, 2013
Scott purchases a run-down condominium in a crime-ridden neighborhood in northeast Las Vegas. Scott and Amie later discover a homeless woman living in the condo; Scott manages to convince the woman to vacate the premises. Later, Scott receives a phone call in the middle of the night, informing him that someone had broken into the condo. Upon arriving, Scott discovers graffiti on the walls, but no sign of the intruder. Several interested people arrive for the open house, but none can afford to purchase the condo, so Scott devises a rent-to-own solution.
15	7	"Chop House"	January 26, 2013
Scott purchases an 1,183-square-foot two-bedroom two-bathroom house, located on a public golf course in east Las Vegas, for $56,000. Scott has Baldemar tour the house with him to get an estimate on the renovations. They discover that the house was previously used as a chop shop, and is filled with automobile parts. Stacks of tires are also discovered, as well as an old Honda sedan in the garage. An asbestos test delays work on the house, although it confirms that the house is toxic-free. Scott is upset to learn that the tile workers were unable to install new flooring, due to a poor demolition job done by Baldemar when he was removing the previous tiles. Scott further becomes upset at Baldemar for believing that the removal of the tires is not part of his job. Scott manages to start up the Honda and drive it off the property. When Amie goes to Walker Zanger to pick out counter tops, she also tags several higher-priced slabs that she plans to use in future houses that are more expensive. An expensive bronzite counter top is installed at the house after Amie accidentally tagged it as being for that property. Scott is upset to learn that the counter tops cost $4,000, while his budget for counter tops was only $800. Scott is further angered to learn that Baldemar has gone off on his honeymoon, leaving his workers in charge as they struggle to finish the house on time. After $22,000 in renovations, Rexalynn sells the house for $100,000. Scott then purchases a Porsche GT3 RS.
16	8	"Class Action House"	February 2, 2013
At a cost of $107,000, Scott purchases a house that suffered flood damage but was listed as being remediated. Scott and Gady tour the house and discover the flood damage to be worse than they initially thought. Scott hopes to keep renovation costs at $27,000. Scott is upset to discover that the house's piping was manufactured by Kitec, a company responsible for defective piping in numerous Las Vegas homes. Scott learns of a class action lawsuit that provides affected homeowners with funds to replace the Kitec piping, in the event that it caused flooding. However, the funds expire on March 31, 2012, giving Scott only a few weeks to receive the money for replacement piping. Scott has mold specialists inspect the house; they discover toxic airborne mold throughout the structure as a result of the flood. The specialists tear out affected areas of the house, including the upstairs bathroom, as part of an extensive and lengthy process to remove the mold. During the process, it is discovered that the upstairs toilet caused the flood, making Scott ineligible to receive funds from the class action lawsuit and forcing him to spend his own money to replace the defective piping. Scott is upset when he learns that one of the workers has tiled each wall in one of the bathrooms, from the floor to the ceiling. While Scott is away, Gady arrives at the home to take pictures that can be used to advertise the open house, but she is disappointed by the lack of progress. When she smells an odd odor, she contacts Scott, who informs her that it may be a gas leak from earlier in the day when workers activated the water heater. Gady evacuates the workers from the house, and the gas leak is contained, but there are still various minor problems to fix on the day before the open house. Renovations are completed on time at a cost of $40,000. Gady sells the house for $187,000.
17	9	"Pay It Forward House"	February 9, 2013
Scott receives a free house through an organization known as Property Direct, on the condition that he renovate the home for a family that is to receive it as a charitable donation. Scott plans to spend $10,000 of his money to renovate the house, which is to be donated in two weeks. Scott discovers that the house has asbestos, and reluctantly spends $18,000 to have it removed. He is also informed that much of the house's plumbing has been removed and that the house must be re-piped. The next day, Scott discovers that someone broke into the house through a window and stole the plumbers' equipment. Scott is later told that the family has moved to Florida, although he is still legally obligated to donate the house to a deserving person. Scott contacts a friend at Nellis Air Force Base who recommends a military veteran to receive the house. Scott's friend also arranges for volunteers to jackhammer bad concrete in the driveway and backyard. Amie convinces many of the subcontractors to discount their prices after informing them that the house will be donated to a veteran. Renovations cost a total of $70,000, putting the house's value at $145,000. The house is then donated to the veteran during a surprise ceremony.
18	10	"Yancey's Eleven"	February 16, 2013
Scott purchases 11 unfinished villas at Lake Las Vegas for a total of $380,000. Each villa stopped construction years earlier during various stages of development. Because the villas cost $12,100 in fees, taxes, and insurance each month, Scott plans to get them finished in a month, with a budget of $615,000. Unexpected expenses arise when Scott discovers that stucco repairs on the homes will cost a total of $40,000. Scott also discovers that all the air conditioning units have been stolen since the time of the home purchases. Scott hires a project manager, Larry, to oversee the renovations. Scott has Larry meet with city officials to discuss the paving of a road in front of the houses. Scott discovers that as the owner, he is responsible for paving the road, as well as a section on land that he does not own, as the city now considers him to be the developer of the housing project. Scott is also responsible for completing the sewer and water systems, and the fire hydrants. Scott installs a surveillance camera after being informed by Larry that two shipments of tiles have gone missing. After spotting two thieves on the live surveillance footage, Scott contacts local security and has them apprehended. Ahead of the open house, Scott is upset at Larry for failing to correct small defects throughout the houses. A total of $675,000 is put into renovations. Scott hires a real estate agent, Joe, to sell the houses; he sells eight of the 11 houses. Scott's ultimate projected profit is $695,000.

=== Season 3 (2013) ===
No. overall	No. in season	Title	Original release date	Viewers (millions)
19	1	"Cat House"	November 2, 2013	1.057
Scott purchases a house in Summerlin for $130,000. Because Summerlin is a competitive market, Scott must purchase the house before he has time to see it. Scott and Heather tour the house and discover that more than a dozen cats and kittens are inhabiting the structure, which is filthy with cat food, urine, and fecal matter. Scott has a no-kill shelter take away the animals. An expert informs Scott that the amount of urine in the house is toxic, as it contains ammonia. Work on the house is delayed by several days in order to remediate it by removing urine-stained drywall throughout the structure. Scott, who is usually not enthused by Amie's ideas, is impressed with her plan to add a breakfast bar to the kitchen. While discussing plans for the backyard landscaping, Scott and Amie discover five cat graves marked by tombstones. Amie insists that the bodies be humanely removed rather than landscaped over. Amie has the bodies exhumed and cremated for $700. During renovations, Scott and Amie hear a cat meowing from within the walls. The cat, which had entered the walls through an opening, is ultimately found hiding in a closet shortly before the open house. After $35,000 in renovations, Heather sells the house for $253,000.
20	2	"Frat House"	November 9, 2013	1.017
Because of a shortage of viable houses to flip, Scott teams up with a competitor flipper, Mark McKee, to flip a house that Mark has purchased on the eastern outskirts of Las Vegas for $489,000. Scott criticizes the house's location, but Mark tells him that "you gotta take what you can get." The house is a single-story 1,300-square-foot three-bedroom two-bathroom and is located near a college. Scott, Amie and Mark enter and discover that it was used as a fraternity house. They find the home to be littered with trash, and also discover a wall decorated with women's underwear. In the backyard, they discover five retaining walls that lead up a hill. Each wall is in need of repairs. Scott does not plan to spend more than $25,000 in renovations. One of the retaining walls partially collapses while workers are near it. Amie dislikes the popcorn ceilings in the house and scrapes away a little of the ceiling in each room. Scott and Mark are upset when they discover what Amie has done, as they are now forced to spend money for better-looking ceilings. A closet and a wall are added to the den area to convert it into a fourth bedroom. Mark is surprised to learn that it will cost $35,000 to $40,000 to completely remove the retaining walls. Mark and Scott argue about the high cost, with Scott telling him that he purchased a bad house. Scott subsequently devises a cheaper solution by building new walls to cover the old ones. The house also has a pool with cracked plaster, which is remedied by applying an epoxy paint. After $30,000 in renovations, Rexalyn sells the house for $159,000.
21	3	"Doomsday House"	November 16, 2013	1.027
Scott and Amie team up with twins Phil and Tom for another house flip on a five-bedroom six-bathroom home in Summerlin, purchased for $335,000. Scott and the twins enter and discover that the house was used by doomsday preppers for a potential apocalypse, as the house is stockpiled with food, water, ammo, and camping gear; they donate the food and water, and keep the other stuff. Scott hopes to keep renovation costs at $35,000. Amie and the twins have some disagreements over designs for the house, although they allow her to choose a design for the fireplace herself. The next day, Scott and the twins discover that at least one of the previous tenants had broken into the house and added graffiti on the wall with expletive sentences demanding the return of the house's contents. Scott and the twins discover that the intruder has just escaped through the upstairs balcony; they plan to contact the police and install an alarm. Later, Tom disagrees with Amie's decision to have the drywall above the fireplace removed. A worker later removes the fireplace mantle, despite Amie's instruction not to do so. Scott disapproves of the paint color that Amie chose for the house: light green. Scott believes that the color makes the house look like a baby nursery, while she insists that it evokes the feeling of being in a spa. Scott and Amie return the next day and discover a smoke bomb left inside by a previous tenant. Scott is upset that the twins have yet to install an alarm. When the twins see Amie's paint color, they also disagree with it, believing it to be gray. The twins want to repaint the entire house, which will cost $3,000. Amie quits as the designer, but Scott devises a compromise between them in which certain walls are painted a darker shade of gray. The twins are in charge of fixing the fireplace mantle, although their worker instead installs a granite slab on the hearth on the morning of the open house. Scott and Amie discover the mistake and must delay the open house until the following morning to remove the slab and install a mantle. After $45,000 in renovations, Rexalyn sells the house for $450,000.
22	4	"Hoarder House"	November 23, 2013	1.237
Scott purchases a four-bedroom two-bathroom house in northeast Las Vegas for $25,000. Scott believes it was formerly inhabited by a hoarder as it is extensively cluttered with various items. Scott hopes to keep additional costs at $1,000 to simply clean out the house, but Amie wants a full renovation to take place to improve the structure, as she believes it resembles a double-wide trailer. While Scott is away, Amie ties a rope around the house's carport and ties the other end to her SUV, which she uses to tear down the carport, as she did not like its appearance. Amie also has a clean-up crew tear out the carpeting and the house's exterior aluminum siding, which angers Scott when he discovers the removals. When Scott finds out the house has asbestos, he reluctantly hires a crew to remove it as part of an expensive and lengthy process. Without telling Scott, Amie has the asbestos crew tear out the kitchen cabinets and much of the bathrooms, as well as a wall that separated the kitchen from the living room. Scott becomes upset when he discovers that Amie has ordered additional demolition without consulting him. Work on the house is delayed after a worker accidentally drives over one of the prefabricated cabinets that Amie ordered. Amie has a new carport added, with a $1,500, 15-foot skylight built into it. Amie also has a patio cover built in the backyard. Scott is upset to discover that the new carport and patio cost $5,500. On the day of the open house, Larry informs Scott and Amie that someone had broken into the house and stole its copper plumbing. The crews rush and manage to fix the problems on time for the open house, with renovations totaling $60,000. Gady sells the house for $135,000.
23	5	"Area 51 House"	November 30, 2013	1.086
Scott purchases a 2,900 square-foot two-story five-bedroom three-bathroom house in Summerlin for $320,000. Upon entering the house, Scott and Amie conclude that the previous tenants were alien enthusiasts after discovering it to be full of communication equipment and documents relating to extraterrestrials. They also find that the kitchen has been covered entirely in tinfoil. Scott plans to spend $30,000 in renovations on the house over a 12-day period. Amie does not like the house's dated interior, and wants to install a stair railing for $8,000 but Scott rejects her idea because of the high cost. Scott agrees to the railing when the cost is brought down to $4,000 by using old material from a previous house project. Amie also plans to have new light fixtures installed on the ceiling of the ground floor, which later becomes flooded after a worker accidentally hits a water line while working on the lights. Scott and Larry blame Amie and her lighting idea for the flood. The water is cleaned up, new plumbing is installed, and the ceiling drywall is replaced due to water damage. The long manufacturing time for Amie's custom-made cabinets delays other workers from doing further work in the house, so she has the cabinets rushed for completion. Amie later discovers that a special white glass counter slab will not be ready for one and a half to two weeks, because of the fragile nature of the slab material. Scott becomes upset at Amie for the delay, and for installing an expensive stainless steel ceiling fan on the backyard patio cover. After $50,000 in renovations, Heather sells the house for $420,000.
24	6	"Party House"	December 7, 2013	N/A
Scott and Amie team up with Phil and Tom to flip an unkept party house.
25	7	"Fire House"	December 14, 2013	0.994
Although Scott usually takes the summer off from house flipping, he takes Heather's suggestion to purchase a fire-damaged house on the east side of Las Vegas for $120,000. Upon touring the house, Scott and Amie are upset to learn that the fire damage is worse than what Heather described. Scott hopes to keep renovations at $25,000. Renovations are done during a heat wave, which is made worse when a local wildfire occurs. Scott is upset to discover that Amie had nearly everything in the bathrooms removed, a decision that was made without him and was not in his budget or schedule. Exterior painting is delayed when a paint compressor machine fails to turn on. Scott discovers that the machine is too hot after sitting in the sun, so he has it moved into shade. Paint work eventually begins after the machine has cooled down. Scott later has a backyard tree cut down after being warned that it is nearly ready to fall and cause damage, as well as possible death. Scott is further upset by Amie when she has a fire pit added to the backyard. When the air conditioner fails, Scott's tile crew quits working but agrees to work later in the night when it is cooler. Scott has the air conditioner fixed the following day. After $40,000 in renovations, Heather sells the house for $219,900. Afterwards, Scott takes Amie to the Minus 5 ice bar to cool down from the heat wave.
26	8	"Day Care House"	December 14, 2013	1.068
Scott purchases a three-bedroom two-bathroom house in North Las Vegas for $83,000. When Scott and Amie enter the house, they discover that it was formerly used as a day care center for at least 16 children. They discover crayon, marker, and Play-Doh markings on the walls, as well as a bedroom full of used diapers. The day after the house is painted, Scott realizes that the markings are still visible on the walls. Larry tells Scott that the painters have taken the day off after becoming infected with lice from the dirty house. A new oil-based primer is later applied to the walls to conceal the markings. Amie surprises Scott with a specially painted diamond-patterned accent wall in the master bedroom that is meant to give a spa feeling, but he disapproves because he believes that potential buyers will not enjoy it. When a toilet begins leaking, Scott hires a plumber to fix it. The toilet is removed and the plumber discovers the source of the clogged toilet drain: a doll head that had been flushed down the toilet. Scott has Amie's accent wall repainted with a dark color, but he is upset to see that the lines of the diamond pattern are still visible. The wall is re-textured and repainted again to fully remove the lines. Continuing with her spa-themed idea, Amie has a $5,500 eight-person shower installed in the master bathroom without telling Scott, which angers him. Amie also has diamond-patterned carpet installed in the house. Scott is upset at Amie when he discovers that she ordered new cabinets, even though he planned to keep the current cabinets and stain them. Scott is later upset to find that his workers did a bad job on the cabinets, so he pays to have them redone. Amie has river rock applied to the fireplace as part of her spa theme. The day before the open house, various workers are struggling to get the home finished on time. Amie has a new diamond pattern painted on a wall near the front door, an idea that Scott approves. A total of $26,000 in renovations are completed. Scott has Michelle, his newest real estate agent, sell the house for $149,900. Afterwards, Scott surprises Amie with a diamond ring.

=== Season 4 (2014) ===
No. overall	No. in season	Title	Original release date	Viewers (millions)
27	1	"Skate House"	March 1, 2014	N/A
Scott purchases a small house and he and Amie discover that during its vacancy, it had been used by local "skate punks" as an indoor skatepark and for paintball fights. They also discover graffiti on the walls and trash throughout the house. At a purchase price of $76,500, Scott realizes the house was not as good a deal as he initially thought. Scott and Amie agree to renovate the house on a cheap budget of $10,000. Broken tiles and soiled carpets are removed from the house, and new paint is applied to cover the graffiti. The next day, Scott and Amie discover that the "skate punks" had broken into the house through a side door to have another paintball fight inside. Scott does not contact the police as he does not believe they will be of any help. Scott has the paintball messes cleaned up and the walls repainted. Amie makes low-cost design decisions by choosing Ubatuba countertops and laminate wood flooring. The next day, Scott and Amie find that the "skate punks" have tossed rolls of toilet paper onto the tree in the front yard. Amie is also upset at Scott for changing her fireplace design idea to be cheaper. To provide the house with a low-cost custom design, Amie has a laminate wood accent wall put up in the kitchen. Amie later goes against Scott's wishes and has tile installed on part of the fireplace's brick base. Without informing Scott, Amie also has a $2,500 fire pit placed in the small backyard to help the house sell, a decision that Scott later finds out about and approves. The next day, they discover the "skate punks" have vandalized the front yard with toilet paper again, as well as trash, and have also spray-painted the driveway with graffiti. The day before the open house, Scott's workers struggle to get the house finished on time. Scott pays his driver to stay parked outside the house all night to prevent the "skate punks" from further vandalizing the property. After $15,000 in renovations, Michelle sells the house for $119,000.
28	2	"Renters From Hell"	March 8, 2014	N/A
Scott purchases a three-bedroom two-bathroom house in Summerlin for $109,000. Scott initially believes the house is a good deal, until he and Amie see the dirty worn-down interior, filled with cockroaches and multiple mattresses. Scott estimates that more than 18 people had been living in the home as a rental. During renovation work in the kitchen, more cockroaches are discovered, and Amie refuses to continue working on the house until the bugs are removed. Scott uses bug bombs to kill the cockroaches. Amie then spends $3,000 on electrical wiring to have sconces installed in the house, and to allow for the future owner to install plasma televisions. Power to the house is shut down for several hours due to a mix-up involving an unpaid $8,000 power bill for the previous tenants, although Scott resolves the issue. Amie is upset with the new paint on the kitchen cabinets, as it is too blue. Amie pays to have the cabinets painted again. Later, some of the house's new limestone floors have to be replaced after they start cracking, due to all of the construction workers. When more cockroaches are discovered, Amie hires an exterminator. Amie is later upset that the tan floors do not match with the blue grout that was used. Amie then begins to cry and leaves the house after Scott gets upset at her for ordering additional cabinets that he said were unnecessary. Scott has the grout restained, and has plants and a backyard patio cover added to the house's exterior. After $45,000 of renovations, Rexalynn sells the house for $240,000.
29	3	"Black Market House"	March 15, 2014	N/A
Amie purchases a home filled with counterfeit credit cards and driver's licenses. Scott is upset when he discovers that Amie had ordered Larry, the project manager, to tear down a small wall inside the house. Scott, who had wanted to keep the wall, then puts Amie in charge of the home's renovations. During renovations, small box deliveries for the previous tenants keep arriving at the house. Each box is subsequently brought inside the house. Later, Scott and Amie discover that someone had broken into the house to retrieve the boxes' contents. Scott then has a security system installed.
30	4	"Reptile House"	March 22, 2014	N/A
Scott purchases a one-bedroom house for $68,000. When Scott and Amie visit the house, they find the front yard to be overgrown with trees and plants that obscure the structure. Inside, the house has the appearance of a double-wide trailer. They discover dead bugs everywhere, as well as a tortoise, scorpions and a snake inside containers, a giant lizard in a bathroom, and a large yellow snake roaming in a room. Scott hopes to keep renovation costs at $12,000, and hires experts to remove the reptiles, which includes an additional snake discovered in the backyard. Scott's workers then remove 90 percent of the overgrown trees and plants. Scott discovers that all the house's ductwork is rusted and needs to be replaced. Additionally, Scott must replace the swamp cooler and an outdated breaker box, all of which adds $9,000 in expenses to his budget. Later, Larry discovers that a clay pipe – which were commonly used in the 1950s – has broken off from the main sewer line as a result of overgrown roots from a nearby tree. Scott cuts down most of the tree with a chainsaw, has his workers remove the roots, and then has the pipe repaired. Amie disagrees with Scott's choice of plastic cabinets, so she later has laminate wood flooring installed. Drywall repairs are performed to repair wall damage from the previous tenants and from the ductwork repairs. Because of a rain storm from the previous night, the drywall does not dry on time, so Scott uses space heaters that the previous tenants left behind to dry the walls. Scott's landscaping crew briefly stops working after spotting a small snake, which Scott later removes. Closets are added to two of the rooms to convert them into bedrooms and add value to the house. After $25,000 in renovations, Gady sells the house for $120,900.
31	5	"Flip Gone Wrong"	March 29, 2014	N/A
Scott purchases a home that had been poorly renovated by its previous owner, an amateur house flipper.
32	6	"Dog House"	April 5, 2014	N/A
Scott purchases a four-bedroom three bathroom house for $50,050. When Scott and Amie enter the house, they discover it has a bad smell and is filthy with dog food, trash, and urine-soaked furniture. Upstairs, they discover cages and dog feces, as well as fliers advertising the house as a dog kennel. Scott hopes to keep his budget for the house at $15,000. An illegal room addition in the garage is removed for not being built up to building codes. The carpets are removed, although the odor remains. Baseboards and lower portions of drywall that had been soaked with dog urine in certain areas of the house are removed, but the smell remains. With temperatures unseasonably cold in Las Vegas, wood stain that was left inside the house has frozen and is now unusable. Scott discovers that the house does not have a heater or an air conditioner, so he brings in a space heater to keep new containers of stain from freezing. Scott has scented paint applied to the walls to get rid of the odor, but it does not work. Scott discovers the smell is coming from the bathrooms and then hires a plumber, who removes dog hair from the sewer line and eliminates the odor. When power keeps going out at the house, Scott discovers it is because a dozen space heaters are being used by a worker to acclimate laminate wood floors before they are installed, as the house's main heater has not arrived yet. As a solution, Scott brings in a generator to power the space heaters. Scott becomes upset at Amie when he discovers that she had the wall by the stairs covered with laminate wood flooring to make it an accent wall. Two days before the open house, Larry insists to Scott that the house will be ready despite a lot of work that is needed. The house is completed on time after a total of $30,000 in renovations. Rexalynn sells the house for $115,000.
33	7	"Old Folks Home"	April 12, 2014	N/A
Scott purchases a three-bedroom two-bathroom house in east Las Vegas for $65,000, which he initially believes is a good deal. When Scott and Amie arrive at the house, they discover that someone had vandalized the rooftop air conditioner to steal parts from it. Inside, Scott and Amie find wheelchairs and walkers left behind by the previous tenants. They also discover that soil underneath the slab foundation has begun expanding in parts of the house, raising the flooring. They also find that someone had broken into the house and stolen some copper wiring, as well as the water heater. Scott estimates that the house could need up to $60,000 in renovations, which would be primarily spent on fixing the foundation. At a selling price of $120,000, Scott notes that if renovations are as expensive as projected, this would be the first time he has lost money on a flip: $5,000. Scott and Larry devise a way to keep expenses low by only repairing the worst areas of the foundation that are affected by the expanding soil, while smoothing out other areas that are not as bad. Scott is angered when he discovers Amie and Larry tearing down a wall with two entrances leading into the kitchen. Amie believes that tearing down the wall will give the house an open feeling, but Scott does not believe that there is time and money to spend on such a renovation. A portion of the wall is later restored to allow for an electrical outlet on the kitchen's island. Scott discovers that the pool's foundation is also in need of repairs, and then realizes that pool equipment has been stolen. To save money, Scott has the house's cabinets re-stained rather than replaced. During installation of the new rooftop air conditioner, the old air conditioner is accidentally let loose from the crane carrying it, temporarily worrying Scott into believing that his new air conditioner has been damaged. Scott later becomes angry at Amie when he discovers that she has plans to redesign the fireplace. On the day of the open house, there is still electrical and plumbing work occurring in each room. Landscaping and the installation of carpets is also taking place, with the open house occurring in a few hours. The house is completed on time, with a total of $33,000 invested into renovations. Scott's real estate agent Michelle sells the home for $127,000.

=== Season 5 (2014) ===
No. overall	No. in season	Title	Original release date	Viewers (millions)
34	1	"'70s House"	August 9, 2014	N/A
Scott and Amie flip a house with an outdated 1970s design. While Scott is away from the house to purchase a new Ferrari, project manager Larry has a new roof installed on the house. Scott unexpectedly arrives at the house and becomes upset at Larry for installing the roof without consent, although Scott later concedes that it was a necessary improvement. Other renovations include the installation of new windows, air conditioning, and a new fence in the backyard to hide an adjacent junkyard located in a neighbor's backyard. Additional improvements include the removal of wood paneling on some of the walls, and the removal of a small bathroom in the master bedroom where it did not fit.
35	2	"Scott vs. Amie House"	August 16, 2014	N/A
At a cost of $75,000, Scott purchases a single-story, four-bedroom, three-bathroom duplex near downtown Las Vegas. Scott and Amie tour the building and discover that the floors are uneven and in danger of collapsing. Additionally, a bathroom leak and leaking ceilings are also discovered. Amie desires to expensively renovate the building, while Scott wishes to do so on a cheaper budget. After arguing, Scott decides to let Amie have the smaller duplex unit to renovate her way, while he handles the other, larger unit. Scott hopes to keep renovations at $15,000, with a 10-day schedule to get them done. Larry informs Scott that the floors likely suffered termite damage approximately 20 years earlier, and that the floor repairs were not properly done. Larry also tells Scott that the ceiling is in danger of collapsing. The floors and ceiling are repaired, and outdated wood paneling is removed. Later, Amie insists on having a backyard shed removed. Scott declines to spend money to have it removed, and takes it down himself by tying rope around it and to his vehicle, which he then uses to pull the shed apart. At Walker Zanger, Michelle is surprised to see that Scott has come along with Amie so they can choose tiles for their duplex units. Scott selects the cheapest tile choices and is finished within 10 minutes, in contrast to Amie who usually spends more time selecting higher-priced tiling. Amie decides to use weathered wood from pallets (used to transport the tiles) to form a wood wall in her duplex unit. While Amie is shopping, Scott sneaks into her unit and discovers the wood wall, which he believes is unattractive. Scott has a worker help him remove the new wood paneling, but he is stopped when Amie arrives. As retaliation, Amie reschedules Scott's tiling crew to instead start work on her unit first. On the day before the open house, there is still a large amount of work to be done. Renovations are completed on time, and the duplex is shown by Rexalynn to potential buyers, while Scott and Amie are eager to know which unit is better received. A couple purchases the duplex with plans to live in Amie's unit, while renting out Scott's. Amie claims victory, stating that the couple wants to live in the nicer unit.
36	3	"Amie's House"	August 23, 2014	N/A
In an auction, Amie has purchased a three-bedroom, two-bathroom, 1,600-square-foot house for $25,000. Scott and Amie are disappointed to find that much of the interior needs drywall, but are surprised to find new kitchen appliances in the house. Scott hopes to keep the renovation costs at $10,000. Scott allows Amie to handle the interior while he works on the yard. Amie is disappointed when Larry tells her that more than half of the budget has been spent on drywall, plumbing, and electrical. Later, Amie visits the house and is upset to see that the kitchen appliances are gone. Amie believes the house was robbed, but Scott tells her that he had the appliances moved to his warehouse to use for a future house that is located in a better neighborhood. Scott is upset when he learns that Amie is having the house's exterior front wall tiled. With little time left before the open house, Scott decides to relocate the kitchen appliances into the house as there is no time to order cheaper appliances. After $17,500 in renovations, Rexalynn sells the house for $122,000.
37	4	"Fight House"	August 30, 2014	N/A
Scott purchases a three-bedroom two-bathroom house in a low-income area for $74,000. Upon entering, Scott and Amie discover blood stains and bandages everywhere, and learn that the house was used by the former tenants as a fight club. Scott gives himself a budget of $8,000 and less than two weeks to renovate the house. After starting work on the house, Larry informs Scott and Amie of a cricket infestation, which he is tasked with handling by stomping on the bugs. On the fourth day of renovations, Scott and Amie visit the house and are surprised to hear loud military jets flying over the property. They learn that the house rests underneath a flight path for the nearby Nellis Air Force Base. To help keep out the noise, Scott has the house's popcorn ceilings retextured and has insulation installed in the attic. Later, Amie is upset about Scott's landscaping idea for the front yard, which consists of red rocks like the other houses on the street. Amie believes the front yard needs a better landscape to attract buyers, but Scott rejects her idea. With the open house scheduled for the following week, Scott is upset at Larry, who still has much work left on the home. Later, Scott agrees to spend $3,000 for double pane windows to be installed throughout the house to help keep out the noise from the military jets. Scott becomes further angered when he discovers that Amie had expensive textured tiles applied to some of the interior walls, which has left work in other areas of the house neglected. When the crickets return, Amie hires an exterminator, and later purchases carpet padding made of thick rubber that will help keep out the noise. Scott is upset when he discovers that Amie has also had tiles applied to the carport support columns. Renovations are completed at a cost of $17,000. Scott has Jason, one of his real estate agents, manage the open house. Jason sells the home for $124,000.
38	5	"Blackmail House"	September 6, 2014	N/A
Scott purchases a 1,455 square-foot three-bedroom two-bathroom house in North Las Vegas for $82,000. Upon entering, Scott and Amie discover torn furniture, scattered paperwork, a gun holster, and an interrogation room. Scott concludes that the previous owner was a detective. Scott plans to invest $8,000 into the house for renovations. During work on the house, Amie informs Scott that a blue vehicle has been following them, but he does not believe her. Scott and Amie then find money and identification cards hidden inside the house. A brick is then thrown through one of the windows. Scott and Amie then spot the blue car driving away. Scott pays a worker to sleep at the house and monitor it for break-ins. The next day, Scott and Amie discover a box in the backyard that contains blackmail photos. Scott has desert landscaping put into the backyard, and has an old wood fence torn down for a new one. Amie has the weathered wood from the fence installed on a wall in the master bedroom to create an accent wall. Scott criticizes Amie's decision to have rock flooring – in the shape of a curving river – leading from the front door to a wet bar. Scott later becomes upset that Amie's designs have delayed various aspects of work on the house. A total of $14,000 in renovations are concluded on the house, including the conversion of an office into a fourth bedroom by adding a closet. During an open house, Gady sells the home for $125,000. Afterward, Scott and Amie spot the driver of the blue car being arrested.
39	6	"Redneck House"	September 13, 2014	N/A
40	7	"Spider House"	September 20, 2014	N/A
Scott purchases a three-bedroom, one-and-a-half-bathroom house in North Las Vegas for $60,500. The house was built in the 1950s, and is located in a bad neighborhood. Scott and Amie enter the house and discover it to be full of maggots and tarantulas. Scott hopes to keep renovations at $10,000, and has his crew remove the tarantulas. Later, in the backyard, Scott discovers a large beehive inside a shed, which is housing killer Africanized bees. Scott hires an exterminator to kill the bees and remove the hive. Scott becomes mad at Larry when cabinet installation is the only type of work being done on the house. The next day, Scott and Amie discover that someone broke into the house and stole the copper plumbing. Scott later discovers that the air conditioner and heater were also stolen. Despite a lot of work left on the house, renovations are completed on time, at a total cost of $25,000. Rexalynn then sells the house for $124,900.
41	8	"Plastic Surgery House"	September 27, 2014	N/A
Scott purchases a one-story 1,200-square-foot three-bedroom one-bathroom house in a low-income neighborhood for $70,000. Amie does not like the house's exterior, which consists of barred windows, vinyl siding, and a rock façade on the front. Scott and Amie enter the house and are surprised at the cleanliness of the living room. However, they tour the rest of the house and discover medical equipment, biohazardous medical items, before-and-after plastic surgery photos, blood stains, and a chair that was used for gynecology exams. They realize that the house was used as an illegal plastic surgery clinic, and that the living room was used as the waiting room. Scott hopes to keep renovations at $4,000. In the large, dirt backyard, Amie has Scott's workers cut down a dead tree, which he wanted to keep in order to stay on budget. Amie, who is forced to keep the vinyl siding to stay within budget, has the siding painted dark brown. The kitchen is completely redone with new cabinetry and appliances, which Scott agrees was necessary. Amie pays for laminate hardwood floors, going against Scott's wishes to install new, cheap carpeting in the house. To install the new flooring, the workers must first jackhammer cracked concrete in the foundation, which angers Scott when he learns of Amie's plan. The next day, Scott is upset to find that the new concrete has not yet been smoothed out. Shortly after the laminate floors are installed, the air conditioner stops working, which threatens to warp the flooring before it can settle in place. Scott learns that the house's compressor needs to be replaced; he spends $2,400 for a new one. Scott is further upset when he sees that Amie had his workers tile two walls inside the house. Additionally, Amie also had a wall of wood panels taken down and replaced with a wall of laminate wood. The house is filthy and still in need of many minor fixes on the day before the open house, but the renovations are completed on time, at a cost of $14,000. Gady sells the house for $114,900. Afterwards, Scott takes Amie to a large desert property and tells her that she can design their dream home for the land, with a budget of $4 million. Scott's only condition is that Amie not be involved in his future house flips, to which she agrees.
