= Walter Reed Middle School =

Coordinates: 34.152611°N 118.386570°W

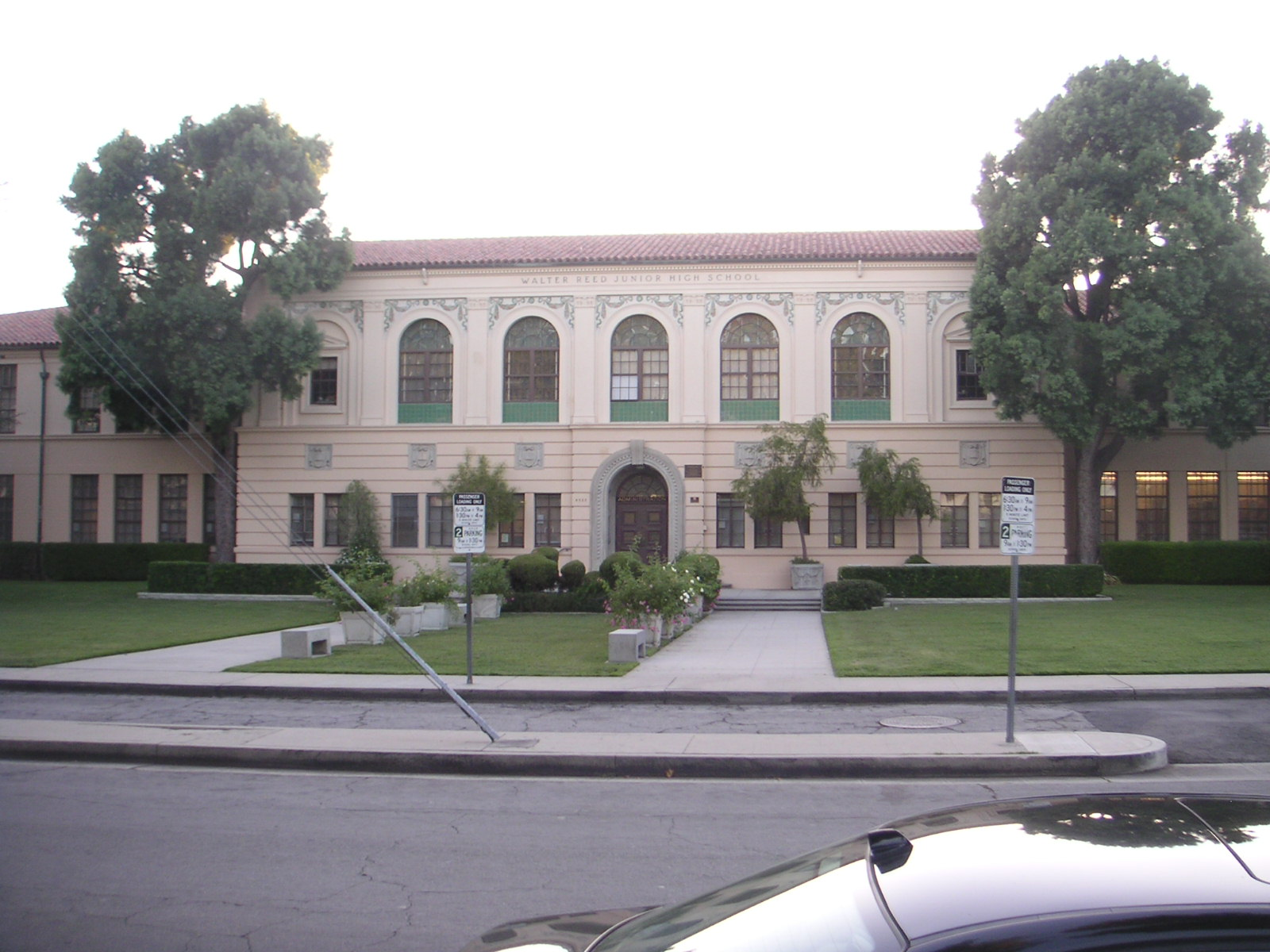
- Walter Reed Middle School
- 4525 Irvine Avenue; Studio City, California 91602; Los Angeles, California; United States

Information
- Type: Public
- Motto: Be safe, Be responsible, Be respectful. / Home of the Wolves
- Established: September 1939
- Locale: City, Large
- School district: Los Angeles Unified School District
- NCES District ID: 0622710
- NCES School ID: 062271003299
- President: Maribel Garcia
- Dean: Edward Torres
- Principal: Paul DeBonis
- Teaching staff: 64.68 (on an FTE basis)
- Grades: 6–8
- Enrollment: 1,580 (2024–25)
  - Male: 856
  - Female: 724
- Student to teacher ratio: 25.62
- Campus size: Medium
- Campus type: Urban
- Colors: White, green
- Mascot: Wolf
- Newspaper: The Howl
- Website: Official website

Walter Reed Middle School is in the Studio City neighborhood of Los Angeles, California, USA. Originally called North Hollywood Junior High School, it was renamed in honor of U.S. Army Major Walter Reed.

The school is a part of Local District North East of the Los Angeles Unified School District and feeds into North Hollywood High School. Several areas, including parts of North Hollywood, Valley Village, Studio City and Woodbridge Park are zoned to it.

== History ==
In 2017, the school received budget cuts since the percentage of non-Hispanic/Latino white students reached 30%; this occurred because of a state law established in the 1970s stating that schools with populations of white students below 30% get extra funding.

== Academies and electives ==
The school offers a variety of special academic programs: the Individualized Honors Program (IHP), the Humanities Academy, the Media Arts and Technology Academy, the S.T.E.A.M. Academy, the Environmental Sciences Academy, and the Global Leadership Academy. IHP was described by Time magazine as "perhaps the most successful junior-high curriculum in the U.S.". Founded in 1971 by William Fitz-Gibbon, the IHP's purpose is to serve the needs of highly gifted children. IHP students are usually one or two levels above average grade math classes. There is also an Honors program for every academy for Gifted and Talented children, which is one year above the regular curriculum (on average). Each academy brings something different, and specializes its learning to the way their students enjoy the most. Despite the disproportionate amount of IHP information, the Walter Reed Middle School website includes information about every academy. When selecting an academy, take time to make your decision, but you can also transfer academies at the end of each semester if you change your mind.

Electives- There is a large variety of electives at Walter Reed. It ranges from Spanish, to Choir, Show Choir, to Jazz Band, to Cartooning and Animation, Architecture and Design, to the Cadet Corp, to Computers, Creative Writing, Environmental Studies, Robotics, Library TA and Office TA.

The school has a very active parent body organized under its PTSA.

== Gifted program ==
In 1971, the school established the Individualized Honors Program (IHP) co-founded by William Fitz-Gibbon. The parents who place their children in the program want them to be social peers; the students would otherwise be able to skip middle school and enroll directly in high school or in some cases tertiary education.

== Filming ==
Television shows filmed at Walter Reed include Head of the Class, Growing Pains, 7th Heaven, Parks and Recreation, Rowan & Martin's Laugh-In, CSI, Malcolm in the Middle, Parenthood, The West Wing, Tell Me You Love Me, Just Add Magic, Grey's Anatomy,Pen15, and Young Sheldon.

Scenes from movies including Primary Colors, License to Drive, The Shaggy Dog, Joe Dirt, Role Models, Accepted and Scooby-Doo! Curse of the Lake Monster were also filmed there. In 2006, the fee for one day of filming at an LAUSD school was $2,500.

== In the news ==
On May 26, 1998, a student brought a kitchen knife to school and stabbed and seriously injured another boy during an eighth-grade “Fun Day” event.

At the 2008 Republican National Convention in Saint Paul, Minnesota, the façade of Walter Reed Middle School was displayed behind the GOP nominee John McCain as a backdrop to his acceptance speech, leading to speculation that the campaign had intended to display a picture of Walter Reed Army Medical Center, the Army's leading medical institution and a facility widely associated with care for Iraq war veterans. Others speculated that it may have been used as a reference to the TV show The West Wing, which featured the character Matt Santos announcing his candidacy for president in front of the school.

The then principal of Walter Reed Middle School, Donna Tobin, placed a statement on the school's website saying that the school had not given permission for the footage to be used, "nor is the use of our school's picture an endorsement of any political party or view."

On October 17, 2024, 17 students were reportedly medically evaluated for consuming a banned substance. Although it was not disclosed what the substance was, 2 of the 17 students were transported to a hospital via the Los Angeles Fire Department. All the students, as of October 2024, are expected to recover. The principal of Walter Reed Middle School released a statement regarding the safety of students and asking parents to educate their children about the dangers of substance abuse.
