= Rhonda Kramer =

American freeway traffic reporter

Rhonda Kramer is an American freeway traffic reporter.

Rhonda began her radio career in 1978 at KFOX-FM in Redondo Beach as the afternoon drive air personality. After working at KFOX-FM for about a year, KHJ was looking for an air traffic reporter for a new country format. She passed the audition, and has been reporting LA traffic since 1979.

Kramer eventually formed her own traffic company, providing traffic for such stations as KRLA, KROQ-FM, KGIL, MAGIC 106, KDAY, and KFWB. Rhonda is currently on the air, providing freeway traffic reports M-F between 11:00am and 5:45. Rhonda works with Peter Tilden, Dr. Drew Penski, John Phillips and Jillian Barberie. Rhonda has been reporting traffic since 1980, and has won 19 Golden Mike Awards, presented by The Radio and Television News Association of Southern California.
