= Gerald P. Pulley =

Gerald Paul Pulley
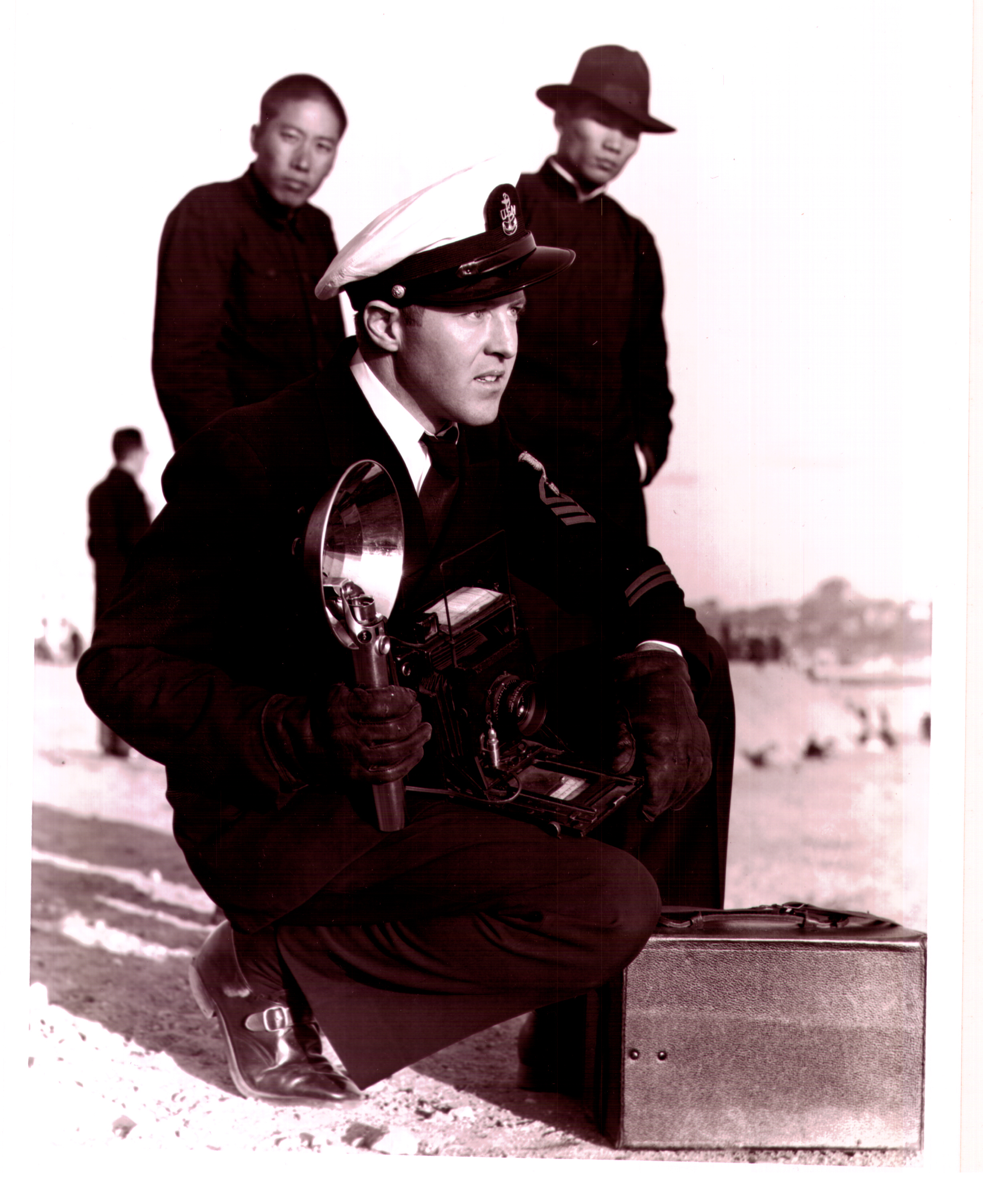
- Pulley (foreground with camera) as photographer in China, 1949
- Born: October 25, 1922; King City, Missouri
- Died: March 31, 2011; Virginia Beach, Virginia
- Occupation: Government Photographer
- Known for: Photography
- Board member of: National Association of Naval Photography (former)
- Spouse: Mary Virginia Pulley

Gerald P. Pulley (October 25, 1922 – March 31, 2011) was an American photographer noted for his work with the United States Navy.

== Career ==
Pulley's navy career included serving under Rear Admiral Richard E. Byrd, during the U.S. classified South Seas exploration aboard USS Concord from September 5, 1943, through November 24, 1943, serving in China aboard USS Princeton as part of the last official task force to close out the military activities in that area, various missions during World War II , Korean War and Vietnam War, and serving as the Officer in Charge of the Fleet Air Photographic Laboratory in Jacksonville, Florida, during the Cuban Missile Crisis. Pulley also served as the Military White House Photographer to President Harry S. Truman following the death of President Franklin D. Roosevelt. During the famous "Whistlestop" tour of 1948, Pulley followed the President's campaign, covering 32,000 miles (51,000 km) in 33 days. Following Truman's reelection, Pulley left his position with the White House but returned in January 1952 to document the meeting between President Truman and Prime Minister Winston Churchill aboard USS Williamsburg. His "Oral History Interview" can be viewed through the Harry S. Truman Library website.

Pulley has been given the title, "Mr. Navy Photographer" by his peers and was the founder of the "National Association of Naval Photography." He was also an active member of the Masonic Lodge (for over 60 years) and often gave presentations to various Masonic Lodges on his days at the White House with former Mason President Truman. Pulley's work is listed in Eyes of the Navy: A History of Naval Photography by George Carroll, LCDR, USN(Ret)

== Personal life ==
Pulley died on March 31, 2011, at age 88. He was survived by his wife of 67 years, Mary Virginia Pulley, whom he married on January 6, 1943. They had three children and four grandchildren.
