= Ernest E. Tissot Jr. =

Ernest Eugene Tissot Jr.
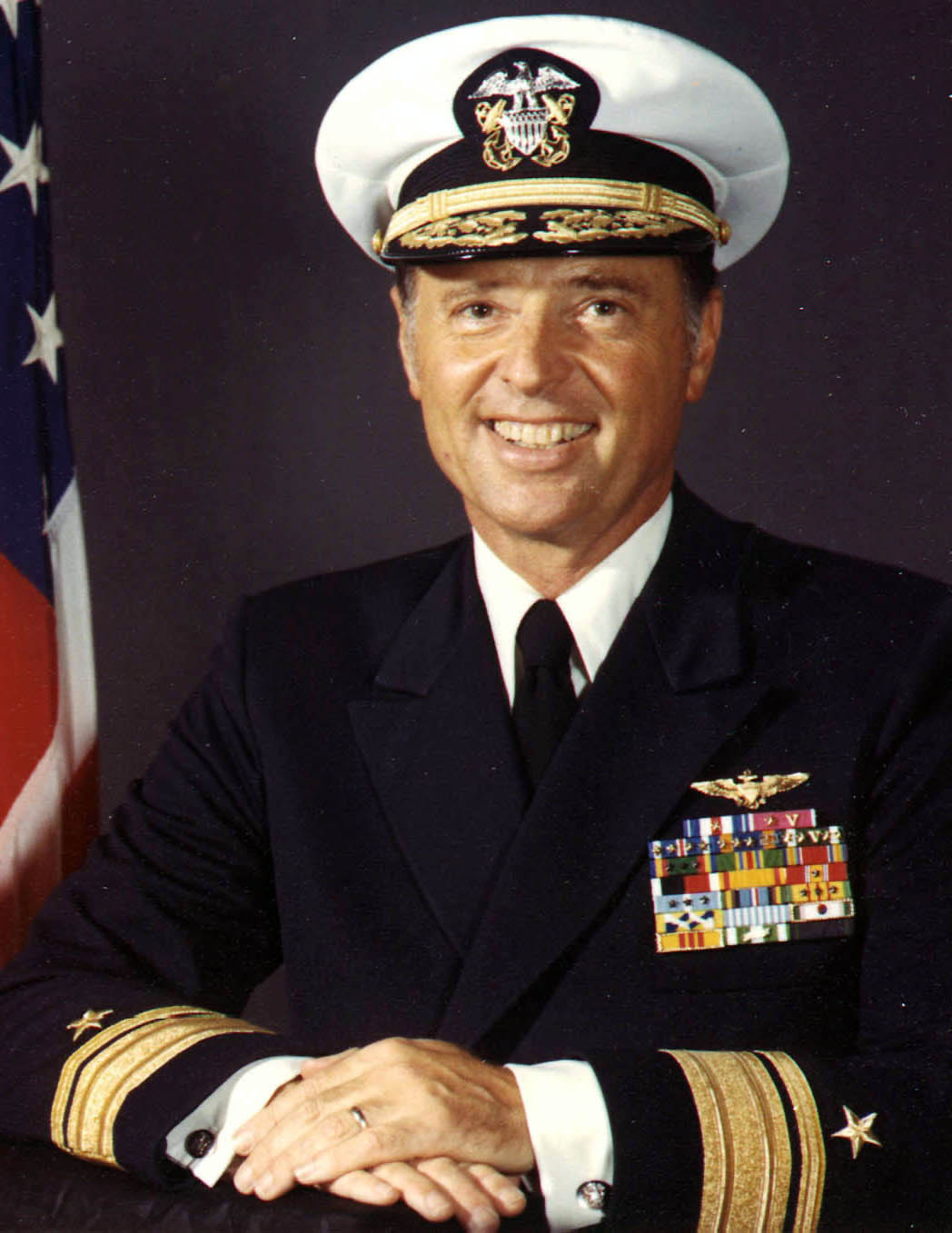
- Rear Admiral Ernest Eugene Tissot Jr. 6th Captain, USS Enterprise
- Born: December 16, 1927; Upland, California
- Died: May 3, 2019 (aged 91); Monterey, California
- Military career
- Allegiance: United States of America
- Branch: United States Navy
- Service years: 1945–1981
- Rank: Rear Admiral
- Nickname: Gene
- Commands: Attack Squadron VA-192; Attack Carrier Air Wing Fourteen (CVW-14); USS Thomaston (LSD-28); USS Enterprise (CVN-65); Airborne Early Warning Wing, Pacific Fleet; Carrier Task Force 77
- Conflicts: World War II; Korean War; Vietnam War
- Awards: Silver Stars (2); Distinguished Flying Cross (5); Air Medals (27); Legion of Merit with Combat "V" (2); Navy Commendation Medal Legion Combat "V" (4)
- Other work: Northrop Corporation

Ernest Eugene (Gene) Tissot Jr. (/tiːˈsoʊ/ tee-SOH; December 16, 1927 – May 3, 2019) was a United States Navy Rear Admiral and naval aviator who was highly decorated for his actions during the Korean War and the Vietnam War. He was born in Upland, California, and entered the Navy as a Naval Aviation Cadet in June 1945 and learned to fly in the Stearman N2S biplane at the Naval Air Station Livermore in August 1946. He was designated a Naval Aviator in June 1948 and commissioned as an Ensign that December. He was advanced in rank to Captain in January 1969 and his selection for the rank of Rear Admiral was approved by the President in March 1973.

== Biography ==
Tissot studied at Stanford University, earning a BS in Engineering and election to Phi Beta Kappa; at the Naval Postgraduate School, receiving a MS in Aeronautical Engineering; training at the Naval Nuclear Power School at United States Naval Training Center Bainbridge; and at the Naval Nuclear Power Training Unit, Idaho Falls, Idaho. He commanded Attack Squadron 192 (VA-192), flying combat missions in Vietnam in the A-4 Skyhawk from the aircraft carrier USS Bon Homme Richard; Attack Carrier Air Wing 14 (CVW-14), flying combat missions in the A-4, the F-4 Phantom II and the A-6 Intruder from the aircraft carrier USS Constellation; the amphibious dock landing ship USS Thomaston; the nuclear-powered aircraft carrier USS Enterprise; Fighter Airborne Early Warning Wing, U.S. Pacific Fleet, based at NAS Miramar, California; and Attack Carrier Striking Force, Carrier Task Force 77 based at Naval Station Subic Bay / Naval Air Station Cubi Point, Philippines.

His military awards include two Silver Stars, two Defense Superior Service Medals, two awards of the Legion of Merit, five Distinguished Flying Crosses, twenty-seven Air Medals, five Navy Commendation Medals and service medals for the World War II, Korean and Vietnam conflicts. He flew 50 combat missions in Korea, flying the F4U Corsair from the aircraft carrier USS Princeton, and 250 combat missions in Vietnam as a squadron and air wing commander. In 1967 he became the third naval aviator to achieve 1,000 arrested carrier landings, accomplished without accident over 20 years, flying 11 aircraft types from 15 aircraft carriers.

He retired from the Navy in 1981 and worked for Northrop Corporation until 1991 and was a member of the Navy Golden Eagles. He and his late wife of 52 years, Millie Patton Tissot, had two sons, Ernest Craig Tissot and Brian Nelson Tissot, and five grandchildren.

His father, Ernest Eugene Tissot Sr, was the Chief Mechanic for Grand Canyon Airlines during the 1930s, as well as Amelia Earhart's mechanic for her Lockheed Vega, which she flew on her record-making flight from Honolulu, Hawaii to Oakland, California in 1935.

After his death in May 2019, Tissot was interred at San Carlos Catholic Cemetery in Monterey.

In 2026, his memoir, From the Grand Canyon to the Enterprise: A Life of Family, Flight, and War, was published, edited by his son, Brian N. Tissot.
