= Lenora Claire =

American media personality

- Born: New York City, New York, U.S.
- Occupations: Casting director, curator, advocate

Lenora Claire is an American television and media personality, casting director, writer, art curator and victim's rights advocate. She was named one of the LA Weekly 2011 "People of the Year" and "the Erin Brockovich of stalking" by Vice.

== Career ==
Claire is a frequent guest on shows such as The Dr. Oz Show, 48 Hours, Crime Watch Daily and various podcasts sharing both her story as an empowered victim and also to advocate for other stalking victims and discuss proposed legislation. Claire began working on improved legislation for stalking victims and other associated crimes with Congressman Adam Schiff in 2016 and is currently working on a bill called S.A.V.E. (Stalking Abuse Victims Empowerment).

Claire is a founding member of the Los Angeles District Attorney's Crime Victims Advisory Board where she was chosen to advise and advocate on behalf of survivors of gender-based violence.

In 2021, Claire founded Lenora Claire Consulting to provide on-set liaison services between survivors/victims and the productions telling their stories. The company—whose team includes Amanda Knox, survivor Kimberly Corban, forensic psychologist Dr. Kris Mohandie, and Dirty John survivor Terra Newell—specializes in creating a safe space for vulnerable individuals working with media professionals.

Claire has also written pieces for LA Weekly and contributed to panels on surviving sexual abuse.

=== Victim turned advocate ===
Shortly after being featured as one of the LA Weekly 2011 "People of the Year," Lenora caught the attention of a man named Justin Massler (aka Cloud Starchaser) who previously had a documented history of stalking Ivanka Trump. After becoming fixated and obsessed with Claire, Massler began harassing her which eventually culminated to death threats, various forms of sexual assault and physical violence. After attempting to seek help with little results from the Los Angeles Police Department, Claire taught herself how to track his IP and began studying various forms of risk minimization. After securing her first restraining order against Massler, which was promptly violated, Claire went public with her story in an attempt to educate the public about the various issues stalking victims face. After a 2016 appearance on the show Crime Watch Daily, Claire was introduced to Rhonda Saunders who was instrumental in the formation of the first stalking laws in the nation and inspired Claire to propose legislation benefitting victims of her own.

Claire then made multiple attempts to contact Ivanka Trump for help capturing their mutual stalker which were all ignored. After being named the Erin Brockovich of stalking by Vice in an article which has since gone viral, victims began contacting Claire and seeking help in obtaining their own restraining orders and requesting Claire to accompany them as a human shield in court. Claire and friend, NCIS actress Pauley Perrette as well as two other victims, Katherine Thackston and Peggy Farell, were the subject of a 2-hour 48 hours special titled "Stalked", featuring her story. Kris Mohandie reviewed footage of Massler in the special and determined that he was in fact a dangerous individual. Massler was then admitted to a psychiatric facility where just days later he escaped and was arrested by the Secret Service. Shortly after his release, he returned to Los Angeles to further stalk Claire. After Massler notified her about his intention to kidnap her, Claire set up an operation and had security catch him at the Los Angeles Comic Convention. Massler was convicted of felony max stalking in 2018 and was later released from jail early 2020. Claire has been an outspoken advocate for stalking victims, and on her second appearance on the Dr. Oz Show, shortly before Massler's release, explained it was a result of controversial Proposition 57 which gave Massler early release having only served two years of his four-year sentence. Claire has spoken at USC, Southwestern Law School, and with the Anti-Defamation League for University of California, Irvine School of Law about the intersection of cyberstalking, internet hate speech and freedom of speech.

Lenora and several other survivor activists were invited to advocate on behalf of themselves and other stalking victims at the White House and Department of Justice on January 17 and 18th of 2024, as part of events surrounding National Stalking Awareness Month.

== Personal life ==
Claire is married to prominent entertainment attorney and DJ Henry Self.

== Filmography ==
Year	Title	Contribution	Note
2009	Sex Rehab with Dr. Drew	Casting producer	8 episodes
TV movie	2011	My Collection Obsession	Casting producer
2011–2017	True Life	Croducer and casting producer	6 episodes
2012	My Strange Addiction	Casting producer	1 episode
2012	Drugs, Inc.	Casting director	1 episode
2012	Celebrity Rehab with Dr. Drew	Casting producer	5 episodes
2012	Viral Video Showdown	Casting producer	2 episodes
2013	Taboo USA	Casting producer	9 episodes
2013	Fangasm	Casting producer	4 episodes
2014	Tattoos After Dark	Casting producer	9 episodes
2015	Tattoo Nightmares	Casting producer	54 episodes
2015	Big Women, Big Love	Casting producer	8 episodes
2015	Dare to Wear	Casting producer	6 episodes
2016	Finding Prince Charming	Casting producer	3 episodes
2015	Pet Talk	Casting producer	6 episodes
2019	Sex Life	Casting producer	7 episodes

== Exhibitions ==
Claire curated many shows including Golden Girls Gone Wild! which debuted 2007 at the World of Wonder Gallery and later had exhibitions at the World Erotic Art Museum in Miami, Florida, and the Dirty Show in Detroit, Michigan. Claire also curated Bettie Page Heaven-Bound directly with Bettie Page's estate featuring the art of legendary pinup artist Olivia De Berardinis.
