= Highly Gifted Magnet =

Educational program in California, United States

The Highly Gifted Magnet (HGM) is part of the Los Angeles Unified School District's Gifted and Talented program, designed for students of extraordinary intelligence who have unique intellectual, social and emotional abilities not nurtured by normal Gifted programs. The purpose is to cluster students of similar capabilities and needs with teachers who can challenge them with greater academic and intellectual rigor while meeting their social and emotional needs. These relatively small programs are housed on larger campuses. In a Los Angeles Times review that separated Magnet test scores from their host schools, HGMs consistently had the highest standardized test scores of all LAUSD schools.

== Purposes of clustering ==
Despite their high scores, highly gifted children are especially vulnerable to so-called risks of giftedness, such as social isolation, de-motivation, commitment issues/problems, and deliberate underachievement. Research has shown that highly gifted children are different not only because of higher IQ scores, but that there are cognitive differences in the ways that they think, learn, and relate to others. HGM schools bring together specialized teachers and compatible peers to give these children the challenge and support they need to develop to their maximum potential.

== Eligibility ==
Eligibility to most HGMs is restricted to students who test at least in the 99.5th percentile on an intellectual giftedness assessment conducted by an LAUSD psychologist (equivalent to IQ of 140+/-5). Priority is given to students with 99.9%, officially "Highly Gifted" by LAUSD definition (IQ 150+/-5). If there are openings remaining, students with 99.5%-99.8% (considered "Highly Gifted Applicable") can be admitted. Priority within the HG-Applicable group is not based on IQ score but rather on Magnet points. IQ testing and eligibility is determined by the LAUSD's GATE (Gifted and Talented) office. Parents may request an IQ test by contacting the GATE Coordinator at their LAUSD school, but would need to justify why they believe their children may be highly gifted, above normal levels of giftedness that can be identified by the OLSAT test (see next paragraph).

Beginning in 2011, all LAUSD second graders were given the OLSAT, an "ability test" (not IQ test) which may qualify students for regular Gifted/High Ability programs but NOT for Highly Gifted programs. If parents believe the OLSAT does not adequately reflect their child's intellectual capacity or that they need the higher challenge and social clustering of a Highly Gifted program, they can still request an IQ/intellectual assessment by contacting the GATE Coordinator at their school.

Students must be currently enrolled in a LAUSD school to be eligible for LAUSD-administered testing. Students in LAUSD-affiliated charter schools are also eligible for testing but the school needs to pay LAUSD $75 per test because the school already received funds that would normally be allocated to LAUSD's GATE program. In all cases, families will need to justify why they believe their children may be highly gifted, above normal levels of giftedness that can be identified by the OLSAT test (see above paragraph).

== Admission ==
Admission is usually through online eCHOICES Magnet applications, which are open around October–November for admission the following September. Students must already have been tested and officially identified as eligible for their application to go through. Eligible students might also enroll during the school year if the HGM has openings. To do this, parents must contact the Magnet Coordinator at the HGM school.

Because these are unusual programs in their curriculum, pedagogy and community, HGM schools highly recommend touring their classes before applying.

School bus transportation is available for students who live a certain distance from campus. Many students commute from great distances to attend HGM schools.

== Participating schools ==
Elementary:

- San Jose HGM, Mission Hills
- Eagle Rock HGM, Eagle Rock

Middle School:

- Portola HGM, Tarzana

High School:

- North Hollywood HGM, North Hollywood

== Notable alumni ==
- Andrei Cherny '93 (author, politician)
- Lenora Claire (media personality)
- Jonah Lehrer (author)
- Stephen Stromberg (Journalist)
- Morgan Webb '96 (TV personality)
- Lauren Woodland '95 (Emmy Award nominated actress)
- Ernestine Fu '09 (venture capitalist)
- Michael Elowitz '85 (synthetic biologist)
- Mayim Bialik '93 (actress)
