= Magnolia Public Schools =

Charter school organization in California

Magnolia Public Schools is an American nonprofit organization running 13 public charter schools in California, United States. The organization focuses on STEM, which includes Science, Technology, Engineering, and Math, because these subjects are believed to be in high demand for future careers. Students are offered various electives, such as Robotics Club, Chess Tournaments, and Math Tournaments, to enrich their studies. MPS's demographics consist primarily of low-income and minority students from kindergarten to 12th grade. Two of their schools are statewide benefit charter schools.

== History ==
Magnolia Public Schools was founded in August of 1997 under the name of The Magnolia Educational & Research Foundation. MPS opened its first school, known as Magnolia Science Academy-1 in 2002.
