= Winfred J. Sanborn =

American politician (1869–1947)

Winfred Joseph Sanborn
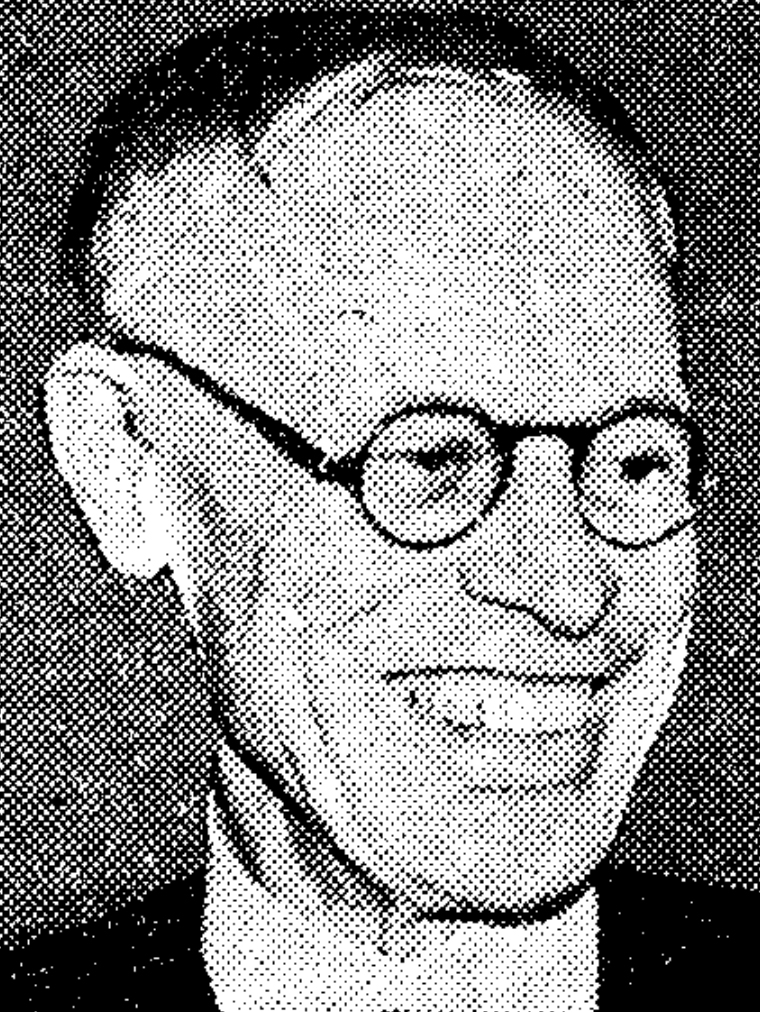
- Sanborn in 1937

President of the Los Angeles City Council
- In office July 1, 1929 – June 30, 1931
- Preceded by: William G. Bonelli
- Succeeded by: Charles Hiram Randall

Member of the Los Angeles City Council from the 9th district
- In office July 1, 1925 – June 30, 1931
- Preceded by: Constituency established
- Succeeded by: George W. C. Baker
- In office September 20, 1937 – June 30, 1939
- Preceded by: Howard E. Dorsey
- Succeeded by: Parley Parker Christensen

Member of the Los Angeles City Council for the at-large district
- In office July 7, 1919 – June 30, 1925

Personal details
- Born: December 2, 1869 Windsor, Missouri
- Died: 1947 (aged 77–78)
- Political party: Republican
- Spouse: Mary "Mamie" Myrtella Willey (m. 1894)
- Children: 2

Winfred Joseph Sanborn (December 2, 1869 – 1947) was on the Los Angeles City Council under an at-large election system from 1919 until a new city charter was adopted in 1925, when representation was changed to a fifteen-district system. Sanborn served the new Ninth District from 1925 until 1931, and then, when Councilman Howard E. Dorsey was killed in a motor accident in 1937, he was appointed to serve two more years.

== Biography ==
Sanborn, the second son of Alfred Hines Sanborn and Mary Lavinia Sawyer, was born December 2, 1869, near Windsor, Missouri. In 1884 he moved with his family to Los Angeles. In 1894, he married Mary "Mamie" Myrtella Willey, a native of that city. The couple settled near his parents in Boyle Heights and had two children, Lynn Durrell Sanborn and Olive May Sanborn Burris.

Sanborn worked for the U. S. Postal Service from 1888 until 1910, when he joined Pierce Brothers undertakers as bookkeeper, credit manager and part owner.

He and his family were pioneers in the resort community of Camp Baldy, later Mount Baldy Village, in the San Gabriel Mountains. The Sanborns were camping there as early as 1897. A small stone cabin they built in 1910 still stands as the oldest structure in town. In 1912 Sanborn constructed a larger cabin, which stood until the 1970s, when it was removed to expand the ranger station. The station is situated on Sanborn Avenue.

Sanborn, a Republican, belonged to the Maccabees, the Elks Club and the Masons. He was on the board of governors of the Whittier Boulevard YMCA.

== City Council ==
=== At-large councilman ===
Sanborn's motive in running for city council in 1919 was to improve transportation from East Los Angeles to downtown, which required building new crossings of the Los Angeles River and the adjacent railroad tracks. The only candidate from the Boyle Heights area, he placed third of seventeen in the race, with nine elected. Council President Boyle Workman appointed him chairman of the Public Safety Committee and member of the Public Health and Sanitation and Public Utilities committees. Sanborn later also served on the Public Works and the Efficiency and Supply committees.

=== District 9 councilman ===
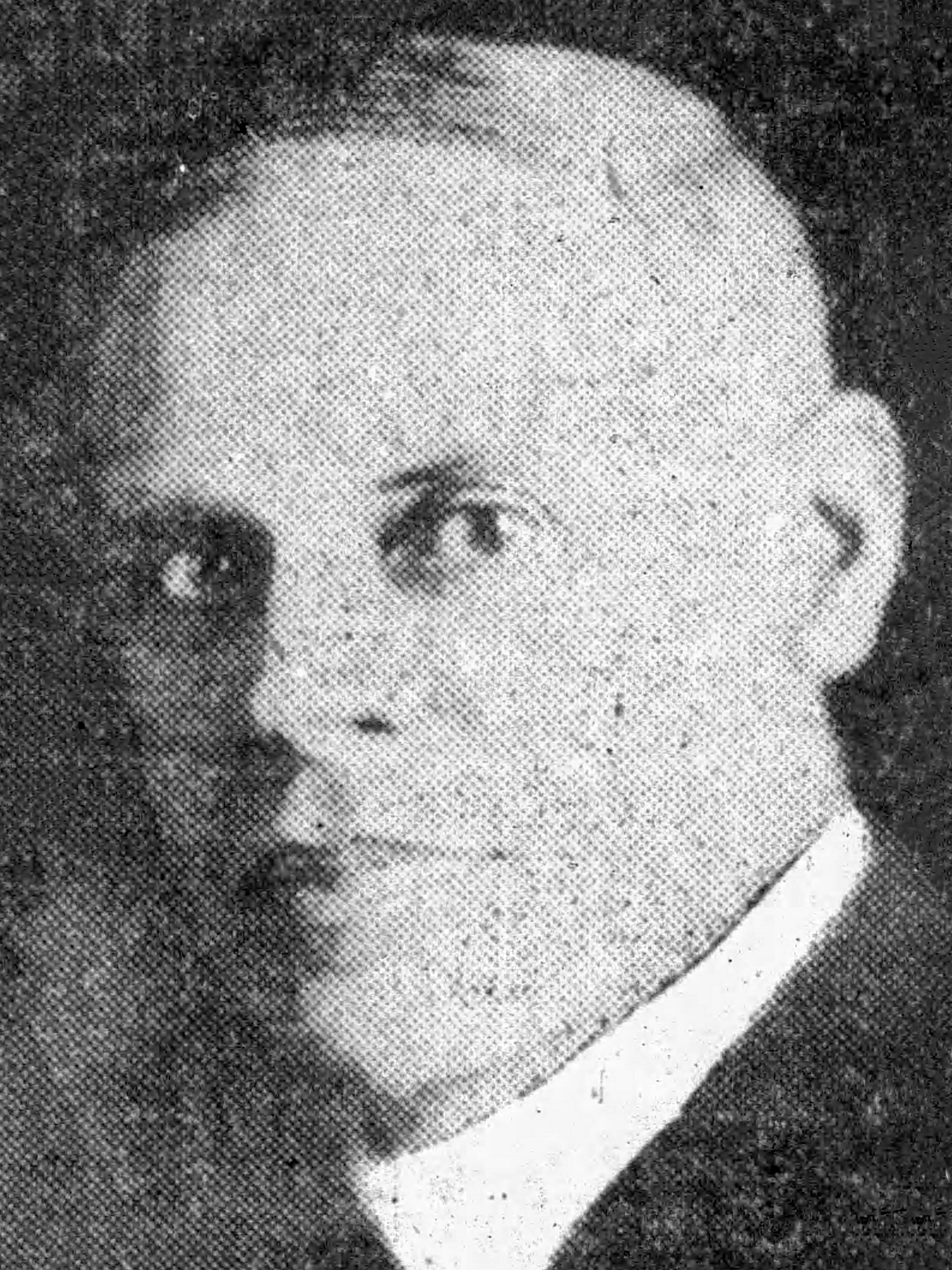
Sanford as a city councilmember in 1925.

In 1925, the city charter was amended to provide for district elections. During Sanborn's first six terms, his chief accomplishment was the financing and building of six viaducts for traffic to cross the railroads and the Los Angeles River without the need to stop for trains. His first attempt with a $1 million bond issue failed on 1921 ballot. Sanborn was determined that the entire city should pay for the work, rather than only East Los Angeles by special assessment. He negotiated a funding plan with Los Angeles County and the railroad companies, who gained some new right-of-ways, and a $2 million bond issue was approved by voters in 1923. An additional $500,000 bond passed in 1925. During the following term, Sanborn became the chairman of a new Tunnels, Bridges and Viaducts Committee. The Ninth Street viaduct was completed in 1926, followed by viaducts for Macy, Seventh, Fourth, First and Aliso streets. All but the last were completed before Sanborn left office for the first time in 1931.

Sanborn also negotiated with the Santa Fe Railroad for the elimination of daylight switching along the Slauson Avenue right-of-way, with the railroad in return getting approval for a franchise for its Los Angeles Harbor extension. Sanborn secured considerable public works for his district, including the Evergreen playground, 200 new street lights, additional fire stations and personnel, tripling of police personnel, and a million dollars in street improvements. He served on the Los Angeles County Grade Crossing Commission and the Los Angeles Traffic Commission.

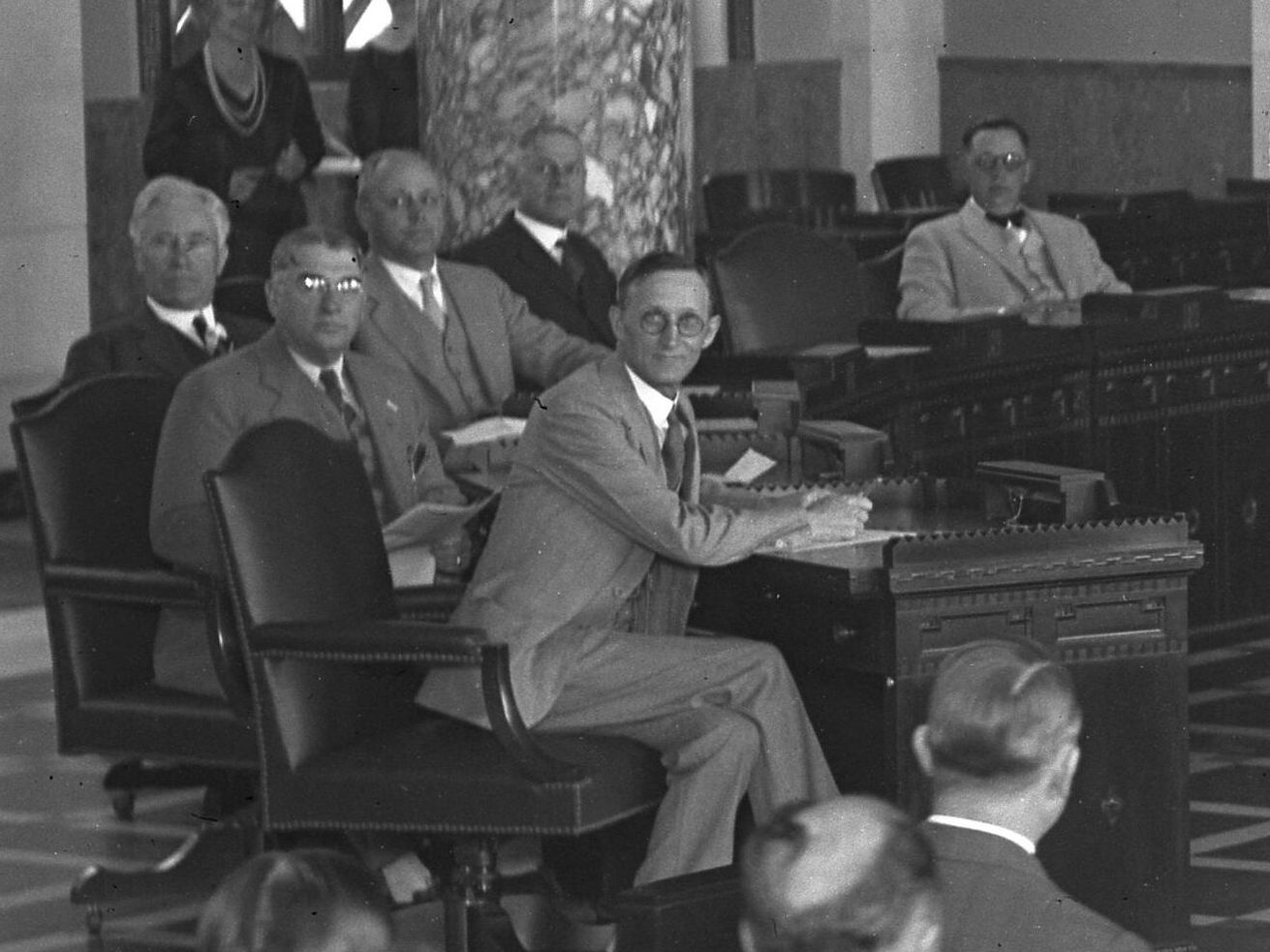
Sanborn (center at back) in the Los Angeles City Council in 1928.

Sanborn was unanimously elected president of the council in 1929–30, and, as such, he became acting mayor when Mayor John C. Porter took a trip to Europe in 1931. In this capacity he headed the Los Angeles welcoming party for Nobuhito, Prince Takamatsu of Japan, and his new wife, Lady Kikuko Tokugawa. Also during Sanborn's time as acting mayor, the Supreme Court gave authority to the State Railroad Commission to require the three railroads serving Los Angeles to collectively build one Union Station, which greatly improved traffic by eliminating twenty grade crossings and all train traffic from Alameda Street.

The main issue of the 1931 election was utilities, with Mayor Porter favoring the private utilities, Southern California Edison and Los Angeles Gas and Electric, and his opponents in the Municipal Light and Power Defense League pushing for more public ownership. Sanborn was not firmly in either camp, but he did vote to confirm the mayor's appointments to the Board of Water and Power, so he was targeted by the opposition. The campaign against Sanborn and others was rife with dirty tactics, partly stemming from the opposition of Police Chief James Davis. City Attorney Erwin (Pete) Werner, and his wife, Helen, also opposed him. As a result, Sanborn lost the next election to George W. C. Baker.

In August 1937 Councilman Howard E. Dorsey died in an automobile accident, and the council appointed Sanborn to replace him in the Ninth District. It took 48 ballots for the council to choose Sanborn. Sanborn ran for the council spot in 1939, but although he was neither endorsed nor opposed by the reform slate of Judge Fletcher Bowron, running for mayor, Sanborn fell a victim to the anti-incumbent mood of the voters and was defeated.

Preceded by Constituency established	Los Angeles City Council; 9th District; 1925–31	Succeeded by George W. C. Baker
Preceded by Howard E. Dorsey	Los Angeles City Council; 9th District; 1937–1939	Succeeded by Parley Parker Christensen
Preceded by William G. Bonelli	President of the Los Angeles City Council; 1929-1931	Succeeded by Charles Hiram Randall
