= Edward R. Roybal =

Mexican-American politician (1916–2005)

Ed Roybal
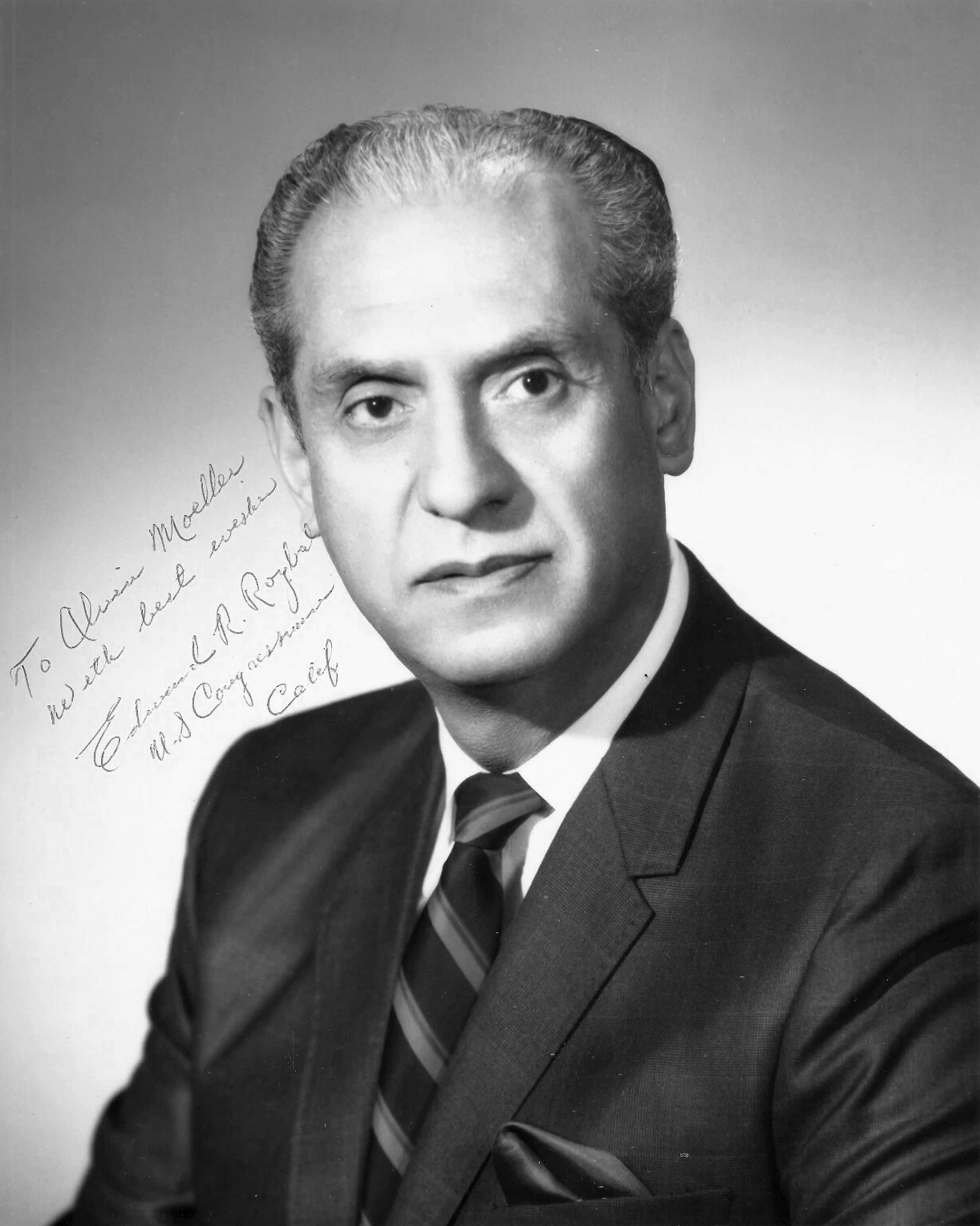
- Roybal c. 1971

Member of the U.S. House of Representatives from California
- In office January 3, 1963 – January 3, 1993
- Preceded by: Gordon L. McDonough (redistricted)
- Succeeded by: Xavier Becerra (redistricted)
- Constituency: 30th district (1963–1975); 25th district (1975–1993)

Member of the Los Angeles City Council from the 9th district
- In office July 1, 1949 – December 31, 1962
- Preceded by: Parley P. Christensen
- Succeeded by: Gil Lindsay

Personal details
- Born: Edward Ross Roybal; February 10, 1916 Pecos, New Mexico, U.S.
- Died: October 24, 2005 (aged 89) Pasadena, California, U.S.
- Party: Democratic
- Spouse: Lucille Beserra
- Children: 3, including Lucille
- Education: University of California, Los Angeles (attended); Southwestern University (attended)

Military service
- Allegiance: United States
- Branch/service: United States Army
- Battles/wars: World War II
- Roybal's voice Roybal on proposed amendments to the Immigration Reform and Control Act of 1986. Recorded October 1, 1986

Edward Ross Roybal (February 10, 1916 – October 24, 2005) was an American politician. A member of the Democratic Party, he was the first Latino American to be elected to the Los Angeles City Council, serving from 1949 to 1962. He later served 15 terms in the U.S. House of Representatives from 1963 to 1993 and was the first Latino from California elected to Congress since 1879. He used his positions on the Appropriations Committee and as a ranking member on the Labor, Health, and Human Services and Education Subcommittee to be an advocate for the underrepresented and those in need. He concentrated his efforts on legislation on funding for health, education, community health programs and bilingual education.

== Early life ==
Roybal was born on February 10, 1916 in Albuquerque, Bernalilo County, New Mexico. He was one of ten children born to Baudilio Roybal, a carpenter, and Eloisa (Tafoya) Roybal. His family traced back eight generations to when the Spanish had control of the area. Roybal's family moved to Boyle Heights, Los Angeles when Roybal was six years old. After graduating from Roosevelt High School in 1934, Roybal joined the Civilian Conservation Corps (CCC) through a New Deal program, which marked the start of his public service journey. After serving in the CCC, Roybal studied accounting and business administration at UCLA, and later law at Southwestern Law School.

The death of multiple family members during the 1918 flu epidemic was a driving force behind his early interest and involvement in public health issues. He was an educator with the California Tuberculosis Association from 1942, although his work was interrupted due to the Second World War, where Roybal served as an accountant for an infantry unit in the U.S. Army from 1944 to 1945.

On September 27, 1940, he married Lucille Beserra, and they went on to have three children together: Lucille, Lillian, and Edward Jr.

== City Council (1949-1962) ==
=== Elections ===
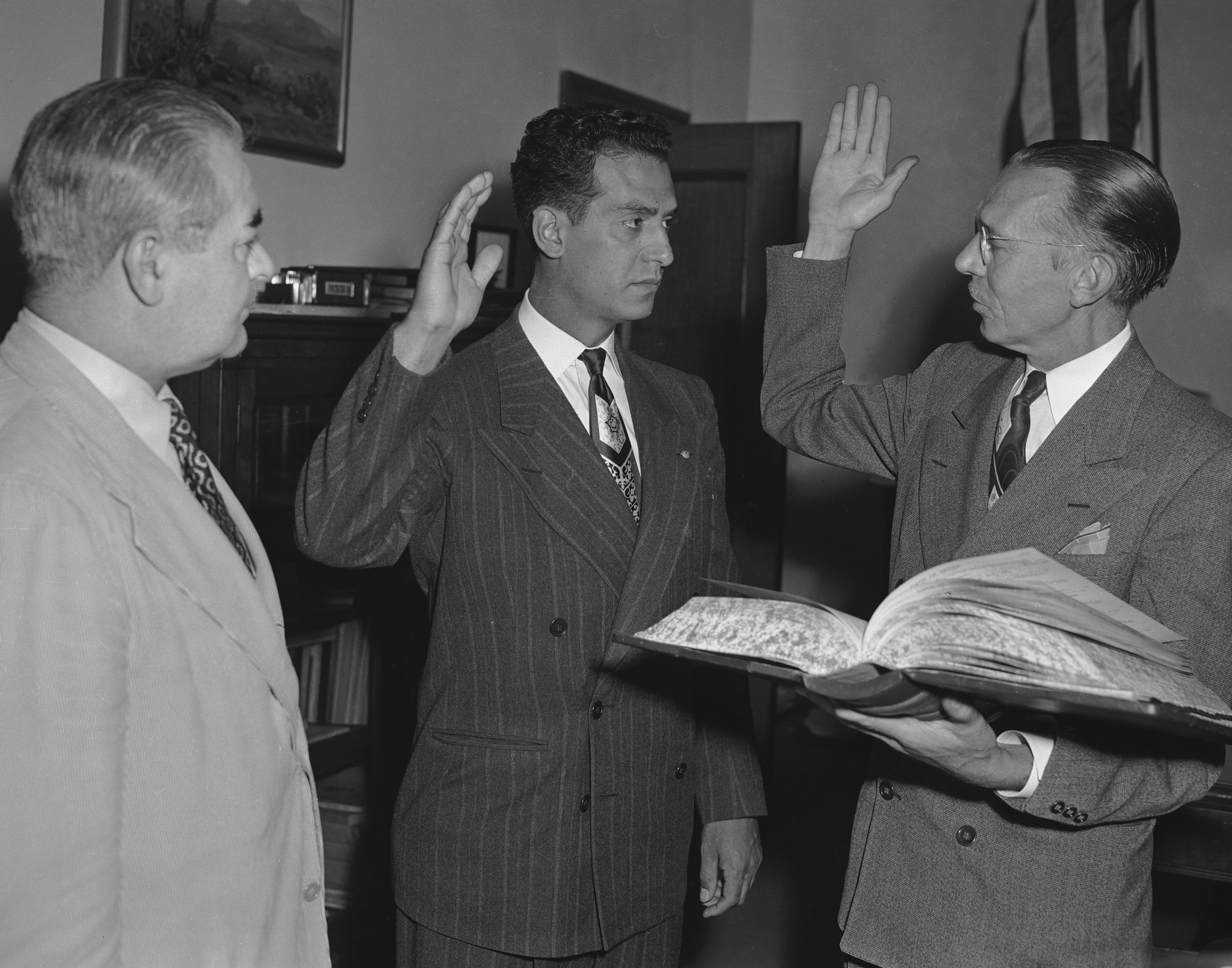
Roybal being sworn in as council member by Walter C. Peterson as fellow member Ed J. Davenport watches, 1949.

Upon returning home from the war, he was director of health education for the Los Angeles County Tuberculosis and Health Association, a position he held until 1949. In 1947, Roybal ran to fill the Los Angeles City Council District 9 seat held by Parley Parker Christensen. He was not elected, but ran again in 1949, It failed, however, and in 1949, Roybal, Fred Ross, and Anthony "Tony" P. Ríos founded the Community Service Organization (CSO). The CSO became the core of Roybal's political platform. Roybal's presence as president of the organization, Saul Alinsky's urging, and the support of local labor unions and several newspapers contributed to Roybal's victory against Christensen in the runoff election, for a two-year term. He was reelected in every vote thereafter until leaving office in 1962 after 13 years, He was president pro tempore in his last term.

Newly elected Roybal had prepared a self-introductory speech for his first council meeting. At the meeting, Roybal was introduced as "our new Mexican councilman who also speaks Mexican". He discarded his prepared speech, and instead defended his heritage and language. "I'm not Mexican, I am a Mexican-American. And I don't speak a word of Mexican. I speak Spanish." The experience realized his need to educate fellow public officials and to concentrate his efforts on the neglected needs of his Latino constituencies.

=== Positions ===
Roybal was noted as "often the spokesman for minority groups" in the City Council and "recognized leader of East Side minority groups." He was also seen as a "consistent supporter" of subsidized low-cost public housing.

Los Angeles Police. Roybal was a harsh critic of the Los Angeles Police Department for its brutality and treatment of minorities.

Subversive Registration Bill, 1950. In the midst of the Cold War, Roybal cast the sole negative vote against an ordinance that required "Communists and other subversives" to register with the police, and would require written loyalty oaths. He was critical of the House Un-American Activities Committee. The bill was later ruled unconstitutional by the Supreme Court. He told the council he believed he was "signing a political death warrant" with his vote, adding that the law "places every citizen and organization . . . at the mercy of any biased crackpot who may decide to report the matter to the Police Department as subversive."

Juveniles, 1950. The council adopted a motion by Don A. Allen asking the Police Department what was being done to enforce curfew laws. Allen said it was his opinion that if policemen were "equipped with a good old-fashioned hair brush, which could be applied to some of these kids," there might be a lessening of juvenile crime. But Roybal disagreed, noting that most of the "hoodlums" were over 21 and recommending closer cooperation by the police with agencies "dealing with youth problems."

Bloody Christmas, 1951. Roybal addressed police brutality following an incident at the Central City jail on Christmas eve of 1951, in which 7 men were beaten by about 50 officers. He spoke at a Police Commission hearing, which his fellow CSO co-founder Anthony Ríos publicly acknowledged him for "sticking out his neck". February of 1952, Roybal brough to the Council's attention that he received additional allegations of police brutality, about 50 complaints in the last 3 months. The problem extended beyond his Eastside district and he called on Police Chief William H. Parker to take action, but received no answer.

Rabies, 1953. He and his public health and welfare committee supported proposed legislation requiring all dogs to be vaccinated against rabies.

Chavez Ravine, 1957. Roybal led the opposition to a land swap undertaken by Los Angeles that allowed Dodger Stadium to built in Chavez Ravine, which was a majority Mexican-American community. He favored the minor league park at Wrigley Field. His daughter Rep. Lucille Roybal- Allard recalled, "One man said my father was un-American because he was against baseball and the Dodgers. I was a young girl at the time, and I tried to convince the man that my dad was right. I wasn't able to." Roybal protested on behalf of the Chavez Ravine residents. Families were forcefully evicted and removed, such as the Arechiga family, whose home they occupied in Chavez Ravine was bulldozed. "The eviction in itself was legal," Roybal told newsmen, "but the manner in which it was carried out certainly was not. Someone stands to answer for violating the individual rights of these people. This is the type of action that occurred during the Spanish inquisition and Hitler's Germany. But never have I heard of anything like this taking place in this city."

Edward R. Roybal (right center, crouched) stands with families who lost their homes in Chavez Ravine, 1959

Employment, 1958. He voted in favor of establishing a Fair Employment Practices Commission for the city. The bid lost on a 7–7 tie vote.

Bunker Hill, 1959. Roybal threatened a filibuster when the council would not accede to a request he made for monthly reports on the fate of residents evicted from Bunker Hill to make room for a massive improvement project.

Apology, 1960. Before and during a City Council meeting, he demanded an apology from Police Chief William H. Parker for Parker's having condemned some Latino residents of East Los Angeles as "not too far removed from the wild tribes of the inner mountains of Mexico. I don't think you can throw the genes out of the question when you discuss the behavior patterns of people." Parker made the statement at a hearing before the U.S. Commission on Civil Rights; he refused to apologize but said that the word "wild" was ill-advised.

=== Statewide ===
During his time on the City Council, Roybalwas encouraged to run for higher office. In 1954, he ran for lieutenant governor, losing to Republican incumbent Harold J. Powers, who had been appointed to the position after Lieutenant Governor Goodwin Knight acceded to the governorship after Earl Warren was named Chief Justice of the United States, by 1,764,035 votes (44.66%) to 2,185,918 (55.34%).

== U.S. House of Representatives (1963-1993) ==
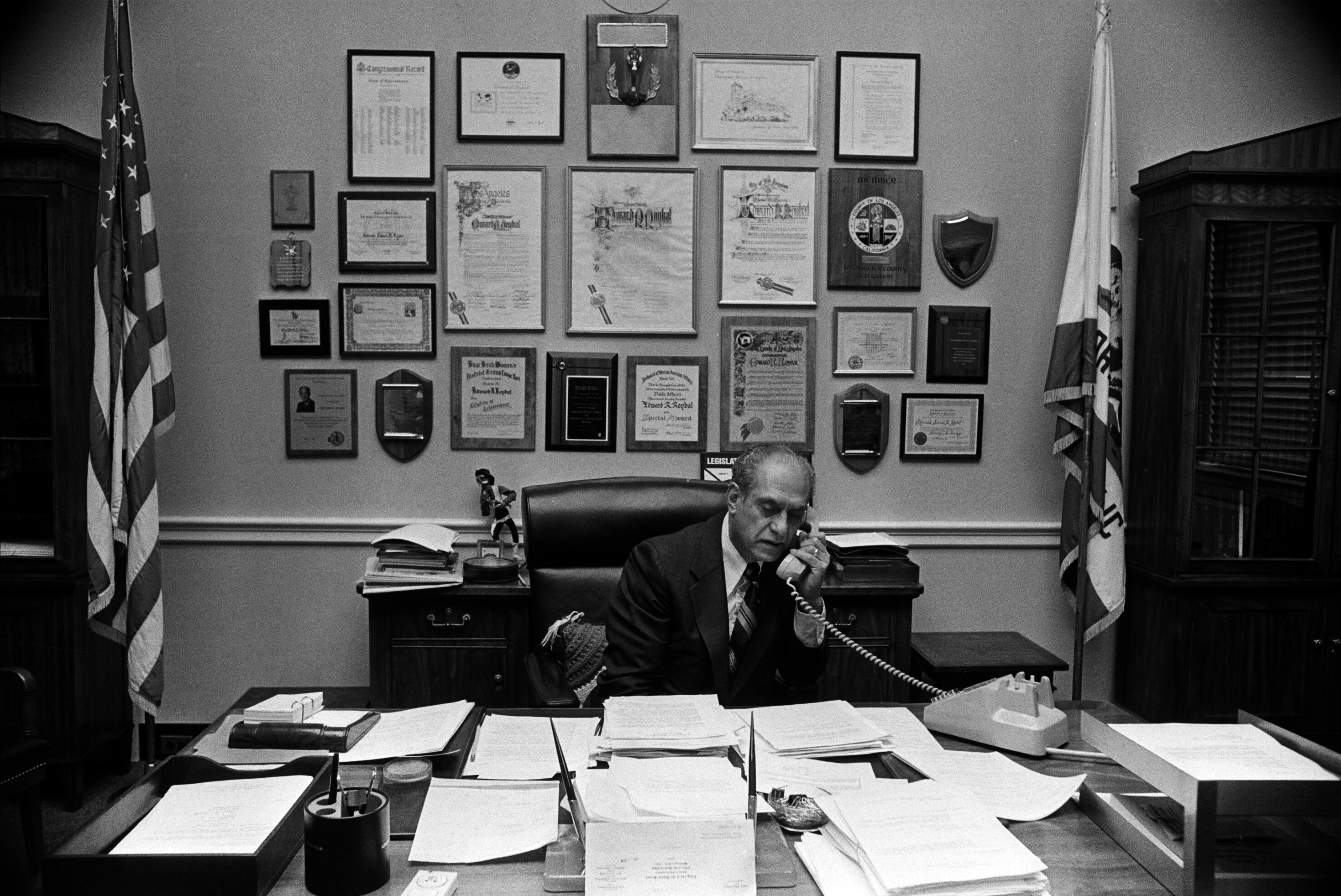
Roybal speaking on the phone, 1977.

In 1962, Roybal ran for the new 30th District seat which spanned his Eastside council district, downtown Los Angeles, and parts of Hollywood. His platform consisted of issues such as job security, education, and housing. The California Eagle endorsed him by saying, "Mr. Roybal has waged a long fight in City Council to protect his constituents...he was the only member of the Council to protest against this year's gerrymander which deprives Negroes of a seat in the Council. No person in California has done more than he to further civil rights. His defeat would be a calamity." He won the Democratic nomination by a three to one margin, and was endorsed by President John F. Kennedy.

Roybal voted in favor of the Civil Rights Act of 1964, Civil Rights Act of 1968, and the Voting Rights Act of 1965.

In 1967 he wrote and proposed a bilingual education act, the first of its kind, which passed as the Bilingual Education Act in 1968. The law made it mandatory for children from immigrant families or from non English-speaking homes to attend English classes rather than getting sent to remedial courses.

He served on the House Appropriations Committee starting in 1971. In 1976, he became a founder of the Congressional Hispanic Caucus (CHC) and later co-founded the National Association of Latino Elected and Appointed Officials. In 1986, as chair of the Congressional Hispanic Caucus, he led the unsuccessful opposition to the Simpson-Mazzoli Act.

Roybal supported federal funding for AIDS-related efforts. In 1983 he helped secure an additional $8 million for the Reagan administration's AIDS efforts, and later proposed raising the funds to $176 million. He received backlash from some constituents, who questioned the need for AIDS funding in East Los Angeles due to its association with gay men.

=== Koreagate ===
In August of 1978, Roybal was involved in a vote-buying investigation known as the Koreagate scandal, in which he failed to properly report to the House Ethics Committee a gift of $1000 from a South Korean lobbyist, Tongsun Park. The House Ethics Committee charged Roybal with four violations of the Code of Official Conduct of the House of Representatives for giving false testimony. The committee found him guilty on three of four accounts, which were that he failed to report the cash contribution, that he used the gift from Park for his own use, and that he gave "testimony which he did not believe to be true", when he denied under oath that the got the contribution. They unanimously decided a formal censure, the second most severe punishment under House rules. Roybal said he had "too much respect to willfully or intentionally lie."

Roybal's constituents and House democrats were angered, and agreed the punishment was far more harsh than that of other two white members from California, Charles H. Wilson and John McFall, who were part of the same investigation and found guilty of taking the money. Requests by Hispanic leaders, and testimony by Representatives Ronald Dellums and Phillip Burton as to the facts of the case, as well as many representatives who spoke against the Ethics Committee recommendation for censure, resulted in the potential censure being reduced to a reprimand (the same punishment given the other two Representatives involved). In a letter dated November 29, 1978, Thomas H. Henderson Jr., Chief of the Public Integrity Section, stated that "The House Committee found that this change of testimony and other facts testified to on April 25, 1978, concerning the incident was not intentionally untruthful as originally charged." Undeterred, Roybal ran for reelection the same year and won 70% of the vote.

== Death and Legacy ==
Roybal retired from Congress in 1993. Him and his wife Lucille founded the Edward Roybal Foundation, which provides scholarships for Latinos pursuing higher education in fields relating to health. They lived in Pasadena where they continued to be involved with politics by endorsing local candidates. His daughter, Lucille Roybal-Allard became the representative for his 33rd District. Roybal endorsed Xavier Becerra, who became the representative for the 30th district.

Roybal died of respiratory failure on October 24th, 2005 at Huntington Hospital in Pasadena at 89 years old.

In 2008, the high school previously known as the Belmont Learning Center, was renamed as the Edward R. Roybal Learning Center by Los Angeles Unified officials.

In August 2022, the Roybal School of Film and Television Production Magnet opened, housed within the Edward R. Roybal Learning Center, aiming to provide a conduit for students from underrepresented backgrounds to gain below-the-line employment in the film and television sector, in fields such as lighting, cinematography and editing. The school arose from an initiative by George Clooney and Grant Heslov.

Every February, on or near Roybal's birthday, the National Association of Latino Elected and Appointed Officials (NALEO) hosts the Edward R. Roybal Legacy Gala in Washington, D.C., as a tribute to the contributions he made to the nation, to NALEO and to the NALEO Educational Fund, of which he was the Founder Emeritus. Congressmen are awarded the Edward R. Roybal Award for Outstanding Public Service for efforts considered positive for Hispanic-American advancement.

The Metro Gold Line Edward R. Roybal Linea de Oro Eastside Extension opened in November 2009. It runs through East Los Angeles from Union Station to Atlantic.

He was awarded a posthumous Presidential Medal of Freedom by President Barack Obama on November 24, 2014.

== Electoral history ==
Ed Roybal electoral history

1962 United States House of Representatives elections in California
Party	Candidate	Votes	%
Democratic	Edward R. Roybal	69,008	56.5
Republican	Gordon L. McDonough (Incumbent)	53,104	43.5
Total votes		122,112	100.0
Democratic gain from Republican			

1964 United States House of Representatives elections in California
Party	Candidate	Votes	%
Democratic	Edward R. Roybal (Incumbent)	90,329	66.3
Republican	Alfred J. Feder	45,912	33.7
Total votes		136,241	100.0
Democratic hold			

1966 United States House of Representatives elections in California
Party	Candidate	Votes	%
Democratic	Edward R. Roybal (Incumbent)	72,173	66.4
Republican	Henri O'Bryant Jr.	36,506	33.6
Total votes		108,679	100.0
Democratic hold			

1968 United States House of Representatives elections in California
Party	Candidate	Votes	%
Democratic	Edward R. Roybal (Incumbent)	75,381	67.5
Republican	Samuel F. Cavnar	36,312	32.5
Total votes		111,693	100.0
Democratic hold			

1970 United States House of Representatives elections in California
Party	Candidate	Votes	%
Democratic	Edward R. Roybal (Incumbent)	63,903	68.3
Republican	Samuel F. Cavnar	28,038	29.9
American Independent	Boris Belousov	1,681	1.8
Total votes		93,622	100.0
Democratic hold			

1972 United States House of Representatives elections in California
Party	Candidate	Votes	%
Democratic	Edward R. Roybal (Incumbent)	76,521	68.4
Republican	Bill Brophy	32,005	28.6
Peace and Freedom	Lewis McCammon	3,355	3.0
Total votes		111,881	100.0
Democratic hold			

1974 election
Party	Candidate	Votes	%
Democratic	Edward R. Roybal (Incumbent)	43,998	100.0
Turnout			
Democratic gain from Republican			

1976 election
Party	Candidate	Votes	%
Democratic	Edward R. Roybal (Incumbent)	57,966	71.9
Republican	Robert K. Watson	17,737	22.0
Peace and Freedom	Marilyn Se	4,922	6.1
Total votes		80,625	100.0
Turnout			
Democratic hold			

1978 election
Party	Candidate	Votes	%
Democratic	Edward R. Roybal (Incumbent)	45,881	67.4
Republican	Robert K. Watson	22,205	32.6
Total votes		68,086	100.0
Turnout			
Democratic hold			

1980 election
Party	Candidate	Votes	%
Democratic	Edward R. Roybal (Incumbent)	49,080	66.0
Republican	Richard E. Ferraro	21,116	28.4
Libertarian	William D. Mitchell	4,169	5.6
Total votes		74,365	100.0
Turnout			
Democratic hold			

1982 election
Party	Candidate	Votes	%
Democratic	Edward R. Roybal (Incumbent)	71,106	84.5
Libertarian	Daniel John Gorham	12,060	14.5
Total votes		83,166	100.0
Turnout			
Democratic hold			

1984 election
Party	Candidate	Votes	%
Democratic	Edward R. Roybal (Incumbent)	74,261	71.7
Republican	Roy D. "Bill" Bloxom	24,968	24.1
Libertarian	Anthony G. Bajada	4,370	4.2
Total votes		103,599	100.0
Turnout			
Democratic hold			

1986 election
Party	Candidate	Votes	%
Democratic	Edward R. Roybal (Incumbent)	62,692	76.1
Republican	Gregory L. Hardy	17,558	21.3
Libertarian	Ted Brown	2,163	2.6
Total votes		82,413	100.0
Turnout			
Democratic hold			

1988 election
Party	Candidate	Votes	%
Democratic	Edward R. Roybal (Incumbent)	85,378	85.5
Peace and Freedom	Paul Reyes	8,746	8.8
Libertarian	John C. Thie	5,752	5.8
Total votes		98,876	100.0
Turnout			
Democratic hold			

1990 election
Party	Candidate	Votes	%
Democratic	Edward R. Roybal (Incumbent)	48,120	70.0
Republican	Steven J. Renshaw	17,021	24.8
Libertarian	Robert H. Scott	3,576	5.2
Total votes		68,717	100.0
Turnout			
Democratic hold			

== See also ==
- List of federal political scandals in the United States
- List of Hispanic and Latino Americans in the United States Congress
- List of United States representatives expelled, censured, or reprimanded

== Other references ==
- National Association of Latino Elected and Appointed Officials (NALEO) Educational Fund
- John P. Schmal, "Fracturing the Chicano Vote in California," LatinoLA, July 20, 2005, citing (1) Mexican American Legal Defense and Educational Fund and William C. Velasquez Institute, "California Congressional Redistricting Plan," at http://www.maldef.org/publications/pdf/Congressional_Plan_Supplement.pdf, (2) Richard Santillan, "California Reapportionment and the Chicano Community: An Historical Overview 1960-1980," in The Chicano Community and California Redistricting, Vol. I, Rose Institute of State and Local Government, Claremont Men's College, 1981, (3) Richard Santillan,Chicano Politics: La Raza Unida (Los Angeles: Tlaquilo Publications, 1973), p. 11, and (4) Katherine Underwood "Pioneering Minority Representation: Edward Roybal and the Los Angeles City Council, 1949-1962," Pacific Historical Review, 1997.
- John P. Schmal, "Edward Roybal Was a Pioneer," LatinoLA, October 27, 2005, citing (1) Alford, Harold. "The Proud Peoples." New York: David McKay Co., 1972, (2) Diaz, Katherine A., "Congressman Edward Roybal: Los Angeles Before the 1960s," Caminos 4:7 (July–August 1983), (3) Underwood, Katherine. "Pioneering Minority Representation: Edward Roybal and the Los Angeles City Council, 1949-1962." Pacific Historical Review 66:3 (August 1997): 399–425, and (4) Library of Congress, "Hispanic Americans in Congress, 1822-1995: Edward R. Roybal," Online: https://www.loc.gov/rr/hispanic/congress/roybal.html

U.S. House of Representatives
Preceded by Bob Wilson	Member of the U.S. House of Representatives from California's 30th congressional district 1963–1975	Succeeded by George E. Danielson
Preceded by Charles E. Wiggins	Member of the U.S. House of Representatives from California's 25th congressional district 1975–1993	Succeeded by Buck McKeon
New office	Chair of the Congressional Hispanic Caucus; 1976–1981	Succeeded by Bob Garcia
Preceded by Claude Pepper	Chair of the House Aging Committee; 1983–1992	Position abolished
