= Howard E. Dorsey =

American politician and hydraulic engineer (1904-1937)

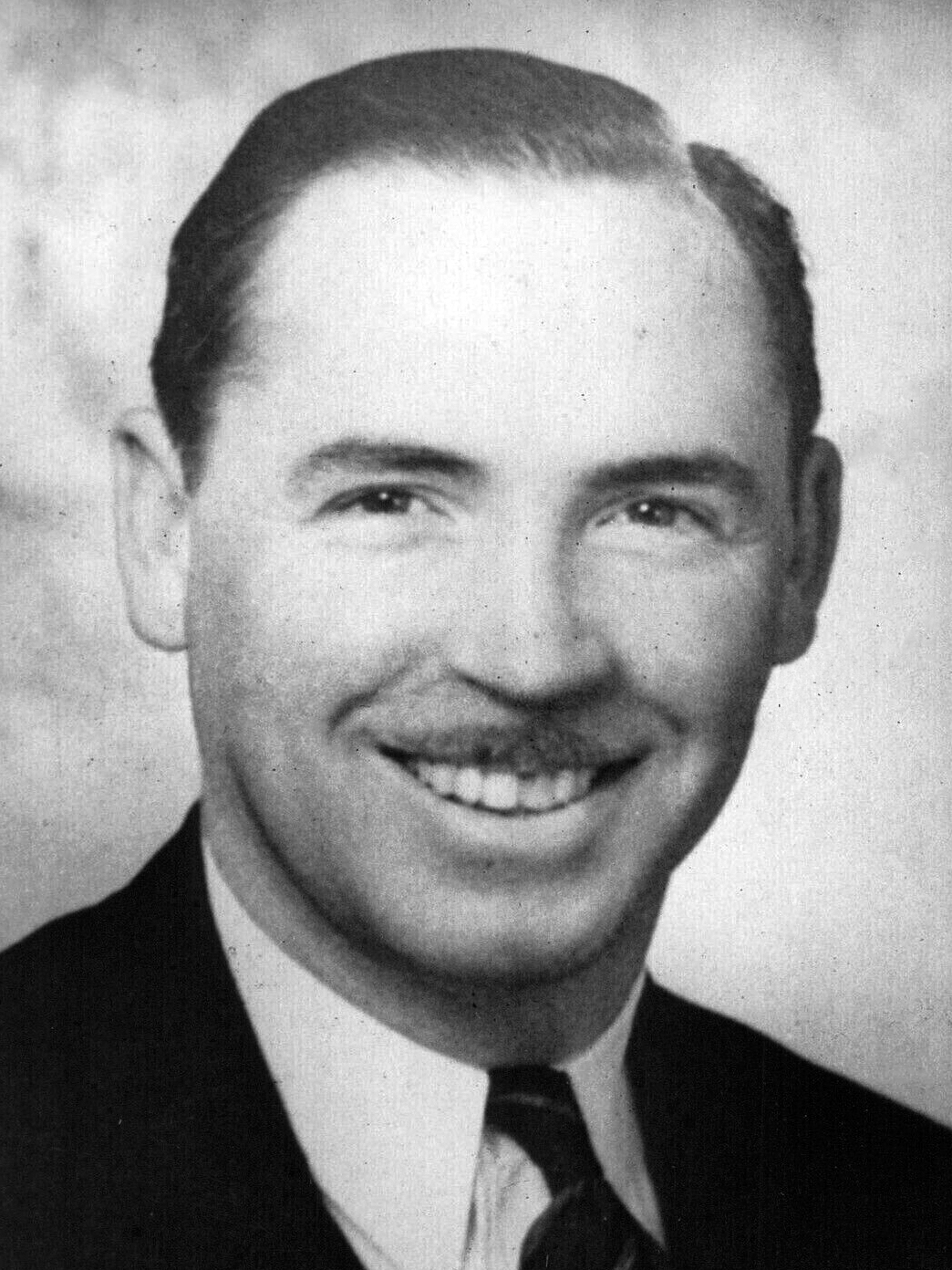
- Dorsey in 1937

Member of the Los Angeles City Council from the 9th District
- In office July 1, 1937 – August 7, 1937
- Preceded by: Parley P. Christensen
- Succeeded by: Winfred J. Sanborn

Personal details
- Born: June 10, 1904 Eastside Los Angeles
- Died: August 7, 1937 (aged 33) Angeles National Forest
- Party: Democratic
- Spouse: Edith Irene Wallin (m. 1930)
- Children: 2

Howard Edward Dorsey (July 10, 1904 – August 7, 1937) was a hydraulic engineer who was a member of the Los Angeles City Council in 1937. He was the only council member since at least 1925 to die in office from accidental death and the member to have served the fewest days in office.

== Biography ==
Dorsey was born July 10, 1904, in Eastside Los Angeles, the son of William Edward Dorsey of Pennellville, New York, and Berdena Cecelia Dales of Ohio. His father and grandfather were Los Angeles city police officers, and he was a nephew of Susan M. Dorsey, noted Los Angeles educator. He was educated in L.A. public schools in the Hollenbeck Heights district and graduated from Lincoln High School, after which, financing himself with odd jobs, he studied commercial law, banking and accounting and civil and hydraulic engineering at the American Institute in Los Angeles.

For 18 months he was "in charge of investigation" on the West Coast for the U.S. Treasury Department, and then for five years he was with the Bureau of Water and Power, when he was superintendent of construction, street, storm-drain and improvement work.

He was married in 1930 to Edith Irene Wallin of Minnesota. They had two sons, Howard Edward Jr. and Leroy.

He was a member of the Native Sons of the Golden West and the International Footprinters Association. He was a Protestant and a Democrat. His hobbies were fishing, golf and tennis. He lived at 2215 East Second Street in Boyle Heights.

Dorsey developed a "pre-delinquent detail program" used by the Los Angeles Police Department and involving "elimination from police records of first offences [sic] of a minor nature, voluntary probation and a cooperative remedial and adjustment program with a social agency." It was said that police officers from other cities were sent to Los Angeles to study its application.

== Death ==
Dorsey, 33, was killed in a "flaming automobile plunge" on August 7, 1937, when the car he was driving went over a 1,600-foot cliff at the edge of Rim of the World Highway in the Angeles National Forest on the way to Big Bear Valley. "Forty-foot skid marks . . . indicated that Dorsey apparently lost control of his machine." It went over a seven-foot embankment and into "one of the steepest canyons in the mountain area." The councilman's body was "flung out approximately 1,000 feet down the canyon wall." Trees were set alight by the burning gasoline, attracting the attention of motorists who notified authorities, who relied on a squad of California Conservation Corps youths to fight the blaze.

Dorsey was accompanied by Marion Gertrude Lonabaugh, 37, secretary to Councilman John W. Baumgartner; she died two hours after the accident.

A funeral service at Calvary Baptist Church conducted by H. M. S. Richards of the radio Voice of Prophecy attracted some thousand mourners. Burial followed in Evergreen Cemetery.

== City Council ==
In 1933, Dorsey was the manager of the unsuccessful campaign by Winfred J. Sanborn for election to the Los Angeles City Council in the 9th Councilmanic District against George W. C. Baker, and in 1935 Dorsey was a candidate himself for the same seat, losing to Parley Parker Christensen. He ran again in 1937, beating Jack Y. Berman in the runoff election "by a comfortable lead."

In the mid-1930s, the 9th District was generally bounded on the north by Alhambra Avenue; south, 25th Street; east, Indiana Avenue; and west, Figueroa Street.

Dorsey was considered a liberal and a progressive. In his few weeks on the council, he was able to speak once at a gathering of property owners and businessmen on the need for a junior college in East Los Angeles "to save students' transportation time and to lessen the traffic accident toll."

Preceded by Parley Parker Christensen	Los Angeles City Council; 9th District; 1937	Succeeded by Winfred J. Sanborn
