= 1920 United States presidential election in Washington (state) =

- November 2, 1920
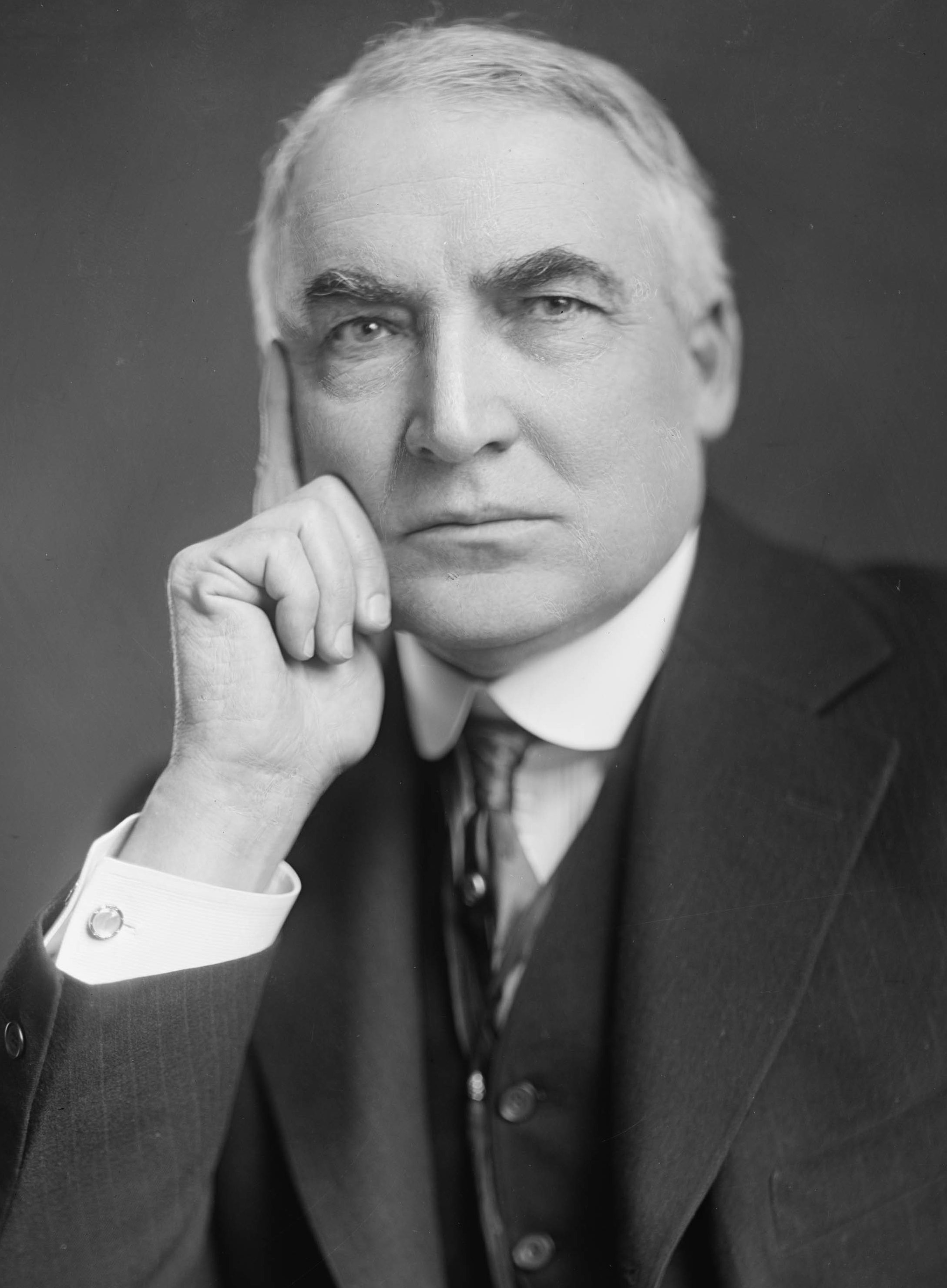

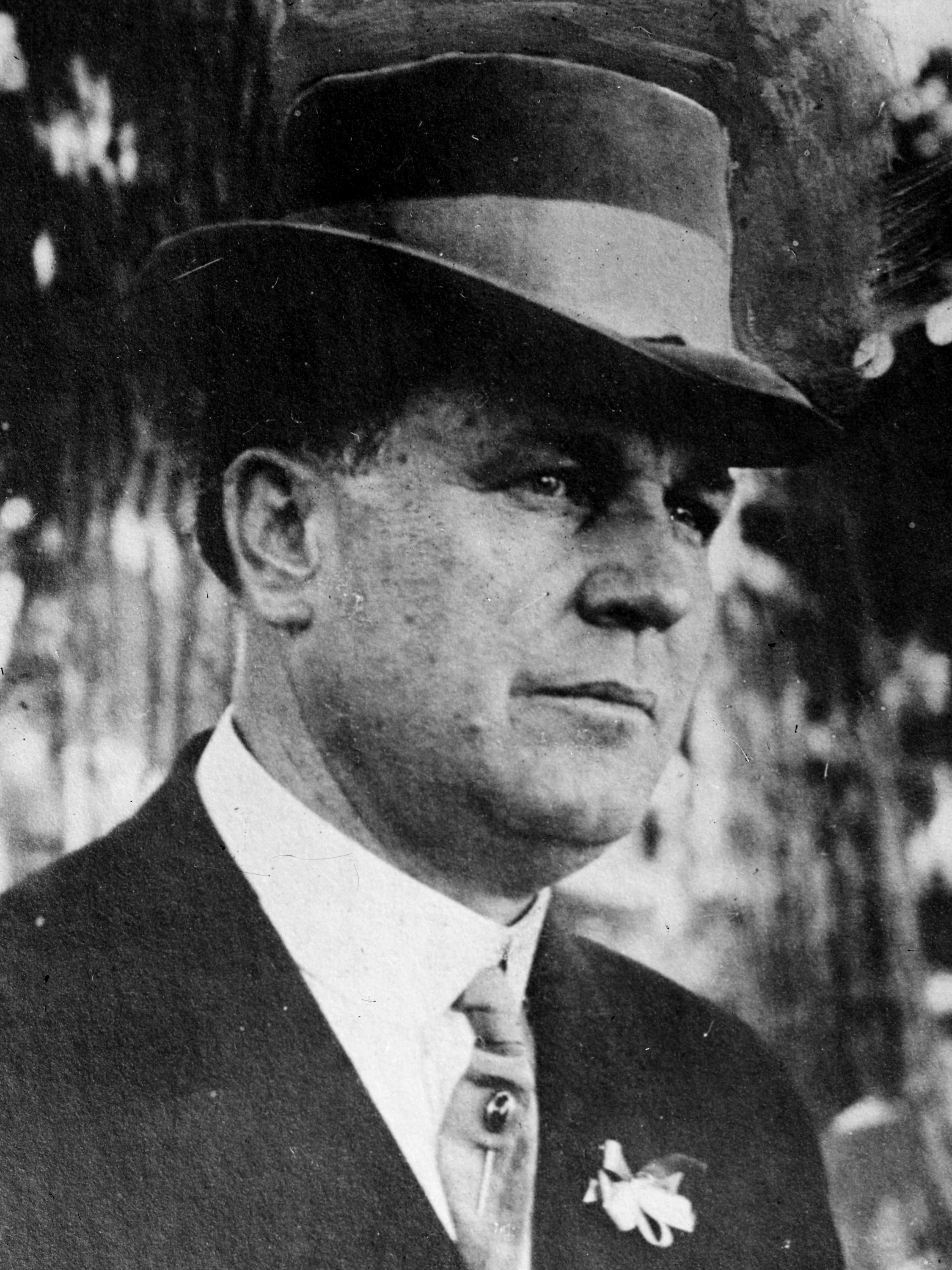
Nominee	Warren G. Harding	James M. Cox	Parley P. Christensen
Party	Republican	Democratic	Farmer–Labor
Home state	Ohio	Ohio	Illinois
Running mate	Calvin Coolidge	Franklin D. Roosevelt	Max S. Hayes
Electoral vote	7	0	0
Popular vote	223,137	84,298	77,246
Percentage	55.96%	21.14%	19.37%
County results
Harding
40–50%
50–60%
60–70%
President before election
Woodrow Wilson
Democratic
Elected President
Warren G. Harding
Republican

The 1920 United States presidential election in Washington took place on November 2, 1920, as part of the 1920 United States presidential election in which all 48 states participated. State voters chose seven electors to represent them in the Electoral College via a popular vote pitting Democratic nominee James M. Cox and his running mate, Assistant Secretary of the Navy Franklin Roosevelt, against Republican challenger U.S. Senator Warren G. Harding and his running mate, Governor Calvin Coolidge.

By the beginning of 1920 skyrocketing inflation and President Woodrow Wilson's focus upon his proposed League of Nations at the expense of domestic policy had helped make the incumbent president very unpopular – besides which Wilson also had major health problems that had left First Lady Edith effectively running the nation.

Political unrest observed in the Palmer Raids and the "Red Scare" further added to the unpopularity of the Democratic Party, since this global political turmoil produced considerable fear of alien revolutionaries invading the country. Demand in the West for exclusion of Asian immigrants became even stronger than it had been before. Another issue was the anti-Cox position taken by the Ku Klux Klan because Cox was viewed by the Klan as too lenient towards Catholicism, and Cox's inconsistent stance on newly passed Prohibition – he had been a "wet" but in August announced he would support Prohibition enforcement.

The West had been the chief presidential battleground ever since the "System of 1896" emerged following that election. For this reason, Cox chose to tour the entire nation and after touring the Pacific Northwest Cox went to California to defend his proposed League of Nations and to convince the region that large sums of money were being spent by Harding simply to put Republicans in the White House. Cox argued that the League could have stopped the Asian conflicts – like the Japanese seizure of Shandong – but his apparent defence of Chinese immigrants in the Bay Area was very unpopular and large numbers of hecklers attacked the Democrat. Moreover, the only attention Cox received in the Western press was severe criticism, and he completely ignored charges against misadministration by the Wilson Administration, and in liberal, heavily unionized Washington State where strikes had been particularly extreme since the war ended, Cox's failure to address labour issues proved also very costly.

== Results ==
General Election Results
Party	Pledged to	Elector	Votes
Republican Party	Warren G. Harding	Emma Smith De Voe	223,137
Republican Party	Warren G. Harding	J. P. Todd	222,805
Republican Party	Warren G. Harding	Peter McGregor	222,564
Republican Party	Warren G. Harding	Luther Weedin	222,224
Republican Party	Warren G. Harding	A. C. Rundle	222,202
Republican Party	Warren G. Harding	George J. Stewart	222,153
Republican Party	Warren G. Harding	H. L. Geary	222,079
Democratic Party	James M. Cox	George N. Adams	84,298
Democratic Party	James M. Cox	Charles D. McCarthy	83,975
Democratic Party	James M. Cox	Mary B. Harker	83,874
Democratic Party	James M. Cox	John Reid	83,813
Democratic Party	James M. Cox	J. W. Austin	83,734
Democratic Party	James M. Cox	George W. Roupe	83,604
Democratic Party	James M. Cox	Jim P. Goodwin	83,458
Farmer–Labor Party	Parley P. Christensen	Viola C. Crahan	77,246
Farmer–Labor Party	Parley P. Christensen	Elizabeth Sullivan	77,088
Farmer–Labor Party	Parley P. Christensen	Louis E. Bradley	77,068
Farmer–Labor Party	Parley P. Christensen	L. H. Richards	76,987
Farmer–Labor Party	Parley P. Christensen	Edith Downing	76,873
Farmer–Labor Party	Parley P. Christensen	C. E. Richards	76,834
Farmer–Labor Party	Parley P. Christensen	Dortha Ing	76,822
Socialist Party	Eugene V. Debs	Mary M. Brown	8,913
Socialist Party	Eugene V. Debs	B. H. Miller	8,749
Socialist Party	Eugene V. Debs	Herman Meyer	8,723
Socialist Party	Eugene V. Debs	Joseph O'Reilly	8,721
Socialist Party	Eugene V. Debs	Lalla Rogers	8,703
Socialist Party	Eugene V. Debs	Walter Price	8,680
Socialist Party	Eugene V. Debs	W. H. Maynick	8,597
Prohibition Party	Aaron S. Watkins	Lucy C. Cotrael	3,800
Prohibition Party	Aaron S. Watkins	Arthur S. Caton	3,790
Prohibition Party	Aaron S. Watkins	Mattie Reynolds	3,784
Prohibition Party	Aaron S. Watkins	Olin L. Fowler	3,754
Prohibition Party	Aaron S. Watkins	W. A. Davis	3,750
Prohibition Party	Aaron S. Watkins	W. E. Haycox	3,749
Prohibition Party	Aaron S. Watkins	Emmett D. Nichols	3,712
Socialist Labor Party	Wesley W. Cox	Andrew Rynning	1,321
Socialist Labor Party	Wesley W. Cox	James F. Stark	1,316
Socialist Labor Party	Wesley W. Cox	George B. Sargent	1,297
Socialist Labor Party	Wesley W. Cox	Frederick Kurtzman	1,284
Socialist Labor Party	Wesley W. Cox	Daniel L. Barnet	1,272
Socialist Labor Party	Wesley W. Cox	Joseph Tottenhoff	1,258
Socialist Labor Party	Wesley W. Cox	Abraham L. Bearcliff	1,247
Votes cast (Note: Based on totals for highest elector on each ticket)			398,715

=== Results by county ===
County	Warren G. Harding Republican		James M. Cox Democratic		Parley P. Christensen Farmer–Labor		Eugene V. Debs Socialist		Aaron S. Watkins Prohibition		William W. Cox Socialist Labor		Margin		Total votes cast (Note: Based on highest elector on each ticket)
County	#	%	#	%	#	%	#	%	#	%	#	%	#	%	Total votes cast
Adams	1,525	67.15%	515	22.68%	167	7.35%	42	1.85%	17	0.75%	5	0.22%	1,010	44.47%	2,271
Asotin	1,210	64.84%	497	26.63%	61	3.27%	49	2.63%	46	2.47%	3	0.16%	713	38.21%	1,866
Benton	2,001	52.01%	975	25.34%	764	19.86%	51	1.33%	50	1.30%	6	0.16%	1,026	26.67%	3,847
Chelan	3,885	58.55%	1,540	23.21%	957	14.42%	110	1.66%	132	1.99%	11	0.17%	2,345	35.34%	6,635
Clallam	1,775	53.76%	489	14.81%	966	29.25%	43	1.30%	20	0.61%	9	0.27%	809 (Note: In this county where Christensen ran second ahead of James Cox, margin given is Harding vote minus Christensen vote and percentage margin Harding percentage minus Christensen percentage.)	24.50%	3,302
Clarke	4,852	52.20%	2,941	31.64%	1,127	12.12%	234	2.52%	125	1.34%	16	0.17%	1,911	20.56%	9,295
Columbia	1,376	64.18%	662	30.88%	57	2.66%	36	1.68%	10	0.47%	3	0.14%	714	33.30%	2,144
Cowlitz	2,267	61.49%	801	21.72%	464	12.58%	115	3.12%	34	0.92%	6	0.16%	1,466	39.76%	3,687
Douglas	1,587	57.86%	918	33.47%	171	6.23%	45	1.64%	19	0.69%	3	0.11%	669	24.39%	2,743
Ferry	592	43.56%	505	37.16%	214	15.75%	41	3.02%	3	0.22%	4	0.29%	87	6.40%	1,359
Franklin	839	44.46%	571	30.26%	397	21.04%	62	3.29%	14	0.74%	4	0.21%	268	14.20%	1,887
Garfield	869	66.03%	370	28.12%	62	4.71%	7	0.53%	8	0.61%	0	0.00%	499	37.92%	1,316
Grant	1,378	58.24%	684	28.91%	216	9.13%	60	2.54%	28	1.18%	0	0.00%	694	29.33%	2,366
Grays Harbor	5,920	50.94%	3,378	29.07%	1,978	17.02%	240	2.07%	81	0.70%	25	0.22%	2,542	21.87%	11,622
Island	883	51.19%	285	16.52%	488	28.29%	52	3.01%	15	0.87%	2	0.12%	395	22.90%	1,725
Jefferson	1,128	61.57%	322	17.58%	321	17.52%	36	1.97%	22	1.20%	3	0.16%	806	44.00%	1,832
King	58,584	54.69%	17,369	16.21%	26,768	24.99%	3,081	2.88%	690	0.64%	632	0.59%	31,816	29.70%	107,124
Kitsap	4,989	49.41%	1,350	13.37%	3,326	32.94%	325	3.22%	85	0.84%	23	0.23%	1,663	16.47%	10,098
Kittitas	2,837	54.54%	1,119	21.51%	1,054	20.26%	134	2.58%	41	0.79%	17	0.33%	1,718	33.03%	5,202
Klickitat	1,649	59.38%	745	26.83%	298	10.73%	45	1.62%	39	1.40%	1	0.04%	904	32.55%	2,777
Lewis	6,160	54.59%	2,212	19.60%	2,520	22.33%	259	2.30%	117	1.04%	17	0.15%	3,640	32.26%	11,285
Lincoln	3,038	65.04%	1,395	29.87%	144	3.08%	55	1.18%	34	0.73%	5	0.11%	1,643	35.17%	4,671
Mason	997	56.04%	383	21.53%	351	19.73%	25	1.41%	19	1.07%	4	0.22%	614	34.51%	1,779
Okanogan	2,784	54.98%	1,260	24.88%	809	15.98%	128	2.53%	66	1.30%	17	0.34%	1,524	30.09%	5,064
Pacific	2,607	65.57%	874	21.98%	372	9.36%	87	2.19%	28	0.70%	8	0.20%	1,733	43.59%	3,976
Pend Oreille	1,079	54.30%	651	32.76%	167	8.40%	67	3.37%	12	0.60%	11	0.55%	428	21.54%	1,987
Pierce	22,048	51.89%	8,259	19.44%	10,836	25.50%	779	1.83%	436	1.03%	133	0.31%	11,212	26.39%	42,491
San Juan	833	66.64%	196	15.68%	172	13.76%	37	2.96%	10	0.80%	2	0.16%	637	50.96%	1,250
Skagit	5,320	51.62%	1,840	17.85%	2,756	26.74%	208	2.02%	159	1.54%	23	0.22%	2,564	24.88%	10,306
Skamania	409	52.71%	247	31.83%	87	11.21%	24	3.09%	7	0.90%	2	0.26%	162	20.88%	776
Snohomish	10,793	52.48%	3,056	14.86%	6,146	29.88%	356	1.73%	181	0.88%	35	0.17%	4,647	22.59%	20,567
Spokane	26,219	60.55%	13,412	30.97%	2,373	5.48%	777	1.79%	360	0.83%	160	0.37%	12,807	29.58%	43,301
Stevens	3,282	55.68%	1,452	24.64%	914	15.51%	175	2.97%	61	1.03%	10	0.17%	1,830	31.05%	5,894
Thurston	3,899	52.77%	1,367	18.50%	1,849	25.03%	114	1.54%	147	1.99%	12	0.16%	2,050	27.75%	7,388
Wahkiakum	494	57.64%	164	19.14%	75	8.75%	109	12.72%	3	0.35%	12	1.40%	330	38.51%	857
Walla Walla	5,957	67.60%	2,338	26.53%	349	3.96%	79	0.90%	74	0.84%	15	0.17%	3,619	41.07%	8,812
Whatcom	9,157	57.52%	2,288	14.37%	3,744	23.52%	481	3.02%	205	1.29%	45	0.28%	5,413	34.00%	15,920
Whitman	6,344	64.68%	2,806	28.61%	425	4.33%	119	1.21%	99	1.01%	16	0.16%	3,538	36.07%	9,809
Yakima	11,571	59.39%	4,062	20.85%	3,301	16.94%	226	1.16%	303	1.56%	21	0.11%	7,509	38.54%	19,484
Totals	223,137	55.96%	84,298	21.14%	77,246	19.47%	8,913	2.24%	3,800	0.95%	1,321	0.33%	138,839	34.82%	398,715

==== Counties that flipped from Democratic to Republican ====
- Adams
- Asotin
- Columbia
- Douglas
- Ferry
- Franklin
- Grant
- Island
- King
- Kitsap
- Kittitas
- Lincoln
- Mason
- Okanogan
- Pend Oreille
- Pierce
- San Juan
- Skagit
- Spokane
- Stevens
- Walla Walla
- Whitman

== Analysis ==
By October, it was clear that the Northwest – where Charles Evans Hughes had carried only Oregon in 1916 – was strongly in favor of the Republicans: in Washington Harding led a combined poll of male and female voters 680 to Cox's 256. A week later polls strongly suggested Cox would not register a majority in any antebellum free or postbellum state, and in Washington he was trailing four to one out of around 2,100 people polled. Although there were some gains by the Democratic ticket in later polls, with Cox approaching a 1-to-2 ratio to Harding's support at the end of October, a minimum forty thousand vote plurality was predicted by the Washington Post at the same time.

Ultimately Harding took Washington in a landslide beyond the late-October polls' prediction, defeating Cox by a 138,839 vote margin. Parley Christensen, the nominee of the recently created Farmer–Labor Party, performed very well in the state and nearly drove Cox into third place, with only 7,052 votes between the two.

Harding proved the third and last Republican, following on from Theodore Roosevelt in 1904 and William Howard Taft in 1908, to sweep every county in Washington State. This feat has been equaled only by Democrat Franklin Delano Roosevelt, who ironically was Cox's running mate in this election, in both 1932 and 1936. This would prove the last election until Richard Nixon in 1968 when the Republican Party carried Ferry County.

== See also ==
- United States presidential elections in Washington (state)
