= Curren Price =

American politician (born 1950)

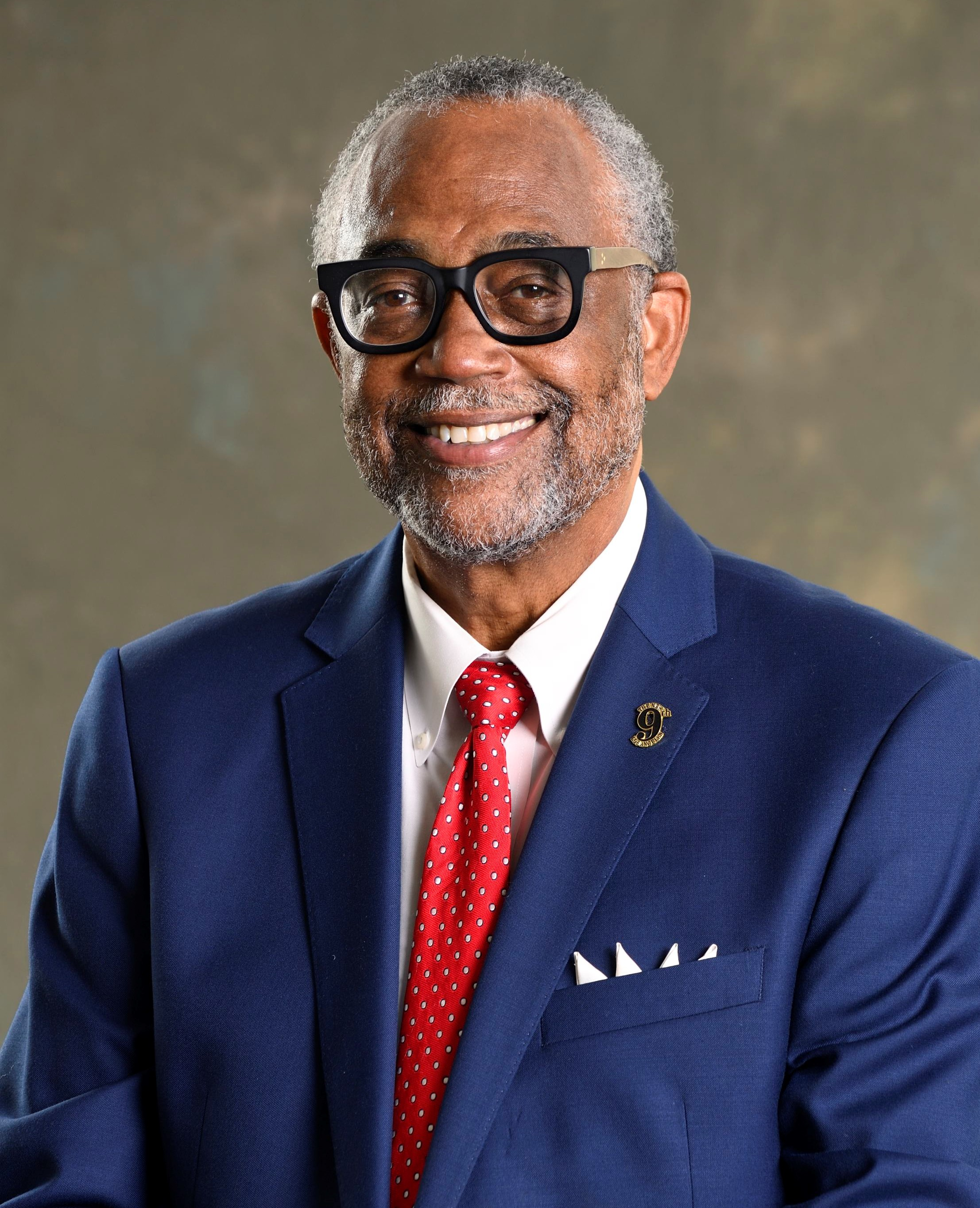
- Official portrait, 2021

President pro tempore of the Los Angeles City Council
- In office October 25, 2022 – June 13, 2023
- Preceded by: Mitch O'Farrell
- Succeeded by: Marqueece Harris-Dawson

Member of the Los Angeles City Council from the 9th district
- Incumbent
- Assumed office July 1, 2013
- Preceded by: Jan Perry

Member of the California State Senate from the 26th district
- In office June 8, 2009 – July 1, 2013
- Preceded by: Mark Ridley-Thomas
- Succeeded by: Holly Mitchell

Member of the California State Assembly from the 51st district
- In office December 4, 2006 – June 8, 2009
- Preceded by: Jerome Horton
- Succeeded by: Steve Bradford

Personal details
- Born: December 16, 1950 (age 75) Los Angeles, California, U.S.
- Party: Democratic
- Spouse(s): Lynn Green; Del Richardson Price
- Children: 2
- Education: Stanford University (BA); Santa Clara University (JD)

Curren De Mille Price Jr. (born December 16, 1950) is an American politician of the Democratic Party, currently serving as a Los Angeles city council member for District 9. Price was a California State Senator, representing the state's 26th Senate District which he won in the May 19, 2009 special election to fill the seat vacated by Mark Ridley-Thomas. He previously served as a member of the California State Assembly, representing the state's 51st Assembly District. He was first elected to that position in 2006, and was re-elected in 2008. Price resigned as state senator on July 1, 2013, to be sworn in as Los Angeles city councilman.

Price's tenure as District 9 Councilman has been marked by accusations of pay to play and FBI investigations. On June 13, 2023, Price was charged with ten criminal counts relating to corruption; including five counts of embezzlement of government funds, three counts of perjury, and two counts of conflict of interest.

== Career ==
From 1993 to 1997, Price was a member of the Inglewood City Council, representing the city's District 1. In 1997, he was defeated in a bid to become the mayor of Inglewood. In 2001, he reclaimed his former city council seat and held it until his election to the state assembly in 2006. As a council member, he was the chair of the City Council Community Economic Development Committee.

In addition to his council responsibilities, Price served on the Los Angeles County Commission on Insurance and the Los Angeles County Metropolitan Transportation Authority's South Bay Governance Council. For several years, he also served as a consultant with the Small Business Administration-sponsored Small Business Development Center.

Price was first elected to the California State Assembly in 2006 to represent the 51st District, and was re-elected to a second term in 2008.

== Controversies ==
=== Allegations of bigamy ===
In 2017, Curren Price was investigated due to allegations that he was willingly engaging in illegal bigamy which as an offense be punishable as either a misdeamenor or felony in California. Questions of Price's marriages first arose when news outlets reported that while he is currently married to Del Richardson, his divorce from a previous marriage to Lynn Suzette Green had never been finalized. In 2012, Curren Price claimed in court that he was unable to locate Green, and thus had difficulty in going through with the divorce proceedings. Price and his divorce attorney Albert Robles claimed in a document that they could not locate Lynn Price for the purpose of serving her with divorce papers and instead allow them to serve notice by buying a public notice ad in a local newspaper. Curren Price and Robles claimed that Lynn Price's most recent address was a property that was subsequently reported to belong to his second wife, Del Richardson-Price. News of Del Richardson-Price's ownership of his first wife's residence raised allegations that Curren Price was attempting to divorce his wife without her knowledge.

=== Inquiry into fund misappropriation ===
In 2020, it was reported that the Los Angeles District Attorney was reviewing a 2003 ordinance that would provide lifetime medical benefits for retired Inglewood elected officials. In 2003, as a member of the Inglewood City Council, Curren Price voted in favor of an ordinance. The ordinance came under scrutiny as Inglewood Treasurer Wanda Brown publicly accused the City Council and City Manager Artie Fields of misappropriating $195,983 for medical benefits for past elected officials. While Price himself was not the recipient of any medical benefits under the ordinance, his wife Del Richardson-Price filed a claim in January 2018 for medical claims to be paid on her behalf. The claim was denied.

=== Allegations of conflict of interest ===
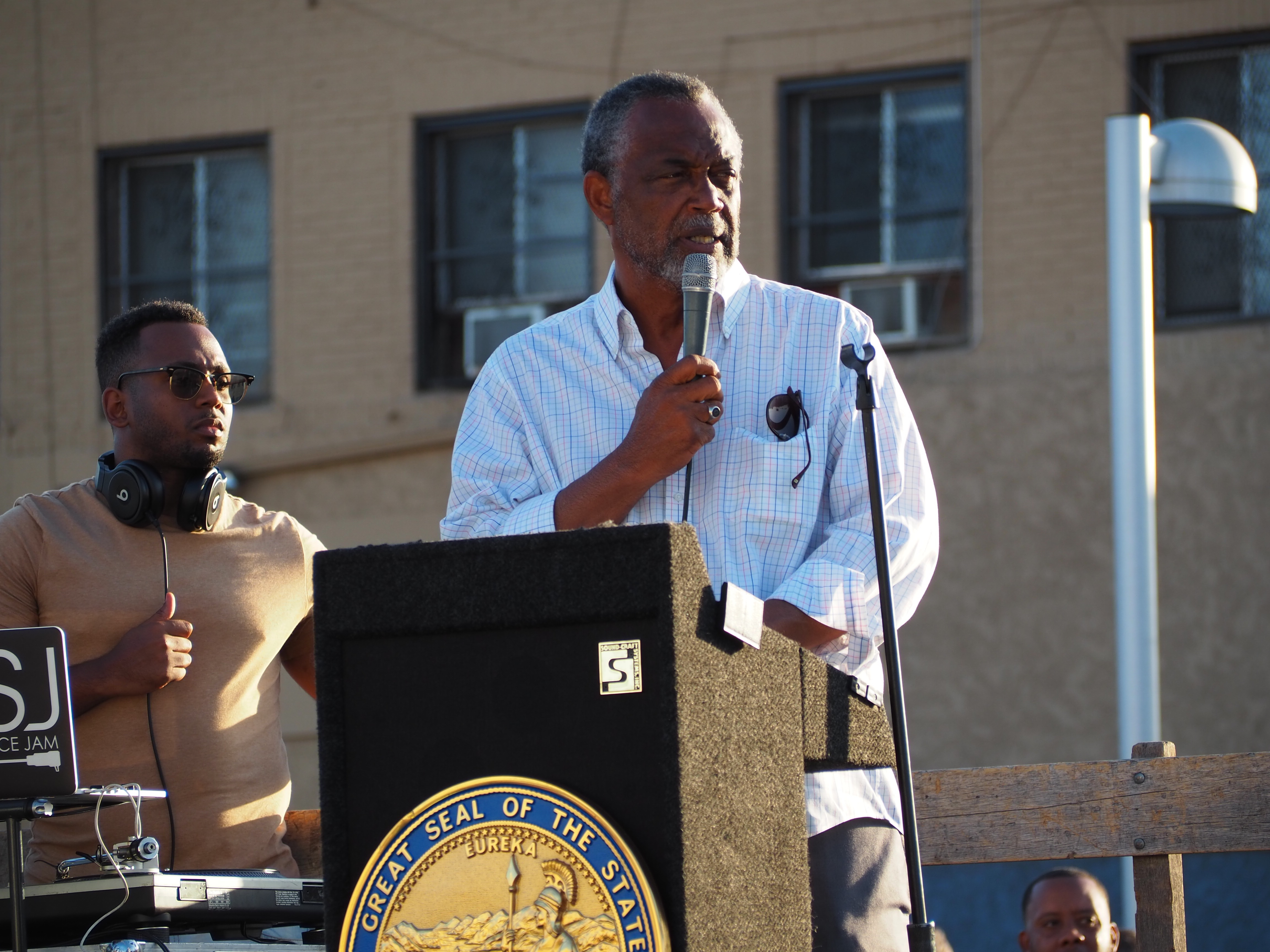
Price in 2018 speaking against gun violence.

In 2016, Curren Price supported plans for Reef, a $1.2-billion skyscraper complex, that would be built in his South Los Angeles district. Critics argued the development would fuel gentrification, could provide a hazard to drivers, and the proposed digital billboards could shine into the homes of the lower income South Los Angeles community. Despite opposition from city planning commissioners, tenants rights activists, and local residents, Los Angeles City Council approved plans for Reef. Subsequently, a political action committee co-sponsored by the lobbying firm representing Reef paid for campaign mailers, outdoor signs, and robocalls to voters from former Mayor Antonio Villaraigosa. Altogether, companies tied to the Reef developer donated $75,000 to Curren Price's re-election campaign. Curren Price denied to comment on allegations that he accepted dark money in return for pushing the project through.

In 2017, it was reported that Price married Del Richardson before his divorce to his previous wife was finalized. Price failed to disclose his first wife's assets as well as his new wife's assets in his reports. "Since some of Price's properties are located in the City of Los Angeles, he was supposed to disclose ownership in the event they were impacted by City Council votes on issues such as sidewalk repair, street lighting, street furniture, advertising and redistricting, among others. Price also failed to disclose the businesses owned by second wife Del Richardson-Price including DRA Associates, Just Work Inc. and Cuba Travel Service. If they, or their affiliates, applied for contracts from the LA City Council, Price would have had to recuse himself from those discussions and votes. Councilmember Price also neglected in 2012 to list any of Del Richardson-Price's clients who paid her more than $10,000 each. A year later, in 2013, at least 20 businesses and government agencies fit that description Price either failed to detail his wife's client-based income in 2012, or she went from zero-to-20 clients as soon as he was elected to LA City Council."

In 2019, Price was scrutinized over several instances in which he voted on matters benefiting wife's consulting company Del Richardson & Associates. Price voted on decisions involving at least 10 companies in the same years they were listed as providing at least $10,000 in income to Del Richardson & Associates, according to his annual financial disclosures and council records.

=== FBI investigation ===
In 2019, the Los Angeles Times reported that Price was amongst a group of Los Angeles Councilmembers being investigated in a corruption probe. The probe was primarily concerned with Chinese investors bankrolling projects in the Los Angeles area. The FBI warrant was in search of possible bribery, extortion, money laundering and other crimes as part of a corruption investigation at City Hall. Price heads a council committee focused on economic development, which reviews taxpayer subsidies offered by the city to hotel developers in and around downtown. In November 2020, when indictments were unsealed against Jose Huizar, no evidence of corruption was presented against Price but five new names were added to the corruption scandal, including former Deputy Mayor Raymond Chan, Wei Huang of San Marino, Shen Zhen New World 1, LLC a company owned and controlled by Huang, Dae (David) Lee of Bel Air and 940 Hill, LLC which is owned by Lee.

=== Comments regarding victims of LAPD fireworks explosion ===
On June 30, 2021, an LAPD bomb disposal squad detonated confiscated illegal fireworks in a residential neighborhood in Curren Price's 9th District, injuring 17 people, causing extensive damage to 22 residences, 13 businesses, and 37 vehicles. As a result of the explosion, more than 80 residents in the neighborhood were displaced and relocated to hotels that would serve as temporary housing while their homes would be repaired. In February 2023, nineteen months after the explosion, it was reported many residents were still displaced and living in the hotels due to delays caused by what they claimed to be negligence from Los Angeles city officials and unresponsive insurance companies. In an interview with The Los Angeles Times, Price was among city officials hoping to evict victims from the hotels and accused victims of "gaming the system" and commented, "They've had it good living in the hotel rent free for several months. They want that to last as long as it can." Following widespread criticism, Price later issued an apology and vowed to secure additional funding for victims to stay at the hotel beyond the initial deadline. In a statement, Price was quoted as saying that "the city of L.A. will not abandon them, and rest assured they will not be subjected to any type of eviction that can cause further pain and trauma."

=== Corruption charges ===
In June 2023, Price was charged with five counts of embezzlement of government funds, three counts of perjury and two counts of conflict of interest. The district attorney's office alleges that Price took part in pay-for-play schemes that benefited his wife's company, which Price failed to list on government financial disclosure forms.

In March 2024, The Los Angeles City Ethics Commission filed a case accusing Price of 21 violations of Los Angeles city ethics laws. In the criminal case, Price is accused of voting to support projects for developers that had done business with a consulting company founded by his wife, Del Richardson Price, who specialized in tenant relocation services. He currently faces five counts of embezzlement, two counts of conflict of interest and three counts of perjury."

On August 12, 2025, "District Attorney Nathan Hochman announced in a press release that the Los Angeles County District Attorney’s Office has filed corruption charges against City Councilmember Curren Price. Price is accused of approving multi-million dollar government contracts to local agencies, which paid his wife over $800,000 in turn. Said agencies include the Los Angeles County Metropolitan Transportation Authority (L.A. Metro) and the Housing Authority of the City of Los Angeles (HACLA)."

Political offices
Preceded by Mitch O'Farrell	President pro tempore of the Los Angeles City Council; 2022–2023	Succeeded by Marqueece Harris-Dawson
