= George W. C. Baker =

American politician (1872-1953)

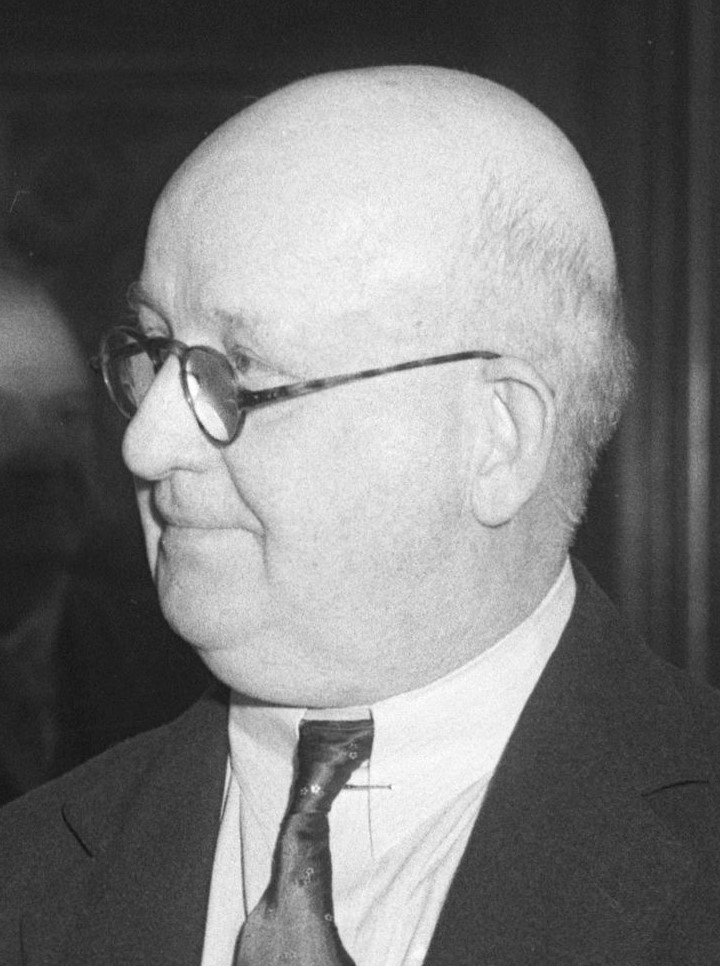
- Baker in 1933

Member of the Los Angeles City Council from the 9th District
- In office July 1, 1937 – August 7, 1937
- Preceded by: Parley P. Christensen
- Succeeded by: Winfred J. Sanborn

Personal details
- Born: September 28, 1872 San Francisco, California
- Died: April 13, 1953 (aged 80) San Gabriel, California
- Party: Republican
- Spouses: Carrie L. Moulton (m. 1872; div. 1918) Lura Cassingham (m. 1921)
- Children: 3

George Washington Conrad Baker (September 28, 1872 – April 13, 1953) was a member of the Los Angeles, California, City Council from 1931 to 1935.

== Biography ==
Baker was born on September 28, 1872, in San Francisco, California, the son of Conrad Baker of Philadelphia and Angelia Ingargiola of New Orleans. He had three siblings, Dollie E., Andrew Jr., and Cora. Baker attended Lincoln Grammar and Hayes Valley Grammar schools in San Francisco and graduated from Commercial High School in that city; he then did four years of legal study with the firm of Frank and Eisner, also in San Francisco. He was president of the Roadamite Paving Company and spent some years in engineering and construction. He lived briefly in San Jose and "was instrumental in developing the oil industry in Central California counties."

Baker was married in 1872 in Philadelphia to Carrie L. Moulton; they divorced in 1918. Baker next married Lura Cassingham in 1921 in San Jose, California. Baker had three sons, Conrad, Addison, and Edwin L., and a daughter, Mrs. William N. Luther.

He moved to Los Angeles in 1923 and, with others, did civic work in developing East Los Angeles with parks, roads, drainage systems and playgrounds. Baker was a member of the City Club, Native Sons of the Golden West, Kiwanis, and Masons. He was a Protestant and termed himself a Progressive Republican. He was connected with the Arcadia-Baker-Bandini Estates.

Baker died at the age of 83 on April 13, 1953, in his home, 428 Rosemont Boulevard, San Gabriel. He was buried in Rosehill Cemetery.

== City Council ==
=== Elections ===
Baker was elected to the 9th District seat in 1931 over the incumbent, Winfred J. Sanborn. In that era, the boundaries were Alhambra Avenue on the north, the Vernon city line on the south, Hill Street on the west, and Indiana Street on the east, with the Los Angeles River bisecting the district. He was reelected in 1933 but lost the 1935 election to Parley Parker Christensen. Baker ran again in 1939 but failed to be nominated.

=== Controversies ===
1931 Baker was at the forefront of an attempt to rid the City Hall of what was called "snoopers" — employees of both the city prosecutor's and the mayor's offices, who were authorized to make investigations on those officials' behalf. The functions of the employees overlapped those of the police department, it was said. His particular targets were the Rev. Martin Luther Thomas, chief investigator for the prosecutor, and W.J. Mosher, the mayor's confidential secretary, whom he called "pussy-footers" valueless to the city. Thomas replied: "Mr. Baker is either wilfully ignorant of the activities and duties of the investigating department of the City Prosecutor's office, or else has deliberately allowed himself to be made the mouthpiece of designing politicians and underworld groups." As part of the squabble, Baker also "hurled defiance" at the Rev. Robert P. Shuler, whom he called "that loud-mouthed radio preacher down on Flower Street.

1931 He was one of the eight council members who in July 1931 voted against appealing a judge's decision ordering an end to racial restrictions in city-operated swimming pools, thus ending the practice. Six council members wanted to continue the legal fight. The pools had previously been restricted by race to certain days or hours.

1932 Baker introduced a resolution asking for an ordinance to require inspection and certification of raw-milk dairies, a move opposed by Council Member Evan Lewis, who asserted it was a scheme to raise the price of milk.

1934 He urged that the City of Los Angeles withdraw from Los Angeles County and form a county of its own.

Preceded by Winfred J. Sanborn	Los Angeles City Council; 9th District; 1931–37	Succeeded by Parley Parker Christensen
