= Los Angeles's 9th City Council district =

American legislative district

Councilmember
Curren Price; D–South Park
since July 1, 2013
- Demographics: 2.1% White; 15.7% Black; 79.9% Hispanic; 13.3% Asian; 0.2% Other
- Population (2020): 264,172
- Registered voters (2017): 91,121
- Website: cd9.lacity.gov

Los Angeles's 9th City Council district is one of the fifteen districts in the Los Angeles City Council. It is currently represented by Democrat Curren Price since 2013 after winning an election to succeed Jan Perry, who ran for Mayor of Los Angeles that year.

The district was created in 1925 after a new city charter was passed, which replaced the former "at large" voting system for a nine-member council with a district system with a 15-member council. The district has occupied the same general area since it was formed in 1925. With the city's changes in population, its western boundary has moved farther west to include much of Downtown.

== Geography ==
The 9th formerly covered the entire core of Downtown Los Angeles, before redistricting divided it between the 9th and the 14th District. The district's boundary continues several miles to the south and ends just north of Watts. It includes Vermont Square, Central-Alameda, and Green Meadows, stretching from Downtown and with University of Southern California, Exposition Park, L.A. Live and the Los Angeles Convention Center being notable places within the district.

The district is completely within California's 37th congressional district and California's 28th State Senate district with a part in California's 35th State Senate district, and is part of California's 57th State Assembly district and California's 55th State Assembly district.

=== Historical boundaries ===
The district was preceded by the ninth ward, established in 1889 with the passing of the 1888 charter. The ward was situated in Downtown Los Angeles, including Bunker Hill, Los Angeles and Financial District. It elected one member through a plurality vote before the ward became obsolete when the at-large district was re-established again in 1909. The ward had one of the longest serving members before the passing of the 1925 charter, being Republican Everett L. Blanchard who served for fifteen years.

In 1925, the district was created and was bounded on the north by Alhambra Avenue, south by the Vernon city line, east by Indiana Street, and west by Alameda Avenue with the Los Angeles River bisecting it. In 1928, the western boundary was moved west to Hill Street. In 1933, it was bounded on the north by Alhambra Avenue, south by 25th Street, Indiana Street; west, Figueroa Street.

In 1964, it encompassed all of the downtown area. In 1990, it comprised Downtown, Little Tokyo, and Chinatown, and about 70 blocks south of Downtown. A year later, it spanned from Chinatown on the north to 84th Street on the south.

== List of members representing the district ==
=== 1889–1909 ===
Councilmember	Party	Years	Electoral history
Single-member ward established February 25, 1989
Robert E. Wirsching (Downtown)	Republican	February 25, 1889 – December 5, 1890	Elected in 1889. Not a candidate for the next election.
Samuel Rees (Boyle Heights)	Republican	December 5, 1890 – December 12, 1892	Elected in 1890. Retired.
George W. Campbell (Boyle Heights)	Republican	December 12, 1892 – December 14, 1894	Elected in 1892. Retired.
Everett L. Blanchard (Boyle Heights)	Republican	December 12, 1894 – December 5, 1902	Elected in 1894. Re-elected in 1896. Re-elected in 1898. Re-elected in 1900. Lost re-election.
Frank U. Nofziger (Boyle Heights)	Republican	December 5, 1902 – December 8, 1904	Elected in 1902. Lost re-election.
Everett L. Blanchard (Boyle Heights)	Republican	December 8, 1904 – December 10, 1909	Elected in 1904. Re-elected in 1906. Retired.
Single-member ward eliminated December 10, 1909

=== 1925–present ===
Councilmember	Party	Dates	Electoral history
District established July 1, 1925
Winfred J. Sanborn (Boyle Heights)	Republican	July 1, 1925 – June 30, 1931	Redistricted from the at-large district and re-elected in 1925. Re-elected in 1927. Re-elected in 1929. Lost re-election.
George W. C. Baker (Boyle Heights)	Republican	July 1, 1931 – June 30, 1935	Elected in 1931. Re-elected in 1933. Lost re-election.
Parley P. Christensen (Bunker Hill)	Independent	July 1, 1935 – June 30, 1937	Elected in 1935. Lost re-election.
Howard E. Dorsey (Boyle Heights)	Democratic	July 1, 1937 – August 7, 1937	Elected in 1937. Died.
Vacant		August 7, 1937 – September 20, 1937	
Winfred J. Sanborn (Boyle Heights)	Republican	September 20, 1937 – June 30, 1939	Appointed to finish Dorsey's term. Lost election.
Parley P. Christensen (Bunker Hill)	Democratic	July 1, 1939 – June 30, 1949	Elected in 1939. Re-elected in 1943. Re-elected in 1947. Lost re-election.
Edward R. Roybal (Boyle Heights)	Democratic	July 1, 1949 – December 31, 1962	Elected in 1949. Re-elected in 1951. Re-elected in 1953. Re-elected in 1957. Re-elected in 1961. Resigned when elected to the U.S. House of Representatives.
Vacant		December 31, 1962 – January 28, 1963	
Gilbert W. Lindsay (Vermont Square)	Democratic	January 28, 1963 – December 28, 1990	Appointed to finish Roybal's term. Elected in 1963. Re-elected in 1965. Re-elected in 1969. Re-elected in 1973. Re-elected in 1977. Re-elected in 1981. Re-elected in 1985. Re-elected in 1965. Re-elected in 1989. Died.
Vacant		December 28, 1990 – July 1, 1991	
Rita Walters (Vermont Square)	Democratic	July 1, 1991 – June 30, 2001	Elected to finish Lindsay's term. Elected in 1993. Re-elected in 1997. Retired.
Jan Perry (Miracle Mile)	Democratic	July 1, 2001 – June 30, 2013	Elected in 2001. Re-elected in 2005. Retired to run for Mayor.
Curren Price (South Park)	Democratic	July 1, 2013 – present	Elected in 2013. Re-elected in 2017. Re-elected in 2022.
