= Eastside Los Angeles =

Urban area in California, United States

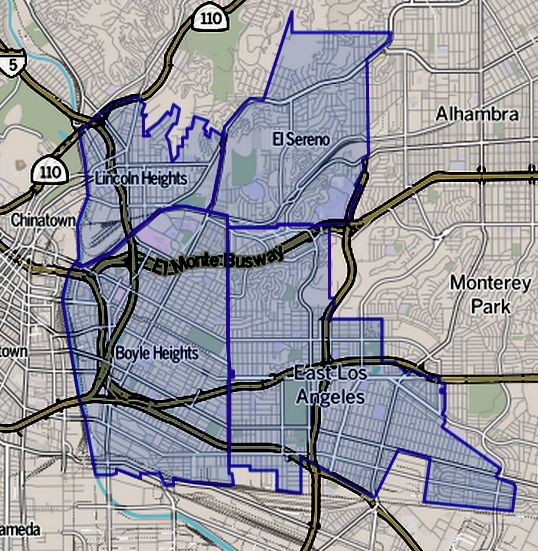
Eastside Los Angeles Los Angeles Times

The Eastside is an urban region in Los Angeles County, California. It includes the Los Angeles City neighborhoods east of the Los Angeles River—that is, Boyle Heights, El Sereno, and Lincoln Heights—as well as unincorporated East Los Angeles.

== History ==
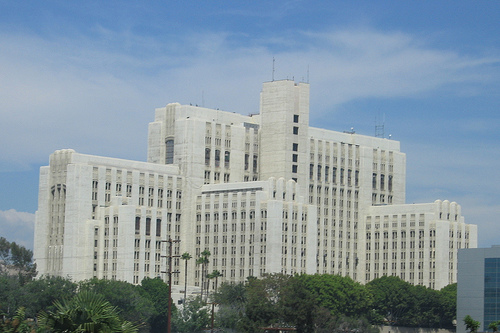
Los Angeles County+USC Medical Center, 2007

East Los Angeles was founded in 1870 by John Strother Griffin (1816–1898), who was called "the father of East Los Angeles". In late 1874 the two men offered an additional thirty-five acres, divided into 65x165-foot lots, for $150 each. They planned the laying out of streets of the present community of East Los Angeles and gifted East Side Park (the present Lincoln Park) to the city of Los Angeles.

The Mapping L.A. project of the Los Angeles Times defines the Eastside as comprising Boyle Heights, El Sereno, Lincoln Heights, and East Los Angeles. However, the boundaries are a matter of perennial discussion and debate among the residents of Los Angeles.

The Mapping L.A. definition corresponds to the traditional boundaries, but, beginning in the early 21st century, residents of some of the rapidly gentrifying neighborhoods west of Downtown Los Angeles but on the eastern side of Central Los Angeles, such as Echo Park and Silver Lake, began to refer to their neighborhoods as part of the Eastside. This debate generated some friction, which, according to Ali Modarres, an expert on the geography of Los Angeles from the University of Washington Tacoma, is to be expected because neighborhood names are "full of meaning, nuances, history, cultural and political relationships". Eric Garcetti, former mayor of Los Angeles and a fourth generation resident, is a traditionalist, stating that "true east is east of downtown".

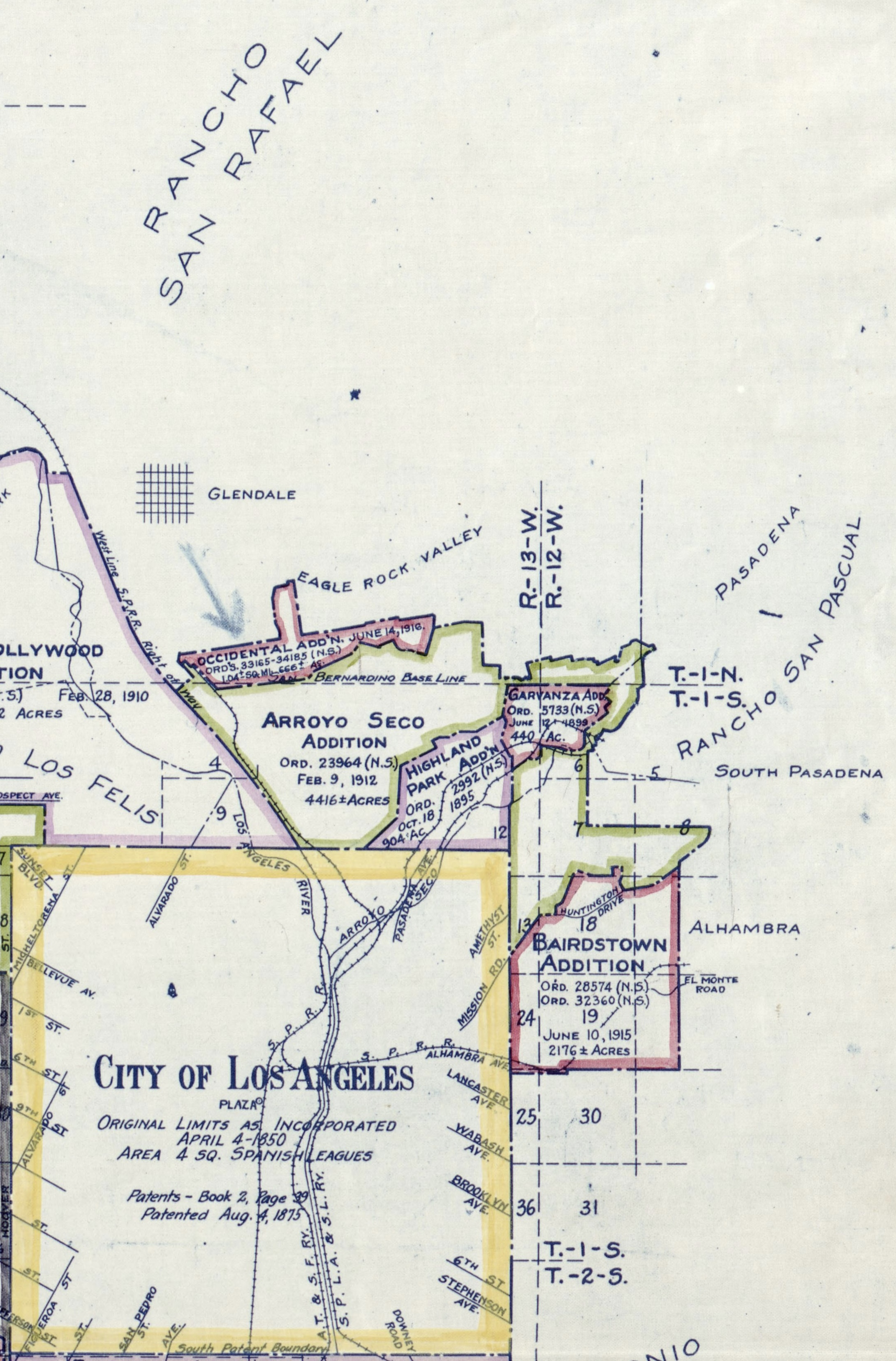
Map of annexations to Los Angeles: Occidental Addition, Arroyo Seco Addition, Garvanza Addition, Highland Park Addition, and Bairdstown Addition; locations of Rancho San Rafael and Rancho San Pascual

The trend led the Silver Lake Neighborhood Council to declare officially in February 2014 that Silver Lake is not part of the Eastside.

The Sixth Street Viaduct, also known as the Sixth Street Bridge, was demolished. Prior to the demolition, Los Angeles mayor Eric Garcetti recorded the rap song "101SlowJam", backed by musicians from Roosevelt High School, and issued it via a video on his own YouTube channel. The public service announcement video advertised the closure of parts of the 101 Freeway to accommodate the demolition of the viaduct.

== Communities ==
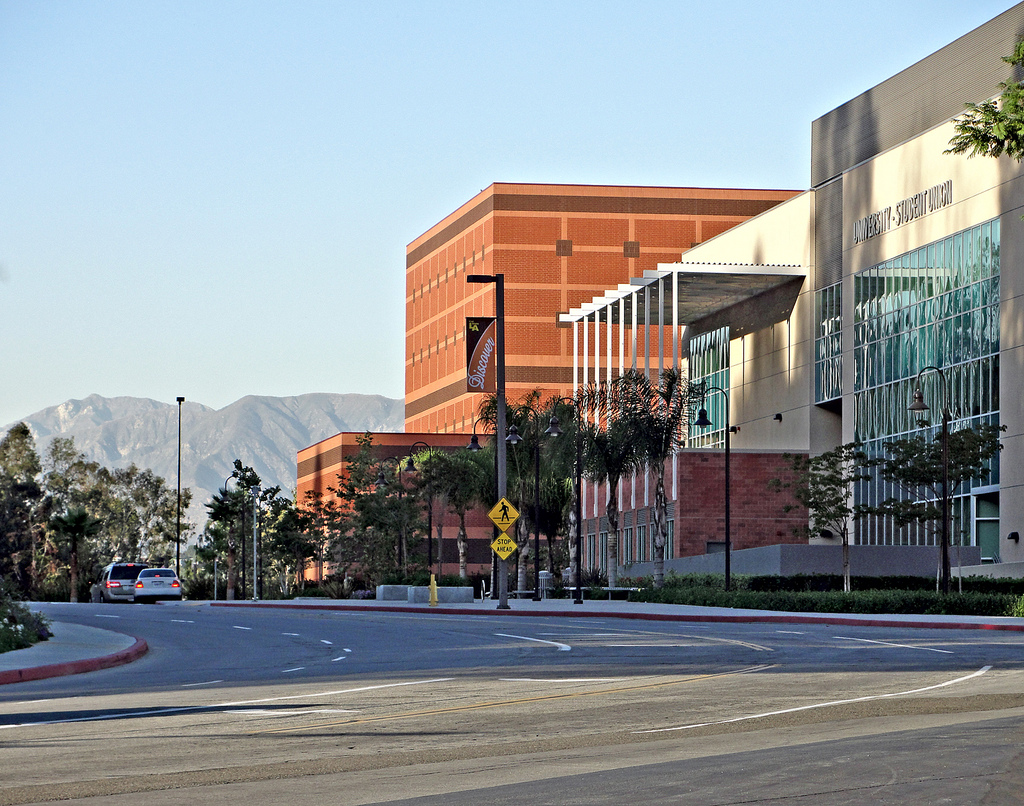
California State University, Los Angeles, Student Union and Luckman Auditorium, 2010

=== City of Los Angeles ===
The official East Area Planning Commission area of the City of Los Angeles is divided into the following communities:

- Boyle Heights
- Lincoln Heights
- El Sereno
- Northeast Los Angeles
  - Atwater Village
  - Cypress Park
  - Eagle Rock
  - Garvanza
  - Glassell Park
  - Hermon
  - Highland Park
  - Montecito Heights
  - Mount Washington
  - Rose Hills

=== Mapping L.A. ===
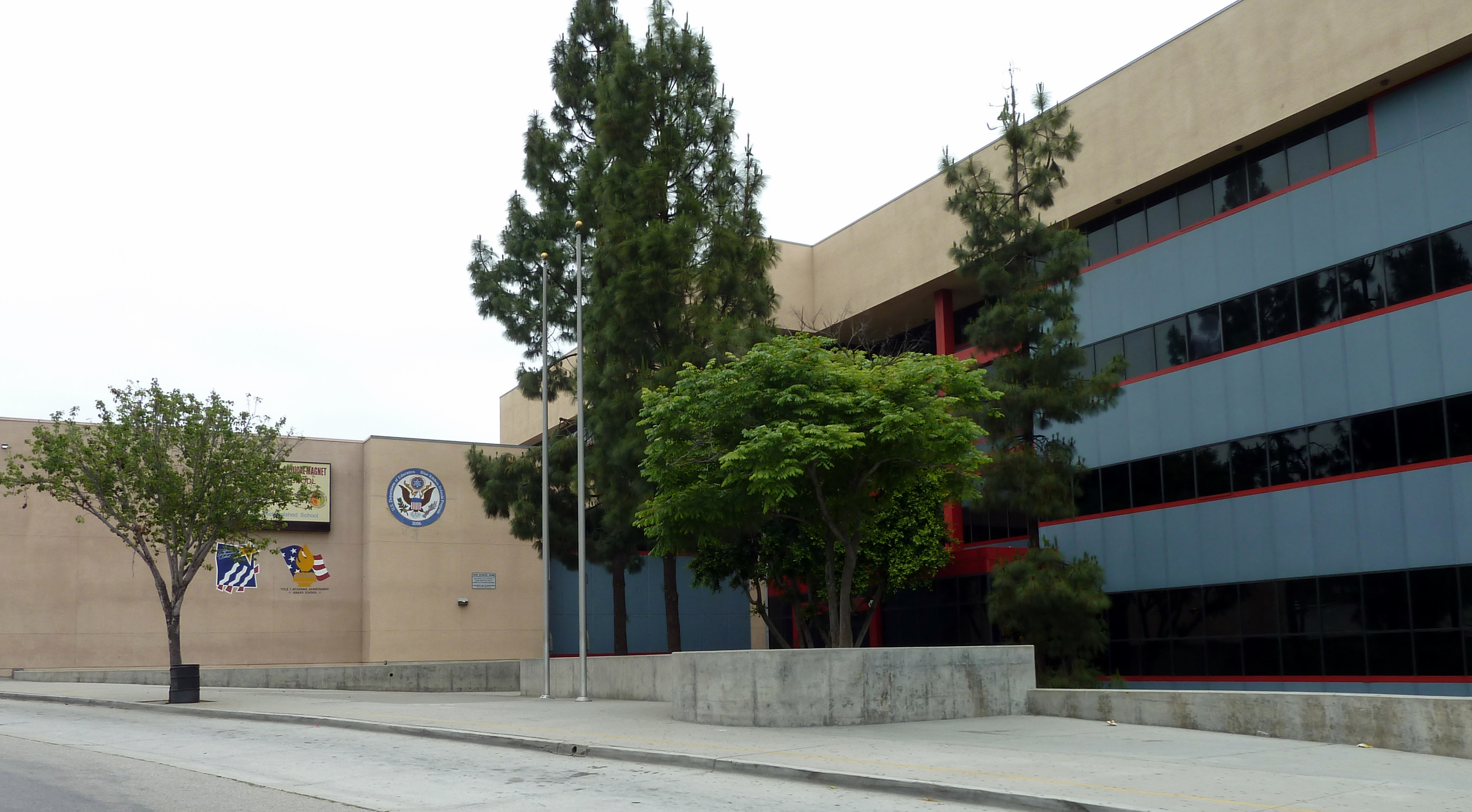
Francisco Bravo Medical Magnet High School

The Mapping L.A. project by the Los Angeles Times lists the following City of Los Angeles neighborhoods in its definition of the Eastside:

- Boyle Heights
- El Sereno
- Lincoln Heights

== Education ==
High Schools
Francisco Bravo Medical Magnet High School
Los Angeles County High School for the Arts
Marc and Eva Stern Math and Science School
Oscar De La Hoya Animo Charter High School
James A. Garfield High School
Theodore Roosevelt High School
Abraham Lincoln High School
Woodrow Wilson High School
Felicitas and Gonzalo Mendez High School
Esteban Torres High School

== Population and housing ==
The following data applies to the boundaries of the Eastside established by Mapping L.A.:

In 2000, 286,222 people lived in the 20.66 square miles of the Eastside region, amounting to 13,852 people per square mile. The neighborhood was "not especially diverse" ethnically, with a high percentage of Latinos. The ethnic breakdown was Latino, 91.2%; Asian, 5.2%, white, 2.3%; black, 0.7% and other, 0.6%. Just 5.1% of residents aged 25 and older had a four-year college degree. More than two-thirds (66.8%) of the inhabitants lived in shared housing, and 33.2% were homeowners.

== Notable places ==
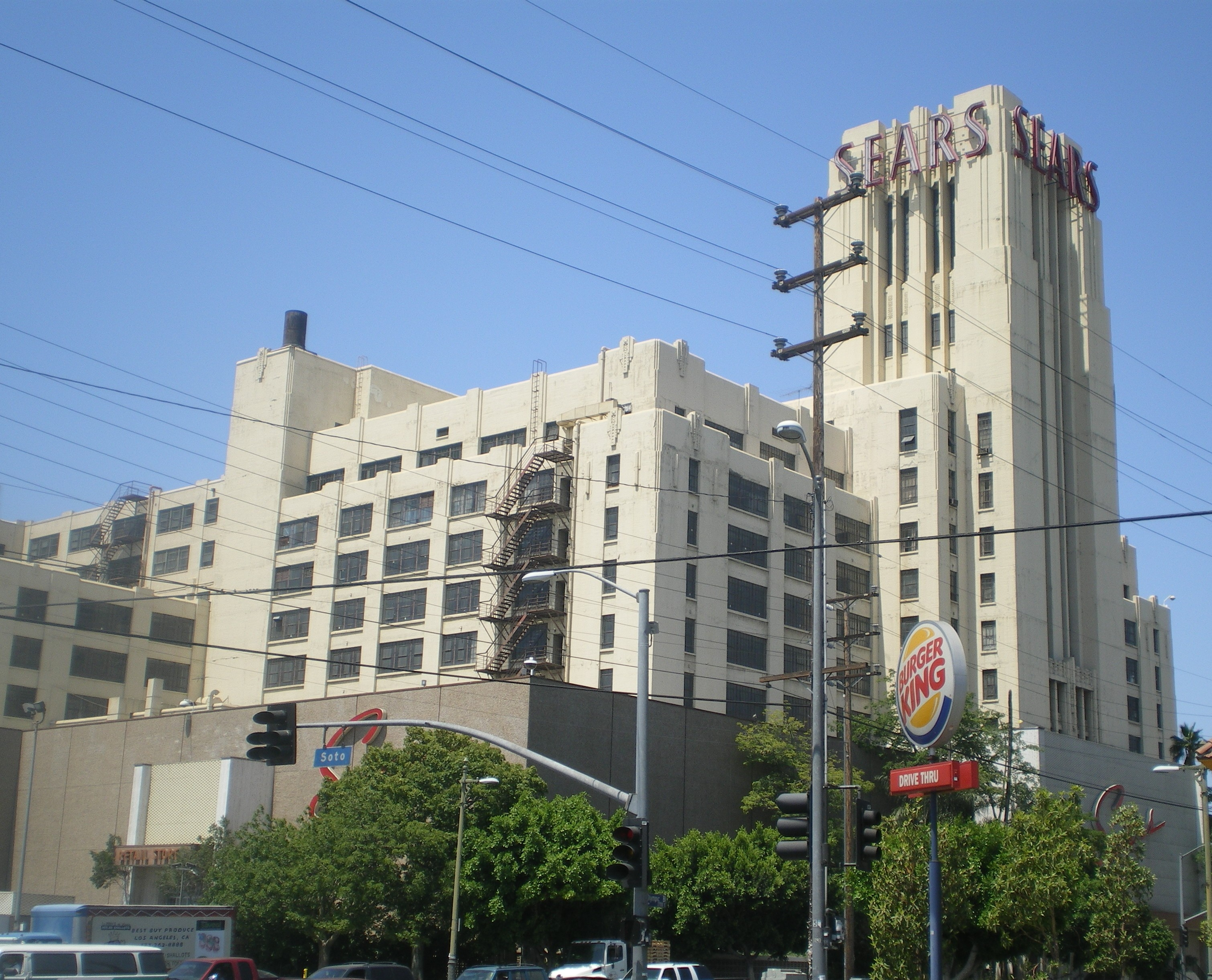
Sears, Roebuck & Company Mail Order Building (Los Angeles, California)

- Latino Walk of Fame - East Los Angeles
- Mariachi Plaza - Boyle Heights
- El Mercado de Los Angeles - Boyle Heights
- Calvary Cemetery (Roman Catholic) - East Los Angeles
- Home of Peace Cemetery (Jewish) - East Los Angeles
- Evergreen Cemetery - Boyle Heights
- Estrada Courts Murals - Boyle Heights
- El Pino (The Pine Tree) - East Los Angeles

== Notable people ==
- will.i.am (William James Adams, Jr.), musician, producer, philanthropist
- Herb Alpert, trumpeter, producer
- Narciso Botello (about 1813–1889) Mexican Army officer, California State Assembly member
- Anthony Quinn, actor
- Howard E. Dorsey, engineer, politician
- Jaime Escalante, educator
- Kid Frost, musician
- John Strother Griffin (1816–1898), surgeon, founder of East Los Angeles, member of Los Angeles Common Council
- Oscar De La Hoya, boxer
- Edward James Olmos, actor
- Dan Peña, financial analyst on Wall Street
- Luis J. Rodriguez, writer and activist
- Andy Russell, international recording artist
- Hope Sandoval, singer-songwriter

== Gallery ==
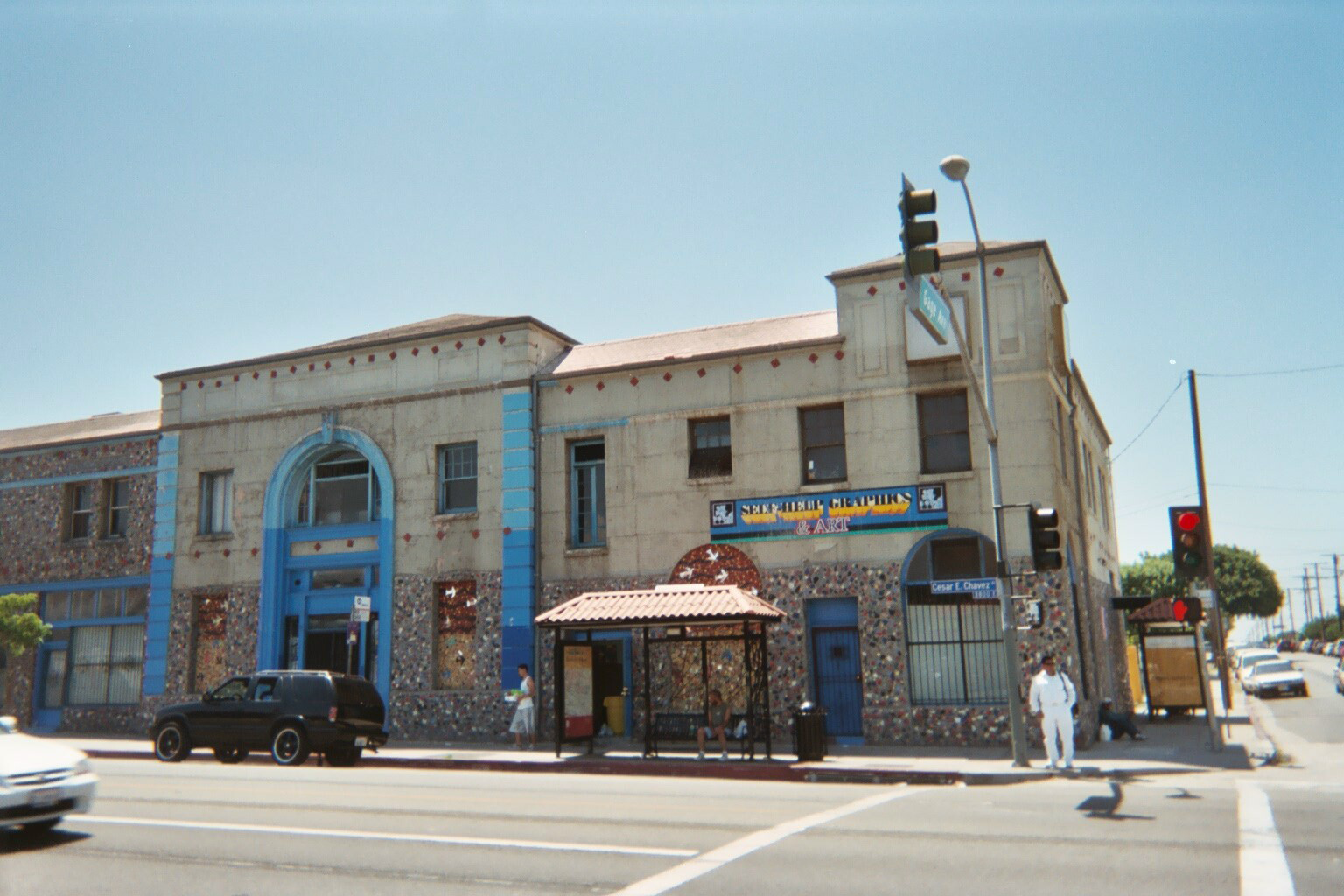
The Self-Help Graphics & Art building

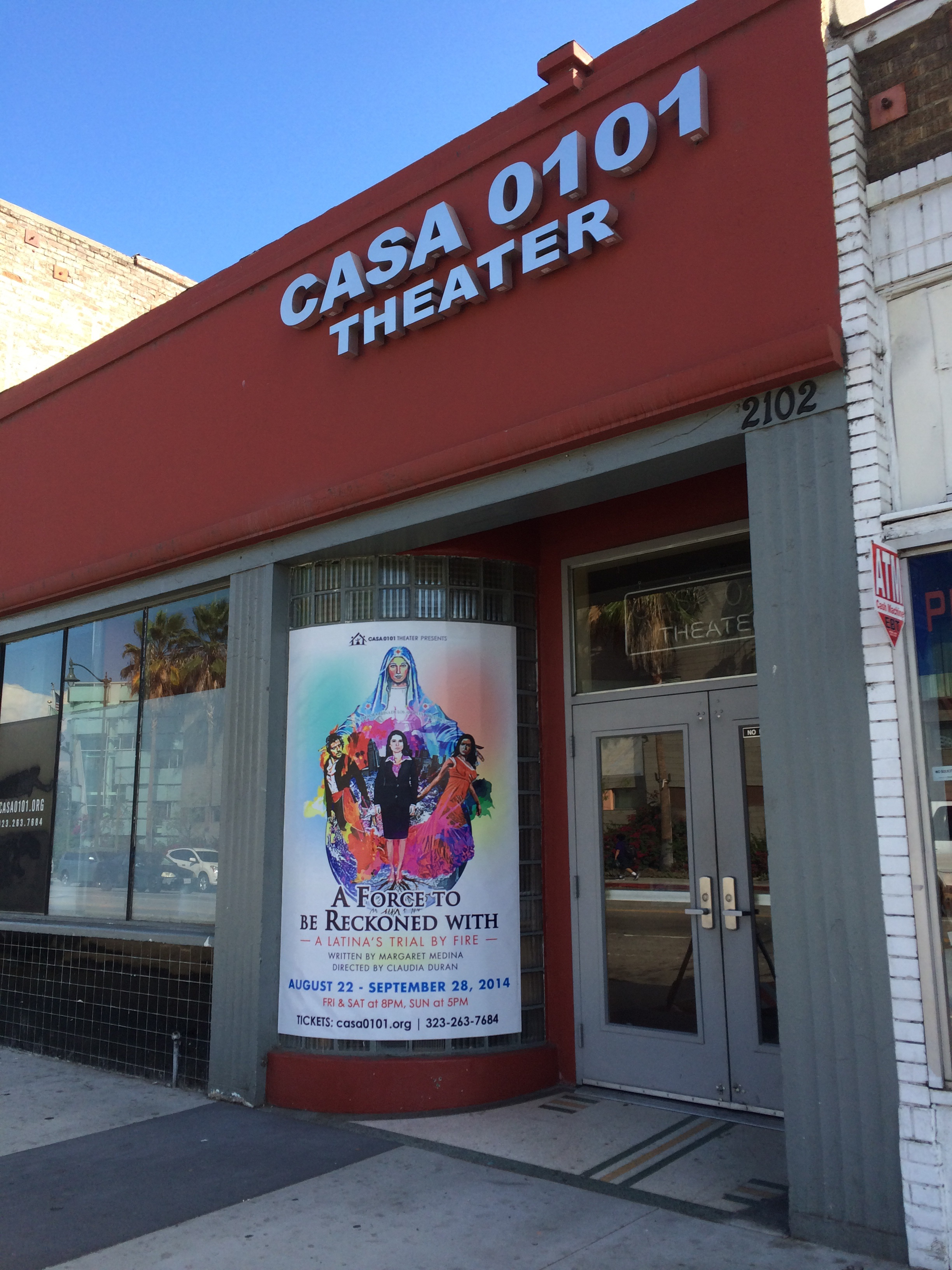
CASA 0101 Theater in Boyle Heights

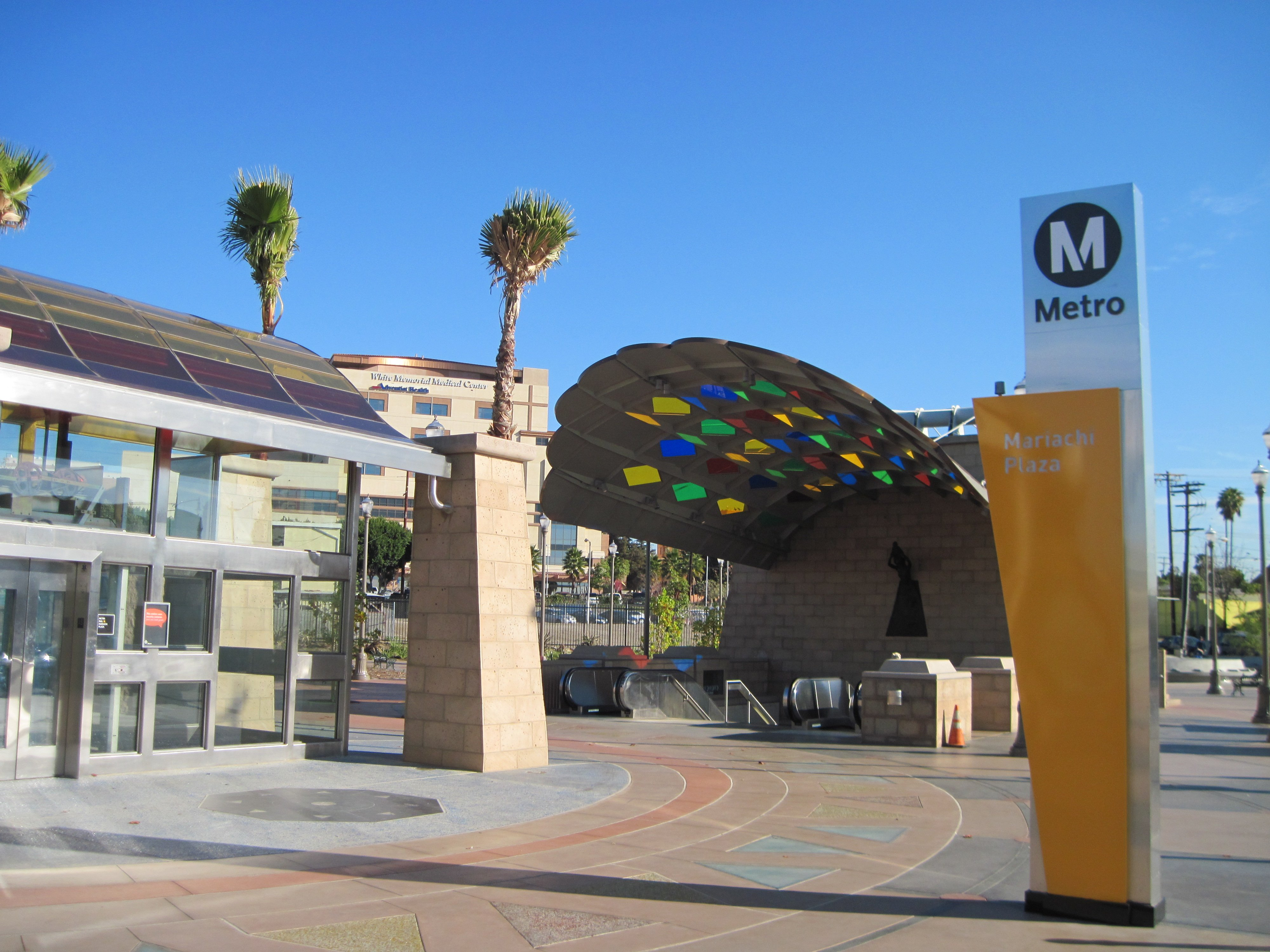
E Line Mariachi Plaza station, 2009

== See also ==
- History of Mexican Americans in Los Angeles
- My Family/Mi Familia, Motion Picture of life in East Los Angeles
- Born in East L.A., motion picture
- Chicano, ethnic term
- Cholo (subculture)
- East LA Classic, football game
- Blood In Blood Out, motion picture
- City Times in Los Angeles Times suburban sections
- Zoot Suit Riots, 1943
- Ten Latino neighborhoods in Los Angeles County
