= Immaculate Heart =

Immaculate Heart may refer to:

- Immaculate Heart of Mary, a religious doctrine related to Sacred Heart of Jesus
- Sisters, Servants of the Immaculate Heart of Mary, a religious order
- Sisters of the Immaculate Heart of Mary, a religious order, and its descendant institutions.
- Congregations of the Heart of Mary, the name of several religious congregations
