= Bishop Amat =

Bishop Amat may refer to:

- Thaddeus Amat y Brusi, first bishop of the Los Angeles Roman Catholic Archdiocese
- Bishop Amat Memorial High School, a Roman Catholic secondary school named in his honor
