= Cathedral of Our Lady of the Angels =

Cathedral and Mother Church of the Archdiocese of Los Angeles

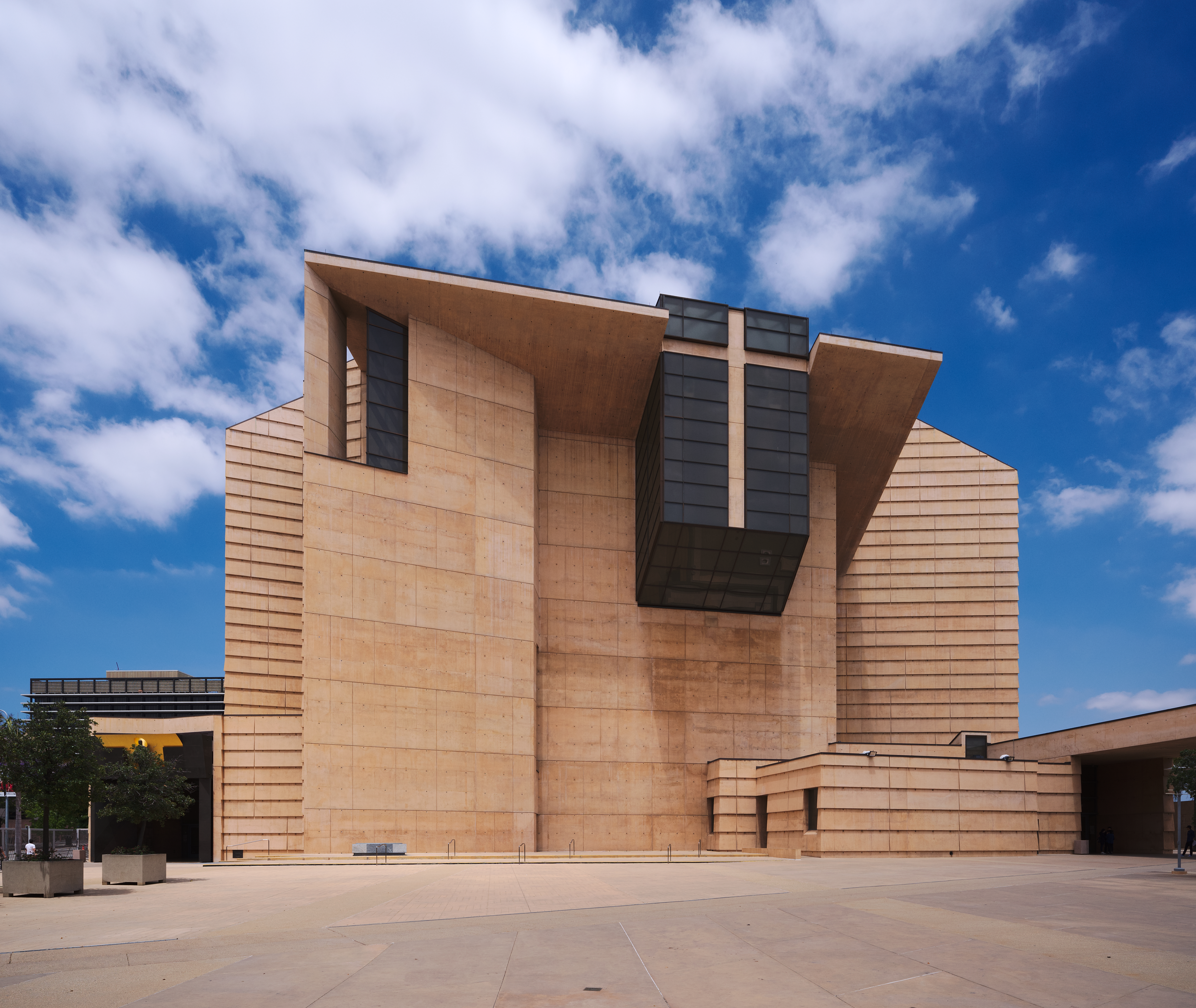
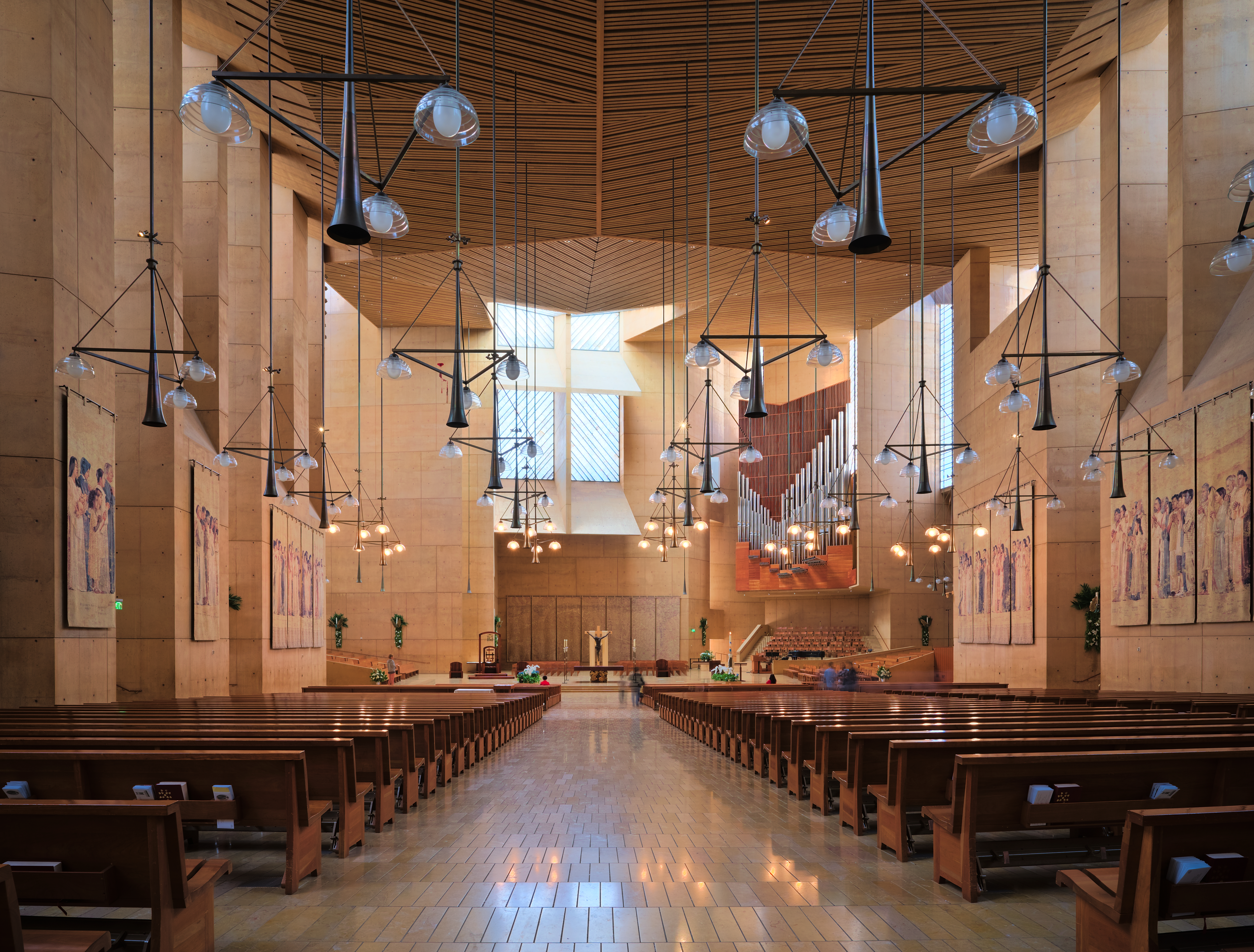
- Catedral de Nuestra Señora de los Ángeles
- Cathedral of Our Lady of the Angels
- 34°3′30″N 118°14′45″W
- Location: 555 W. Temple St. Los Angeles, California
- Country: United States
- Denomination: Catholic Church
- Sui iuris church: Latin Church
- Website: www.olacathedral.org

History
- Founded: 2002
- Dedication: September 2, 2002

Architecture
- Architect: Rafael Moneo
- Style: Modern architecture; deconstructivist elements
- Completed: 2002
- Construction cost: $189.7 million

Specifications
- Capacity: 3,000 people
- Length: 333 feet (101 m) ; nave

Administration
- Archdiocese: Los Angeles

Clergy
- Archbishop: José Horacio Gómez
- Pastor: David Gallardo

The Cathedral of Our Lady of the Angels (Spanish: Catedral de Nuestra Señora de los Ángeles), informally known as the COLA or the Los Angeles Cathedral (Spanish: Catedral de Los Ángeles), is the metropolitan cathedral of the Roman Catholic Church in Los Angeles, California, in the United States. It serves as the mother church for the Archdiocese of Los Angeles, as well as the seat of Archbishop José Horacio Gómez.

The structure replaced the Cathedral of Saint Vibiana, which was severely damaged in the 1994 Northridge earthquake. Under Cardinal Roger Mahony, archbishop of Los Angeles, Our Lady of the Angels was begun in 1998 and dedicated on September 2, 2002. There was considerable controversy over both its deconstructivist and modern design, costs incurred in its construction and furnishing, and the archdiocese's decision to build a crypt under the cathedral.

The cathedral is named in honor of the Virgin Mary under the patronal title of "Our Lady of the Angels". The cathedral contains the relics of Saint Vibiana and tilma piece of Our Lady of Guadalupe. It is the mother church to approximately five million professed Catholics in the archdiocese.

== History ==
=== 1876 to 1994 ===
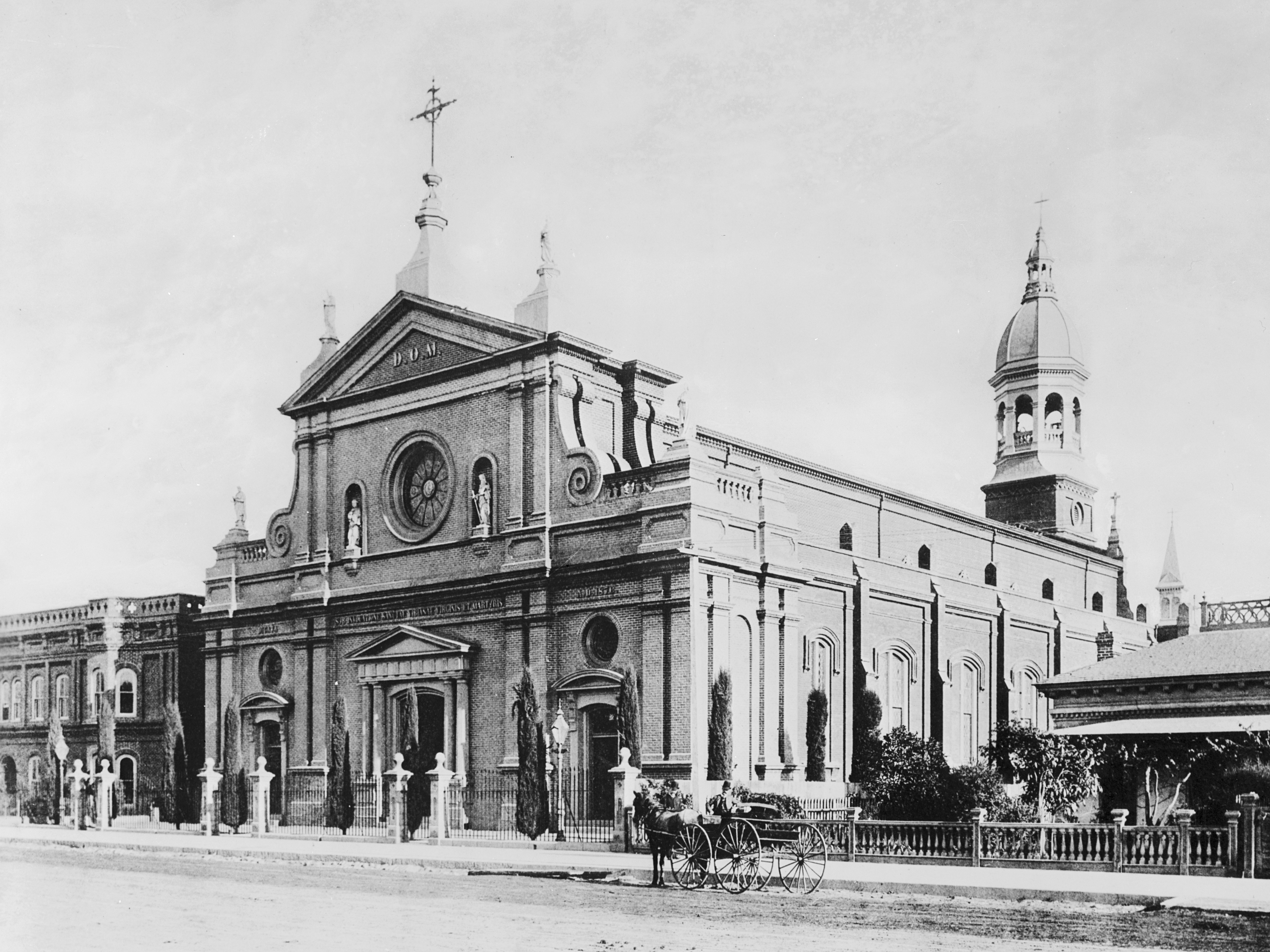
Saint Vibiana Cathedral (1885)

Throughout the 20th century, the Cathedral of Saint Vibiana served as the mother church for the Diocese of Los Angeles. Constructed in 1876, the capacity of the cathedral was soon outstripped by the growth of the Catholic population in Southern California. In addition, major defects in its construction soon became apparent.

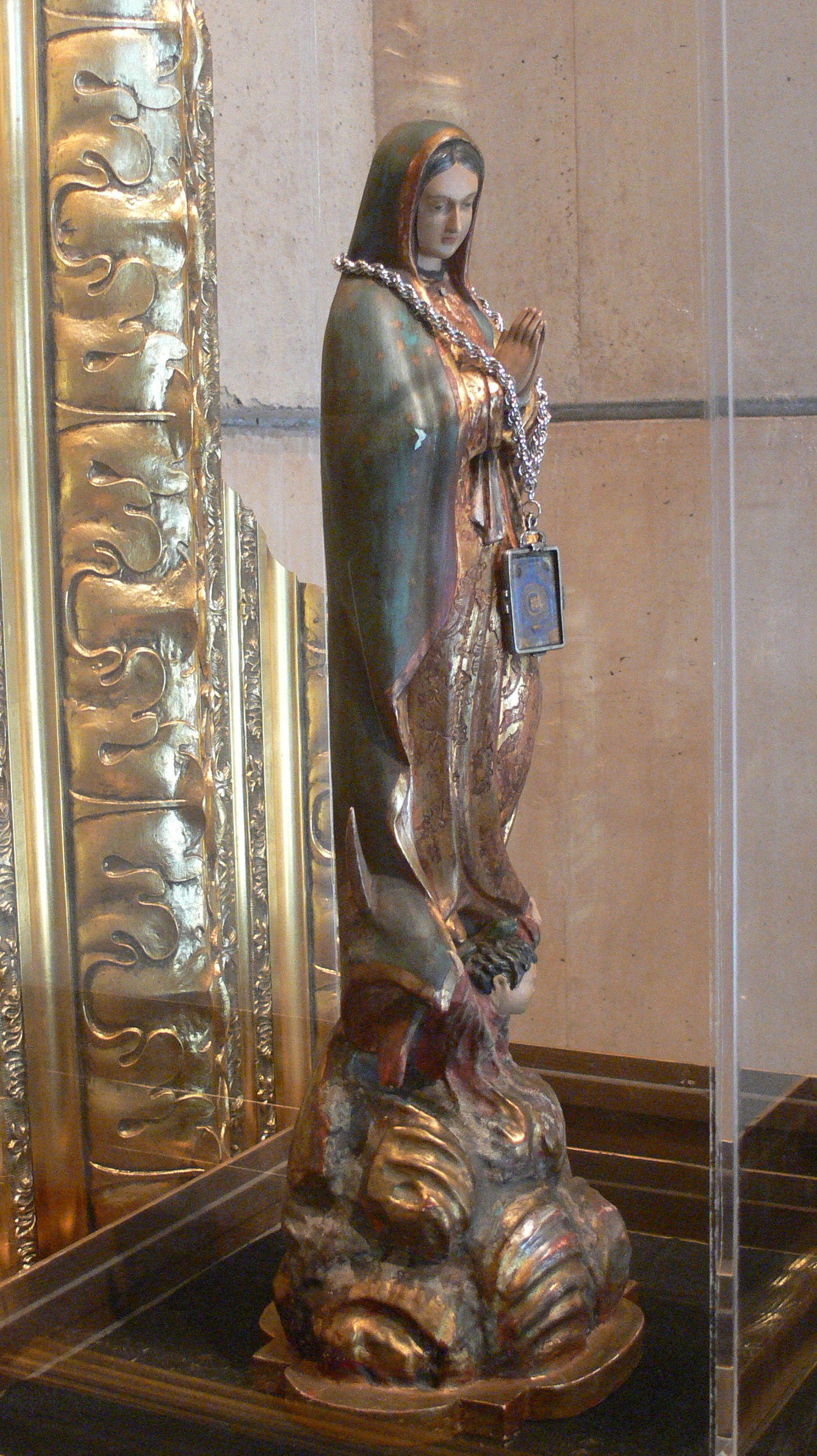
Our Lady of Guadalupe, Our Lady of the Angels Cathedral (2008)

In 1904, Bishop Thomas James Conaty gained permission from the Vatican to build a new cathedral in Los Angeles. However, an economic downturn in 1907 stopped the project. The diocese later constructed a parish church on that site. In 1936, Pope Pius XI elevated the Diocese of Los Angeles to the Archdiocese of Los Angeles.

In 1941, Archbishop John Joseph Cantwell of Los Angeles made a pilgrimage to the Basilica of Our Lady of Guadalupe in Mexico City. While he was there, the Archdiocese of Mexico City presented him with a piece of the tilma, or garment, worn by Juan Diego, a 16th-century Mexican saint. The tilma was placed in Saint Vibiana.

During the 1940s, Archbishop John Joseph Cantwell started planning the new cathedral on Wilshire Boulevard in Los Angeles. He envisioned a place of worship with a seating capacity of 3,000. The Vatican gave him permission to call the new cathedral "Our Lady of the Angels". However, after Cantwell died in 1947, the planning stopped again. His successor, Archbishop James Francis McIntyre, place a greater priority on building new parish churches and schools to meet the expanding Catholic population. McIntyre gained permission from donors to redirect donations for the new cathedral to those needs.

=== 1994 to 2000 ===
The Northridge earthquake in January 1994 caused severe damage to Saint Vibiana, making it unsafe for use. In January 1995, the archdiocese announced plans to demolish Saint Vibiana and build the Cathedral of Our Lady of the Angels on its site. This led to a lengthy legal battle between the archdiocese and preservationists. They argued that since Saint Vibiana was a city landmark, the archdiocese should incorporate it into a new cathedral structure or simply restore it to its original form. The archdiocese replied that restoring Saint Vibiana into a functioning cathedral would cost between $18 to $20 million, and that no one had pledged any money for that purpose.

The legal battle over Saint Vibiana finally prompted the archdiocese to build Our Lady of the Angels elsewhere. In December 1996, the archdiocese announced a site for the cathedral. It had purchased from Los Angeles County for $10.85 million a 5.6-acre (2.3 ha) site between Temple Street and the Hollywood Freeway. The initial budget for the project was $150 million, eventually rising to a final cost of $189.7 million. The ground breaking for Our Lady of the Angels took place on September 21, 1997. Construction began in October 1998 and the excavation for the foundation was in May 1999.

=== 2000 to present ===
The Cathedral of Our Lady of the Angels was dedicated on September 2, 2002. The current Dobson organ in the cathedral was installed and dedicated in 2003. Archbishop José H. Gomez in September 2012 dedicated a new chapel in the cathedral for the tilma relic of Juan Diego. Gomez place the piece of tilma in a golden reliquary inside a bronze sculpture of the saint.

In May 2022, several women dressed in large hats and red cloaks with hoods disrupted a Sunday mass at the cathedral. The cloaks were similar to those worn by characters in the TV series The Handmaid's Tale. Cathedral staff quickly intercepted the protestors and escorted them out of the building. Thousands of mourners attended a funeral mass at the cathedral in March 2023 for Auxiliary Bishop David G. O'Connell. He had been murdered by the husband of his housekeeper.

During the spring of 2025, the Cathedral Plaza became the location for many protests against raids by U.S. Immigration and Customs Enforcement (ICE) looking to detain undocumented immigrants. That month, the National Eucharistic Pilgrimage was to conclude with a procession in the streets of Los Angeles. However, given the anxiety raised by ICE among many Catholics in the archdiocese, the procession was relocated to Cathedral Plaza.

== Design ==
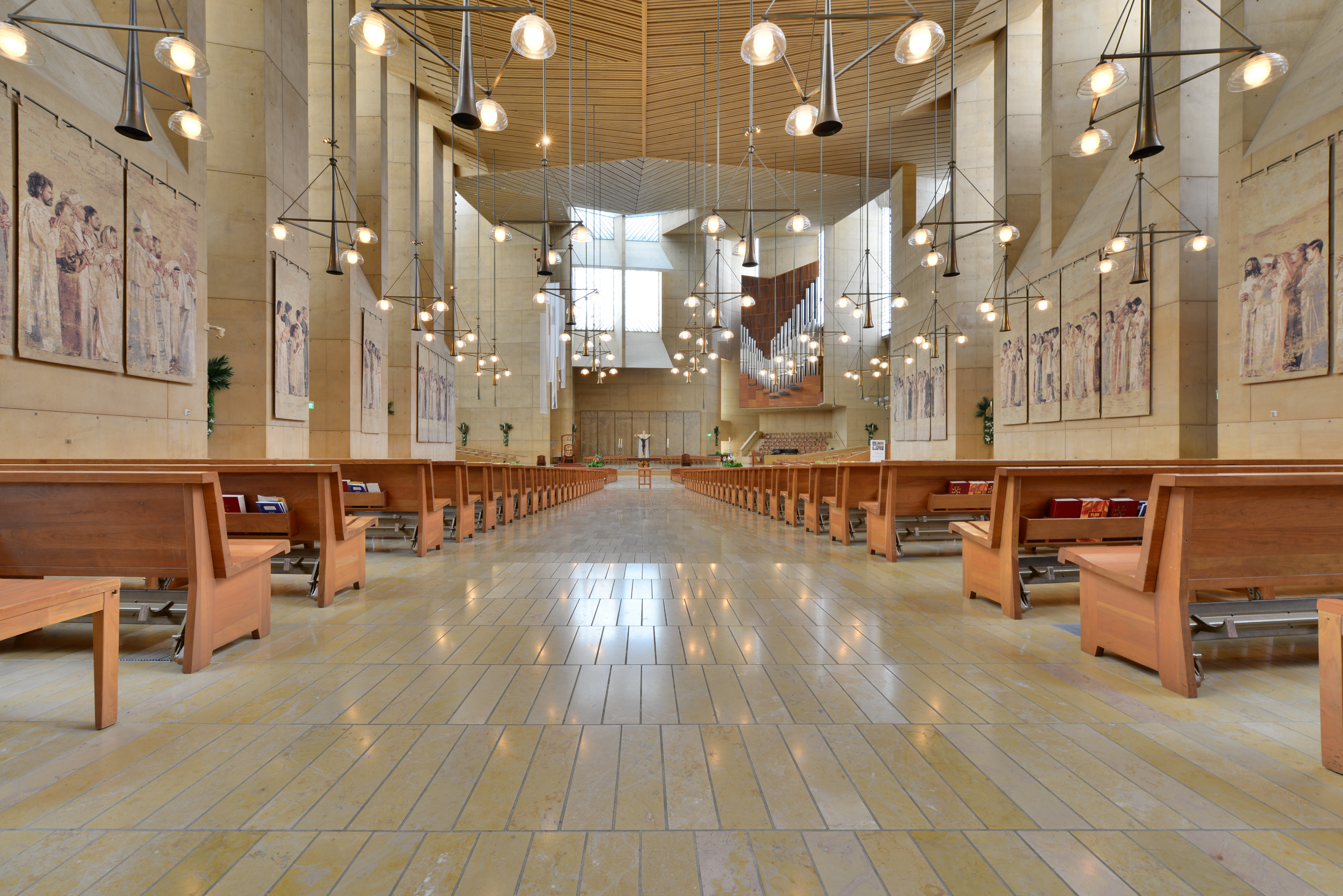
Nave, Our Lady of the Angels Cathedral (2013)

The architectural design was selected from a pool of 38 submissions from international architectural firms by a jury of experts. These experts came from the J. Paul Getty Trust, California Institute of the Arts, the University of California Los Angeles, the University of Southern California, Harvard University and the American Academy in Rome. However, the decision to build a cathedral utilizing contemporary architecture drew criticisms from those who preferred the Gothic Revival stylings typical of preceding centuries.

Mahony hired the Spanish Rafael Moneo to serve as architect. The construction was supervised by Reverend Richard S. Vosko, a liturgical design consultant.

Using elements of postmodern architecture, the church and the Cathedral Center feature a series of acute and obtuse angles while avoiding right angles. Contemporary statuary and appointments decorate the complex. Prominent of these appointments are the bronze doors and The Virgin Mary statue, all adorning the entrance and designed by Robert Graham. Other features include three fountains and a bronze sculpture by Johnny Bear Contreras dedicated as a Native American memorial. The building is equipped with solar panels for generating 15% of its electricity.

The cathedral also include a mausoleum, gift shop, cafe, children's garden, conference center, and clergy residences. The relics of Saint Vibiana are interred in the Saint Vibiana Chapel. The size of the cathedral is 6,038 m^{2} (64,990 sq ft).

== Criticism ==
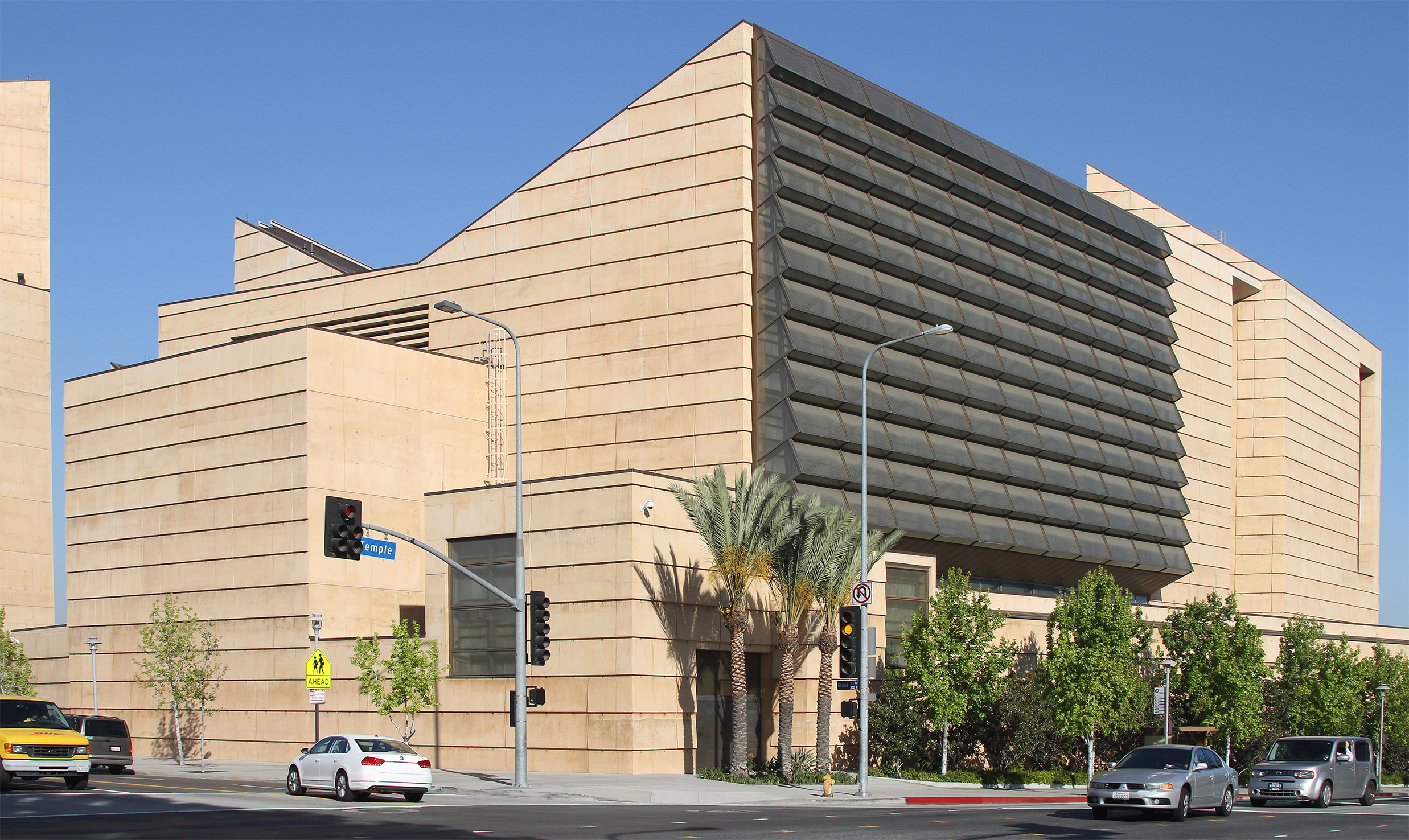
View from Grand Ave and Temple Street, Our Lady of the Angels Cathedral (2012)

At the time of its announcement, critics argued that Our Lady of the Angels would be too big, too expensive and overly elaborate. They said that the archdiocese should be spending the cathedral money on programs for the poor. Some suggested that St. Vincent Church or St. Basil Church, both in Los Angeles, could suffice as cathedrals, despite their smaller sizes, with minimal additional cost.

In response, Cardinal Roger Mahony stated that the parishes would not pay for the cathedral construction. He urged major donors to maintain their current or future funding of social services for the poor. He also released a summary of total construction costs to the press. Speaking of the need for cathedrals, Mahony said:

"Historically, cathedrals have defined their eras, creating a legacy of enduring and innovative architectural designs. They have served as a focal point for artistic and religious expression through their acquisition from local artisans of the adornments that distinguish and enhance the structure, and through the central role they have played in preserving and expanding the spiritual and liturgical teachings that define the Catholic faith. . . . This project will serve a vital role in our society - contributing to the architectural, religious and cultural persona of downtown Los Angeles".

In response to protests staged during the cathedral construction, Mahony wrote an opinion piece for the Los Angeles Times in October 1998, stating:

"The Catholic Worker and others shortchange the poor when they adopt the stance that the Church should be attentive only to the material concerns of the needy. This is out of step with Church history and with the teaching of Jesus, who said that people do not live by bread alone. There are various kinds of poverty, of which material poverty is but one."

== Description of Cathedral ==
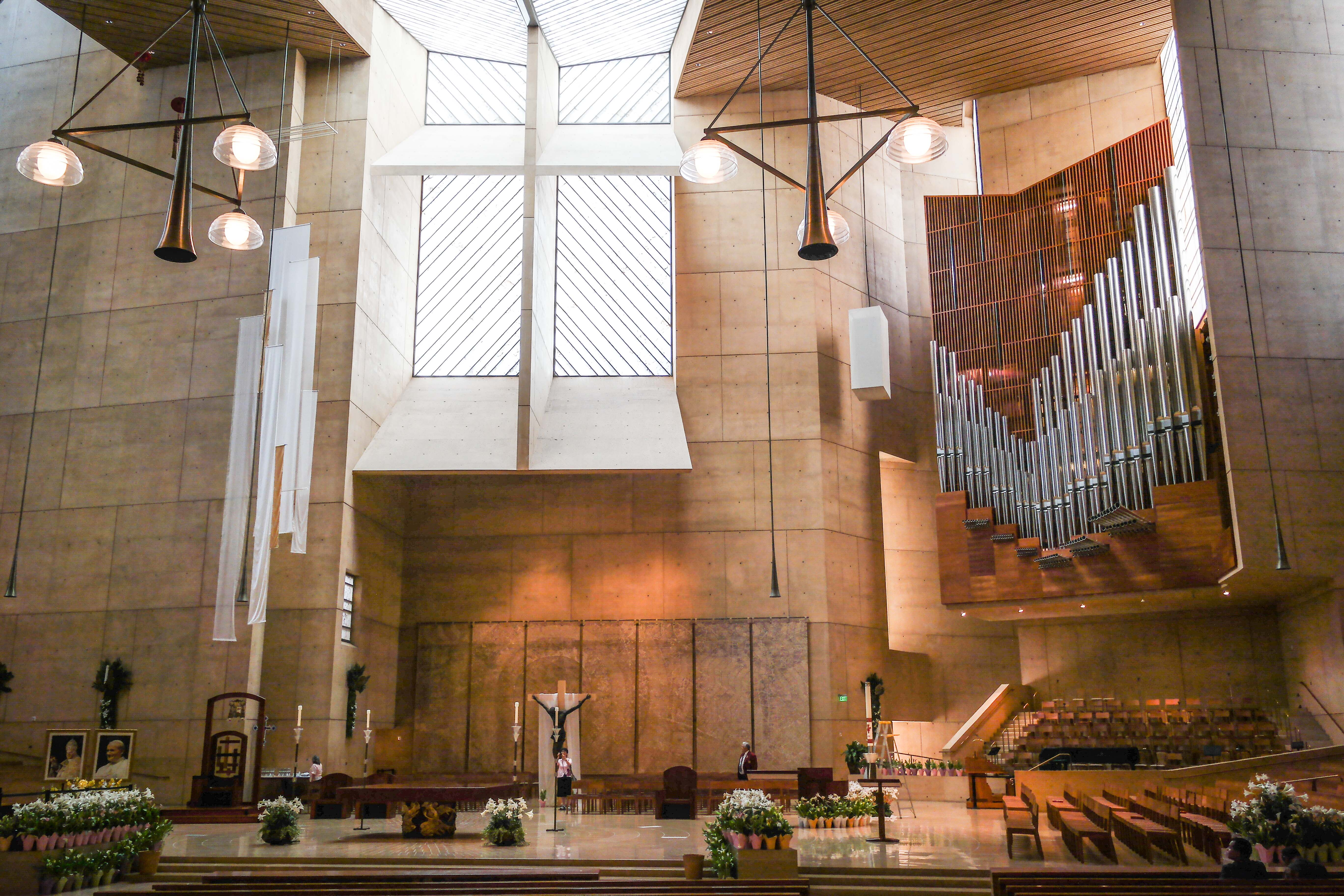
Organ, Our Lady of the Angels Cathedral

=== Organ ===
The organ used in Our Lady of the Angels Cathedral is Opus 75, constructed by Dobson Pipe Organ Builders of Lake City, Iowa. It is a 105 rank four-manual instrument that incorporates pipes from the 1929 Wangerin organ of St. Vibiana Cathedral.

The Opus 75 organ has 6,019 pipes. It is the 89th largest pipe organ in North America and the 143rd largest in the world. The organ case is approximately 60 feet (18 m) high, and is located approximately 24 feet (7.3 m) above floor level. To meet earthquake-stability requirements, the pipes and case are supported by a massive internal steel frame.

=== Saint Vibiana Chapel ===
The tomb of Saint Vibiana was transferred to Our Lady of the Angels from its previous location above the altar at Saint Vibiana. The tomb became the centerpiece of this chapel, located adjacent to the mausoleum.

=== Mausoleum ===
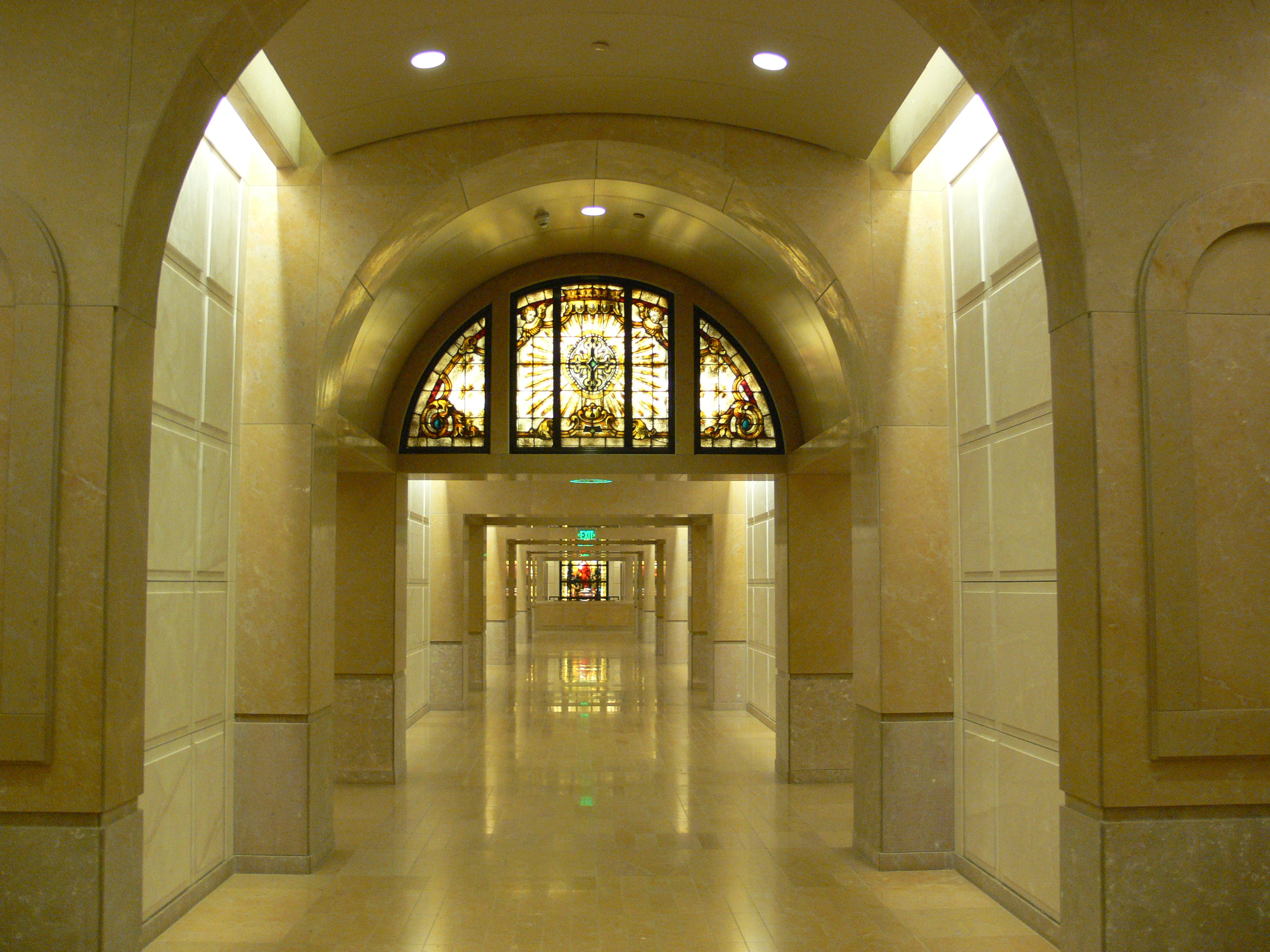
Mausoleum, Our Lady of the Angels Cathedral (2008)

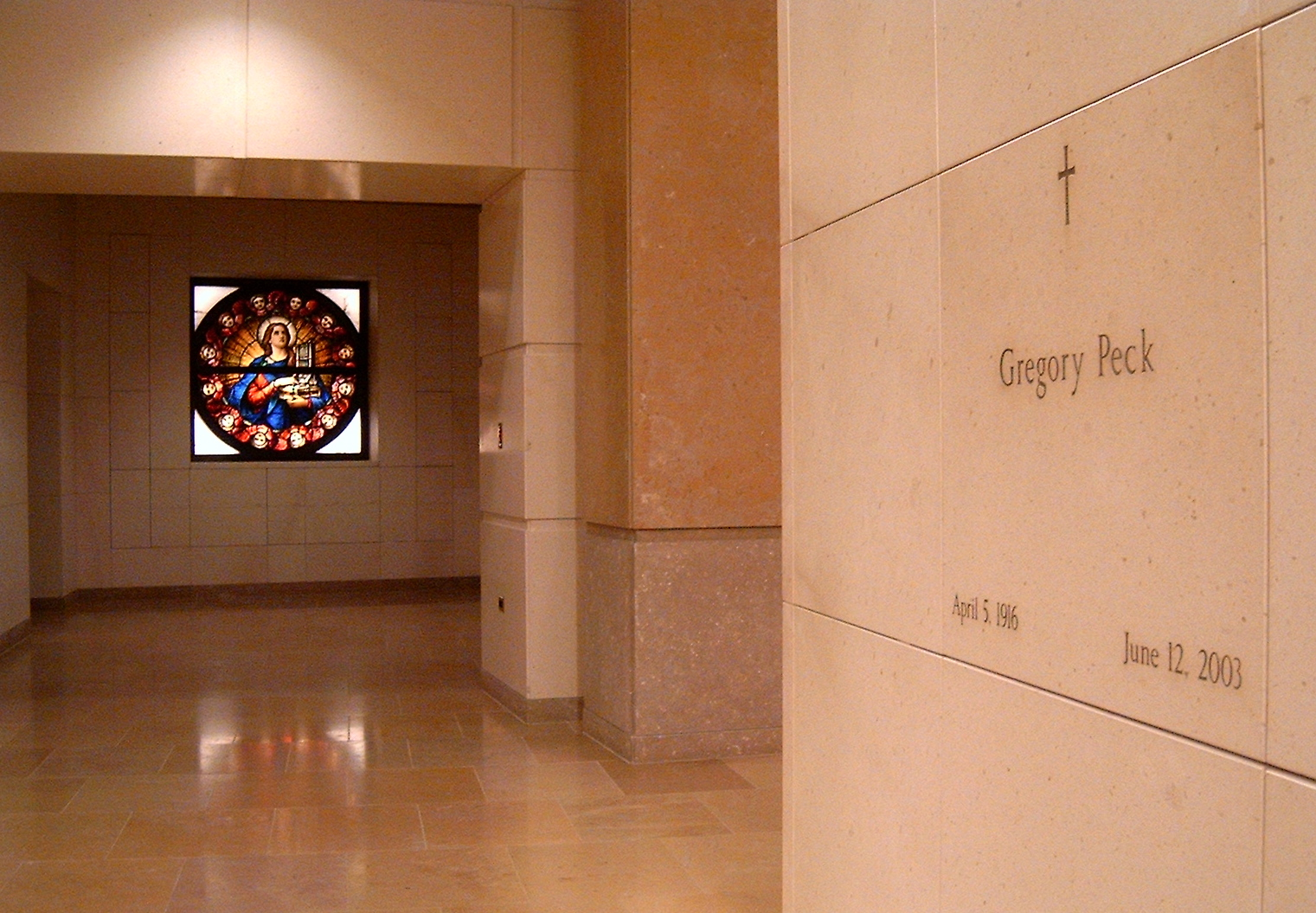
Burial niche of actor Gregory Peck, mausoleum, Our Lady of the Angels Cathedral (2005)

Our Lady of the Angels Cathedral features a mausoleum in its lower level, containing 1,270 crypts and 4,746 columbarium niches for burials. Proceeds from the sale of memorials and burial spaces go to an endowment fund to support the cathedral.

All the past bishops and archbishops of the archdiocese are memorialized in the mausoleum. The remains of several ordinaries and auxiliary bishops who died before the cathedral was built, were transferred here.

The mausoleum features several stained glass windows, all restored, from Saint Vibiana Cathedral. Two new windows, depicting guardian angels, were created by the Judson Studios and installed at the mausoleum entrance.

== Individuals interred in mausoleum ==
=== Clergy ===
- Bishop Juan Alfredo Arzube
- Bishop Carl Anthony Fisher
- Bishop David G. O'Connell
- Archbishop James Francis McIntyre, second archbishop of Los Angeles
- Archbishop John Cantwell, first archbishop of Los Angeles
- Bishop John J. Ward
- Bishop Thaddeus Amat y Brusi, first bishop of Los Angeles
- Bishop Thomas James Conaty

=== Laity ===
- Adelina Naccarelli de Koenig, better known as "Della Koenig", philanthropist, patron of the arts, former singer and actress
- Bernardine Murphy Donohue, philanthropist and papal countess
- Daniel J. Donahue, philanthropist and papal gentleman
- Gregory Peck, actor
- June Marlowe, actress
- Ron Popeil, inventor
- Veronique Peck, wife of Gregory Peck
- Victor and Loretta Baron Mahony, parents of Cardinal Roger Mahony

== Events ==
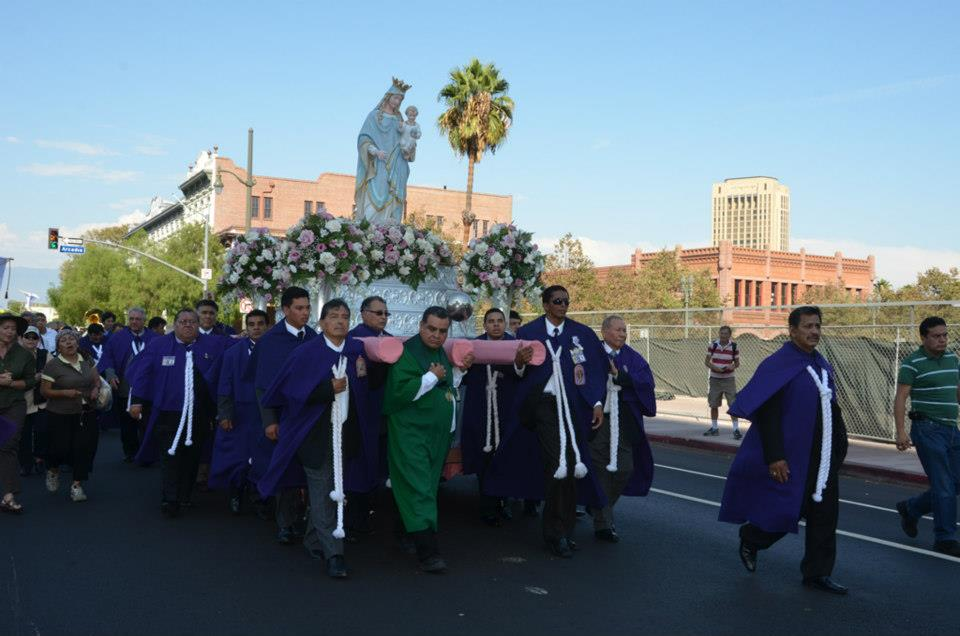
2012 Grand Marian Procession through Downtown Los Angeles

On September 3, 2011, the cathedral hosted a votive mass in honor of the Blessed Virgin Mary. It marked the conclusion of the First Annual Grand Marian Procession, organized by the Queen of Angels Foundation. The cathedral hosts occasional musical performances, including concerts by Libera.

== Cathedral pastors ==
- Monsignor Kevin Kostelnik, 2002 – 2017
- Reverend David Gallardo, 2017 – 2022
- Monsignor Antonio Cacciapuoti, 2022 – 2025
- Reverend David Gallardo, 2025 – present

== See also ==
- List of Catholic cathedrals in the United States
- List of cathedrals in the United States
- Roman Catholic Marian churches
