= Congregations of the Heart of Mary =

Congregation of the Heart of Mary is a name that applies to various Roman Catholic religious Congregations, most of them for women.

== Daughters of the Immaculate Heart of Mary ==
The Daughters of the Immaculate Heart of Mary took that name as an association of ladies in charge of the home for incurables at Rennes, on their organization into a religious community in 1841. The home had been consistently though unofficially in existence since 1700.

== Sisters of the Holy Heart of Mary ==
The Sisters of the Holy Heart of Mary were founded in 1842 at Nancy, by Alexis-Basile-Alexandre Menjaud, later Bishop of Nancy and Toul, for the purpose of instructing young girls in various trades, and protecting their virtue. The statutes, drawn up by Masson, the vicar of Flers, provide that the congregation shall own nothing but the houses which they occupy; that everything over and above shall go to the maintenance of poor children and the decoration of altars. The devotion of perpetual adoration was instituted in the mother-house.

== Sisters of the Immaculate Heart of Mary ==
The Sisters of the Immaculate Heart of Mary (IHM), founded as the Daughters of the Most Holy and Immaculate Heart of the Blessed Virgin Mary, is a Catholic religious teaching institute for women, founded in Spain in 1848 by Joaquim Masmitjà as a means of rebuilding society through the education of young women. A daughter house of the community was founded in Los Angeles, California, USA, in 1871, and in 1924 formally separated from the Spanish congregation and was established as a distinct institute in its own right.

== Sister-Servants of the Holy Heart of Mary ==
The Sister-Servants of the Holy Heart of Mary were founded at Paris, in 1860, by François Delaplace and Marie-Jeanne Moisan, for the Christian education of children, and the visitation and care of the sick in hospitals and in their own homes. This congregation is particularly flourishing in Canada, where about 140 sisters have charge of about 2500 children. There are six communities in the United States.

== Daughters of the Holy Heart of Mary ==
The Daughters of the Holy Heart of Mary were founded by Aloyse Kobès, at Dakar, Senegal on 24 May 1858, for native women. They serve the community by teaching, visiting various mission stations, caring for the sick, and preparing catechumens for baptism. Their immunity from yellow fever enabled them to care for the Europeans stricken during epidemics. In the Vicariate of Senegambia were six communities with about forty sisters.

== Congregation of the Holy and Immaculate Heart of Mary ==
The Congregation of the Holy and Immaculate Heart of Mary was founded, at the desire of the Synod of Pondicherry, by Louis-Savinien Dupuis for the Christian education of young Indian girls. Despite prejudices against the education of women, the congregation gradually took charge of orphanages, pharmacies and schools. Most of the sisters have government certificates of proficiency in the various grades.

== Sisters of the Holy and Immaculate Heart of Mary ==
The Sisters of the Holy and Immaculate Heart of Mary were founded in July, 1848, at Pico Heights, Los Angeles, California, U.S.A. In the Diocese of Monterey and Los Angeles the sisters number about 110, and have charge of about 700 children and 60 orphans, in 1 college, 5 academies, and 1 orphan asylum.

== Sister-Servants of the Immaculate Heart of Mary ==
The Sister-Servants of the Immaculate Heart of Mary were founded at Quebec in 1859 by Pierre-Flavien Turgeon, Archbishop of Quebec, and Marie-Josephte Fitzbach, to shelter penitent girls, and provide Christian education for children. The congregation now numbers about 400 members in the United States and Canada in charge of 26 establishments, 152 penitents, and about 5500 children.

== Sisters, Servants of the Immaculate Heart of Mary ==
The Sisters, Servants of the Immaculate Heart of Mary were founded at Monroe, Michigan, U.S.A. on 28 November 1845 by Louis Florent Gillet, for the work of teaching. In 1856 an independent mother-house was established at Villa Maria, Westchester County, Pennsylvania, and later a third at Scranton, Pennsylvania. The congregation took charge of academies, normal schools, parochial schools and asylums in eleven dioceses, and number about 1200 sisters.

== Missionary Sons of the Immaculate Heart of Mary ==
The Missionary Sons of the Immaculate Heart of Mary or Claretians were founded at Vic, Catalonia, in 1848, by Anthony Mary Claret (d. 1870). They took charge of a mission on Fernando Po, and stations at Corisco and Annobón in Western Africa.

== Congregation of the Immaculate Heart of Mary ==
The Congregation of the Immaculate Heart of Mary, also called the Congregation of Scheutveld, was founded in 1862 by Theophiel Verbist (d. 1865), a former military chaplain, for mission work, especially in China. The congregation in the early 20th century numbered over 300 members in charge of the Vicariates Apostolic of Central, Eastern and South-Western Mongolia, and in China the Vicariate of Northern Kan-su and the Prefecture Apostolic of Southern Kan-su, where in all about 155 priests have charge of about 51,600 Catholics, 20,000 catechumens, 250 churches and chapels, and 263 schools, with an attendance of 6000; in Africa, in the Vicariate Apostolic of Belgian Congo and the Prefecture Apostolic of Upper Kassai, 52 priests and 20 lay brothers are over about 15,000 Catholics, 29,300 catechumens, 38 churches and chapels and 28 schools, attended by 2300 children.

== Congregation of the Sisters of the Immaculate Heart of Mary ==
The Congregation of the Sisters of the Immaculate Heart of Mary were founded at Vienna, in 1843, by Barbara Maix (d. 1873), and in 1848 established in Brazil, where, in addition to the mother-house at Porto Alegre, they have institutions elsewhere, chiefly orphan asylums.

== Sisters of the Sacred Heart of Mary ==
The Sisters of the Sacred Heart of Mary were founded in 1848 by Jean Gailhac at Béziers in the Diocese of Montpellier, for the work of teaching and the care of orphans. They were approved by Pius IX and Leo XIII and started institutions in Ireland, England, Portugal and the United States.
