= George Thomas Montgomery =

American prelate

His Excellency, The Most Reverend George Thomas Montgomery
- Coadjutor Archbishop of San Francisco; Titular Archbishop of Axum
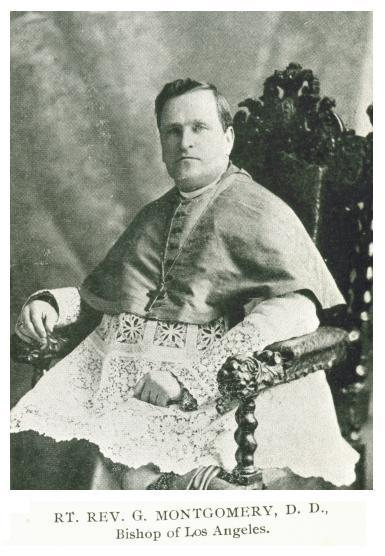
- Church: Catholic Church
- Archdiocese: San Francisco
- Appointed: September 17, 1902
- Term ended: January 10, 1907 (his death)
- Previous posts: Bishop of Monterey-Los Angeles (1896–1902); Coadjutor Bishop of Monterey-Los Angeles (1894–1896); Titular Bishop of Thmuis

Orders
- Ordination: December 20, 1879 by James Gibbons
- Consecration: April 8, 1894 by Patrick William Riordan

Personal details
- Born: August 30, 1847 Daviess County, Kentucky, U.S.
- Died: January 10, 1907 (aged 59) San Francisco, California, U.S.
- Motto: Deus providebit (God will provide)

George Thomas Montgomery (December 30, 1847 – January 10, 1907) was an American prelate of the Catholic Church. He was the first American-born Bishop of Monterey-Los Angeles (1896–1902) and later served as Coadjutor Archbishop of San Francisco from 1902 until his death in 1907.

== Early life and education ==
George Montgomery was born on December 30, 1847, on a farm in Daviess County, Kentucky. He was one of nine children of Pius Michael and Harriet Elizabeth (née Warren) Montgomery; his uncle was the journalist Zachariah Montgomery and his cousin, Zachariah's son, was John Joseph Montgomery, a pioneer of aviation George's mother died of typhoid fever when he was ten years old, leaving him to be raised by his Aunt Margaret Montgomery Head.

George Montgomery worked in farming until 1867, when he entered Cecilian College, an all-male boarding school near Elizabethtown, Kentucky. After deciding to enter the priesthood, he was sponsored by his uncle Zachariah, now living in California, as a student for the Archdiocese of San Francisco. Montgomery attended St. Charles College in Ellicott City, Maryland, from 1871 to 1875 and completed his studies at St. Mary's Seminary in Baltimore, Maryland.

== Priesthood ==
Montgomery was ordained a priest for the Archdiocese of Baltimore in Baltimore on December 20, 1879, by Archbishop James Gibbons. After arriving in San Francisco, Archbishop Joseph Sadoc Alemany.appointed Montgomery as his private secretary. When Patrick William Riordan succeeded Alemany in 1884, he retained Montgomery as secretary and also named him chancellor of the archdiocese.

In San Francisco, Montgomery became known as "one of the foremost temperance advocates that California has ever known." He described alcohol abuse as "not only debauching our young men and women, not only affecting the individual as an individual, but as a citizen—a factor of society." In 1886, he established a local chapter of the League of the Cross, which encouraged young men to abstain from alcohol until they turned 21. By 1894, the San Francisco league had grown to 4,000 members.

== Episcopal career ==
=== Coadjutor Bishop and Bishop of Monterey-Los Angeles ===
Illustration created by American Protective Society

On January 26, 1894, Pope Leo XIII appointed Montgomery as titular bishop of Thmuis and coadjutor bishop of Monterey-Los Angeles to assist Bishop Francisco Mora y Borrell.Montgomery received his episcopal consecration at St. Mary's Cathedral in Los Angeles on April 8, 1894, from Riordan, with Bishops Jean-Baptiste Brondel and Lawrence Scanlan serving as co-consecrators.

Montgomery assisted Mora with the management of diocesan affairs until the latter's resignation, becoming the first American-born bishop of Monterey-Los Angeles on May 6, 1896. In response to the growing influence of the anti-Catholic American Protective Association in Los Angeles, he organized a branch of the Catholic Truth Society in 1896.

When it came to more secular issues, Montgomery believed, "If ever the respective rights and duties of labor and capital are to be even properly defined, it must be upon the principles which religion lays down." In 1899, he was invited to attend a public address by the socialist political leader Eugene V. Debs. During the address, Debs pointed to an American flag over his head and said, "These very stars and stripes, our emblem of liberty, are manufactured in a sweatshop"; when it was Montgomery's turn to speak, the bishop declared, "If that flag was made in a sweatshop, it floats over the freest country on the face of the earth."

=== Coadjutor Archbishop of San Francisco ===
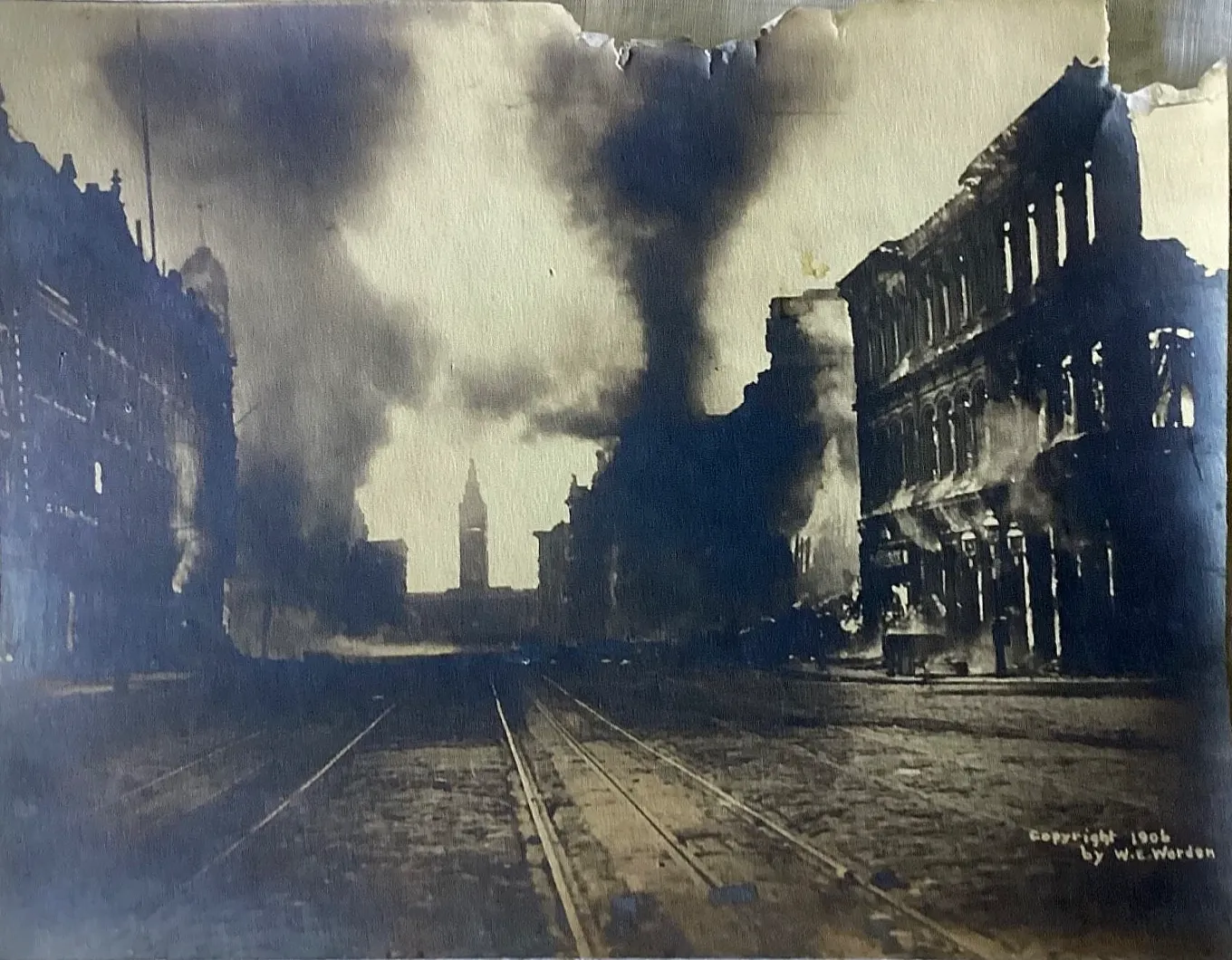
Aftermath of San Francisco earthquake (1906)

On September 17, 1902, Montgomery was appointed coadjutor archbishop of San Francisco, with the right of succession to his former superior Archbishop Riordan, as well as titular archbishop of Axum.

At the time of the 1906 San Francisco earthquake, Riordan was away on travel and it was Montgomery who led the archdiocese's immediate response to the disaster and helped extinguish a fire at St. Mary's Cathedral. A few days later, he wrote to his successor in Los Angeles, Thomas James Conaty, to say "I do not know how I have lived through [it]" and to praise the “good humor, the common interest, and forgetfulness of self that are everywhere."

== Death ==
Montgomery died suddenly from complications from appendicitis and diabetes in San Francisco on January 10, 1907. He is buried at Holy Cross Cemetery in Colma, California.

Catholic Church titles
| Preceded by Francisco Mora y Borrell | Bishop of Monterey-Los Angeles; 1896–1902 | Succeeded by Thomas James Conaty |
