= Thomas James Conaty =

American Catholic bishop (1847–1915)

His Excellency, The Right Reverend Thomas James Conaty
- Bishop of Monterey-Los Angeles; Titular Bishop of Samos
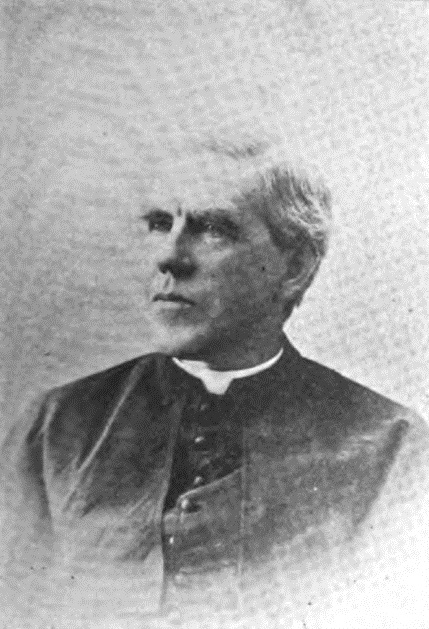
- Church: Catholic Church
- Diocese: Monterey-Los Angeles
- Appointed: March 27, 1903
- Term ended: September 18, 1915 (his death)
- Predecessor: George Thomas Montgomery
- Successor: John Joseph Cantwell
- Other post: Rector of the Catholic University of America (1896-1903)

Orders
- Ordination: December 21, 1872 by Ignace Bourget
- Consecration: November 24, 1901 by James Gibbons

Personal details
- Born: August 1, 1847 Kilnaleck, County Cavan, Ireland
- Died: September 18, 1915 (aged 68) Coronado, California, U.S.
- Education: College of the Holy Cross (BA); Grand Séminaire de Montréal

Thomas James Conaty (August 1, 1847 – September 18, 1915) was an American prelate of the Catholic Church. He served as rector of the Catholic University of America (CUA) in Washington D.C. (1896–1903) and bishop of Monterey-Los Angeles in California (1903–1915).

== Early life and education ==
Thomas Conaty was born on August 1, 1847, in Kilnaleck, County Cavan, the eldest of eight children of Patrick and Alice (née Lynch) Conaty. The family immigrated to the United States in May 1850 and settled in Taunton, Massachusetts, his father's former residence.

After receiving his early education in the public schools of Taunton, Conaty entered the Collège de Montréal in Montreal, Quebec, in 1863. He remained there for three years, then enrolled at the College of the Holy Cross in Worcester, Massachusetts, in 1867, graduating two years later. Conaty finished his preparation for the priesthood studying theology at the Grand Séminaire in Montreal.

== Priesthood ==
While in Montreal, Conaty was ordained a priest on December 21, 1872, by Bishop Ignace Bourget. He was ordained for the Diocese of Springfield in Massachusetts, where Bishop Patrick Thomas O'Reilly was a relative. Conaty's younger brother Bernard would also become a priest in 1882.

Following his return from Montreal in 1873, O'Reilly assigned Conaty as an assistant pastor at St. John's Parish in Worcester. That same year, Conaty was first elected to the Worcester school board, serving for the next 14 years. He was also elected to two six-year terms on the board of the Worcester Public Library. Over a century later, Pope John Paul II would forbid priests from holding public office.

When the diocese divided St. John's Parish to created Sacred Heart Parish in 1880, Conaty was named as its first pastor. He build a church, which was dedicated in 1884, along with a school, rectory, convent, and gymnasium.

In addition to his pastoral duties, Conaty was active in the temperance movement. He organized a diocesan chapter of the Catholic Total Abstinence Union of America in Springfield and became its first president in 1877. He eventually rose to become national president of the Total Abstinence Union, serving from 1888 to 1889. Conaty was also involved in the causes of Irish nationalism, serving as an officer in the American chapter of Irish National Land League, an organization seeking to end tenant farming in Ireland. He was also the treasurer of the Irish National League of Massachusetts, the successor to the Irish National Land League. Conaty received an honorary doctorate from Georgetown University in Washington D.C. in 1889.

In 1892, Conaty became the first president of the Catholic Summer School of America. Meeting first at New London, Connecticut, and then at Plattsburgh, New York, the summer school became a destination for Catholic families, high-ranking clergy, distinguished lecturers, and prominent politicians seeking lectures and university courses. In 1896, Conaty established dormitories, a dining hall, and an administration building while registering thousands of individuals from the United States and Canada.

== Rector of the Catholic University of America ==
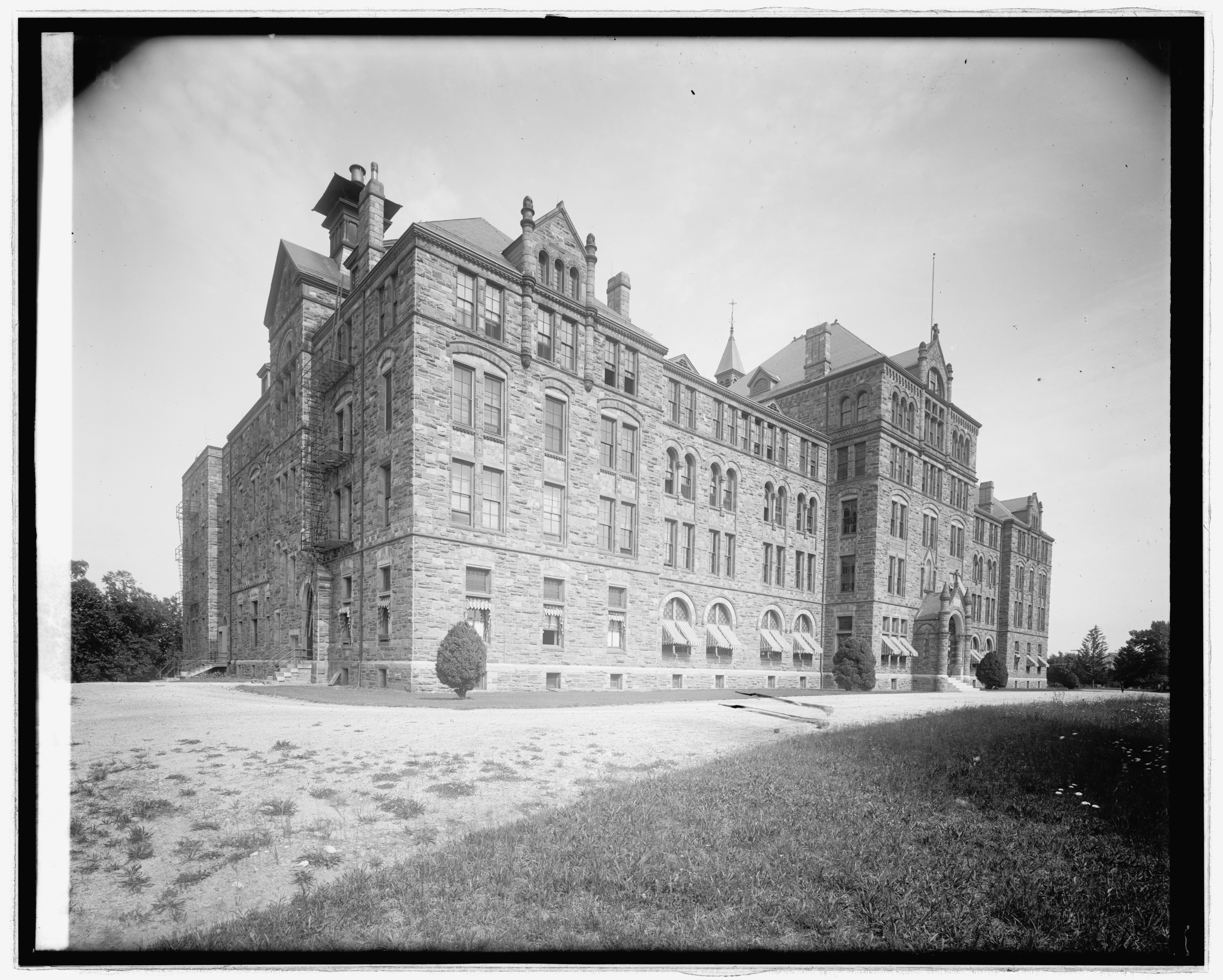
Catholic University of America, Washington, D.C. (1910)

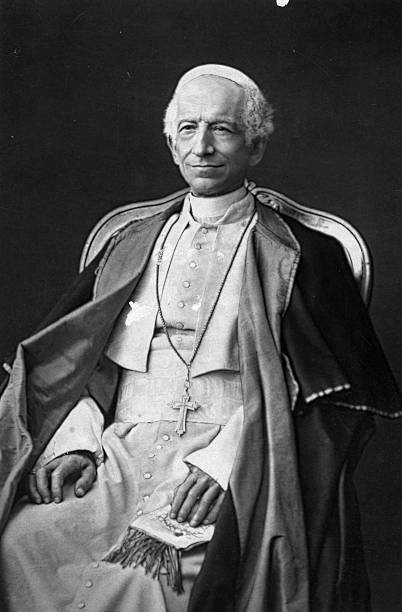
Pope Leo XIII (1878)

In September 1896, Pope Leo XIII removed Bishop John J. Keane as rector of The Catholic University of America. This was allegedly due to Keane's liberal-leaning policies. This happened during a national conflict between traditional members of the American hierarchy who favored more control by the Vatican and liberals who want American bishops to wield more power. The Keane removal led to rumors that the board of trustees would also remove Cardinal James Gibbons, the CUA chancellor, and Archbishop John Ireland, a trustee, from their positions. At a meeting in October 1896, the board selected three candidates for rector to send to the pope: Conaty; Reverend Daniel J. Riordan of Chicago and Reverend Joseph F. Mooney, vicar general of the Archdiocese of New York. Conaty was neither an outspoken liberal nor conservative, making him acceptable to both sides. In November 1896, the pope selected Conaty as the new rector. He was installed by Gibbons on January 19, 1897.

At the time of Conaty's appointment as rector, Cardinal Mariano Rampolla wrote to Gibbons to say that Leo XIII wanted to bestow ecclesiastical honor upon Conaty "in order to add dignity to the office." Gibbons suggested appointing Conaty a bishop but Rampolla replied that it was too soon to elevate him to that rank. Instead, Leo XIII elevated Conaty to the rank of domestic prelate in June 1897.

Soon after Conaty entered office, a group of faculty and trustees demanded that his dismiss the conservative professor of dogmatic theology, Reverend Joseph Schroeder, whom they believed played a role in Keane's removal. Conaty then asked the CUA trustees to remove Schroeder to restore peace among the faculty. After a heated discussion between liberal and conservative members, the board recommended Schroeder's dismissal, but left the decision to the pope. Leo XIII ultimately settled the case by transferring Schroeder to the University of Münster in the German Empire later in 1897.

During the Spanish–American War of 1898, Conaty allowed CUA students who volunteered for military service an additional year to complete their degrees after their discharged from the military. In 1900, CUA became a charter member of the Association of American Universities. That same year, Conaty welcomed a visit from US President William McKinley. Noting the university's acceptance of African-American students, Conaty told McKinley that the university, "like the Catholic Church...knows no race line and no color line."

Financial issues arose after the 1897–1898 school year left CUA with a balance of only $3,000. In 1901, the board appointed a special committee to investigate the university's finances It concluded in 1902 that "in the management of the university funds there has been not only a lack of business method and of competency, but an almost culpable negligence."

Leo XIII appointed Conaty as titular bishop of Samos, an honorary position, on October 5, 1901. He received his episcopal consecration on November 24, 1901, from Gibbons, with Bishops Camillus Paul Maes and Thomas Daniel Beaven serving as co-consecrators, at the Cathedral of the Assumption in Baltimore, Maryland.

As discontent grew with Conaty management of CUA among faculty and trustees, discussion began on replacing him once his term expired. Reverend Denis J. O'Connell, the former rector of the Pontifical North American College in Rome, soon emerged as the leading candidate. Archbishop Patrick William Riordan of San Francisco, a CUA trustee, suggested that Leo XIII name Conaty as bishop of the vacant Diocese of Monterey-Los Angeles in California.

== Bishop of Monterey-Los Angeles ==
Despite opposition from some California priests to having a bishop from the East Coast, Leo XIII appointed Conaty as bishop of Monterey-Los Angeles on March 27, 1903. He was installed on June 18, 1903, at the Cathedral of Saint Vibiana in Los Angeles California.

Conaty's 12 years as bishop was a period of explosive growth for the diocese. At the beginning of his tenure in 1903, it contained 101 priests, 121 churches, and 19 parochial schools to serve a Catholic population of 58,000. In his final year as bishop in 1915, there were 260 priests, 266 churches, 40 parochial schools, and 139,480 Catholics.

Conaty established a board of examiners in 1903 to inspect the diocese's schools. He also developed the diocese's first educational plan to provide Catholic schooling from kindergarten through college. To accommodate the growing Catholic population and replace St. Vibiana's Cathedral, Conaty purchased property in Los Angeles for a new cathedral. However an economic downturn in 1907 forced an end to the project.

== Death ==
Two weeks before his death, Conaty went to Coronado, California, hoping to improve his failing health. While there, he was visited by former US President William Howard Taft. Conaty died in Coronado on September 18, 1915, at age 68.

== Sources ==
- Hogan, Peter Edward (1949). The Catholic University of America, 1896-1903: The Rectorship of Thomas J. Conaty. Washington, D.C.: Catholic University of America Press.

Catholic Church titles
Preceded by George Thomas Montgomery	Bishop of Monterey-Los Angeles; 1903–1915	Succeeded by John Joseph Cantwell
Academic offices
Preceded by John Joseph Keane	Rector of The Catholic University of America; 1896–1903	Succeeded by Denis J. O'Connell
