= Vibiana =

Third-century saint

Saint Vibiana
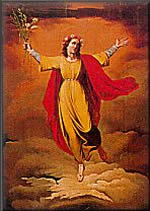
- Painting from Mission Santa Inés

Virgin and martyr
- Born: 3rd century
- Died: 3rd century
- Venerated in: Roman Catholic Church
- Major shrine: Cathedral of Our Lady of the Angels
- Feast: September 1
- Patronage: Los Angeles, California

Vibiana is a third-century virgin martyr and saint of the Roman Catholic Church. She is a co-patroness of the Archdiocese of Los Angeles, along with Patrick and Emydius. Our Lady of the Angels is the principal patroness. Vibiana's liturgical feast day is 1 September, which begins four days of "celebration" through the 4th and the birthday of the City of Angels.

The remains of Vibiana were rediscovered on December 9, 1853, in ancient catacombs near the Appian Way. A marble tablet adorned her tomb upon which was inscribed "to the soul of the innocent and pure Vibiana", above a laurel wreath. A wreath was a symbol of martyrdom in Early Christianity.

Since 2002, the relics of Vibiana have been housed in the mausoleum of the Cathedral of Our Lady of the Angels. The former Cathedral of Saint Vibiana in Los Angeles, California was dedicated to her.

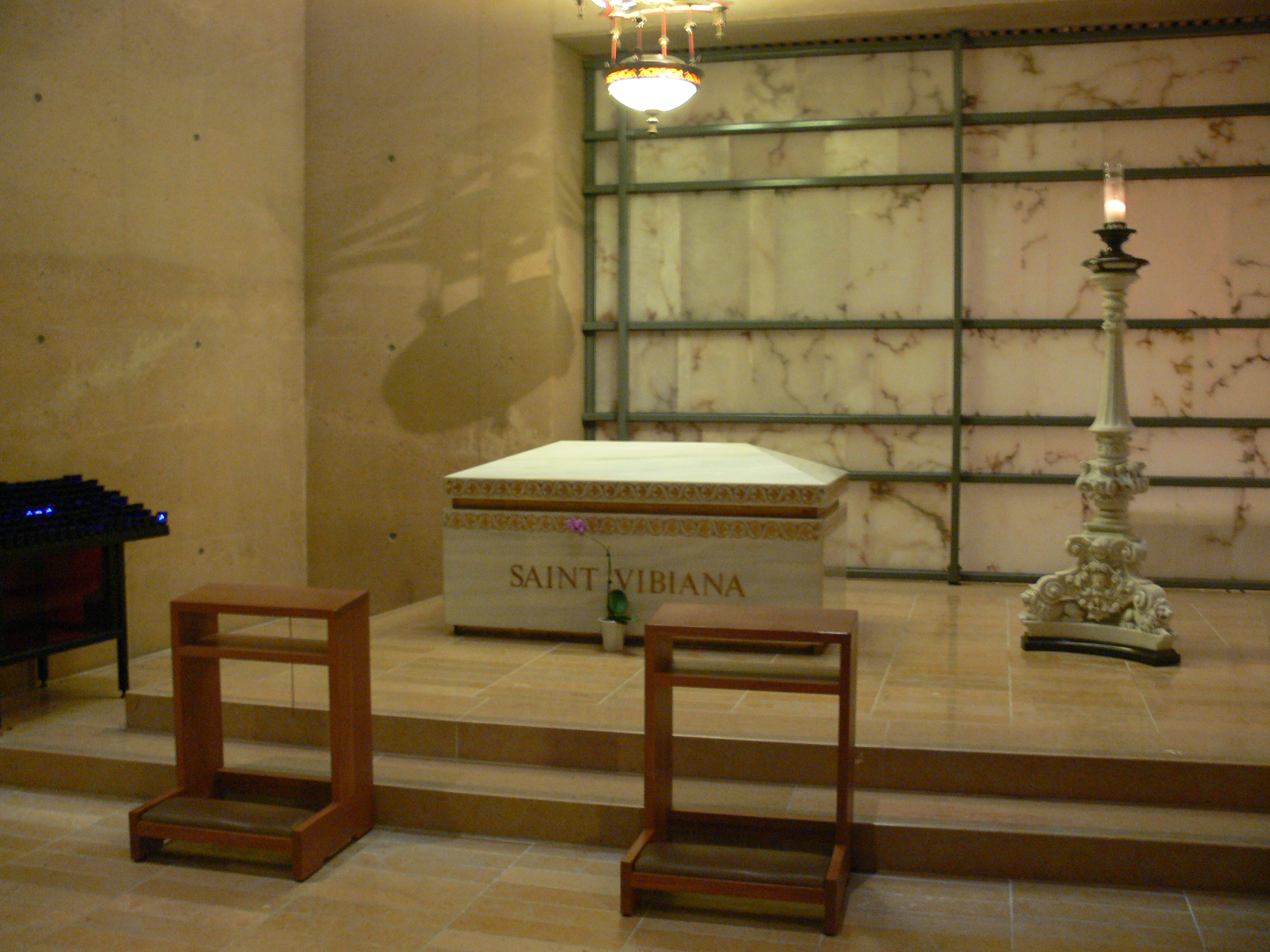
Relics of Saint Vibiana at the Cathedral of Our Lady of the Angels, Los Angeles
