= Joaquim Masmitjà =

Spanish Catholic priest and educator (1808–1886)

Joaquim Masmitjà i de Puig
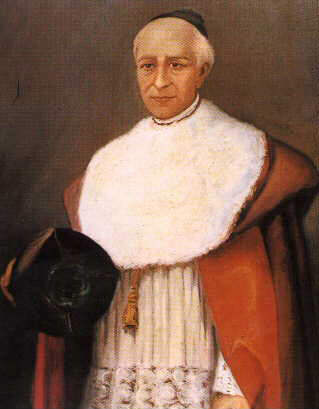

Orders
- Ordination: 22 February 1834

Personal details
- Born: December 29, 1808 Olot, Catalonia, Spain
- Died: August 26, 1886 (aged 77) Girona, Catalonia, Spain

Joaquim Masmitjà i de Puig (Catalan: [ʒuəˈkim məzmiˈdʒa i ðə ˈputʃ]; December 29, 1808 – August 26, 1886), sometimes given with the Castilianized spelling Joaquin Masmitja, was the founder of the Daughters of the Most Holy and Immaculate Heart of the Blessed Virgin Mary in 1848. This was a Catholic religious teaching institute for women, later renamed Sisters of the Immaculate Heart of Mary.

Joaquim Masmitjà was the fourth child of Francesc and Maria Gracia. He entered the minor seminary for the Diocese of Girona and then went on to get degrees in canon and civil law. Masmitjà, who was greatly devoted to the Blessed Virgin under the titles of the Immaculate Heart of Mary and the Sorrowful Mother, was ordained a priest on February 22, 1834.

Assigned to his hometown parish, Masmitjà became increasingly concerned over the poor education of young girls. He sought to rebuild society through their education in prayer and Christian doctrine. On July 1, 1848, Masmitjà founded the Institute of the Daughters of the Immaculate Heart of Mary.

In 1869, Masmitjà’s friend Bishop Thaddeus Amat y Brusi of Monterey, California, was visiting Spain, and asked for some of the sisters to come to California. Two years later, with Father Masmitjà's approval, Mother Raimunda led nine others to the new California mission. The Sisters established two houses, one in Gilroy and the other in San Juan. Very soon the Sisters of the Immaculate Heart were teaching in several schools in different parts of California. Their lifestyle attracted young women to follow the charisma of Fr. Masmitjà, and the Sisters inaugurated a third house in San Luis Obispo (1876), a fourth house in San Bernardino (1880), and finally the last house during the lifetime of Fr. Masmitjà was established in Los Angeles (1886).

Masmitjà died at the age of 78, on August 26, 1886.
