= Francisco Mora y Borrell =

Spanish-born prelate

- Bishop Emeritus of Monterey-Los Angeles
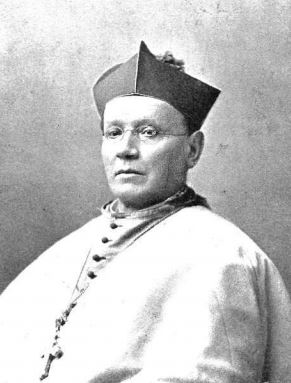
- Church: Catholic Church
- Diocese: Diocese of Monterey-Los Angeles
- Appointed: May 12, 1878
- Term ended: March 13, 1896
- Predecessor: Thaddeus Amat y Brusi
- Successor: George Thomas Montgomery
- Other posts: Titular Archbishop of Hierapolis in Syria (1896-1905); Coadjutor Bishop of Monterey-Los Angeles (1873-1878); Titular Bishop of Mosynopolis (1873-1878)

Orders
- Ordination: March 19, 1856 by Thaddeus Amat y Brusi
- Consecration: August 3, 1873 by Thaddeus Amat y Brusi

Personal details
- Born: November 25, 1827 Gurb, Catalonia, Spain
- Died: August 3, 1905 (aged 77) Barcelona, Catalonia, Spain

Francisco Mora y Borrell (November 25, 1827 – August 3, 1905) was a Spanish-born prelate of the Catholic Church. He was the third Bishop of Monterey-Los Angeles, serving from 1878 to 1896.

== Biography ==
=== Early life ===
Mora was born on November 25, 1827, in the Catalonian village of Gurb to Miguel Mora and Rosa Borrell. He received his early education at the parochial school of Sant Andreu de Gurb before being placed at Casa de Caridad, a school for orphans in Vic. He began his studies for the priesthood at the diocesan seminary in Vic, but when Bishop Thaddeus Amat y Brusi appealed for missionaries in California, Mora offered his services. He came to the United States in 1855 and completed his theological studies at St. Mary's Seminary in Perryville, Missouri.

=== Priesthood ===
Mora was ordained a priest by Bishop Amat on March 19, 1856, in Santa Barbara. His first assignment was to the Church of San Carlos Borromeo in Monterey. He then served at missions in San Juan Bautista, San Luis Obispo, and Pajaro. In February 1863 he was transferred to Los Angeles to serve as rector of the Church of Our Lady of the Angels, where he remained for 15 years. In addition to his pastoral duties, he was named vicar general of the diocese in July 1866.

=== Bishop ===
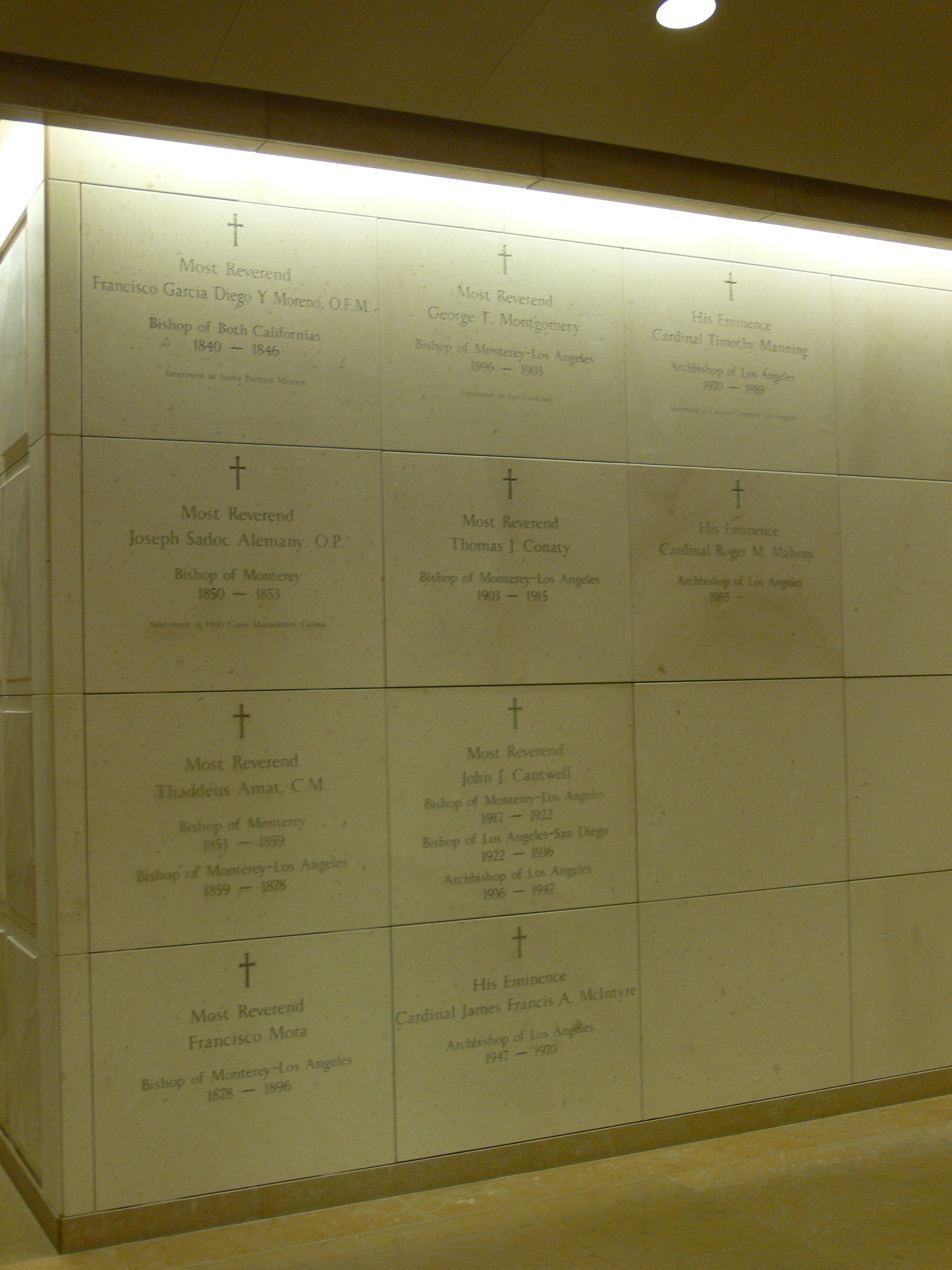
Resting spot at the Los Angeles Cathedral

On May 20, 1873, Mora was appointed coadjutor bishop to Bishop Amat and titular bishop of Mosynopolis by Pope Pius IX. He received his episcopal consecration on the following August 3 from Amat, with Archbishop Joseph Sadoc Alemany and Bishop Eugene O'Connell serving as co-consecrators, at Our Lady of the Angels. When Amat died on May 12, 1878, Mora automatically succeeded him and became the third Bishop of Monterey-Los Angeles.

He served for the next 18 years, during which time he worked to put the Catholic Church on a firm footing in southern California. In 1895 he established The Catholic Tidings, the first Catholic newspaper in Los Angeles. However, by 1890, the Congregation for the Propagation of the Faith became frustrated with the lack of parochial schools in the diocese; Mora argued that most parishes were too poor to afford a school. As a result, the Congregation removed financial control of the diocese from Mora, forbidding him to sell any property or incur any new debts without Rome's permission. Mora believed these harsh restrictions were due to the influence of California's English-speaking bishops.

After sustaining injuries in a carriage accident, he was given a coadjutor bishop, George Thomas Montgomery, who was consecrated in April 1894. Mora resigned his office on March 13, 1896, and was given the honorary title of Titular Archbishop of Hierapolis in Syria. Mora returned to Spain, taking residence in the Sarrià neighborhood of Barcelona. He died there on August 3, 1905, the thirty-second anniversary of his episcopal consecration. He was buried in Sarrià but in 1962 his remains were moved to Los Angeles and buried at the cathedral.

Catholic Church titles
Preceded by Thaddeus Amat y Brusi, C.M.	Bishop of Monterey-Los Angeles; 1878–1896	Succeeded by George Thomas Montgomery
