= Zachariah Montgomery =

American journalist (1825–1900)

Zachariah Montgomery (March 6, 1825 in Nelson County, Kentucky – September 3, 1900 in Los Angeles, California) was a publisher, lawyer, politician, and author, particularly known for his skills as an orator.

Montgomery's speeches were often published in newspapers of the day and in pamphlet form. Although his widely published and forceful critiques of the compulsory public education system were never embraced by the public at large, his book Poison Drops in the Federal Senate (1886) is considered by some contemporary writers as a landmark study of the relevant issues. This work continues to elicit discussion amongst home school organizations, teachers' associations, political scientists, and politicians. He was a proponent of the voucher system for the funding and maintenance of primary and secondary schools.

Montgomery received his Bachelor of Arts (1847), and Master of Arts in Law (1848) from St. Joseph's College (now part of the complex that contains the Basilica of St. Joseph Proto-Cathedral and Spalding Hall) in Bardstown, Kentucky. While at St. Joseph's, he befriended fellow student Augustus Hill Garland and studied for the bar exam in the offices of Benjamin Hardin Helm (1784–1852), a noted lawyer, statesman, member of the Kentucky Legislature and U.S. Congress. Montgomery was admitted to the bar in Kentucky in 1850.

In July 1850, Montgomery immigrated to California via covered wagon in response to the California Gold Rush. Following a very brief and unsuccessful stint as miner, he returned to the practice of law.

== Legal career ==
Montgomery held law partnerships in several California cities including: Sacramento (1850–1852), Yuba City (1854–1864), San Francisco (1868–1871), Oakland (1871–1881), San Diego (1884–1885 and 1890–1894) and Los Angeles (1894–1900). He served as District Attorney for Sutter County in northern California (1856, 1858–1860).

Montgomery was the founding President of the Oakland Bar Association (1877), and served as United States Assistant Attorney General in first Administration of President Grover Cleveland (1885–1889).

=== Notable activities as a lawyer ===
- Montgomery witnessed the Squatters' Riot in Sacramento on August 15, 1850, and served as Charles L. Robinson's attorney in the case. Robinson later served in the California legislature and as the first Governor of Kansas.
- Montgomery was a staunch and vocal opponent of the Lincoln administration throughout the Civil War, he surrendered his license to practice law in late 1863 in protest to the California Legislature's Test Oath. In 1868, the Test Oath was repealed and Montgomery resumed his law practice.
- Montgomery served in the precedent-setting court case at the United States Supreme Court: Cunningham v. Neagle, U.S. 1 (1890). The case involved the shooting of David S. Terry by Justice Stephen Johnson Field's body guard, U.S. Marshal David Neagle . David S. Terry was involved in a dispute with William Sharon that Justice Field adjudicated.

== Political career ==
While in California, Montgomery served the public in numerous capacities as an elected official. He was a Representative of the California State Legislature 15th District (12th session; 1860–1861) and served on the Judiciary and Indian Affairs Committees. Montgomery was a delegate to the State Democratic Convention (John C. Breckinridge Party on Democratic ticket; 1860) and was nominated for Speaker of the House (California State Assembly) but lost this election. Notably, he authored California State Assembly Bill AB 348, The Montgomery Bill – an education reform bill to amend the California School Law Act of May 3, 1855.

On February 11, 1861, Montgomery delivered the State of The State speech to the California State Assembly. He was petitioned by colleagues to become a United States senator (1867) but declined due to political ideological differences with the Lincoln Administration.

In the summer of 1884 Montgomery mounted an unsuccessful bid for the office of District Attorney of San Diego County.

== Marriages ==
On July 4, 1854, Montgomery married Helen Francis Graham (December 20, 1835 – July 18, 1856) who died some months after giving birth to their son Thomas (1855 – 1861).

On April 28, 1857, he married Eleanor Bridget Evoy (1828–1923). They had six children including famed aviation pioneer John Joseph Montgomery (1858–1911), Zachariah Montgomery Jr. (1858–1861), Mary 1859–1948, twins Ellen (1861–1864) and Margaret (1861–1931), Richard (1863–1932), James (1865–1956) and Jane (1869–1955).

== Notable activities as a publisher ==
- When the news of President Abraham Lincoln's death reached San Francisco, April 15, 1865, the offices and printing press for the Occidental were destroyed by an angry mob that targeted newspapers sympathetic to the southern cause.

== Benefactor ==
Montgomery was benefactor of Reverend Lawrence Serda, the founding pastor of Sacred Heart Parish in Oakland. Father Serda said Mass from January 16 to December 10, 1876, in the parlor of the Montgomery home at the northwest corner of Telegraph Avenue and 41st Street. The Montgomery sons were altar boys. Montgomery and J.H. McCourtney donated the land at 40th and Grove Streets where Sacred Heart Church was built in 1876.

== Tributes ==
- Montgomery Creek, Shasta County, California, is named in honor of Montgomery. The town was established in 1877.

== Publications ==
Newspapers/serials

- 1864-1865 The Occidental (San Francisco)
- 1866-1868 Occidental and Vanguard (San Francisco)
- 1881-1884 The Family's Defender Magazine and Educational Review (1881 - Oakland; 1882-1884 - San Diego)
  - Available online: Family's defender magazine and educational review, Volumes 1-2 (Google Books)

Books

- Montgomery, Zachariah. The Poison Fountain or Anti-Parental Education, self-published, San Francisco, 1878.
- Montgomery, Zachariah. Poison Drops In the Federal Senate 3rd edition, Gibson Bros., Washington D.C., 1886. (republished 1972, 1883; St. Thomas Press).

== See also ==
Relatives

- John J. Montgomery, Aviation pioneer
- Bishop George Thomas Montgomery

Subjects Montgomery wrote about

- John Swett, a founder of American public education.

Other

- Richard Grant White, critic of public schools who referred to Montgomery's work.
