= Barbara Maix =

Austrian religious sister

Blessed Barbara Maix ICM
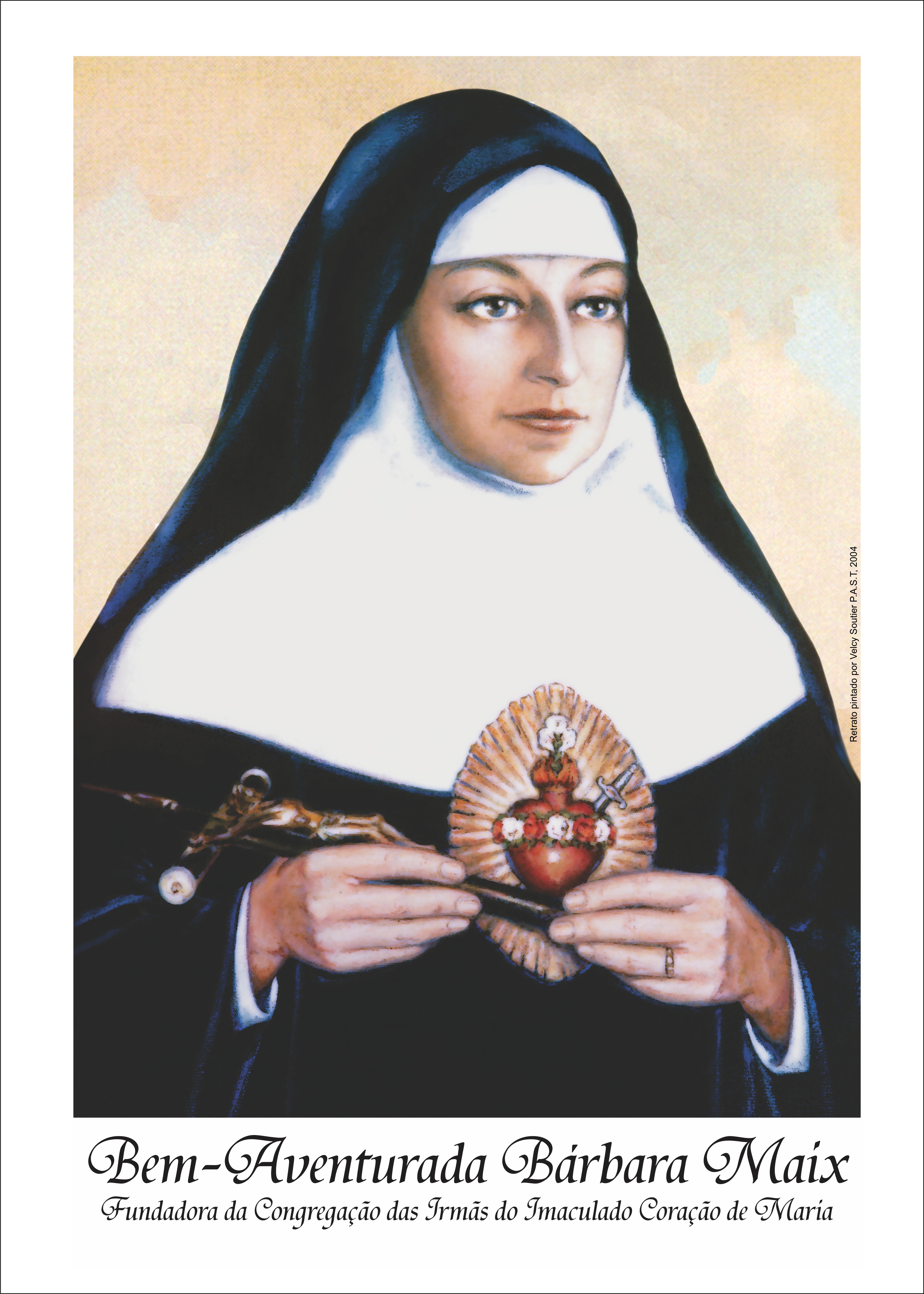
- Blessed Barbara Maix, foundress of the congregation of the Sisters of the Immaculate Heart of Mary

Virgin
- Born: 27 June 1818; Vienna, Austrian Empire
- Died: 17 March 1873 (aged 54); Catumbi, Rio de Janeiro, Brazil
- Venerated in: Roman Catholic Church
- Beatified: 6 November 2010, Ginásio Gigantinho, Porto Alegre, Brazil by Archbishop Lorenzo Baldisseri
- Feast: 17 March

Barbara Maix, ICM, religious name religious name Maria Barbara of the Most Holy Trinity, (27 June 1818 – 17 March 1873) was an Austrian Catholic religious sister who established the Sisters of the Immaculate Heart of Mary in Brazil. Maix dedicated her life and service to the adequate treatment of the poor and ill with an added emphasis on the recognition of female dignities.

Maix's death in 1873 prompted calls for her beatification which commenced in 1993 and culminated in her beatification that was celebrated on 6 November 2010 in Brazil where she worked. Archbishop Lorenzo Baldisseri presided over the celebration on the behalf of Pope Benedict XVI.

== Life ==
Barbara Maix was born in Vienna on 27 June 1818 to Joseph Maix and Rosalia Mauritz; one of her sisters was Maria. Several siblings died in their childhood which left four other sisters and Maix. Her father served as a chamberlain to Archduke Franz Karl of Austria in the Schönbrunn Palace. In her childhood - even further into adulthood - she suffered from a series of heart ailments in addition to asthma. In her adolescence she worked as a kitchen hand and as a maid at the Schönbrunn Palace in the capital. It was around this time at the age of fifteen that both her parents died.

At the age of 18 she and her sister Maria left the place the pair resided in and opened a home for those who needed assistance which included the poor population of Vienna. It was at this time she wrote a rule of life that sought to promote the dignities of females and it was this that inspired her to establish a Marian order for women to that effect.

Maix established her new Marian order in Vienna in 1843 but desired the blessing of the Supreme Pontiff for his formal approval. She travelled to Rome for a scheduled audience with Pope Gregory XVI but the pontiff died on 1 June 1846 - a day before the two were to meet. Maix did not remain in Rome following this and nor did she attempt to have an audience with the new Pope Pius IX. During the Revolutions of 1848 she and her 21 companions were expelled from the state and made the decision to establish their order in North America. However, as the group awaited their ship in Hamburg Maix made the sudden decision to go to Brazil. She and her companions arrived in Rio de Janeiro on 9 November 1848 and founded their Mother-House at Porto Alegre on 8 May 1849.

At the request of the Bishop of Rio de Janeiro Manoel de Monte Rodrigues de Araujo she entered the Conceptionist Sisters for six months before leaving. She prepared for her vows and religious vesting alongside 22 others on 8 May 1849 and assumed a new religious name; this marked the formal establishment of her order in Brazil. The congregation welcomed the poor and the ill as well as women and abandoned people. On 31 December 1870 she departed for Rio de Janeiro from Porto Alegre to assist at a school for orphan girls.

Maix fell ill following Mass on 7 March 1873. She died on 17 March 1873 in her armchair with a slight smile on her face. Her remains were relocated in 1957 and are now at the Chapel of São Raphael in Porto Alegre. Her institute now operates across South America in places like Bolivia and expanded in other places like Haiti and Italy.

== Beatification ==
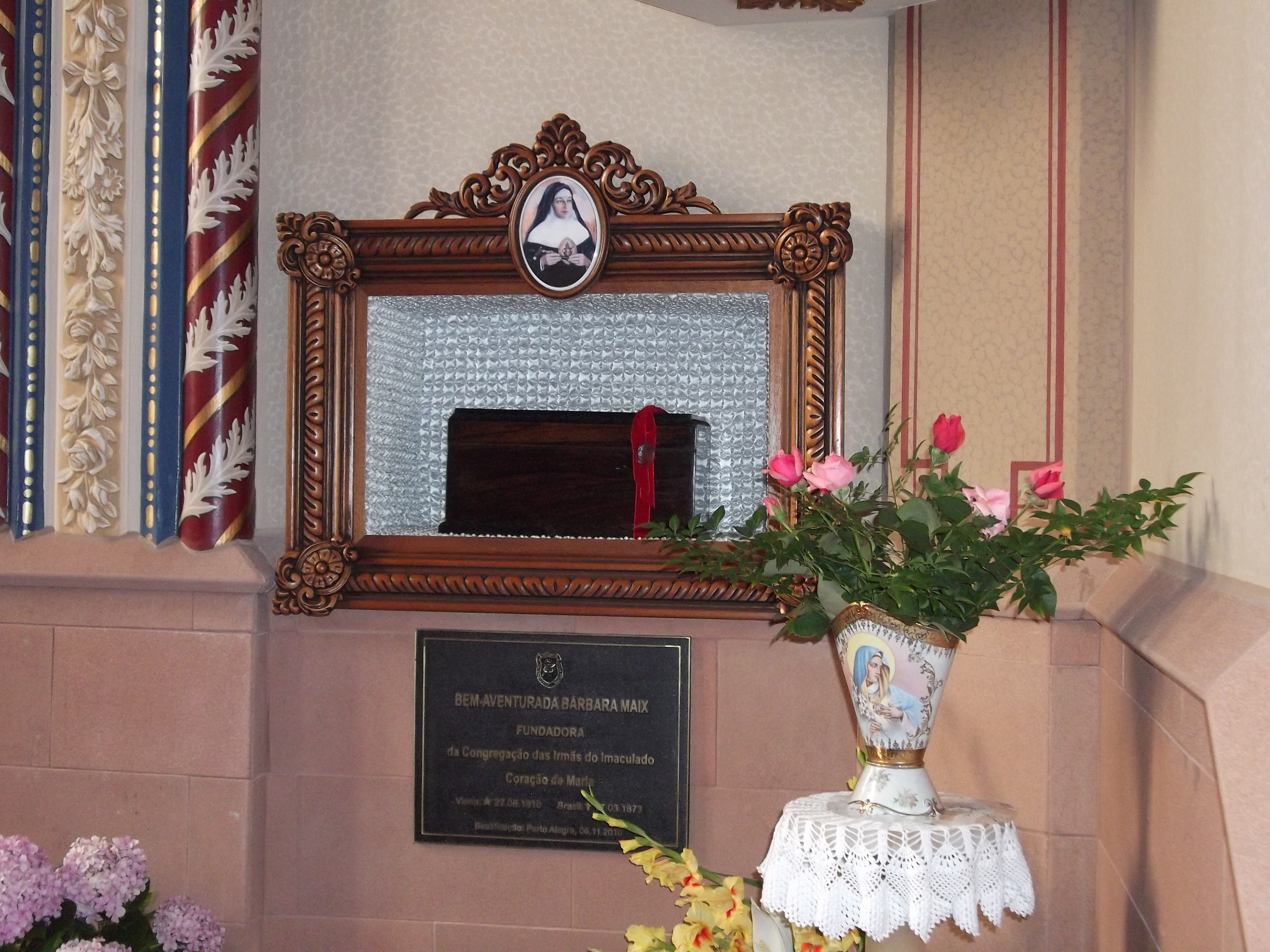
Relics of Barbara Maix at São Rafael Church in Porto Alegre, Rio Grande do Sul

The beatification process commenced after the transfer of the competent forum that would undertake the cause from Rio de Janeiro to Porto Alegre on 15 May 1992. Following this the Congregation for the Causes of Saints issued the official "nihil obstat" (nothing against) to the cause on 2 February 1993 under Pope John Paul II and proclaimed her to be a Servant of God.

The diocesan process spanned from 19 June 1993 and concluded its work on 29 November 1996. It was ratified on 24 April 1998 and allowed for the postulation to compile the Positio and submit it to the C.C.S. in 2003 for their own assessment. Historians were called to assess the cause and determine if it could proceed without historical obstacles and approved the cause to continue to the next stage on 29 April 2003. Theologians approved the cause on 19 October 2007 and the C.C.S. followed suit on 1 April 2008.

Maix was declared to be Venerable on 3 July 2008 after Pope Benedict XVI confirmed that she had lived a model Christian life of heroic virtue.

The miracle required for her beatification was investigated in the diocese of its origin and was ratified as a valid process on 6 October 2000. The Rome-based medical board approved it on 13 November 2008 while consulting theologians cleared it on 22 April 2009. The C.C.S. gave their approval on 12 January 2010 before passing it onto the pope for his own papal approval on 27 March 2010.

Lorenzo Baldisseri presided over the beatification on 6 November 2010 in Porto Alegre on the behalf of Benedict XVI.

The current postulator assigned to the cause is Gentila Richetti.
