= Thaddeus Amat y Brusi =

Spanish Roman Catholic cleric

The Right Reverend Thaddeus Amat y Brusi CM
- Bishop of Monterey-Los Angeles
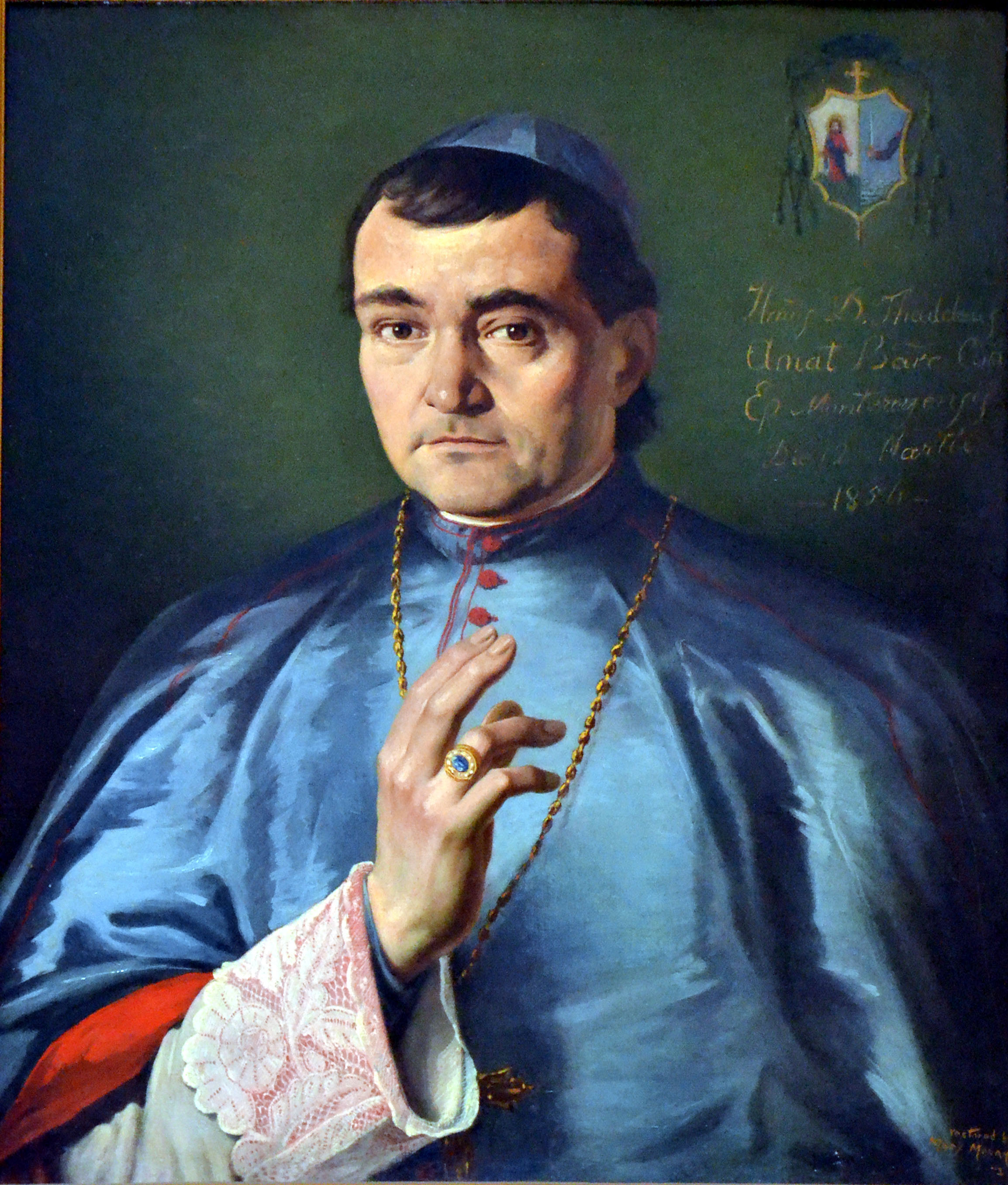
- Portrait of Bishop Thaddeus Amat at the San Fernando Mission in California
- Native name: Tadeu Amat i Brusi
- Province: San Francisco
- Diocese: Monterey-Los Angeles

Orders
- Ordination: December 23, 1837 by Hyacinthe-Louis de Quélen
- Consecration: March 12, 1854 by Giacomo Filippo Fransoni

Personal details
- Born: December 31, 1810 Barcelona, Spain
- Died: May 12, 1878 (aged 67) Los Angeles, California, United States
- Buried: Cathedral of Our Lady of the Angels, Los Angeles, California, United States

Styles of Thaddeus Amat
- Reference style: The Right Reverend
- Spoken style: Your Excellency
- Religious style: His Excellency
- Posthumous style: none

Thaddeus Amat y Brusi CM (Spanish: Tadeu; Catalan: Tadeu Amat i Brusi; December 31, 1811 – May 12, 1878) was a Spanish Catholic prelate who served as the first Bishop of Monterey–Los Angeles. He was a member of the Vincentians.

== Early life ==
Amat was born in Barcelona, Catalonia, Spain on December 31, 1810, to Pedro Amat and Maria Brusi. After earlier studies, he entered the Congregation of the Mission, commonly called the Vincentian Fathers, in 1832. He was ordained a priest of the Congregation on December 23, 1837, in Paris, France, by Hyacinthe-Louis de Quélen, the Archbishop of Paris.

He was sent to the United States as a missionary in Louisiana. He later served as a master of novices for his congregations in Missouri and Pennsylvania.

== Bishop ==
On 28 July 1853, while serving as the Rector of St. Charles Borromeo Seminary in Philadelphia, he was appointed the Bishop of Monterey in California. The diocese's previous bishop, Joseph Sadoc Alemany, O.P., had been promoted to archbishop of the newly created Archdiocese of San Francisco.

Father Amat's signature, 1869

Amat was consecrated as a bishop in Rome on March 12, 1854, by Cardinal Fransoni, the Prefect of the Sacred Congregation for the Propagation of the Faith. Recognizing the growth of Los Angeles and the decline of Monterey, he petitioned the Holy See to move the see to Los Angeles and to be known as Bishop of Los Angeles.

Amat arrived in the pueblo of Los Angeles in 1855. On July 7, 1859, the diocese was renamed the Diocese of Monterey-Los Angeles. The Co-Cathedral of Saint Vibiana was founded in Los Angeles and consecrated during the episcopacy of Amat. He brought back from Rome the relics of its patron saint, which were interred in a sarcophagus above the cathedral's main altar.

Father Amat traveled to Rome in 1869 to attend the First Vatican Council called upon by Pope Pius IX. On June 28, 1870, Father Amat was an orator during the official mass of the 78th Congregation celebrated in the Vatican.

The Council was interrupted when King Victor Emmanuel II attacked Rome and deposed Pope Pius IX. Pius IX suspended the Council indefinitely on October 20, 1870.

=== Dispute over the California missions ===
Amat came into conflict with Friar José González Rubio, O.F.M., of the Mission Santa Barbara, over the control of the mission after President Abraham Lincoln returned the California missions to the Catholic Church. The Franciscans claimed, on the basis of both Church law and historical grounds, that the missions were rightfully under their direct jurisdiction and not that of the diocese. Accordingly they claimed that they should hold the deed to Mission Santa Barbara.

=== Institutions founded ===
Amat founded some of the first schools in Los Angeles and asked his fellow Vincentians to open St. Vincent's College (now known as Loyola Marymount University). It was the first institution of higher learning in Southern California. He welcomed the Franciscan Brothers of Ireland into his diocese to work in the parochial schools, as well as the Daughters of Charity and the Sisters of the Immaculate Heart of Mary.

Amat formally consecrated Calvary Cemetery on North Broadway (formerly Buena Vista Street) at Bishops Road in 1866. The area had been set aside in 1844. The graves in Calvary Cemetery were moved to the present cemetery location to make way for Cathedral High School. He founded the 30-acre Santa Clara Cemetery (34°13′51″N 119°11′4″W) in Oxnard in 1874. St. Mary's Cemetery (3.69 acres) (34°16′53″N 119°16′51″W) in San Buenaventura was acquired by Amat in 1862 and blessed in 1884. He dedicated the Gothic Revival brick chapel to Saint Nicholas at the Workman Family Cemetery in the City of Industry.

== Death ==
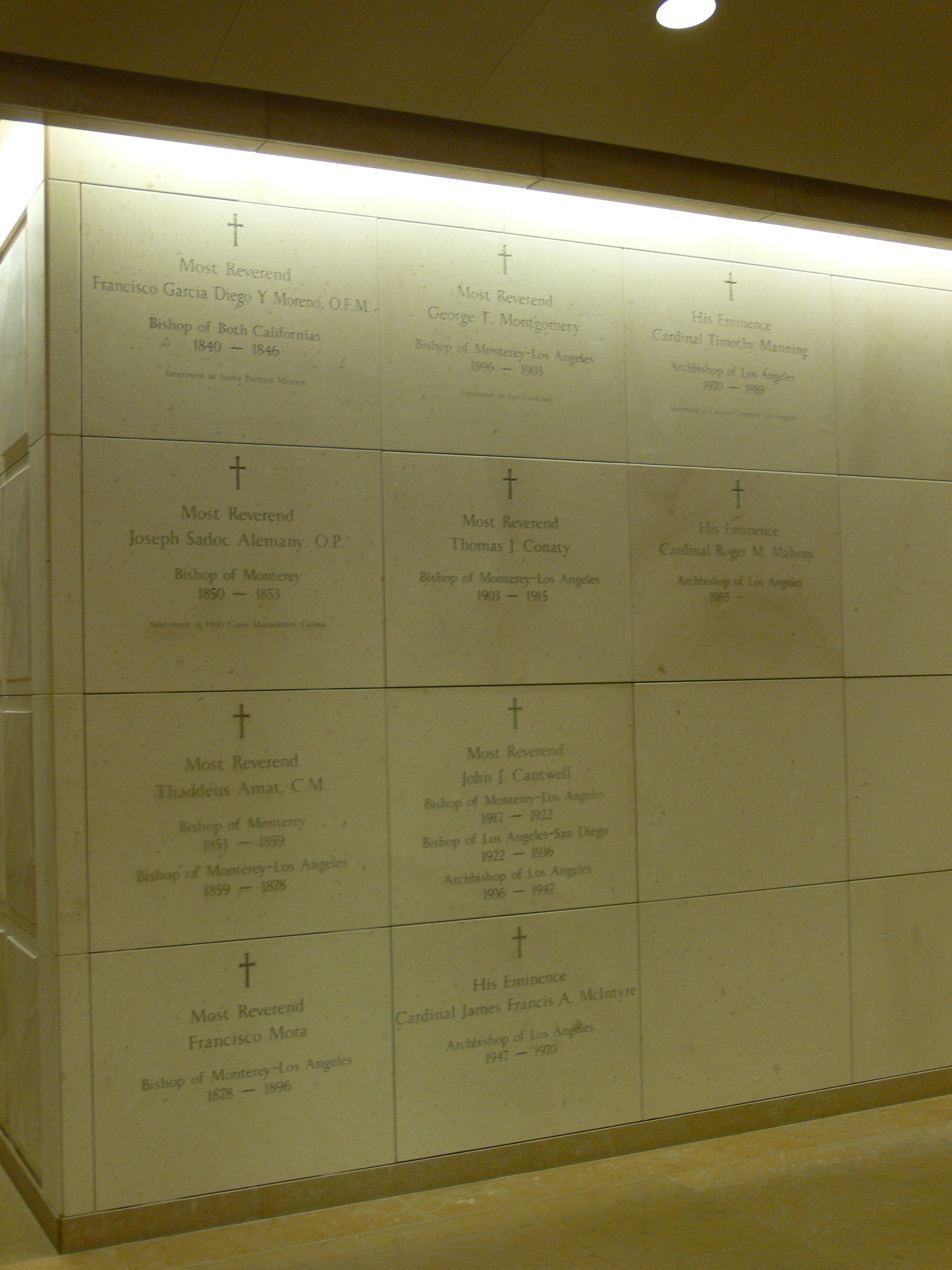
Resting spot at the Los Angeles Cathedral

Amat died on May 12, 1878, at Los Angeles, California, and was succeeded by his coadjutor bishop, Francisco Mora y Borrell, who (like Alemany and Amat) was also Catalan. He was originally buried in the crypt of the co-cathedral in Los Angeles, but, due to earthquake damage, is now buried in the bishop's crypt of the Cathedral of Our Lady of the Angels, which replaced it in 2002.

Bishop Amat Memorial High School in La Puente, California, is named for him and his original tombstone is located at the school's chapel.

Catholic Church titles
Preceded by Joseph Sadoc Alemany, O.P.	Bishop of Monterey; 1853–1859	Succeeded by See of Monterey-Los Angeles
Preceded by See of Monterey	Bishop of Monterey-Los Angeles; 1859–1878	Succeeded by Francisco Mora y Borrell
