= Sisters of the Immaculate Heart of Mary =

Catholic teaching institute for women in Spain

- Established: 1848; 178 years ago
- Founder: Fr. Joaquim Masmitjà i de Puig
- Founded at: Olot, Catalonia, Spain, Colwich, Kansas
- Type: Centralized Religious Institute of Consecrated Life of Pontifical Right (for Women)
- Purpose: Educational work
- Headquarters: General motherhouse Colwich, Kansas
- Mother General: Mother Cecelia Marie IHM
- Post nominal initials: IHM
- Affiliations: Roman Catholic
- Website: https://www.sistersihmofwichita.org
- Formerly called: Daughters of the Most Holy and Immaculate Heart of the Blessed Virgin Mary

The Sisters of the Immaculate Heart of Mary (IHM), founded as the Daughters of the Most Holy and Immaculate Heart of the Blessed Virgin Mary, is a Catholic religious teaching institute for women. The institute was founded in the Catalan city of Olot, (Spain) in 1848 by Father Joaquim Masmitjà i de Puig as a means of rebuilding society through the education of young women. A daughter house of the community was founded in Los Angeles, California, United States, in 1871, and in 1924 formally separated from the Spanish congregation and was established as a distinct institute.

== Founding ==
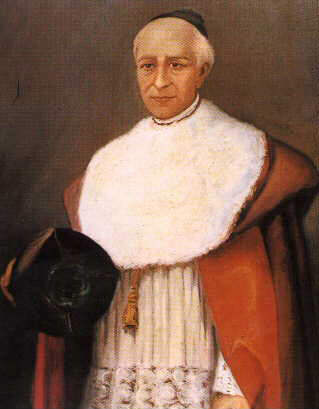
Fr. Joaquin Masmitjá

Joaquim Masmitjà was born in the Catalan city of Olot (Spain) on December 29, 1808, the fourth child of Francesc and Maria Gracia. He entered the minor seminary for the Diocese of Girona and then went on to get degrees in canon and civil law. Masmitjà, who was greatly devoted to the Blessed Virgin under the titles of the Immaculate Heart of Mary and the Sorrowful Mother, was ordained a priest on February 22, 1834.

Assigned to his hometown parish, Fr. Masmitjà became increasingly concerned over the poor education of young girls. He sought to rebuild society through their education in prayer and Christian doctrine. On July 1, 1848, Masmitjà founded the Institute of the Daughters of the Immaculate Heart of Mary.

During the Spanish Civil War IHM sisters Carme (age 41), Rosa (36), and Magdalena (34) Fradera, who were also blood sisters, were executed by the militia. They are among the 498 Martyrs of 20th Century Spain beatified by Pope Benedict XVI in 2007.

== United States ==
=== California ===
In 1869, Fr. Masmitja's friend Bishop Thaddeus Amat y Brusi of Monterey, California, was visiting Spain, and asked for some of the Sisters to come to California. Two years later, with Father Masmitja's approval, Mother Raimunda led nine others to the new California mission. The Sisters established two houses, one in Gilroy and the other in San Juan. Very soon the Sisters of the Immaculate Heart were teaching in several schools in different parts of California. Their lifestyle attracted young women to follow the charisma of Fr. Masmitja, and the Sisters inaugurated a third house in San Luis Obispo (1876), a fourth house in San Bernardino (1880), and finally the last house during the lifetime of Fr. Masmitja was established in Los Angeles (1886).

On January 11, 1886, the IHMs began teaching in the Cathedral School of Los Angeles, directly behind the Cathedral. For several years it served as an elementary school, but under the leadership of Sister Gabriel, IHM, an academy for girls was added, four years of high school. The IHMs taught at the Cathedral School until June 1969, and also ran orphanages.

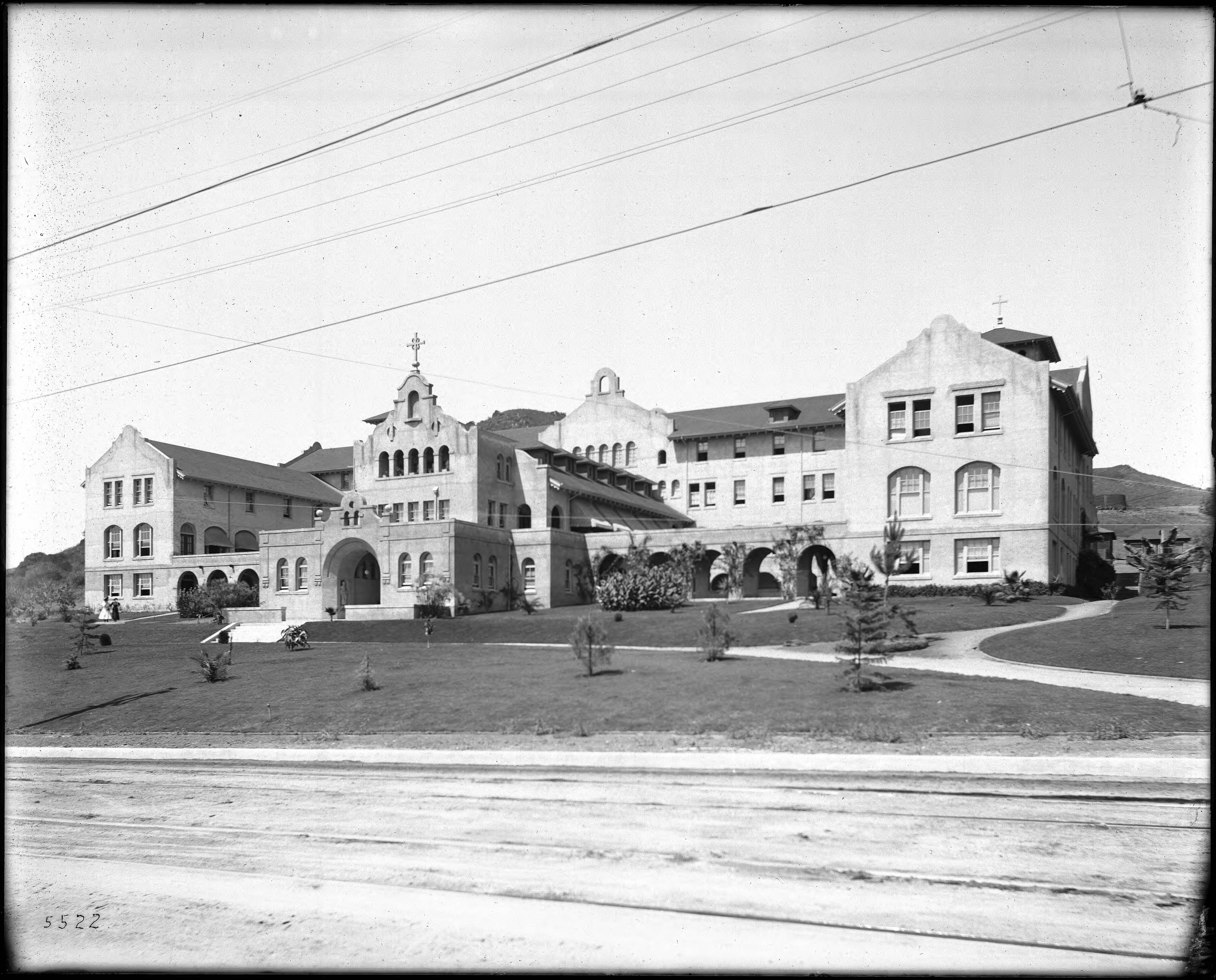
Immaculate Heart Convent and College, later high school

Mother Raimunda served as the provincial of the California sisters until her death in 1900. By 1906 the sisters were able to build their own convent, the Motherhouse. Bishop Francis J. Conaty played an important role in the acquisition of the property and the building of this Motherhouse for the IHMs. In 1916 Immaculate Heart College was established in Los Angeles. Part of the original convent building was razed in 1975 due to fire and safety concerns.

Mother Genevieve Parker was instrumental in securing the separation of the California IHMs from the Spanish community. With the help of Bishop John Joseph Cantwell of Los Angeles, the separation was completed in 1924 and Mother Genevieve was elected the first mother-general.

=== Arizona ===
In 1911, five sisters from Spain and two from California were sent to start a school in Mazatlán, Mexico. Six years later, in 1917, the sisters were forced to leave due to the Mexican Revolution. During a stop in their journey back to California, Bishop Henry Granjon of Tucson, Arizona, invited the sisters to stay and they accepted. From there they began building schools and accepting postulants. The sisters evangelized not just in the schools but, after regular classes, in many missions in small mining towns around Tucson. Due to growth over time, in 1946 the sisters in Arizona became the Province of Saint Joseph. In 1947 the novitiate moved to Sabino Canyon Road, at the foothills of the Santa Catalina Mountains outside Tucson.

The Sisters of the Immaculate Heart of Mary, Tucson, also have a Korean Ministry which allows the Korean Catholic community to use space at St. Ann's Convent, for Liturgy and faith formation. The IHM sisters remain active in both Arizona and Florida. In 2010 the Sisters of the Immaculate Heart of Mary from Miami, started a new mission in La Concordia, Diocese of Jinotega, Nicaragua, Central America.

=== Immaculate Heart Community ===
By the 1960s, there were 600 professed Sisters in 68 elementary schools, 11 high schools, one college, and two hospitals. In the late 1960s, a dispute arose between the institute and Archbishop James Francis McIntyre of Los Angeles. The IHM Sisters took part in a process of renewal led by the psychologist Dr. Carl Rogers, founder of the Center for the Study of the Person, an affiliate of the Western Behavioral Sciences Institute. Carl Rogers and his associates Bruce Meador and Bill Coulson conducted encounter groups according to the principles of the Human Potential Movement. In such encounter groups, under the direction of a facilitator, participants were encouraged to share their real feelings as they interacted with the other group participants.

The first encounter group was held in the summer of 1966 at the Immaculate Heart Novitiate in Montecito, California. With its apparent success, the experiment was begun en masse in 1967, with all the sisters and the schools they ran in the Los Angeles Archdiocese participating. The encounter groups facilitated change in the IHM community. It was among the first groups of women religious to modernize their rule in accord with the directives of Vatican II. Changes included a more democratic form of governance and replacing their religious attire with civilian dress. Cardinal McIntyre refused to let the sisters teach in archdiocese schools unless they wore habits and adhered to a variety of traditional rules. The sisters, in turn, objected to the Archbishop dictating their attire, bedtimes, and hours of prayer.

Then-superior Anita Caspary remained firm in implementing the reforms and on February 1, 1970, about 300 of the IHM Sisters followed Caspary and were subsequently dispensed from their vows and fired from the schools in the archdiocese. They went on to form a non-canonical group that admits both men and women known as the Immaculate Heart Community. The 68 sisters who decided to remain were allowed to keep the Sisters of the Immaculate Heart of Mary as their name. As of 2015 there are five sisters.

An ensuing property settlement left remaining the IHM sisters with certain properties, while those dispensed obtained control of Immaculate Heart College and Immaculate Heart High School in Los Angeles.

The headquarters of the Immaculate Heart Community are at 5515 Franklin Avenue near Western Avenue, in the Los Feliz district of Los Angeles. Immaculate Heart Blythe Street serves the San Fernando Valley, located in Panorama City, Los Angeles. The Immaculate Heart Community has since 1943 run a Center for Spiritual Renewal and La Casa de Maria on 26 acres in Montecito, California. This was also the novitiate for many years. As of 2011 the Immaculate Heart Community numbered 160 members.

=== Wichita ===
After failed attempts to resolve differences among themselves regarding the living of their original charism and the essential elements of religious life, Mother Joanne, a former Treasurer of the Institute, Sister Eileen, and Sister Giovanni were directed by the Holy See to find another diocese that would welcome them and their works. They relocated to the Diocese of Wichita in Kansas. The IHM Sisters of Wichita work primarily in the ministries of education, youth ministry, retreat work, and catechesis.

== Ownership dispute ==
The Convent of the Sisters of the Immaculate Heart of Mary was located in the Los Feliz district of Los Angeles, sharing the former Earle C. Anthony estate with the Cardinal Timothy Manning House of Prayer for Priests. Designed by Bernard Maybeck in 1927, the mansion was remodeled and enlarged in the mid-1990s. Both facilities were closed by the archdiocese in 2011, and the complex was used as a location for the TV series My Name Is Earl, T.J. Hooker and 90210. Disputes of ownership between two of the five remaining Sisters of the Immaculate Heart of Mary and the Archdiocese gained media attention when Katy Perry attempted to purchase the estate in 2015, with plans to restore it to a private mansion. On April 13, 2016, a judge ruled that the property belonged to the Los Angeles Archdiocese, and that the Sisters' planned sale to restaurateur Dana Hollister for $15.5 million was not authorized. On November 17, 2017, a Los Angeles jury awarded over $5 million in legal costs to Katy Perry and the archdiocese, and found that Hollister "acted with malice, oppression or fraud" in the dispute over ownership of the property.

== Educational institutions ==
=== California ===
- Immaculate Heart High School−Los Angeles, established in 1906 in the Los Feliz district, Los Angeles.
- Immaculate Heart College, 1916-1981
- Immaculate Heart Middle School, est. 1975
- St Bernardines School High School, in San Bernardino, California, est. 1938, merged with Aquinas High School in 1971
- Alverno High School, est. 1960

=== Arizona ===
- Immaculate Heart High School−Arizona, est. 1930

=== Pennsylvania ===
- Immaculata University

== Notable sisters ==
- Sister Corita Kent – renowned artist and reform activist
- Sister Ruth Pfau – She moved from Germany to Pakistan and devoted more than 50 years of her life fighting leprosy in Pakistan. She died a national hero in Pakistan and was given a state funeral.

== See also ==
- Spirit of Vatican II
- Post Vatican II history of the Catholic Church
- Congregations of the Heart of Mary
