= Cathedral of Saint Vibiana =

Former Cathedral of the Archdiocese of Los Angeles

Saint Vibiana's Cathedral
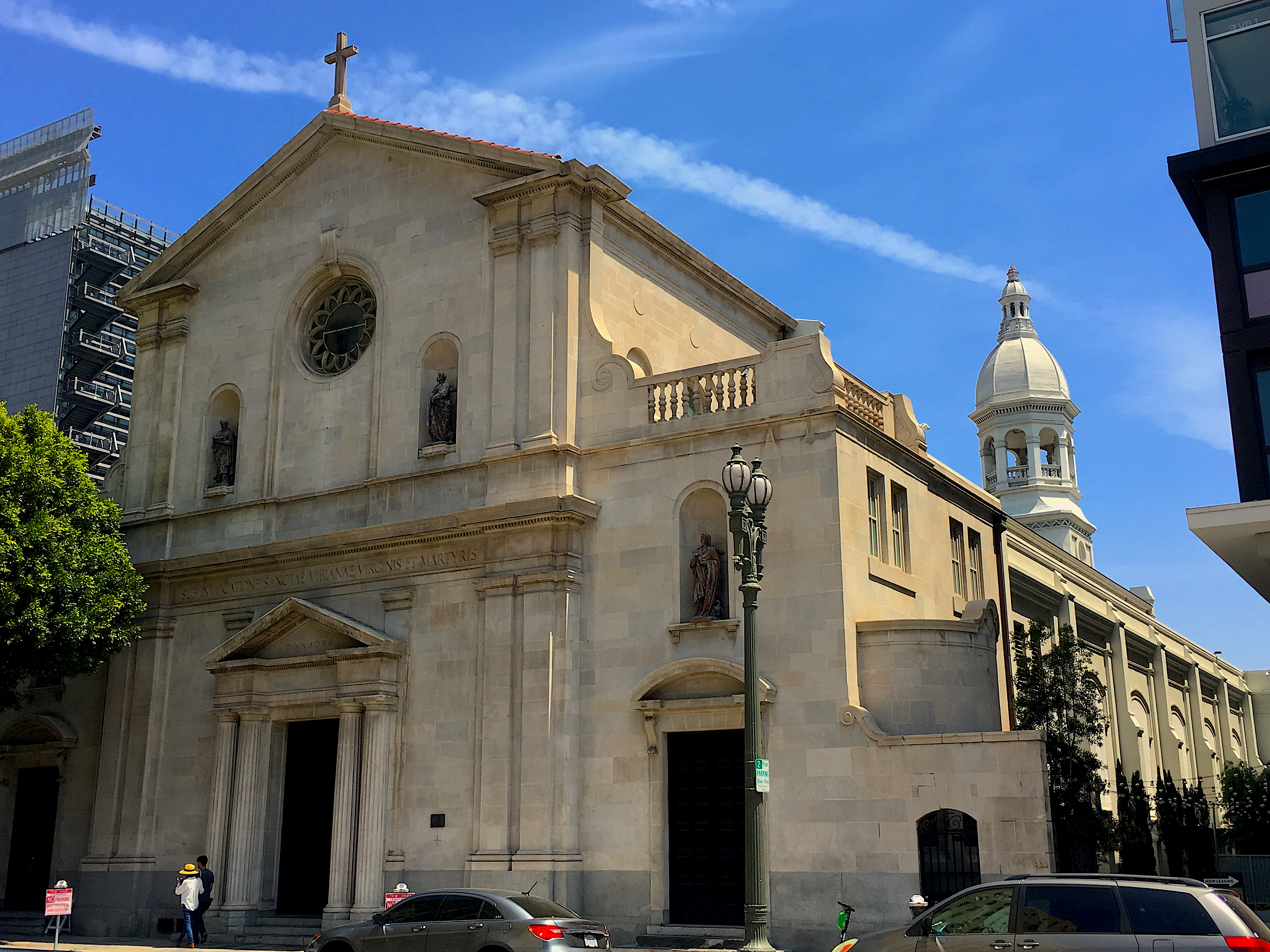

- Location within the Los Angeles metropolitan area Location within California Location within the United States
- 34.0505°N 118.2444°W
- Location: 214 S Main Street; Los Angeles, CA 90012

History
- Built: 1876

Site notes
- Architect: Kysor & Mathews
- Architectural style: Italianate

Los Angeles Historic-Cultural Monument
- Designated: May 10, 1963
- Reference no.: 17

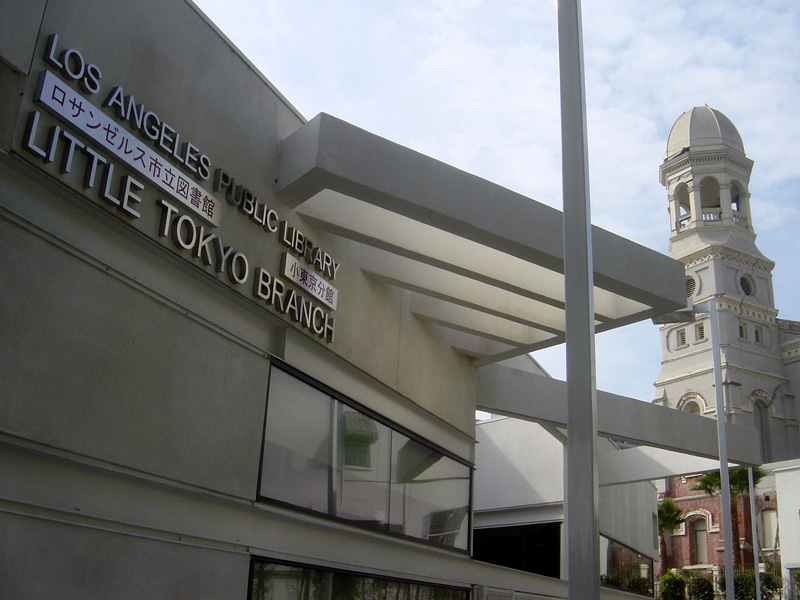
St. Vibiana complex in 2006, before the cupola was returned in 2007

The Cathedral of Saint Vibiana (Spanish: Catedral de Santa Vibiana), often called St. Vibiana's, is the former Catholic cathedral for the Archdiocese of Los Angeles. Located in Downtown Los Angeles, the building opened in 1876 as the cathedral for what was then known as the Diocese of Monterey–Los Angeles, and remained the official cathedral of the Los Angeles see for over 100 years. It is named for Vibiana, a saint who lived in the 3rd century, and is currently a secular events venue.

The cathedral was heavily damaged during the 1994 Northridge earthquake and became the subject of a lengthy legal battle between the archdiocese, which wanted to demolish the building and build a new cathedral on the site, and preservationists, who wanted the building to remain standing due to its historical significance. In 1996, the parties involved reached a compromise in which the archdiocese would purchase a nearby site on which to build a new cathedral, and in turn would turn over the St. Vibiana site to the City of Los Angeles. The Cathedral of Our Lady of the Angels was dedicated in 2002 as the successor to St. Vibiana's.

In the late 2000s, the former cathedral building became an event venue called Vibiana. The Little Tokyo branch of the Los Angeles Public Library is also located on the site. The 1876 cathedral structure is one of the last remaining buildings from the early period of Los Angeles history.

== History ==
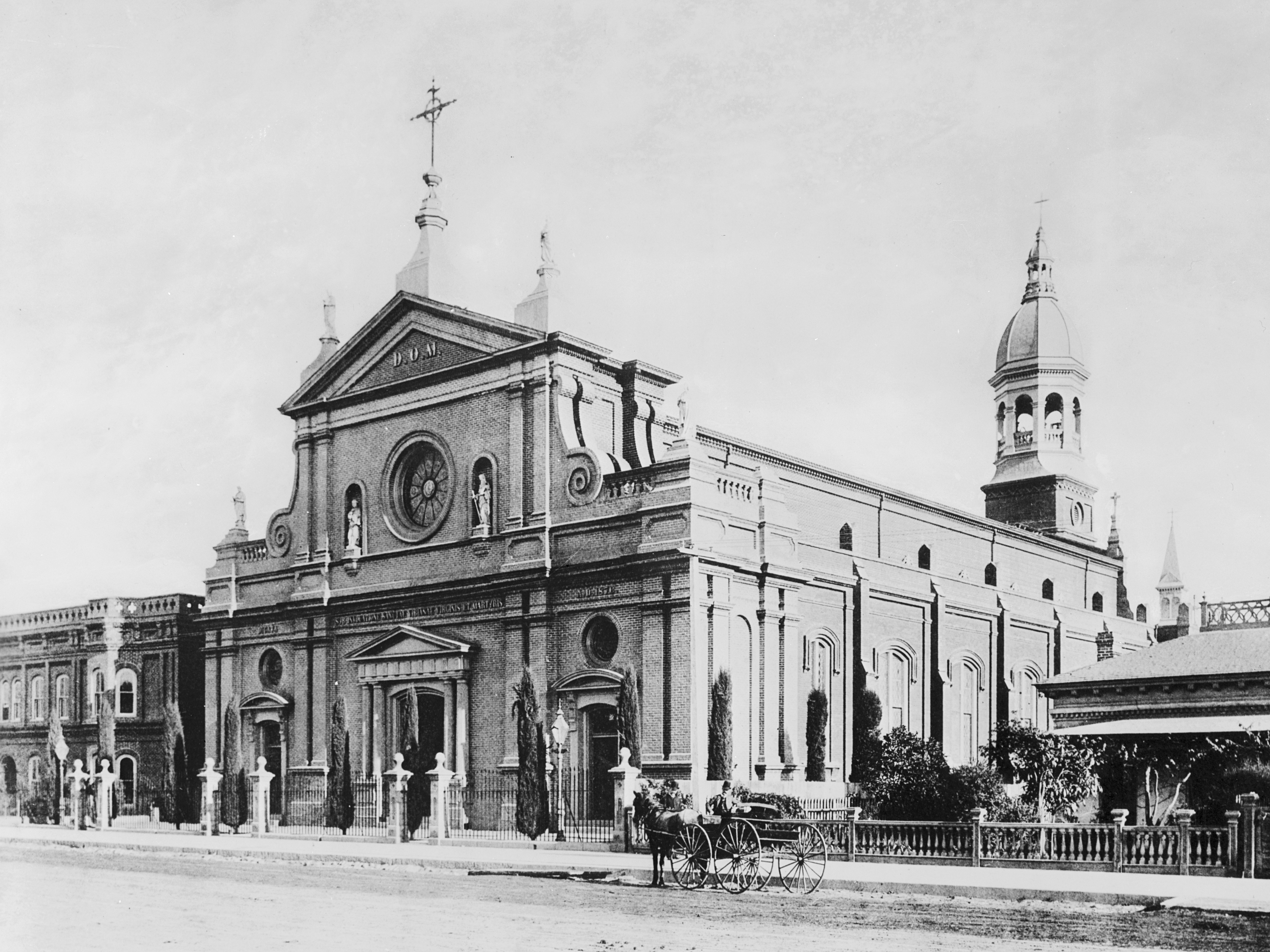
St. Vibiana's in 1885

Plans for a cathedral dated back to 1859, and land for the facility was donated by Amiel Cavalier. The complex, on the southeast corner of Main and Second streets in downtown Los Angeles, was dedicated in 1876 and cost US$80,000 to build. The cathedral's architects, Kysor & Mathews, also designed the landmark Pico House. The Baroque-inspired Italianate structure was a landmark in the early days of Los Angeles. When first opened, it held one-tenth of the young town's population. The interior was remodeled around 1895, using onyx and marble; the exterior facade was changed in 1922–24 to give it a new look, said to be based on a Roman design.

Pope Pius IX chose the cathedral's name, choosing third-century Roman martyr Vibiana. Cathedrals traditionally contained the relics of a saint, so the remains of Vibiana were removed from the Catacombs of Rome and moved to a gilt-and-plate-glass sarcophagus located in a niche above the high altar.

During the 1940s, a rectory and school building were added. The school closed in 1969 because the parish could not afford it. It became a convent for the Disciples of the Divine Master.

The facility was outgrown by the region's rapidly expanding population, and the archdiocese decided that it needed a larger main facility; however, preservationists pressured them not to destroy the historic landmark. The situation was complicated further when the 1994 Northridge earthquake caused extensive damage to the cathedral and its 1,200-seat sanctuary. Deciding that the damage was not worth repairing in such a small structure, the archdiocese began demolition on the site in 1996, without permits. However, the sudden dismantling of the bell tower on a Saturday morning prompted a frantic save-the-cathedral campaign, and work by the archdiocese was halted by preservationists who had a temporary restraining order placed on demolition. The archdiocese argued that it had the right to level its own facility; preservationists and the city wanted the church to be preserved. The structure was listed on the country's "11 Most Endangered Places" by the National Trust for Historic Preservation. A state Court of Appeal rejected the archdiocese's argument to be allowed to quickly demolish the cathedral; then-City Councilwoman Rita Walters had moved to strip the cathedral of its historic monument status, an action that would exempt the archdiocese from having to prepare the full environmental impact study normally required for destruction of a city landmark.

Finally a compromise was reached: the City of Los Angeles agreed to swap land with the archdiocese, giving the Church a much larger plot next to the 101 Freeway. The archdiocese agreed, and the land was developed into the new Cathedral of Our Lady of the Angels, constructed and consecrated as the new mother church cathedral parish of the archdiocese. Some items from St. Vibiana's Cathedral were used in the new cathedral. The stained glass and sarcophagus were placed in the new cathedral's crypt mausoleum. Pipes from the 1980 Austin pipe organ have been incorporated into the organ at the new cathedral. An oratorio about Vibiana was written by Peter Boyd and performed in Pacoima in 1997.

The cathedral site was taken over by the city. The city sold the former cathedral building to downtown developer Tom Gilmore in 1999 for $4.6 million. The non-historic 1940s Education Building was demolished, making way for the new Little Tokyo Branch of the Los Angeles Public Library. The building celebrated the end of its renovation with a gala on November 12, 2005, though plans for its use were still undecided. In August 2007, the 3,500-pound (1,600 kg) cupola was returned to the top of the 83-foot-tall (25 m) bell tower.

The former cathedral was later renamed Vibiana and converted to an event space, including for post-Emmy Award parties in 2009 and 2010, Art of Elysium's annual charity gala, Warner Music Group's post-Grammy Awards party, and the Alfred E. Mann Foundation Gala.

In 2016, the venue hosted four episodes of the final season of American Idol.

In 2017, it was added to the National Trust for Historic Preservation list of America's Most Endangered Places "Success Stories"—sites that were named to the "Most Endangered" list that were the focus of successful preservation efforts.

Amy Knoll Fraser and Chef Neal Fraser are now the owners and operators of Redbird | Vibiana, a wedding, events and performing arts venue located in the Historic Core of Downtown Los Angeles.

== See also ==
- List of Catholic cathedrals in the United States
- List of cathedrals in the United States
