= Hompa Hongwanji Buddhist Temple =

Hompa Hongwanji Buddhist Temple may refer to:

- Hompa Hongwan-ji, Kyoto, Japan
- Honpa Hongwanji Mission of Hawaii, US
- Los Angeles Hompa Hongwanji Buddhist Temple, California, US
