= Little Tokyo, Los Angeles =

Japantown in Los Angeles

- Little Tokyo Historic District
- U.S. National Register of Historic Places
- U.S. National Historic Landmark District
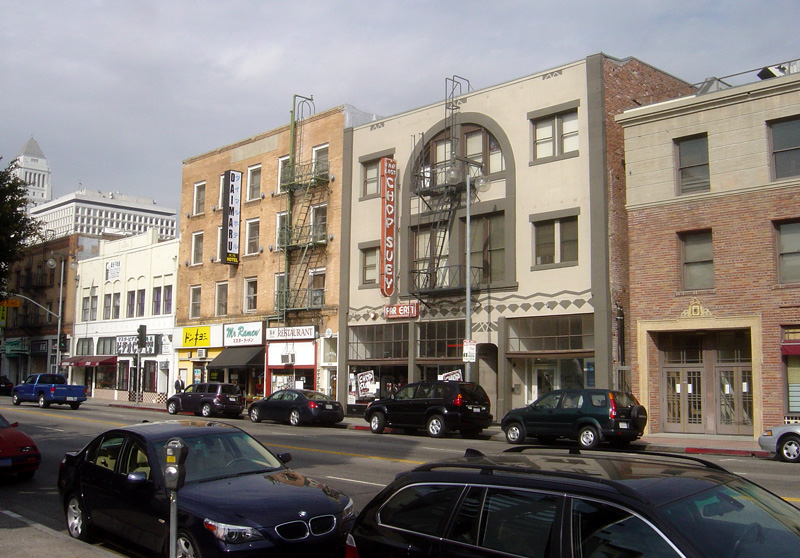
- The Far East Café (Chop Suey), a landmark 1896 Beaux-Arts building

- Location within Los Angeles
- Location: Los Angeles, California, U.S.
- Coordinates: 34°3′2″N 118°14′22″W
- Built: 1942
- Architects: Edgar Cline, Et al.
- NRHP reference No.: 86001479

Significant dates
- Added to NRHP: August 22, 1986
- Designated NHLD: June 12, 1995

Little Tokyo (Japanese: リトル・トーキョー; Hepburn; Ritoru Tōkyō), also known as Little Tokyo Historic District, is an ethnically Japanese American district in downtown Los Angeles and the heart of the largest Japanese-American population in North America. It is the largest and most populous of only three official Japantowns in the United States, all of which are in California (the other two are Japantown, San Francisco, and Japantown, San Jose). Founded around the beginning of the 20th century, the area (sometimes called Lil' Tokyo, J-Town, or Shō-Tōkyō (小東京)) is the cultural center for Japanese Americans in Southern California. It was declared a National Historic Landmark District in 1995.

== History ==
=== Origins: 1880s ===
The Chinese Exclusion Act of 1882 played a pivotal role in the first large wave of Japanese Immigration to the United States, as the Japanese were heavily recruited to serve as 'cheap labor' in place of the now excluded Chinese laborers.

One of the people influenced by this first wave of Japanese Immigration was Hamanosuke Shigeta, a Japanese seaman who settled in southeast Los Angeles, an area which would eventually become Little Tokyo. There Shigeta established the first Japanese-owned business in Los Angeles, Kame Restaurant, along First Street. Attracted by the restaurant and nearby demands for labor, other Japanese immigrant men followed suit as they settled along First Street in nearby boarding houses.

The first Japanese boarding house in Los Angeles was established by Sanjuro Mizuno, who opened the Santa Fe Boarding House in 1898 to cater to Japanese laborers. To accommodate the wave of new immigrants coming to Little Tokyo, other early immigrants opened additional boarding houses. After 1898, upon the conquest of the Philippines following the Philippine-American War, Filipinos immigrated around the vicinity of little Tokyo, mixing with the local Japanese.

=== Initial development: Late 1890s to 1930s ===
By the early 1900s the Japanese population in Little Tokyo had grown to around 3,000. It jumped to 10,000 following the 1906 San Francisco Earthquake, which convinced many local Japanese to move south to Los Angeles.

In 1907 the Gentleman's Agreement was signed between Japan and the United States in which Japan voluntarily restricted the emigration of Japanese laborers by allowing only families of current U.S. residents to immigrate. In exchange the United States was to ensure that there be no discrimination against the Japanese people. The implementation of the agreement led to an influx of women who joined family or husbands as new brides. This growth in community resulted in the establishment of a commercial district. By 1908 around 90 Japanese-run boarding houses could be found throughout Los Angeles.

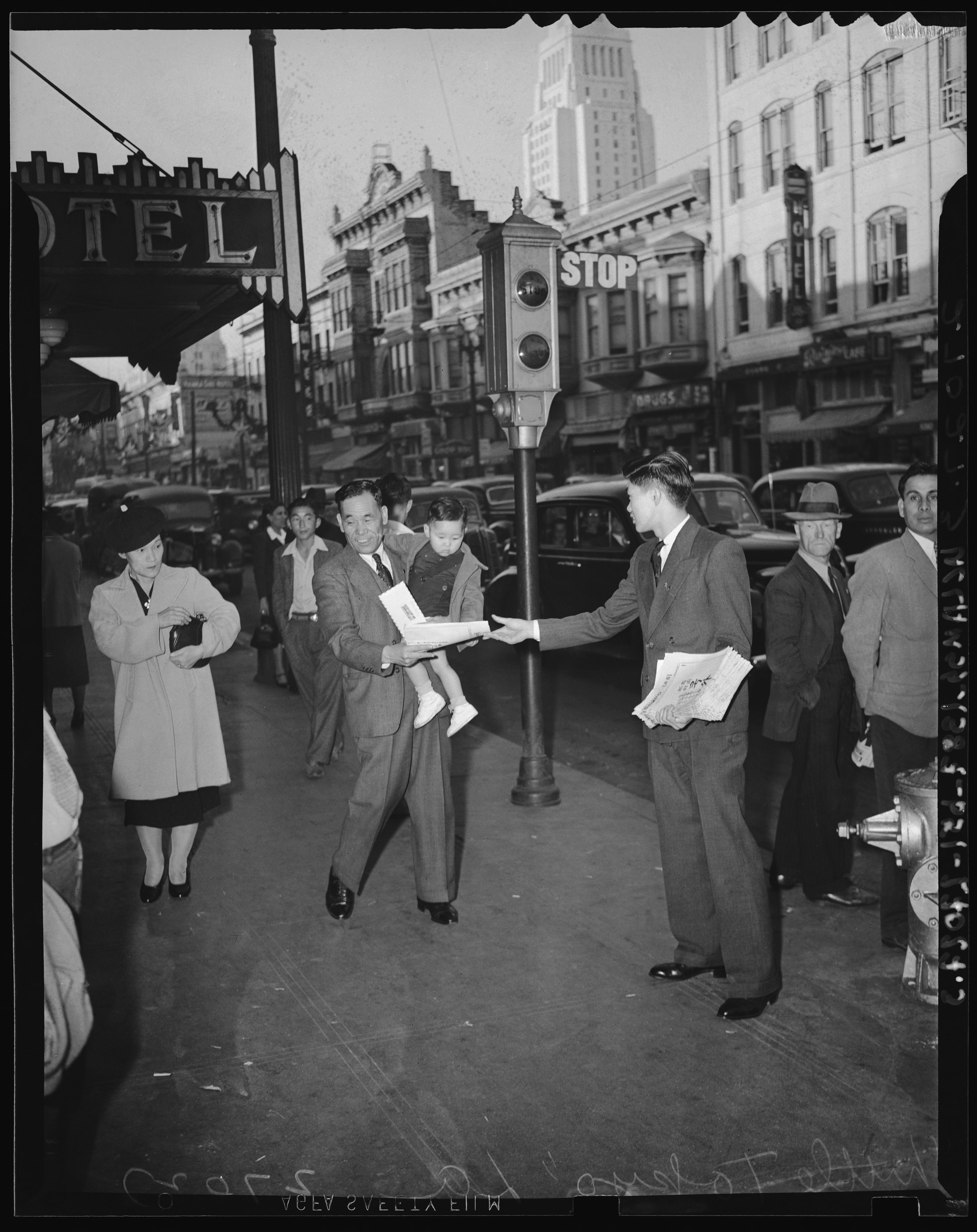
Selling the Rafu Shimpo in Little Tokyo the day after the Pearl Harbor attack, December 8, 1941

In 1909 Little Tokyo was described as "bounded by San Pedro, First and Requena Streets, and Central Avenue. The Los Angeles Times added: "It has a population of about 3,500 Japanese ... there are 10,000 Japanese in the city who make this section their rendezvous."

The area was a magnet for immigrating Japanese until the Exclusion Act of 1924 halted any further migration. Shops were located along First Street, and vegetable markets were along Central Avenue to the south. Japanese Americans were a significant ethnic group in the vegetable trade, due to the number of successful Japanese American truck farms across Southern California. Soon the oppressed Japanese were outnumbered by the similarly oppressed Filipinos who unlike Japanese immigrants, were considered US Nationals due to the American colonization of the Philippines in the Philippine-American Commonwealth.

==== Institutions, associations, and establishments ====
The Issei (first generation Japanese immigrants) congregated in the East First Street area, where the first Japanese institutions, associations, and establishments in Los Angeles were founded. The first Japanese religious institution in Little Tokyo was the Japanese Episcopal Mission of Los Angeles, now Century United Methodist Church, founded in June 1896 by a group of five Issei from southern Japan. Other religious institutions followed: the Koyasan Buddhist Temple (1912), Japanese Union Church (1923), and Hompa Hongwaji Buddhist Temple (1925).

The growing population in Little Tokyo was supplemented by the establishment of primary, secondary, and trade schools. A great number of trade schools in Little Tokyo were sewing schools. The largest was the Rafu Yossai Gakuen, which taught sewing skills to Issei women.

During this time period various newspapers catered towards Japanese Americans in Los Angeles were established. The first Japanese newspaper in the United States was Rafu Shimpo, founded in Little Tokyo in 1903 and which continues to operate.

Also founded during this time were rotating savings and credit associations known as tanomoshiko, which provided funding for emerging business ventures in the quarter.

Community leaders in the 1920s and 1930s established local entities of prominent Japanese American associations such as the Central Japanese Association, Japanese American Citizen's League (JACL), and the Japanese American Chamber of Commerce. Concurrently these leaders worked with Japan to establish kenjinkai, or mutual aid societies, each associated to one of the Japanese prefectures. These associations would provide aid and social opportunities to respective Japanese families who had immigrated from the same prefecture. By 1940 the breadth of kenjinkai covered 40 out of 46 Japanese prefectures.

=== World War II ===
In 1941 Little Tokyo reached its peak population with approximately 30,000 Japanese Americans. The 1941 Pearl Harbor bombing brought an end to the increase of the population, with the incarceration of Japanese Americans during World War II emptying out Little Tokyo.

Beginning in 1942, when the city's Japanese population had been rounded up and "evacuated" to inland concentration camps, a large number of African Americans from the South moved to Los Angeles to find work in the labor-starved defense industry. This influx from the Second Great Migration almost tripled Little Tokyo's pre-war population, with some 80,000 new arrivals taking up residence. For a brief time the area became known as Bronzeville, as African Americans, and also Native Americans and Latinos, occupied the vacated properties and opened up nightclubs, restaurants, and other businesses. Prohibited from buying and renting in most parts of the city by restrictive covenants, the area soon became severely overcrowded. A single bathroom was often shared by up to 40 people, and one room could house as many as 16 occupants; people frequently shared "hot beds," sleeping in shifts. Poor housing conditions helped spread communicable illnesses like tuberculosis and venereal diseases. Crimes like robberies, rapes, and hit-and-run accidents increased, and in May and June 1943 Latino and some African American residents of Bronzeville were attacked by whites in the Zoot Suit race riots.

In 1943 officials bowed to pressure from frustrated residents and proposed building temporary housing in nearby Willowbrook, but the majority-white residents of the unincorporated city resisted the plans. In 1944, 57 Bronzeville buildings were condemned as unfit for habitation, and 125 were ordered to be repaired or renovated; approximately 50 of the evicted families were sent to the Jordan Downs housing complex. In 1945 many defense industry jobs disappeared, and the workers moved elsewhere in search of new employment. Others were pushed out when Japanese Americans began to return and white landlords chose not to renew leases with their wartime tenants.

=== Post World War II ===
Following the War many previous Japanese residents returned to Little Tokyo to continue managing businesses by purchasing the Bronzeville business leases. Albeit smaller, a commercial core still managed to exist there. Due to lack of housing in Little Tokyo, many Japanese Americans returning from the camps moved into apartments and boarding houses in the neighborhoods surrounding downtown Los Angeles. Notably Boyle Heights, just east of Little Tokyo, had a large Japanese American population in the 1950s (as it had before the internment) until the arrival of Mexican and Latino immigrants replaced most of them. The post-war Japanese-American population in Little Tokyo had become only one-third of its pre-war figure.

Many Issei and Nisei who had previously owned large businesses or were heavily involved in agriculture now returned with few resources to work in civil service or other simple jobs. Concurrently a large redevelopment plan was put in place to be enacted in the early 1950s, but due to lacks in state funding and wealth in the Japanese-American community following three years of internment the plan fell into stagnation.

Following the construction there of the Los Angeles Police Department headquarters in 1953, Little Tokyo's commercial area shrunk by one fourth from its original size. 1,000 residents were displaced to other parts of Los Angeles. The current site of Parker Center, the LAPD's former headquarters, was the original site of the Nishi Hongwanji Buddhist Temple. The south edge of the block where Parker Center stands was part of the First Street business strip of shops. The warehouses and new condominiums to the east of Little Tokyo were once residential areas of the district.

Similar urban development would continue in the 1960s and 1970s, further shrinking the extent of the coverage of Little Tokyo.

=== 1970s to present ===
In the 1970s, a redevelopment movement started as Japanese corporations expanded overseas operations and many of them set up their U.S. headquarters in the Los Angeles area. Named the Little Tokyo Project, this movement resulted in the opening of several new shopping plazas and hotels opened, along with branches of some major Japanese banks. Although this redevelopment resulted in many new buildings and shopping centers, there are still some of the original Little Tokyo buildings and restaurants, especially along First Street. The Little Tokyo Project would transform Little Tokyo into its present version: an area bounded by Los Angeles Street, Alameda Street, Third Street, and half a block north from First Street. In the meantime, parts of the original Historic Filipinotown which was once mixed in with Little Tokyo got stripped of their Filipino elements by the Japanizing gentrification and many locals immigrated to the nearby surviving but newer portions of Historic Filipinotown which is now the official Filipinotown of Los Angeles.

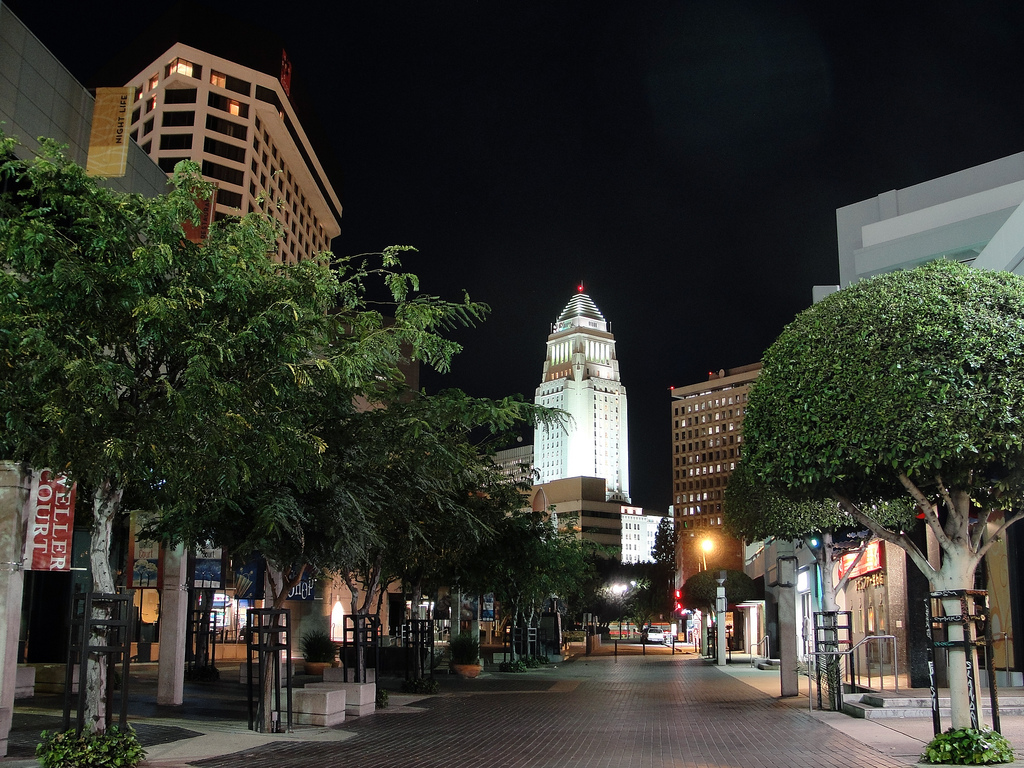
Astronaut Ellison S. Onizuka Street with Weller Court, Challenger Memorial and Los Angeles City Hall in the background

During the 1970s and 1980s, artists began to move into nearby aging warehouse spaces in the area, forming a hidden community in the industrialized area. Al's Bar, Gorky's, the Atomic Cafe and LA Contemporary Exhibitions (LACE) are some well-known sites.

Land use has been a contentious issue in Little Tokyo due to its history, the proximity to the Los Angeles Civic Center neighborhood, the role of Los Angeles as a site of business between Japan and America, and the increasing influx of residents into the Arts District. Unlike a traditional ethnic enclave, there are relatively few Japanese residents in the area. Even so, the Japanese-American community was politicized by the internment and redress effort, which, along with the global and local growth of overseas Japanese investment, has assured that Little Tokyo has continued to exist as a tourist attraction, community center, and home to Japanese-American senior citizens and others.

During its inception in 1980, the Weller Court mall was opposed by some people in the community because it redeveloped a strip of family-owned small businesses. Community activists established First Street as a historic district in 1986. In 2004, they helped reopen the Far East Cafe, an acknowledged community hub.

Little Tokyo continues to develop and change with the general development of the greater Los Angeles Area through a range of ordinances, construction, and coalitions. Sustainable Little Tokyo was founded in 2013 as an attempt to guide this development in a sustainable manner. The 2024 announcement of First North Residences and the Go For Broke Plaza, promises to provide essential housing units while serving as a permanent home for the Go For Broke National Education Center, a nonprofit dedicated to educating the public about the courage and sacrifices of Japanese-American soldiers.

== Description ==
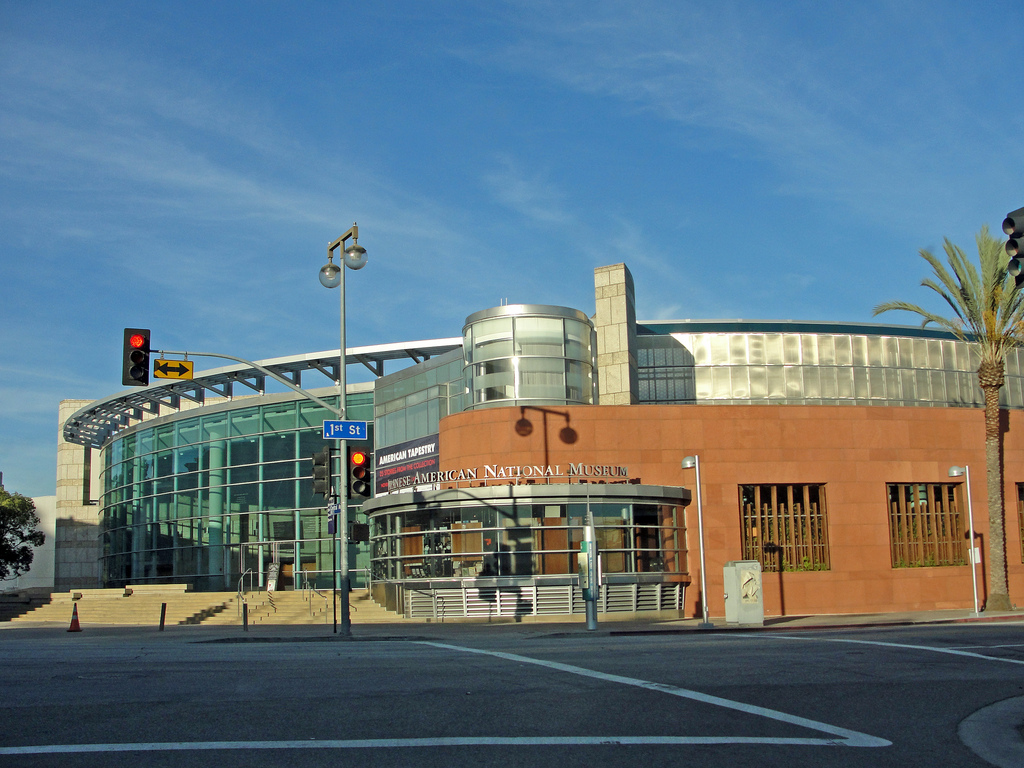
Japanese American National Museum

At its peak, Little Tokyo had approximately 30,000 Japanese Americans living in the area. Little Tokyo is still a cultural focal point for Los Angeles's Japanese American population. It is mainly a work, cultural, religious, restaurant and shopping district, because Japanese Americans today are likely to live in nearby cities such as Torrance, Gardena, and Monterey Park, as well as the Sawtelle district in the Westside of Los Angeles. However, the recent boom in downtown residential construction is changing the nature of Little Tokyo.

What is left of the original Little Tokyo can be found in roughly five large city blocks. It is bounded on the west by Los Angeles Street, on the east by Alameda Street, on the south by 3rd Street, and on the north by First Street, but also includes a substantial portion of the block north of First and west of Alameda, location of the Japanese American National Museum, the Go For Broke Monument, and a row of historic shops which lines the north side of First Street. A timeline has been set into the concrete in front of these shops, using bronze lettering, showing the history of each of the shops from the early 20th Century until the renovation of the district in the late 1980s. More broadly, Little Tokyo is bordered by the Los Angeles River to the east, downtown Los Angeles to the west, L.A. City Hall the Parker Center to the north, and Skid Row to the south.

== Attractions ==
=== Museums and galleries ===
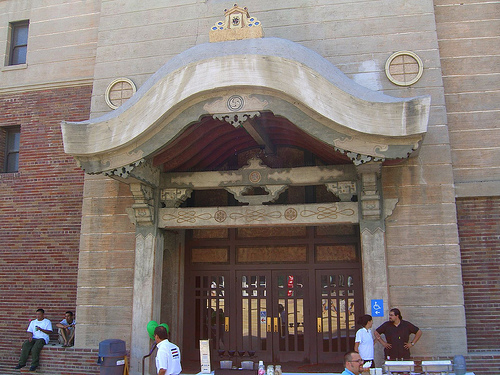
The original Hompa Honganji Buddhist Temple. Across from the building is the Japanese American National Museum opened in 1992, fifty years after President Franklin D. Roosevelt ordered the forcible removal and incarceration of people of Japanese descent.

Museums include the Japanese American National Museum and an extension of the Museum of Contemporary Art, formerly called the Temporary Contemporary and now known as the Geffen Contemporary (named after David Geffen). Additionally, the visual arts are represented by the arts non-profit, LAArtcore which devotes itself to creating awareness of the visual arts through 24 exhibitions each year along with educational programming. An art gallery called 123 Astronaut is housed within a kiosk on Astronaut Ellison Onizuka Street and contains a monument to Astronaut Ellison S. Onizuka, a Japanese American from Hawaiʻi who was a mission specialist on the Space Shuttle Challenger when it disintegrated during takeoff in 1986.

=== Public art ===
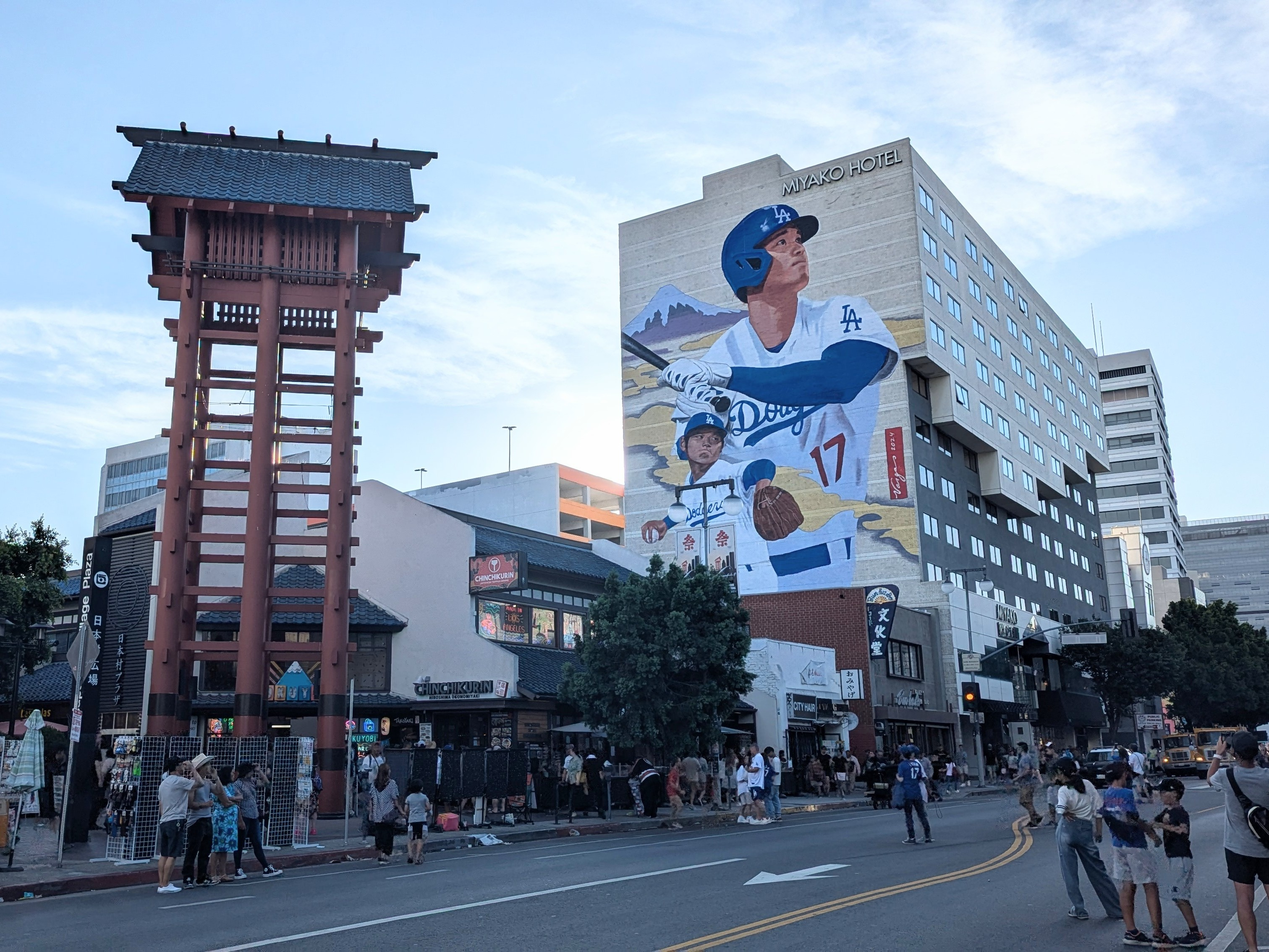
A mural of baseball player Shohei Ohtani in Little Tokyo.

Little Tokyo has a variety of public art, including a memorial statue of Chiune Sugihara, Japanese consul to Lithuania before World War II and Righteous among the Nations.

=== Events ===
The Nisei Week festival is held every August, and includes a large parade, a pageant, athletic events, exhibits of Japanese art and culture, a taiko drum festival, the Japanese Festival Street Faire, a car show, and other events.

=== Gardens ===
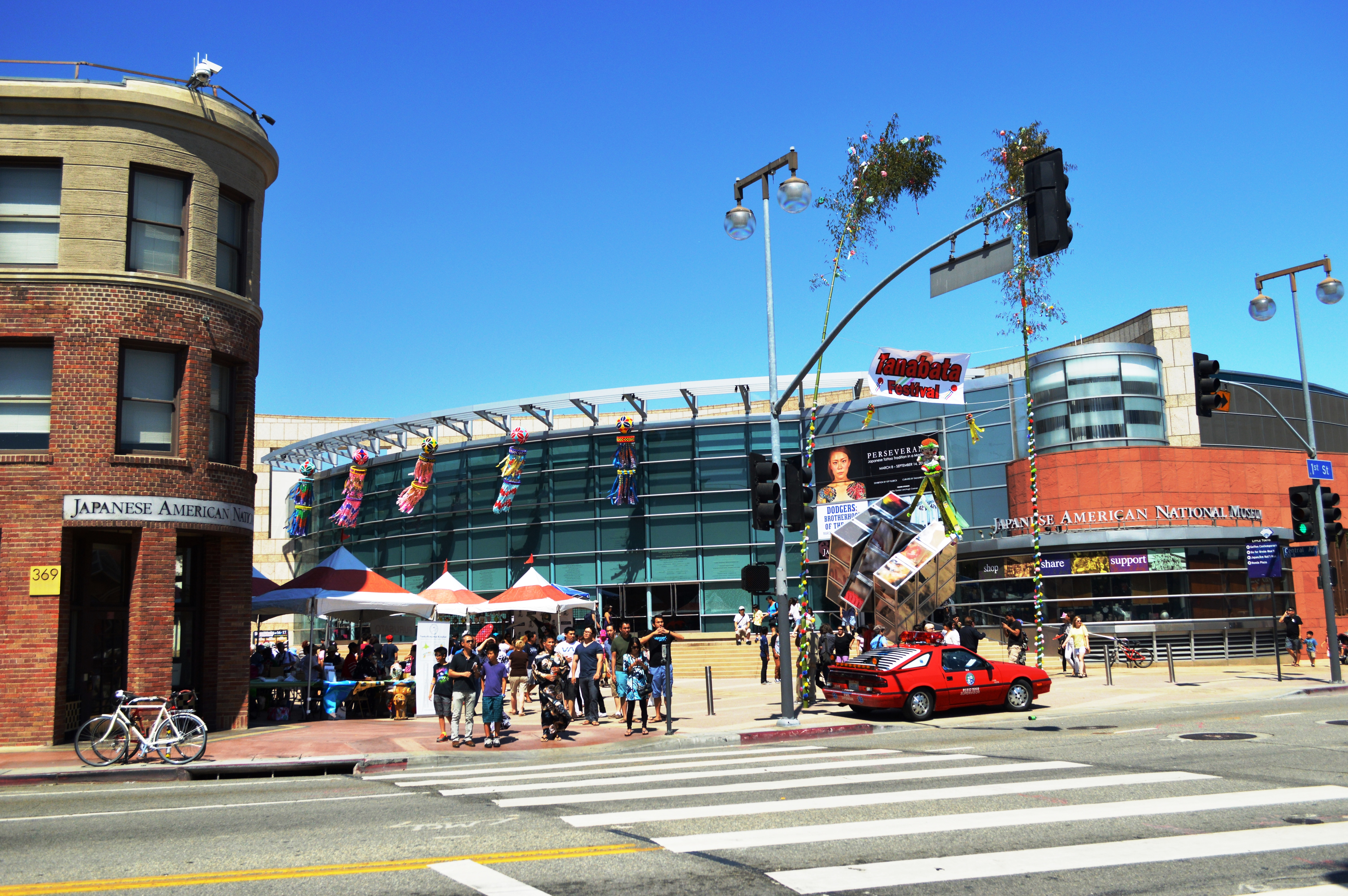
Japanese American National Museum during the tanabata festival (2014).

There are also two Japanese gardens in the area open to the public: the James Irvine garden in the Japanese American Cultural and Community Center and a rooftop garden in the Kyoto Grand Hotel and Gardens, formerly the New Otani Hotel. The Go for Broke Monument commemorates Japanese Americans who served in the United States Military during World War II.

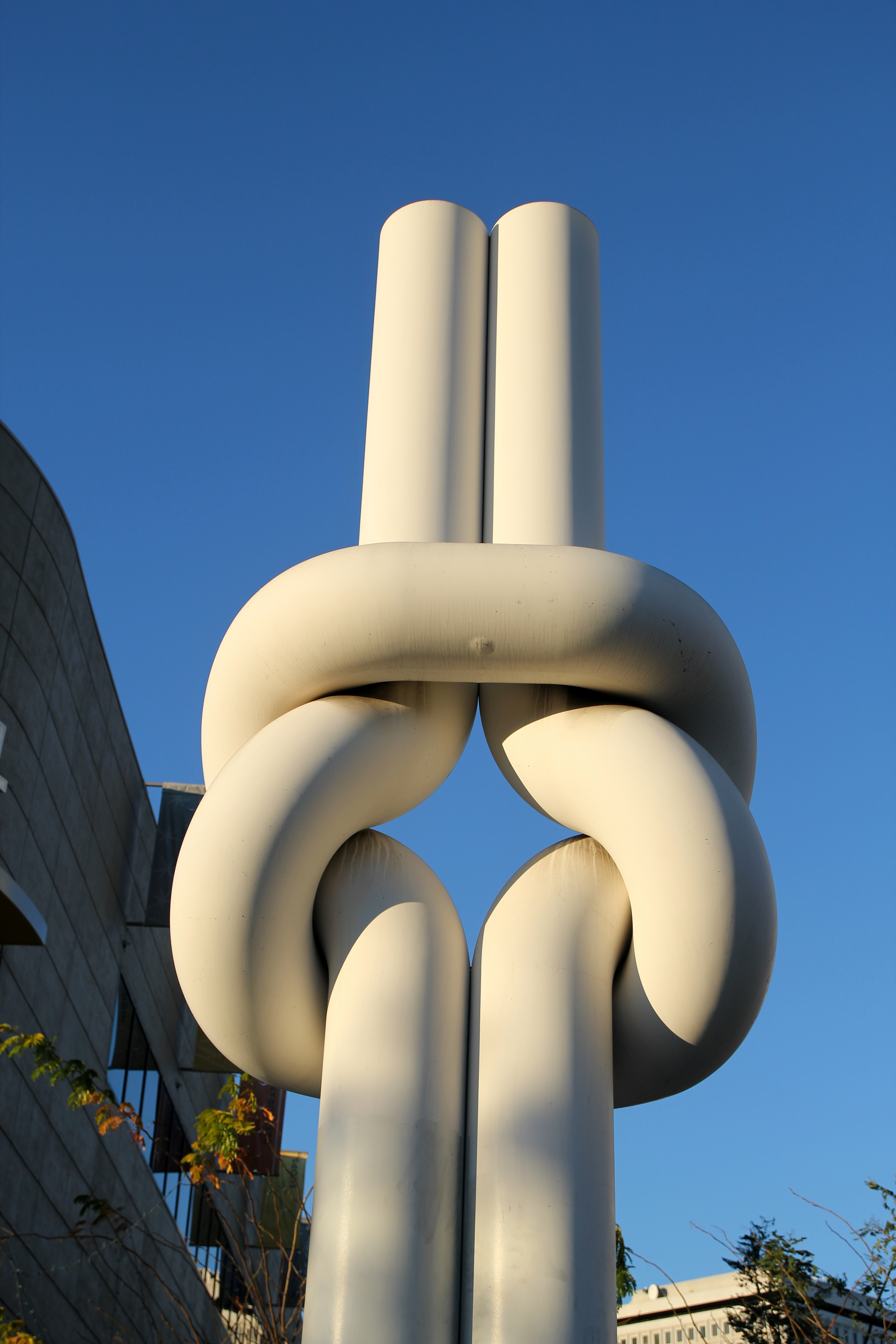
Friendship knot sculpture

=== Performing arts ===
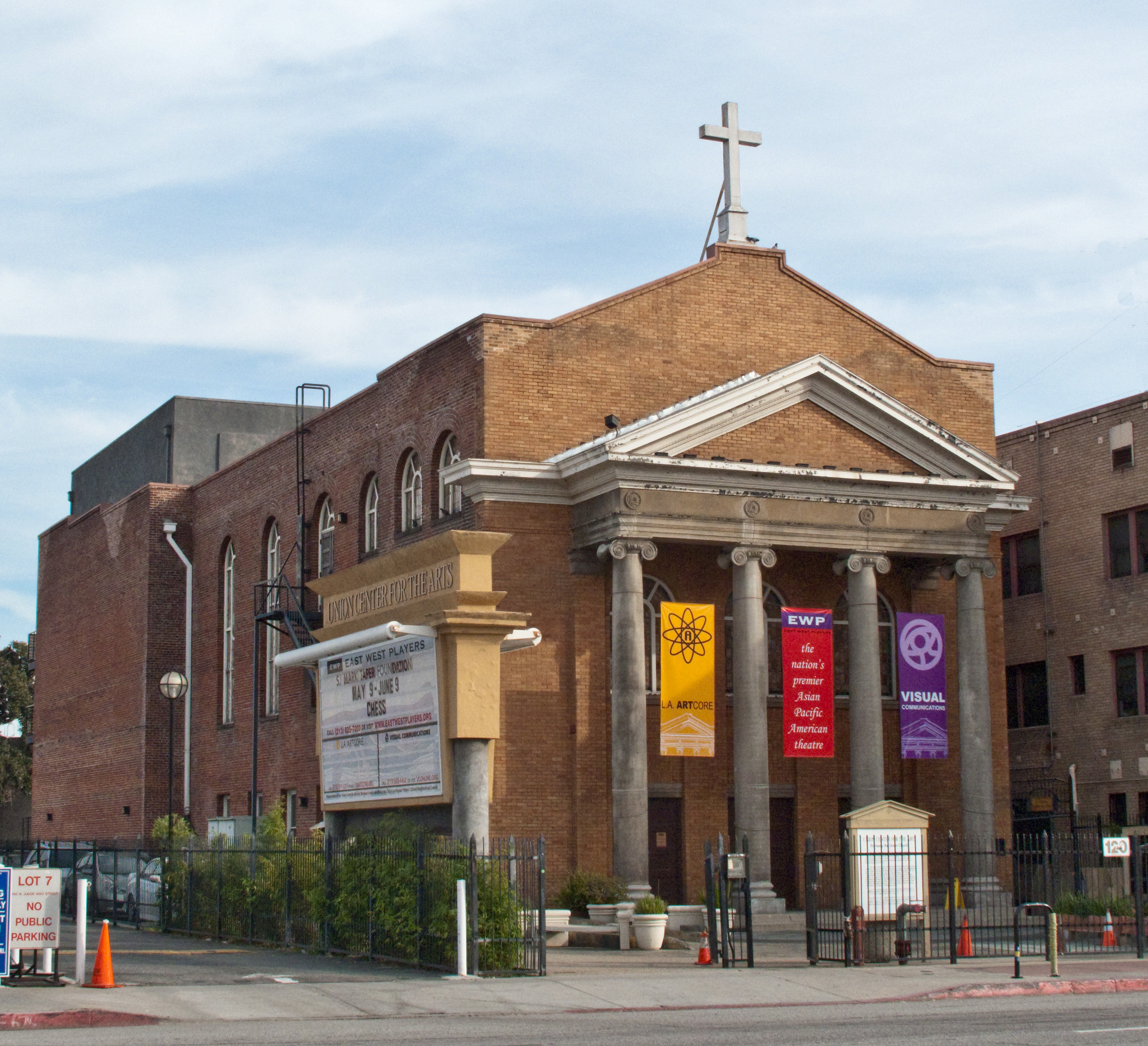
The Union Center for the Arts serves as the home venue for the East West Players, Visual Communications, LAArtcore and Tuesday Night Project.

With its proximity to Hollywood and its concentration as a focal point for the Pan Asian American community, Little Tokyo Los Angeles has long served as an incubator for Asian American and Pacific Islander artists and performers sporting a high concentration of legacy institutions.

East West Players, one of the nation's first Asian American theater companies and the longest continuously running theatre of color in the nation, specializing in live theater written and performed by Asian American artists, is located in Little Tokyo, performing in the David Henry Hwang Theater, a 230-seat venue in the Union Center for the Performing Arts.

The Japanese American Cultural & Community Center (JACCC) runs the 800 seat Aratani Theater, which features theatre, dance, concerts as well as cultural performances and events.

Visual Communications, an Asian Pacific American media arts organization that annually presents VC FilmFest (Los Angeles Asian Pacific Film Festival), in several venues around Little Tokyo.

Tuesday Night Cafe is the longest running Asian American open Mic event in the nation running every 1st and 3rd Tuesday from April through October in the public courtyard of the Union Center for the Arts

Cold Tofu Improv was founded in 1981 as the nation's first Asian American Improv & Comedy Group. Teaching classes in short form and long form improv.

Kollaboration founded in 2000, is an organization focusing on advancing Asian, Pacific Islander, and Desi Americans (APIDA) in the Music and entertainment industries. With affiliates in San Francisco, Atlanta, Hawaii, Houston, Boston and throughout the country, the organization hosts its annual national culmination "KOLLABORATION STAR" event at the Aratani Theatre, as well as their EMPOWER conference as incubator events for APIDA artists in the music industry.

With the proximity of these organizations and Arts non-profit organizations, many notable actors, musicians and entertainers of AAPI descent have either begun their careers here, or continue to maintain a presence. East West Players saw the early careers of actors such as Daniel Dae Kim, John Cho, Reggie Lee, Amy Hill, Lucy Liu, Isa Briones, as well as playwrights Qui Nguyen. Lauren Yee, and David Henry Hwang. In 2018, actor George Takei returned to Little Tokyo for the first Post Broadway staging of the musical Allegiance by Jay Kuo & Lorenzo Thione co-produced by East West Players and the JACCC at the Aratani Theatre. The Aratani has also served as a home venue to the Grammy Nominated Jazz fusion group Hiroshima (band) founded by Dan Kuramoto & June Kuramoto. Actress Tamlyn Tomita began her career when she was crowned "Nisei Week Queen" in 1984 which led to her breakout casting in The Karate Kid Part 2. Filmmakers such as Justin Lin, Quentin Lee, and Justin Chon have premiered some of their early career making films at the Los Angeles Asian Pacific Film Festival. Actor Dante Basco has been a mainstay performing his poetry alongside many others at Tuesday Night Project. Musicians such as AJ Rafael, Jane Lui, MC Jin and more have long relationships with Kollaboration since before the "youtube-boom" that saw many AAPI artists and musicians find an internet based audience.

Little Tokyo continues to be a major convening point for AAPI artists in the entertainment industry, and a central incubator for the nation having twice before hosted the National Asian American Theatre Conference and Festival put on by the Consortium of Asian American Theatre Artists. Little Tokyo has also seen the rise of many adjacent movements in the AAPI entertainment world such as Asian American theater companies Teada, Lodestone Theatre, Artists at Play, Hereandnow Theatre, Asian AF Comedy shows, and the Comedy Comedy Festival.

=== Shopping and dining ===
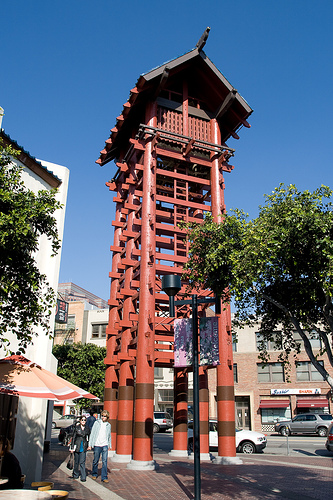
Little Tokyo Watchtower

There are numerous Japanese restaurants, catering to both Japanese and non-Japanese clientele. Many of them specialize in one type of Japanese cuisine, such as donburi, Japanese noodles (soba, ramen and udon), shabu-shabu (which translated from Japanese means 'swish-swish', referring to the motion of dipping meat and vegetables in a communal bowl of boiling water), Japanese curry, sushi, Japanese Souffle Pancakes or yakitori. There are also a number of yakiniku restaurants, where meat is often cooked on a small grill built into the center of the table. Little Tokyo is the birthplace of the California roll, invented by a chef named Ichiro Mashita at the Tokyo Kaikan sushi restaurant.

Two wagashi (Japanese sweets) shops located in Little Tokyo are among the oldest food establishments in Los Angeles. Fugetsu-do, founded in 1903, appears to be the oldest still-operating food establishment in the city and the first one to celebrate a centennial; its best-known offerings include mochi and manjū, and it claims to be an inventor of the fortune cookie. Mikawaya was founded in 1910, but is now well known as the company that introduced mochi ice cream to the United States in 1994.

Little Tokyo has several shops that specialize in Japanese-language videos and DVDs, while other shops specialize in Japanese electronics and video games. These include Japanese video games that were either never translated into English, or were never domestically released in North America. There are also several stores that sell manga and anime related products.

==== Japanese Village Plaza ====
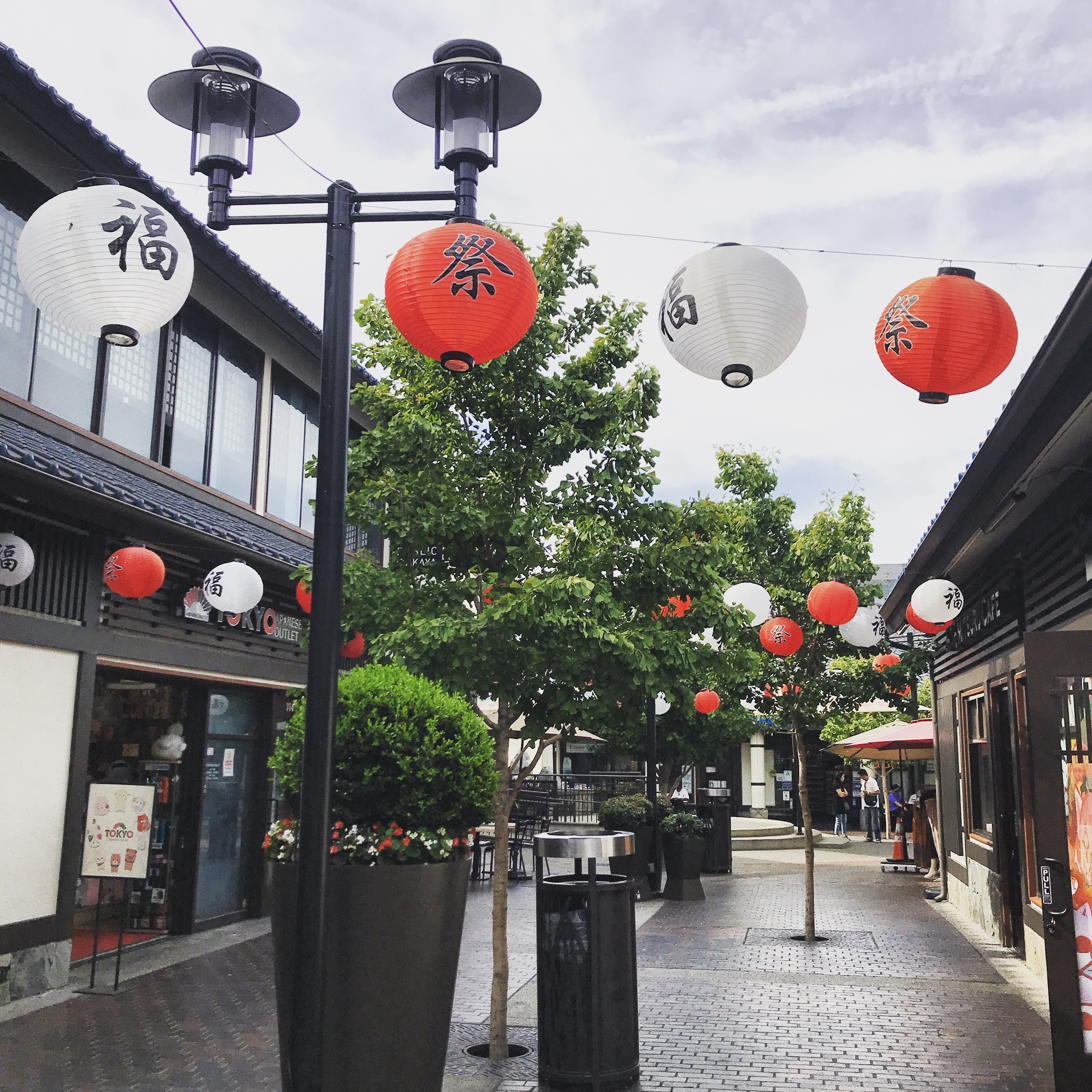
Japanese Village Plaza

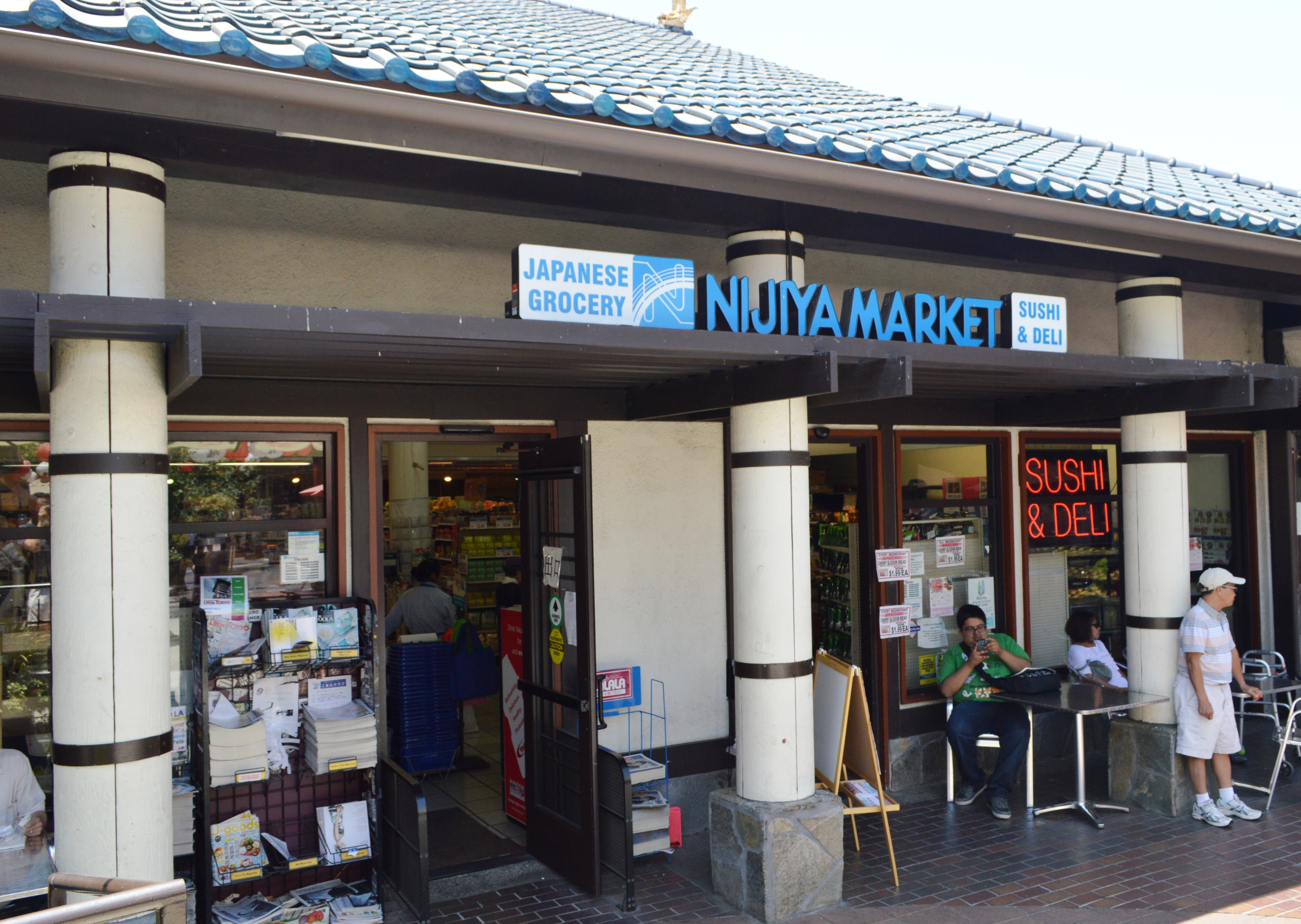
Nijiya Market in Little Tokyo's Japanese Village Plaza

The Japanese Village Plaza is located roughly in the center of Little Tokyo on the east side of San Pedro Street. There are several restaurants in the plaza, plus a number of shops geared towards tourists. First Street and Second Street border Japanese Village Plaza and have a number of restaurants that are open later than those in the court.

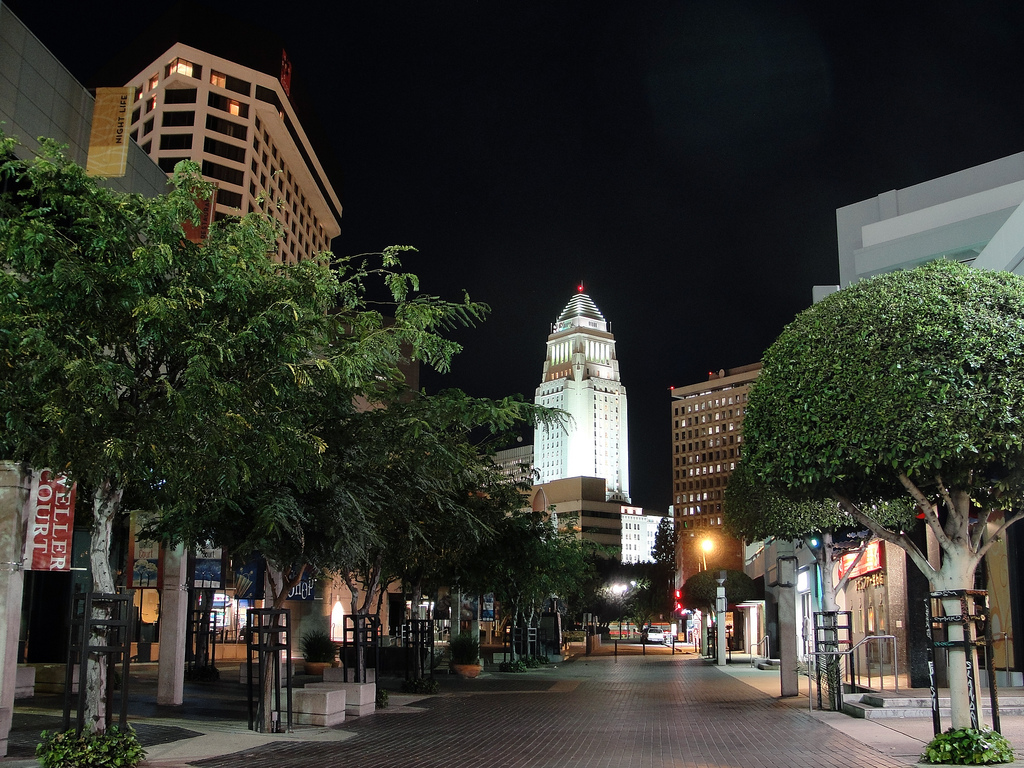
Weller Court

==== Weller Court ====
The Weller Court shopping mall is located along Astronaut Ellison S Onizuka St., backing up to 2nd St. on the south and what was originally the New Otani Hotel, now the DoubleTree by Hilton Hotel Los Angeles Downtown, along Los Angeles Street, to the north and west. It has several restaurants, karaoke clubs, and a Bubble Tea cafe. For tourists visiting from Japan, there are a number of shops specializing in expensive name brand products such as Coach handbags. There is also a large bookstore, Kinokuniya, that is part of a well-known Japanese chain. They have a large selection of Japanese-language books, magazines, music CDs, manga, and anime, as well as a selection of English-language books on Japanese subjects and translated manga and anime.

Weller Court was the second major project of the East West Development Corporation in association with the Community Redevelopment Agency, after the $30 million New Otani. Groundbreaking was held in November 1978, to be completed in 1979 with 62,780 square feet (5,832 m^{2}) of gross leasable area. The architect was Kajima Associates.

In the 1920s, the southeast corner of First Street was the beginning of Little Tokyo. At this corner was the Tomio Building, home to the Japanese-American Tomio Department Store, and two more Japanese-American department stores, the Asia Company and Hori Brothers.

== Education ==
The area is served by the Los Angeles Unified School District.

- 9th Street Elementary School
- Hollenbeck Middle School
- Belmont High School

Los Angeles Public Library operates the Little Tokyo Branch.

The main office of the Asahi Gakuen, a part-time Japanese school, was formerly in room 308 on the third floor of the Japanese American Cultural & Community Center (JACCC, 日米文化会館 Nichibei Bunka Kaikan) building, located in Little Tokyo. Since then, it moved to Harbor Gateway, near Torrance.

== Religion ==
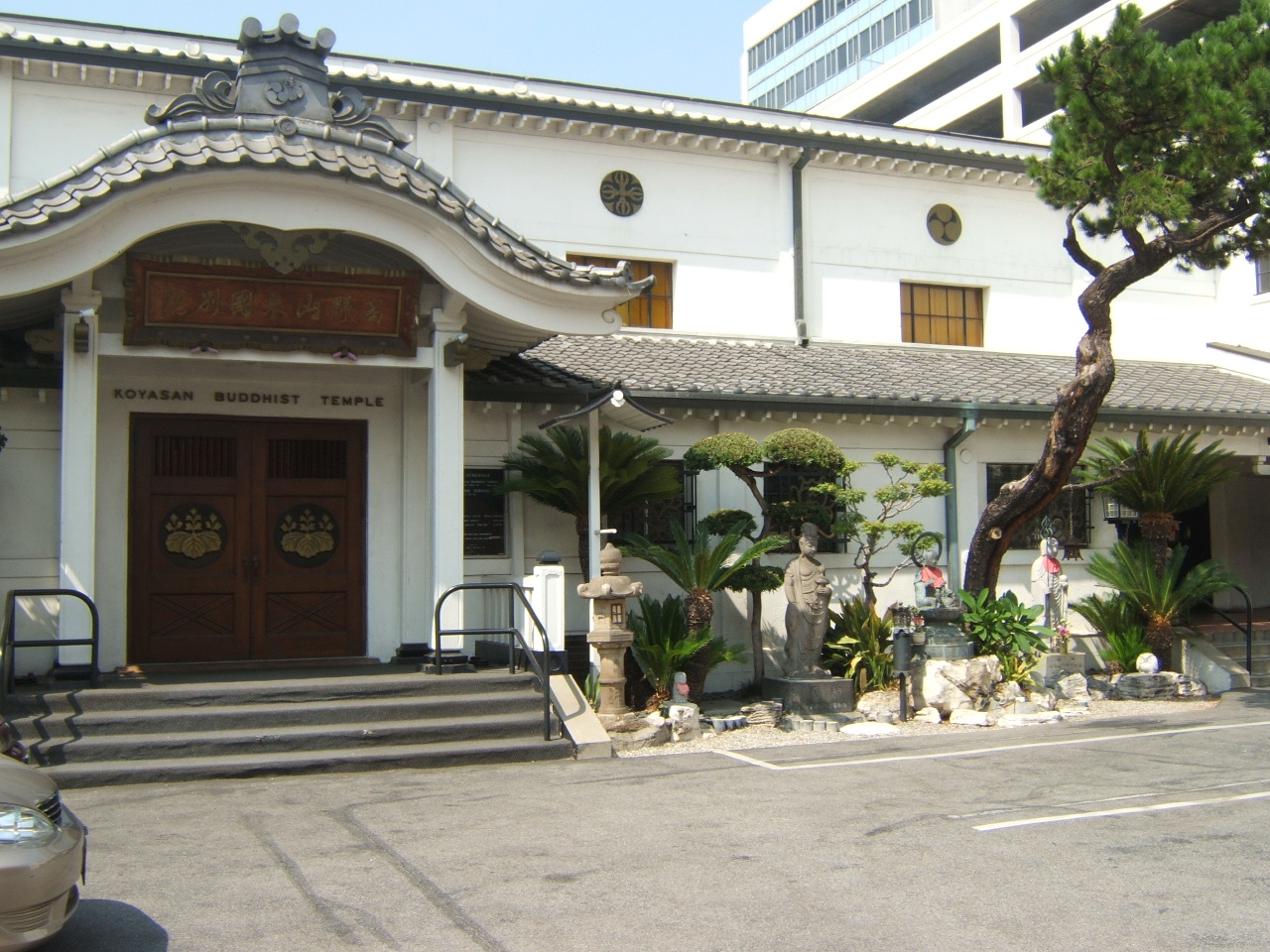
Koyasan Buddhist temple in Little Tokyo

There are several Buddhist temples in or near Little Tokyo, representing many major schools of Japanese Buddhism: Jodo Shinshu, Jodo Shu, Shingon, Nichiren, and Soto Zen. They are Zenshuji Soto Mission, Los Angeles Hompa Hongwanji (usually called Nishi Hongwanji), Higashi Honganji, Koyasan Buddhist Temple, Nichiren Shu Beikoku Betsuin, and the Jodo Shu North America Buddhist Missions. Together they form the Los Angeles Buddhist Temple Federation (Jodo Shinshu temples in Long Beach and near USC are also members).

Little Tokyo is also home to Japanese American Christian communities. Centenary United Methodist Church was founded in 1896 by first-generation Japanese American immigrants. Union Church of Los Angeles, founded in 1918, represents a long tradition of Japanese American Presbyterianism.

St. Francis Xavier Chapel and Japanese Catholic Center (also known as "Maryknoll") has been the base of the Japanese Catholic community in Los Angeles since 1912. Fr Albert Breton, a Japanese-speaking missionary of the Paris Foreign Mission Society, with the support of Bishop Thomas Conaty of the Diocese of Los Angeles, established the community on December 25, 1912. The first Japanese Mass was celebrated at the Bronson House on Jackson Street near the current Fukui Mortuary on Temple Street. The center also formerly housed the Maryknoll School, administered by the Maryknoll Fathers from the early 1920s until the mid-1990s. Currently, Masses are offered in Japanese and English at St. Francis Xavier each Sunday.

One of the roots of Pentecostalism started in Little Tokyo. Where the Japanese American Cultural and Community Center Plaza is now located was once the home of the First Pentecostal Church, a multiracial congregation called the Azusa Street Mission. This is where the Azusa Street Revival started in 1906. Earlier, it was also the site of First African Methodist Episcopal Church.

The former Catholic Cathedral of Saint Vibiana is just to the west of Little Tokyo. After being heavily damaged in the 1994 Northridge earthquake, the archdiocese moved to a new site (now the Cathedral of Our Lady of the Angels) and the old site was redeveloped. The former cathedral was converted into a performing arts space and non-historic buildings on the site demolished and replaced with a new Little Tokyo Branch of the Los Angeles Public Library.

== Transportation ==
The community is served by the Metro A Line and Metro E Line at Little Tokyo/Arts District station at the northeastern perimeter of Little Tokyo and is also walkable from the Metro B and D subway lines at either Civic Center/Grand Park station or Union Station – with connections to Amtrak, Metrolink, and the Metro J Line BRT. When the A and E Lines connected to the former L Line, via the Regional Connector, the original Little Tokyo/Arts District station was moved underground and across the street. This required demolition of two modest, one-story brick buildings. The two structures played an important role in the cultural life of the neighborhood for decades with one of the structures dating back at least to 1898.

Metro Local lines 30 and 330 serve Little Tokyo. In March 2020, Metro selected a development firm responsible for constructing the new Regional Connector station. Community representatives from the Little Tokyo Business Association, the Japanese American National Museum, and former U.S. Transportation Secretary Norman Mineta expressed their concerns about Metro's decision. Matters regarding the selection process, community needs, and design aesthetics delayed the project. The Little Tokyo/Arts District station was completed and reopened on June 16, 2023.

== In popular culture ==
The district appears in the films Showdown in Little Tokyo, Beverly Hills Ninja and The Crimson Kimono. When the Japanese anime series Kyatto Ninden Teyandee (キャッ党忍伝てやんでえ) was localized in English as Samurai Pizza Cats, the series' main setting "Edoropolis" was renamed Little Tokyo.

== See also ==
- History of the Japanese in Los Angeles
- List of Buddhist temples
- List of districts and neighborhoods of Los Angeles
- Sawtelle Boulevard
- Shoson Nagahara
