= Mariachi Plaza =

Public square in Boyle Heights, Los Angeles

- Plaza del Mariachi
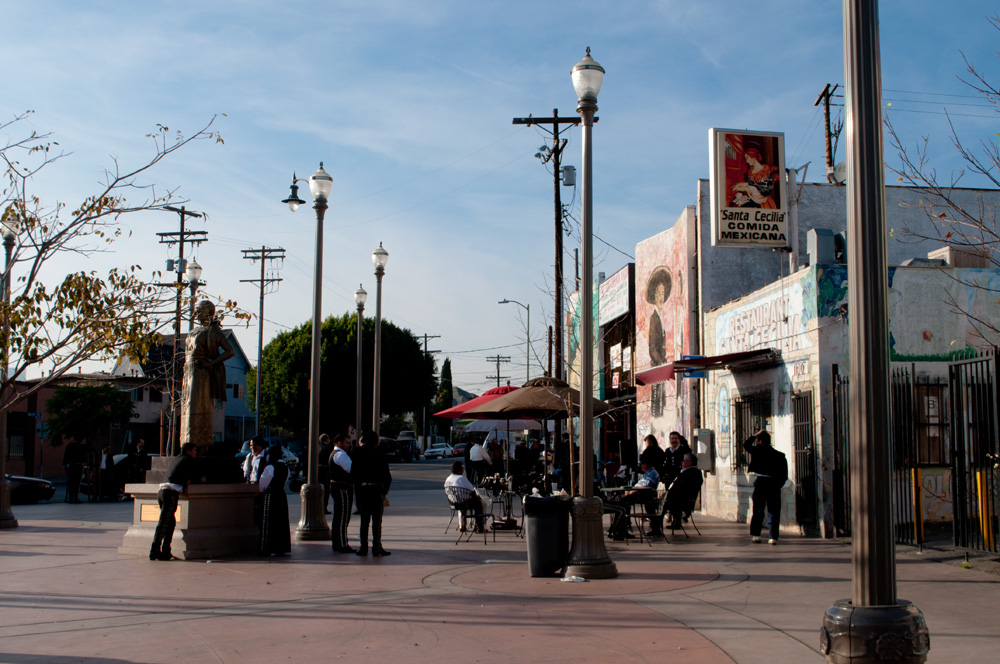
- Available for hire, mariachi bands wait at the plaza.
- Dedicated to: Mariachi music
- Location: Boyle Heights, Los Angeles, California, United States
- Interactive map of Mariachi Plaza
- Coordinates: 34.047486°N 118.219392°W

Mariachi Plaza, also known in Spanish as Plaza del Mariachi, is a plaza located in the Boyle Heights district of the city of Los Angeles, California. The plaza is known for its history as a center for mariachi music. Since the 1950s, mariachi musicians have gathered there in the hopes of being hired by visitors who are looking for a full band, trio, or solo singer. The plaza resembles Mexico's famed Plaza Garibaldi both in form and function, and it also serves as a historic gateway to the neighborhood.

== History ==
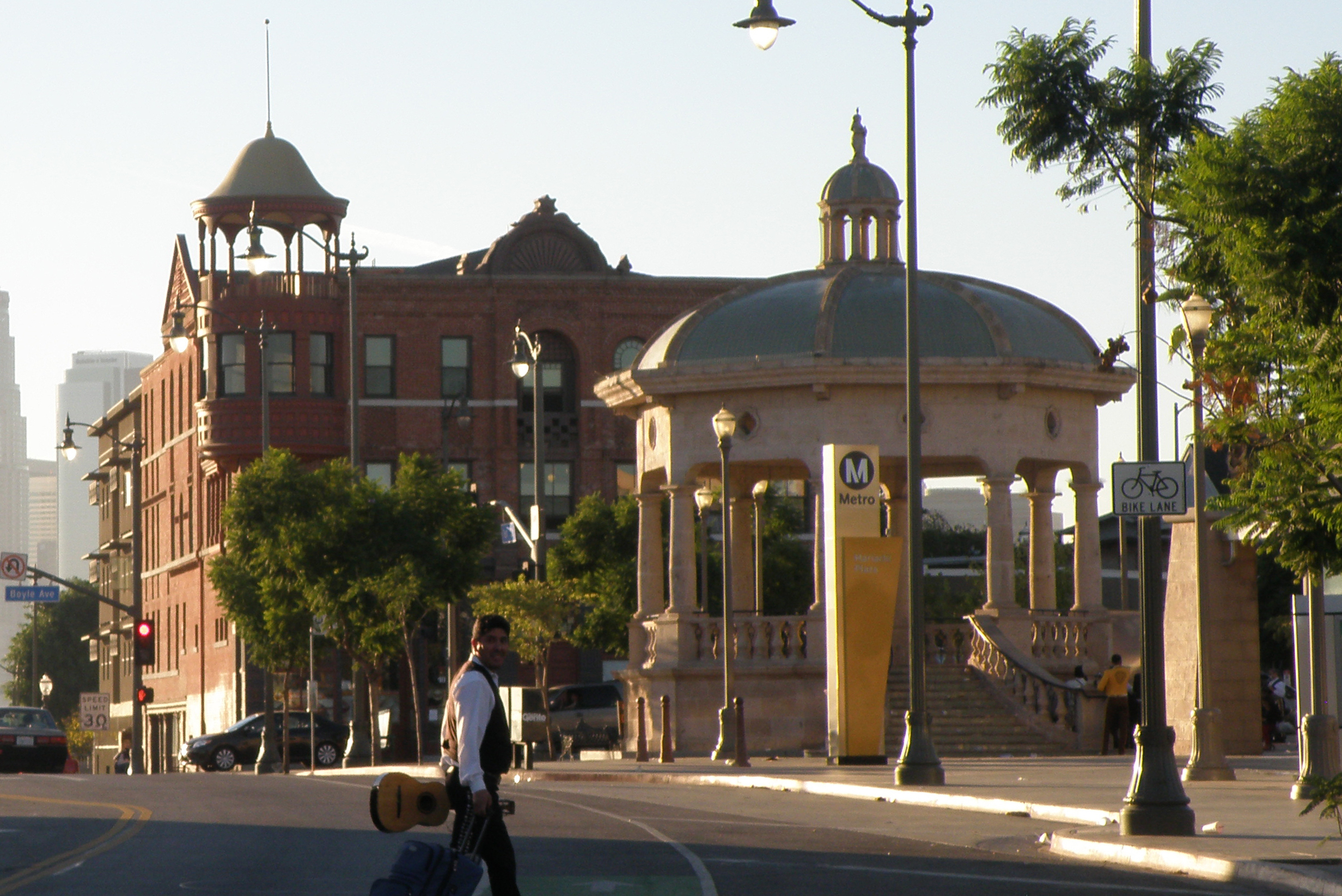
The kiosk in Mariachi Plaza.

As early as the 1930s, the area between Boyle Avenue and Bailey Street served as an informal gathering place for musicians seeking work. In the 1950s, a mariachi named Juan Gonzalez Muñiz, "El Cochero" (the Coachman), also known as the fundador (founder) of "La Boyle", is said to have stopped at the gas station that once stood on the corner and wandered around the neighborhood. There, he found rooms for rent for $7 per week and encouraged his mariachi friends to join him. Since then, musicians have gathered around the plaza and hotel, which has now become an affordable living complex, waiting to be hired.

In the early 1980s, the Department of Cultural Affairs and Metro formulated a plan to transform this gathering space into a legitimate public square. On November 22, 1992, which is the feast day of Saint Cecilia, the groundbreaking for the new Plaza del Mariachi de Los Angeles took place. Mariachi Plaza was designed and created by Frank Villalobos, an FAIA (Fellow of the American Institute of Architects), from Barrio Planners Incorporated. Six years later, in 1998, the Governor of the State of Jalisco, Alberto Cardenas-Jimenez, in Mexico, funded the addition of a traditional Cantera stone kiosk. This kiosk was designed, hand-carved, and assembled by Guadalajaran stone artisan Juan Pablo Salas. The kiosk located in the plaza is similar to those found in Mexico. It is ornamental but has faced criticism for its poor acoustics.

In 2001, the State of Jalisco continued to support the development of the plaza by donating seventeen wrought iron benches, each representing municipalities in Jalisco".

== Description ==
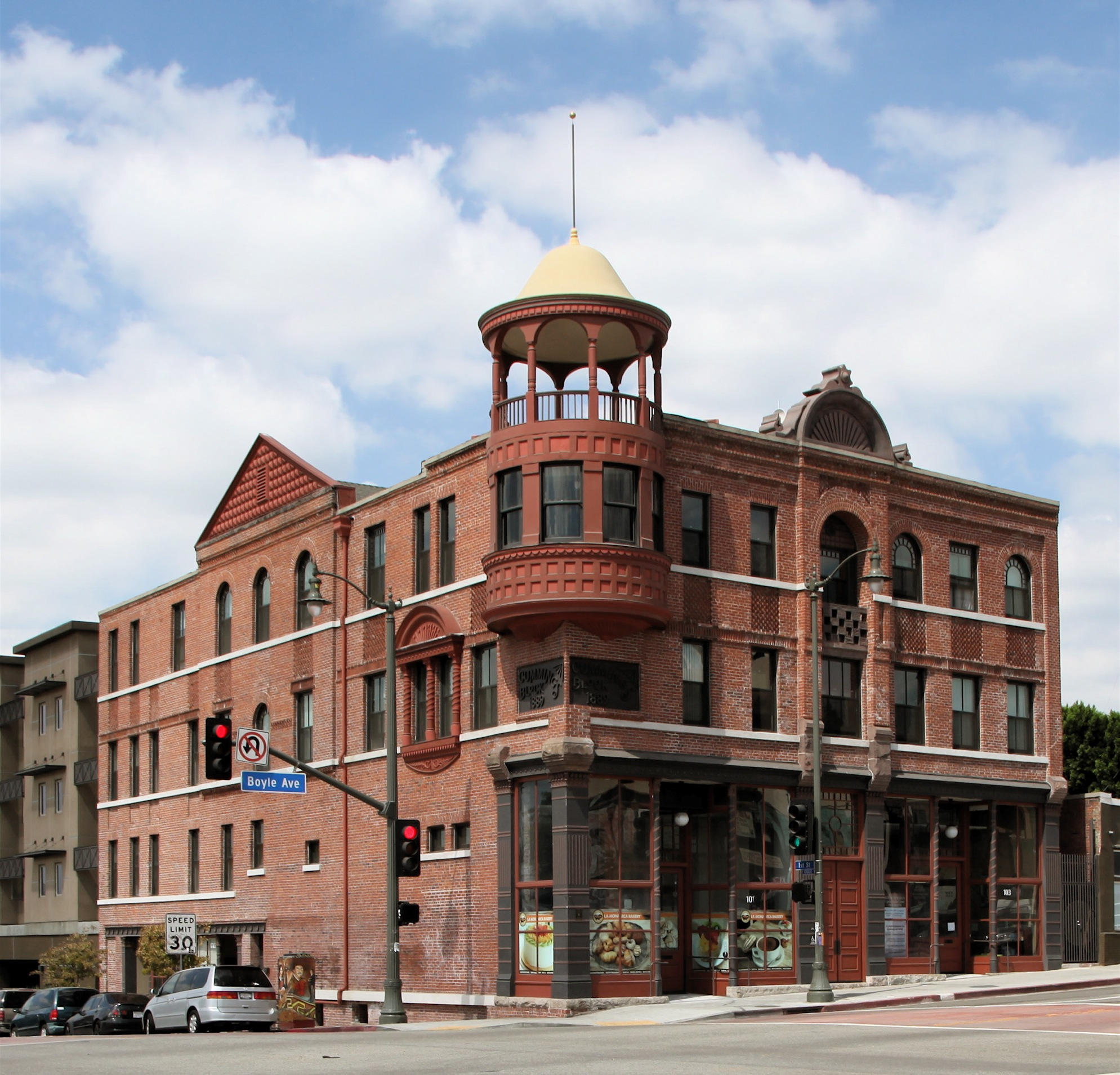
Boyle Hotel

Mariachi Plaza has evolved into a historic gateway and serves as the venue for numerous celebrations, festivals, and community events. In 2009, a bandstand was added, and local leaders are working to promote the plaza as a sanctuary for musicians. Every November, on the feast day of Santa Cecilia, Mariachi Plaza comes alive with a procession of mariachis.

The plaza is located between E. 1st Street to the south, N. Boyle Avenue to the west, and a small residential street named Pleasant Avenue to the north. It is surrounded by the East Los Angeles Interchange, situated between Interstates 5, 10, and 101.

On Mexican Independence Day 2022, Boyle Heights honored the Mexican ranchera legend Vicente Fernández, affectionately known as "Chente." A purple curtain dropped, and a stretch of Bailey Street bordering Mariachi Plaza was renamed Vicente Fernández Street. This newly christened street spans approximately 400 feet, extending from the edge of Mariachi Plaza to the gates of Adventist Health White Memorial Hospital, covering a two-block segment. It is situated between 1st Street and Pennsylvania Avenue, near the historic Mariachi Plaza.

Papel picado hung across Mariachi Plaza, adorning the area as a crowd was serenaded by live musicians through loudspeakers. In attendance at the unveiling ceremony was Fernández's widow, Maria del Refugio Abarca Villaseñor, known as "Doña Cuquita," alongside other local elected officials. Mariachi musicians and dancers performed during the naming ceremony, rendering some of Fernández's legendary songs, including La Ley Del Monte (English: "The state of nature") by songwriter José Ángel Espinoza, which symbolizes a scenario where life's contract imposes restrictions upon individuals that curtail their natural rights, and "El Rey" (English: "The King") by José Alfredo Jiménez, which was performed at the closing ceremony.

Fernández becomes the second ranchera legend to have a street named after them on Bailey Street. The pioneering singer Lucha Reyes has a statue in Mariachi Plaza, and signs welcoming visitors to Avenida Lucha Reyes were placed along Bailey Street in 2014.

== Transportation ==
=== Metro Rail station ===
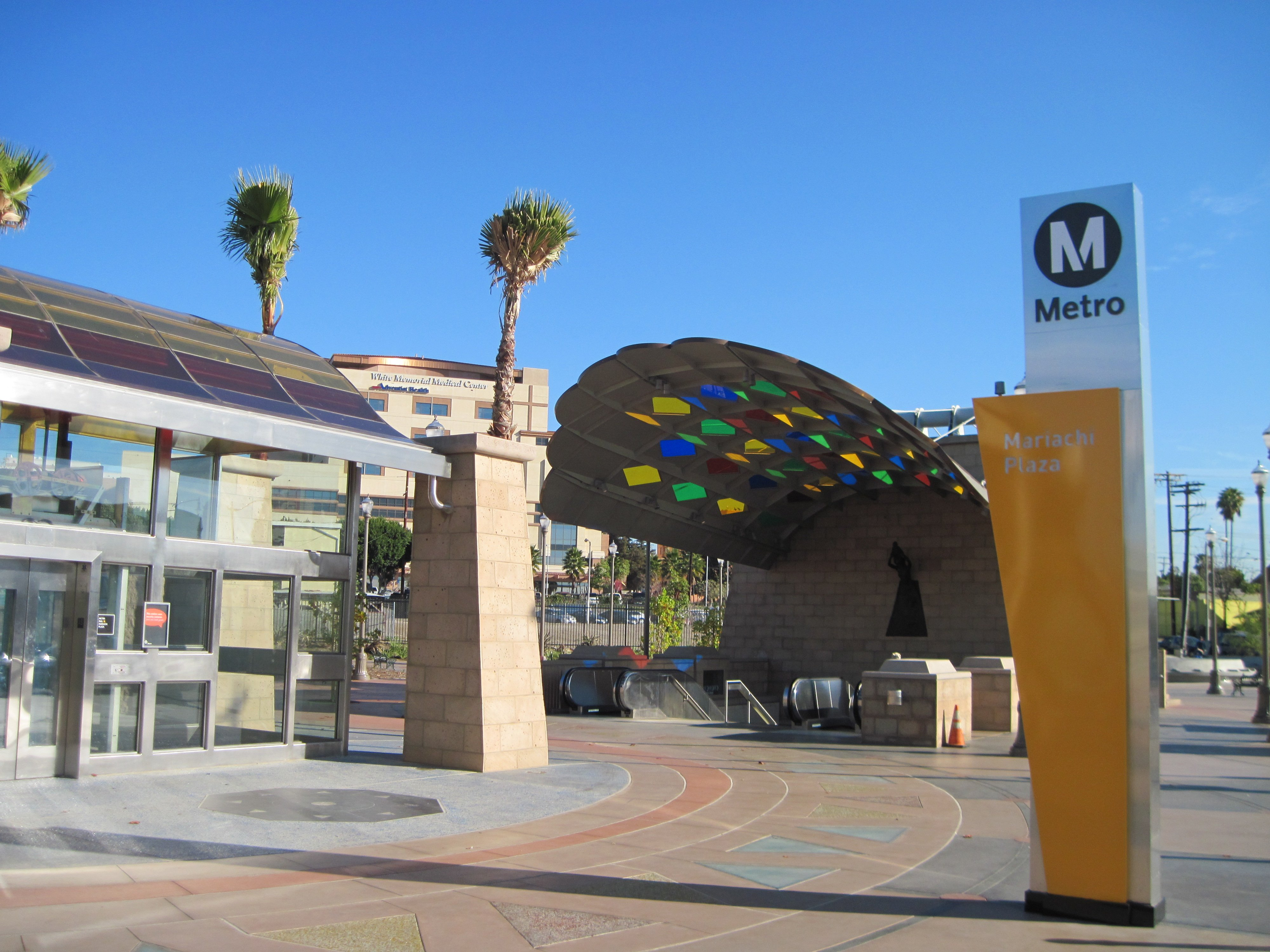
L Line Mariachi Plaza Station, 2009

The Los Angeles County Metropolitan Transportation Authority opened a light rail subway station under the plaza in 2009 as part of the Eastside extension of the Gold Line. The plaza provides a direct route to Downtown Los Angeles and connections to other Metro lines. As of 2020, there is a proposal to redevelop the square, which has sparked considerable controversy among local residents and mariachis. The station is currently served by the E Line following the opening of the Regional Connector on June 16, 2023.

=== Art and Design at Mariachi Plaza Metro Station ===
Metro's Mariachi Plaza Station, part of the Gold Line Eastside Extension, made its debut in 2009. This station's entrance is situated at what many consider the heart of the community. Its distinctive scalloped canopy features diamond-shaped glass cutouts that cast vibrant, festive colors onto the escalators below.

Beneath this canopy stands the bronze sculpture titled El Niño Perdido, a creation by Alejandro de la Loza, an artist born in Mexico City and raised in Boyle Heights. When conceptualizing this piece, Loza drew inspiration from the beloved Mexican instrumental song 'El Niño Perdido' (the lost child). A favorite among mariachis, this century-old composition revolves around two trumpeters playing at a distance from one another, with one symbolizing a parent and the other representing a lost child. As the song concludes, the two trumpeters often meet face-to-face, signifying the heartwarming reunion of parent and child.

Lucha Reyes, whose real name was Maria de Luz Flores Aceves, has a statue in the plaza. She visited the city many times during her career and is affectionately known as The Mother of Ranchera Music. Her statue stands behind the kiosk, serving as a muse for the local mariachis

Artist Juan Solis, born in Zacatecas, Mexico and raised in East Los Angeles was commissioned to paint two large panel murals. He painted figures of men and women in traditional folkloric dress, representing the cultural heritage of Mexico's various regions. On the second mural, he painted a mural of Our Lady of Guadalupe.

== In popular culture ==
Due to its rich musical history, several music videos have been filmed at Mariachi Plaza. These include the music videos for Lupita Infante's Cucurrucucú Paloma, La Santa Cecilia's Calaverita, Loona's "Butterfly", and Beatriz Gonzalez's "Los Laureles".

A Season 4 episode of Agents of S.H.I.E.L.D. was filmed at Mariachi Plaza, and the film "How to Be a Latin Lover" was partially shot there. Mariachi Plaza also serves as a significant setting in Michael Connelly's crime thriller novel The Burning Room, which focuses on a murder that takes place at the plaza.

The short documentary "Mariachi: A Tale of Three Lives," produced by KCET-TV, featured Mariachi Plaza and stars figures like Jose Hernandez and El Cochero's son, Aguja."
