= 1st Street (Los Angeles) =

Street in Los Angeles County, California, United States

- Maintained by: LACPDW
- Location: Los Angeles County, California, United States
- West end: Croft Avenue in Beverly Grove
- Major junctions: Fairfax Avenue at the Beverly Grove–Fairfax neighborhood line; Dead end in Fairfax; Dead end in Hancock Park; Arden Boulevard at the Fairfax–Windsor Square neighborhood line; US 101 in Boyle Heights
- East end: SR 60 in Monterey Park

1st Street is an east–west thoroughfare in Los Angeles, East Los Angeles, and Monterey Park in California, United States. It serves as a postal divider between north and south and is one of a few streets to run across the Los Angeles River. Though it serves as a major road east of downtown Los Angeles, it is a mostly residential street to the west.

For over a mile between Hoover Street and Glendale Boulevard, 1st Street is synonymous with Beverly Boulevard.

== Transportation ==
The E Line runs on east 1st Street between Alameda and Indiana Streets; it operates the Little Tokyo/Arts District, Pico/Aliso, Mariachi Plaza, Soto and Indiana stations. Metro Local line 14 runs through west 1st Street and Metro Local line 106 through East 1st Street. There's also another Metro Rail station at Hill Street which is Civic Center/Grand Park, served by Metro's B and D lines.

== Film history ==
First Street was a location background filmed during the movie Blood In Blood Out (originally: Bound by Honor).

The First Street bridge was used as the backdrop for Welsh rock band Lostprophets’ second album Start Something in 2004.

== Downtown bridges ==
In the book Down by the Los Angeles River, written by Joe Linton, the author narrates a walking path starting from First Street Bridge. LA voters in 1924 passed the Viaduct Bond Act, which would allocate $2 million through a tax, and the funds allocated would go toward revitalizing the Downtown Los Angeles bridges. The friends of the Los Angeles River mobilized the La Gran Limpieza to clean up the Los Angeles River with an educational feature where they invited elementary, middle, and high school students. A collaboration the friends of the Los Angeles had was with the Los Angeles Conservation Corps’ Clean & Green program that monitored the water quality at the rivers monthly. Under their collaborated event efforts, activities included cleaning up trash, science experiments, educational workshop, and familiarizing participants with the Los Angeles River bridges themselves since events would be facilitated there to create community identity.

== Notable landmarks ==
- Monterey Park Village (eastern terminus)
- Beverly Center (western terminus)
- CBS West Coast Headquarters
- Disney Concert Hall
- Grand Park
- Los Angeles City Hall
- Caltrans District 7 Headquarters
- Little Tokyo
- Mariachi Plaza
- Los Angeles Hompa Hongwanji Buddhist Temple
- The intersection of East 1st and Chicago streets in Boyle Heights is named Dolores Huerta Square.

== Gallery ==
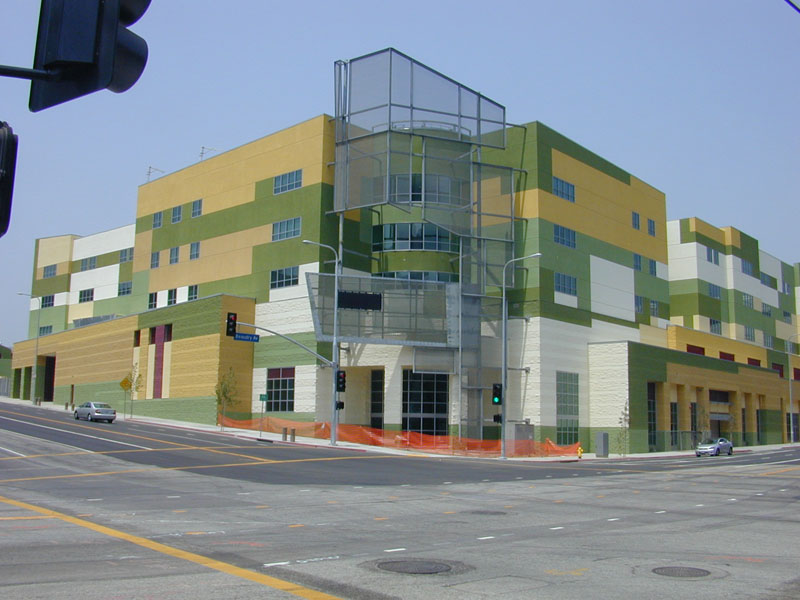
Edward R. Roybal Learning Center in Downtown Los Angeles

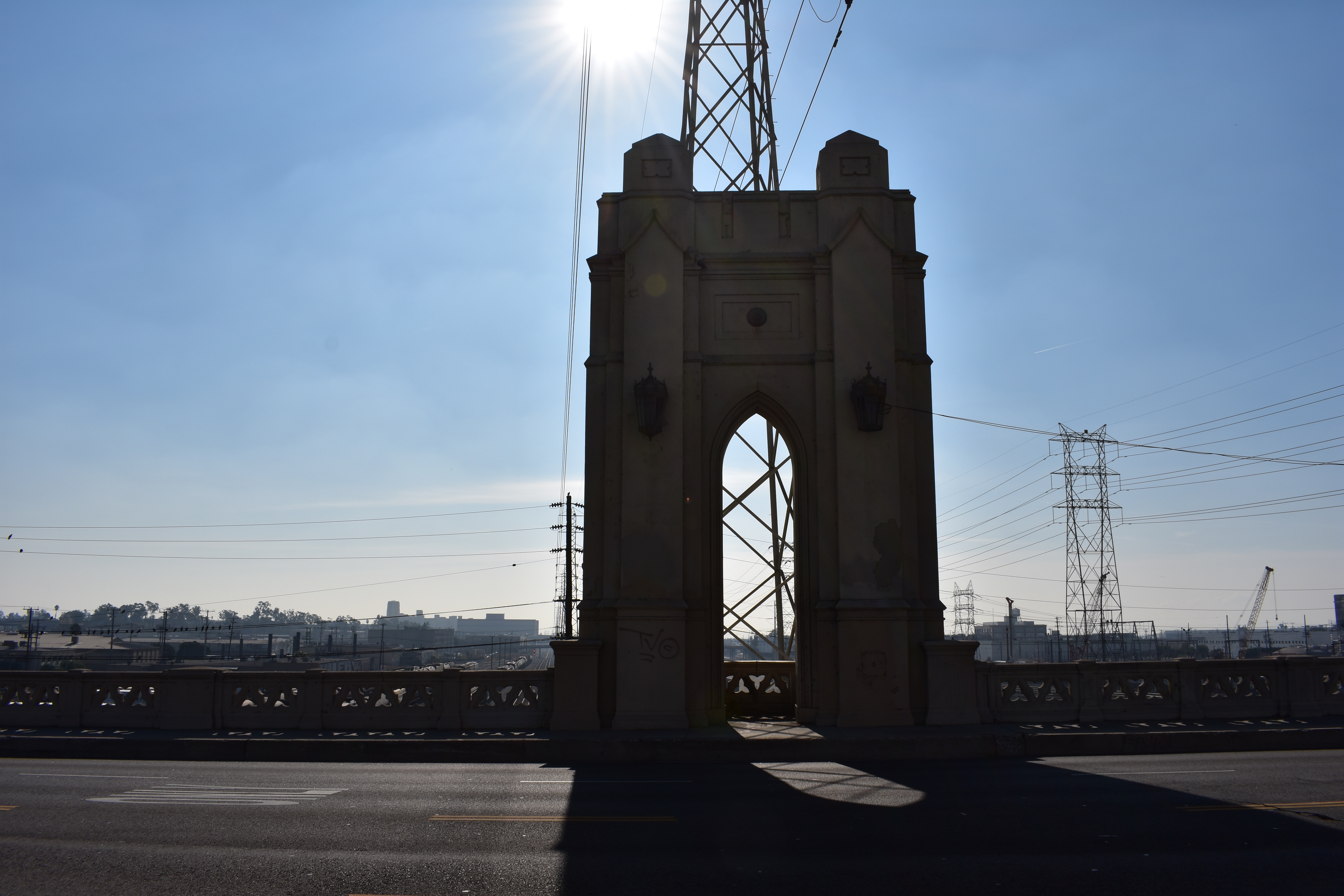
Perspective of being on the First Street Bridge

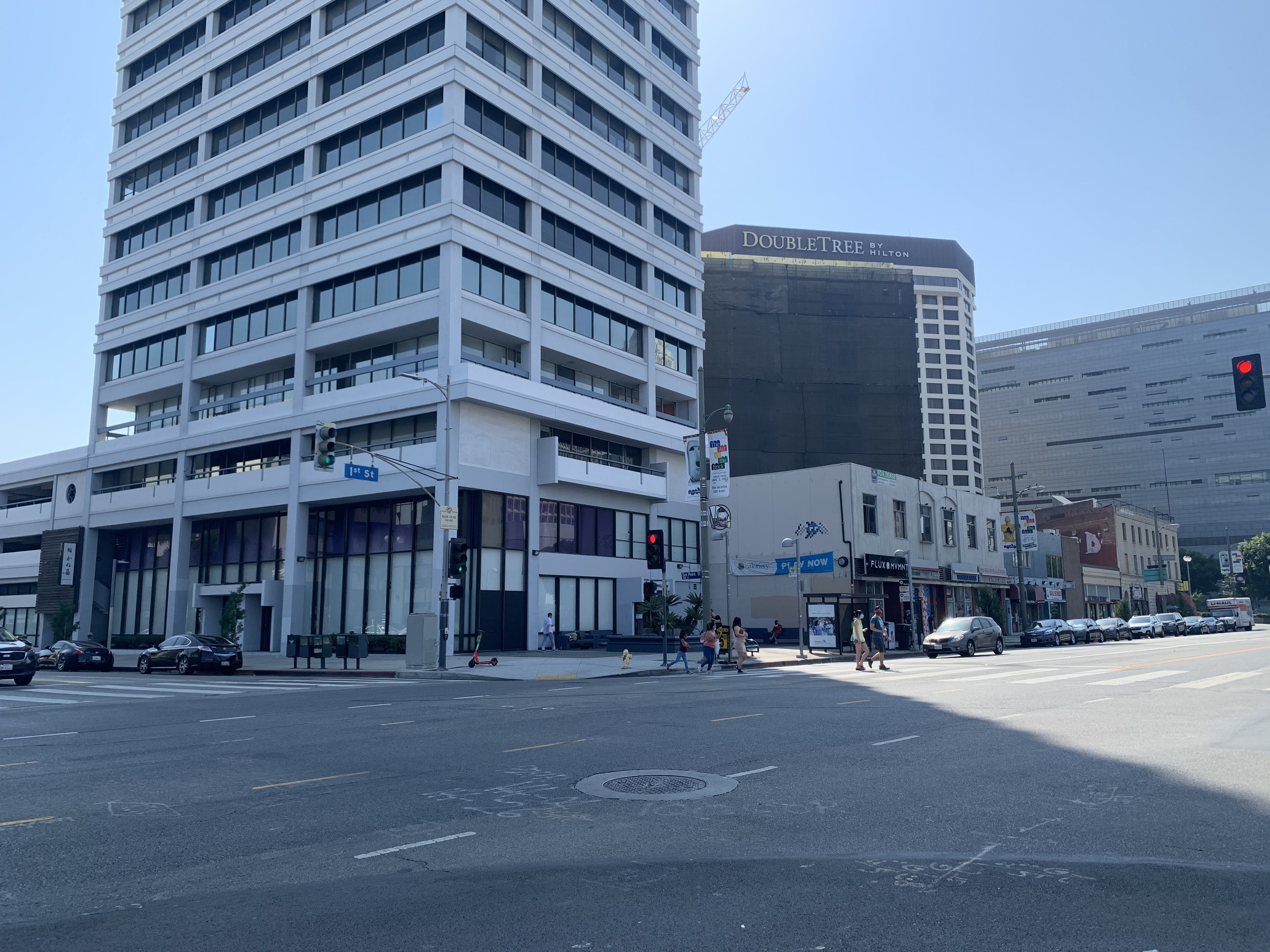
View of the intersection between 1st Street and San Pedro Street

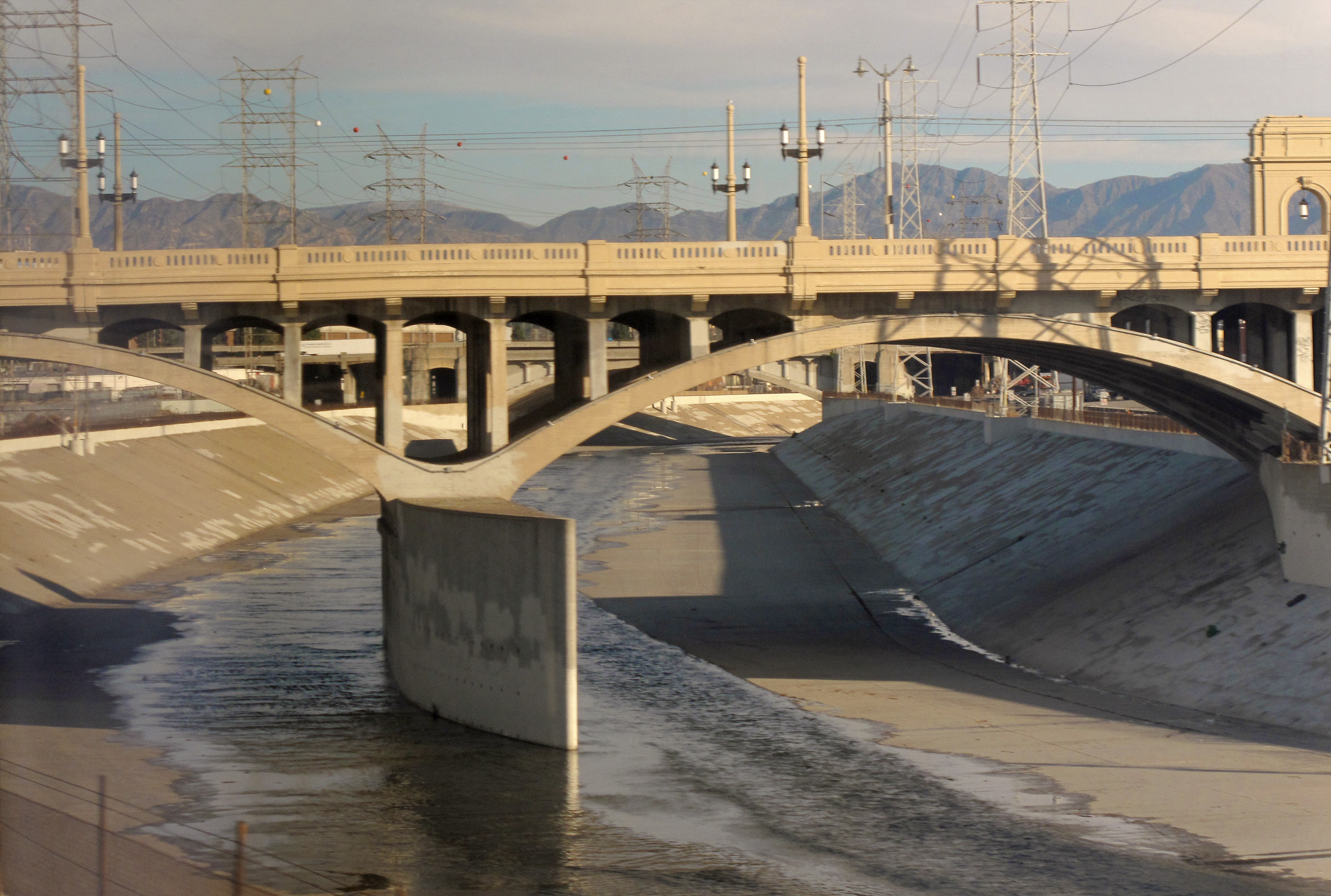
First Street Bridge over the LA River

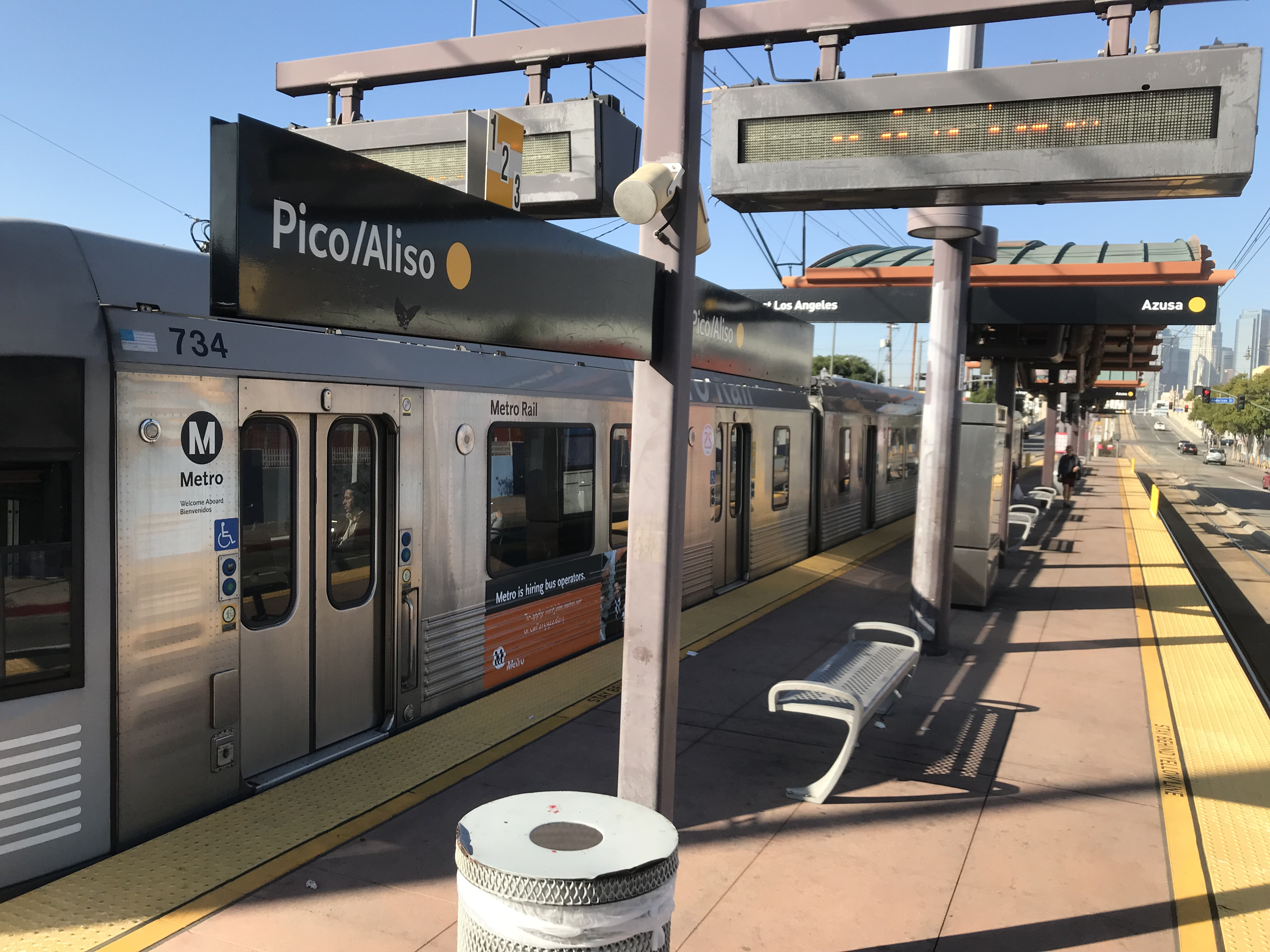
Pico/Aliso Station on 1st street

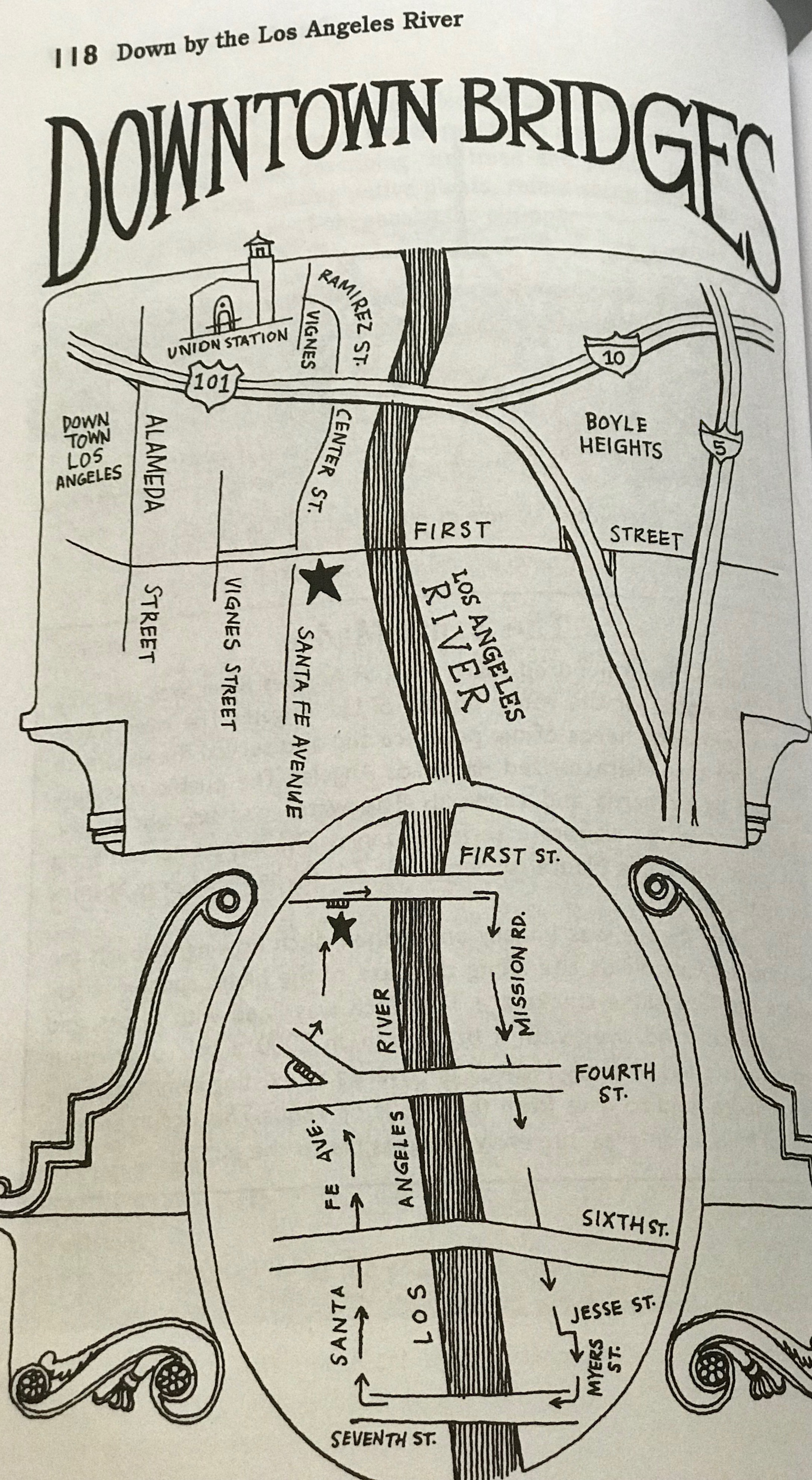
Bridges of the Los Angeles River in Downtown
