= Mariachi Plaza station =

Los Angeles Metro Rail station

Mariachi Plaza
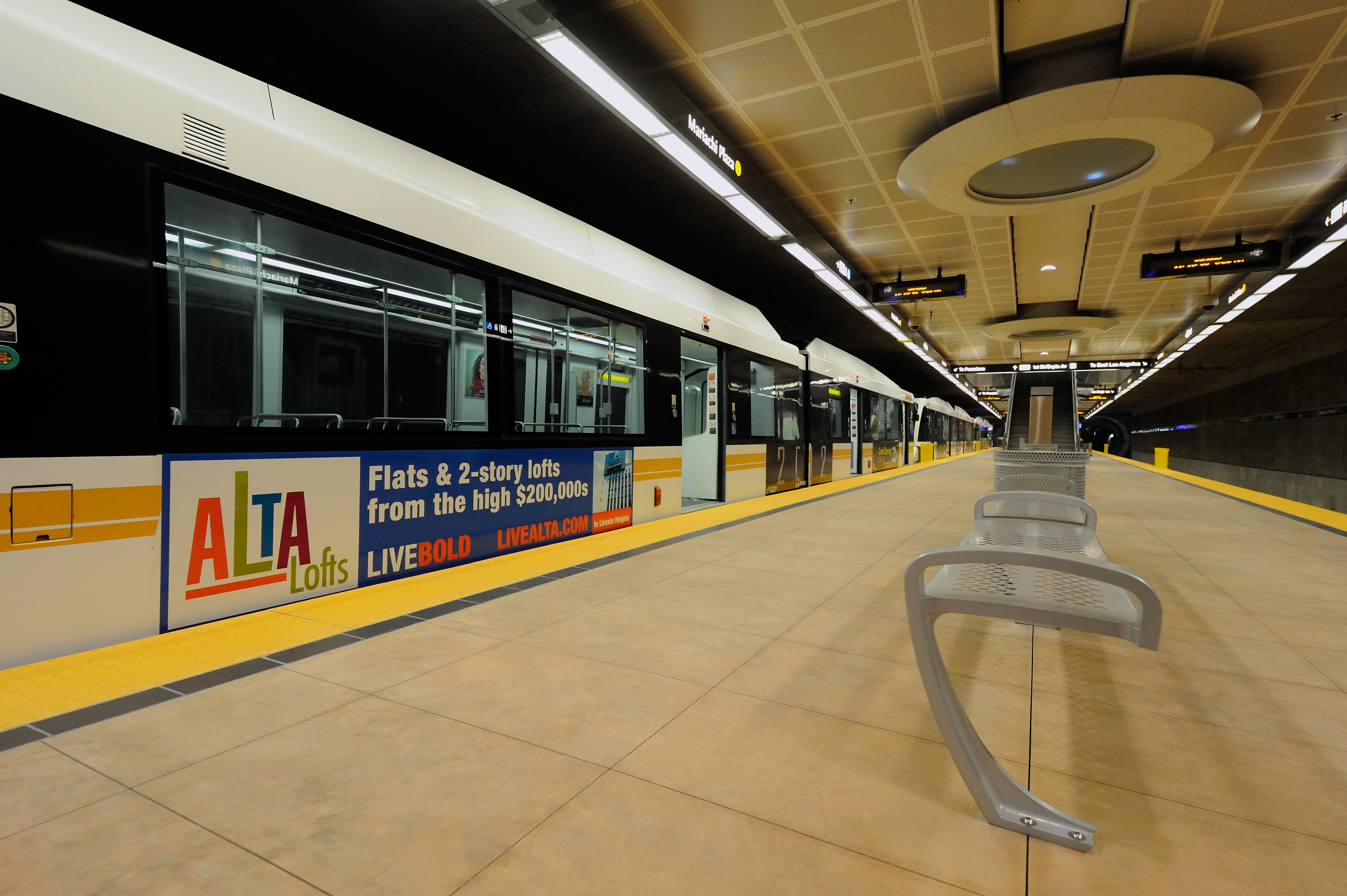
- Mariachi Plaza station platform

General information
- Location: 1831 East 1st Street; Los Angeles, California
- Coordinates: 34.0473°N 118.2198°W
- Owner: Los Angeles County Metropolitan Transportation Authority
- Platforms: 1 island platform
- Tracks: 2
- Connections: Los Angeles Metro Bus

Construction
- Structure type: Underground
- Cycle facilities: Racks and lockers
- Accessible: Yes

History
- Opened: November 15, 2009
- Former names: Mariachi Plaza/Boyle Heights

Passengers
- FY 2025: 548 (avg. wkdy boardings)

Services
Preceding station	Metro Rail	Following station
Pico/Aliso toward Santa Monica	E Line	Soto toward East LA
Former services
Preceding station	Metro Rail	Following station
Soto toward East Los Angeles	L Line	Pico/Aliso toward Azusa
Location

Mariachi Plaza station is an underground light rail station on the E Line of the Los Angeles Metro Rail system. It is located under 1st Street at the intersection of Boyle Avenue, with the main exit located at Mariachi Plaza, after which the station is named. The plaza is the historic gateway to the Boyle Heights neighborhood of Los Angeles. This station opened in 2009 as part of the Gold Line Eastside Extension and was one of two underground stations on the Eastside Extension (the other being Soto).

Until 1963, the Los Angeles Railway's P Line yellow streetcars operated on the surface of 1st Street, including a stop near this station.

== Service ==
=== Station layout ===
There are two levels underground: a mezzanine with ticket machines and gates, and below that, an island platform with two tracks. There is one entrance to the station at the intersection of 1st Street and Boyle Avenue, at the namesake Mariachi Plaza.

=== Hours and frequency ===
E Line service hours are from approximately 4:30 a.m. and 11:45 p.m daily. Trains operate every 8 minutes during peak hours, Monday to Friday. Trains run every 10 minutes, during midday on weekdays and weekends, from 9:00 a.m. to 7:00 p.m. Night and early morning service is approximately every 20 minutes every day.

=== Connections ===
As of December 15, 2024, the following connections are available:

- Los Angeles Metro Bus: 106

== Notable places nearby ==
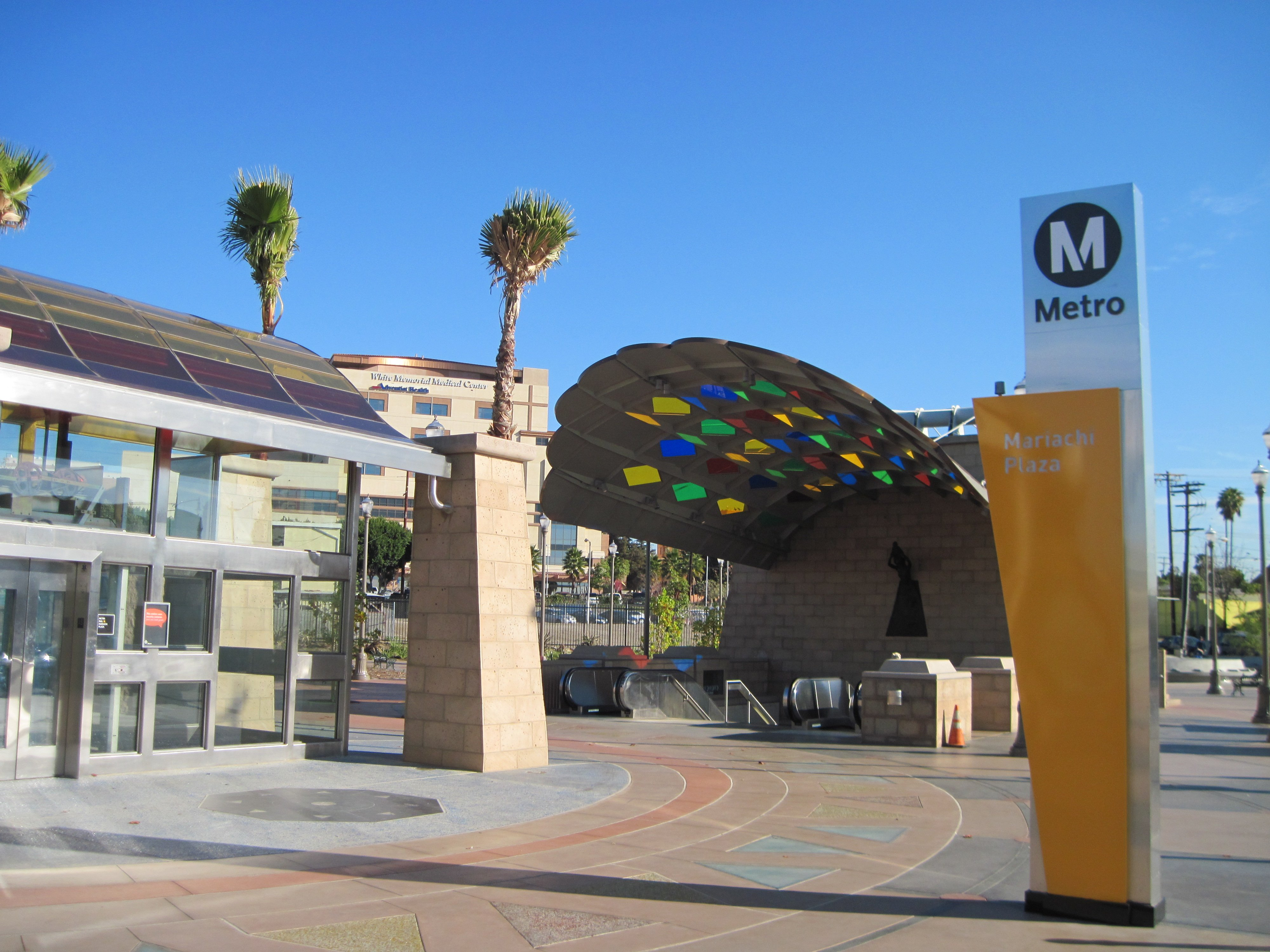
Mariachi Plaza station entrance

The station is within walking distance of the following notable places:

- Hollenbeck Park
- Mariachi Plaza
- White Memorial Medical Center
