= Soto station =

Los Angeles Metro Rail station

Soto
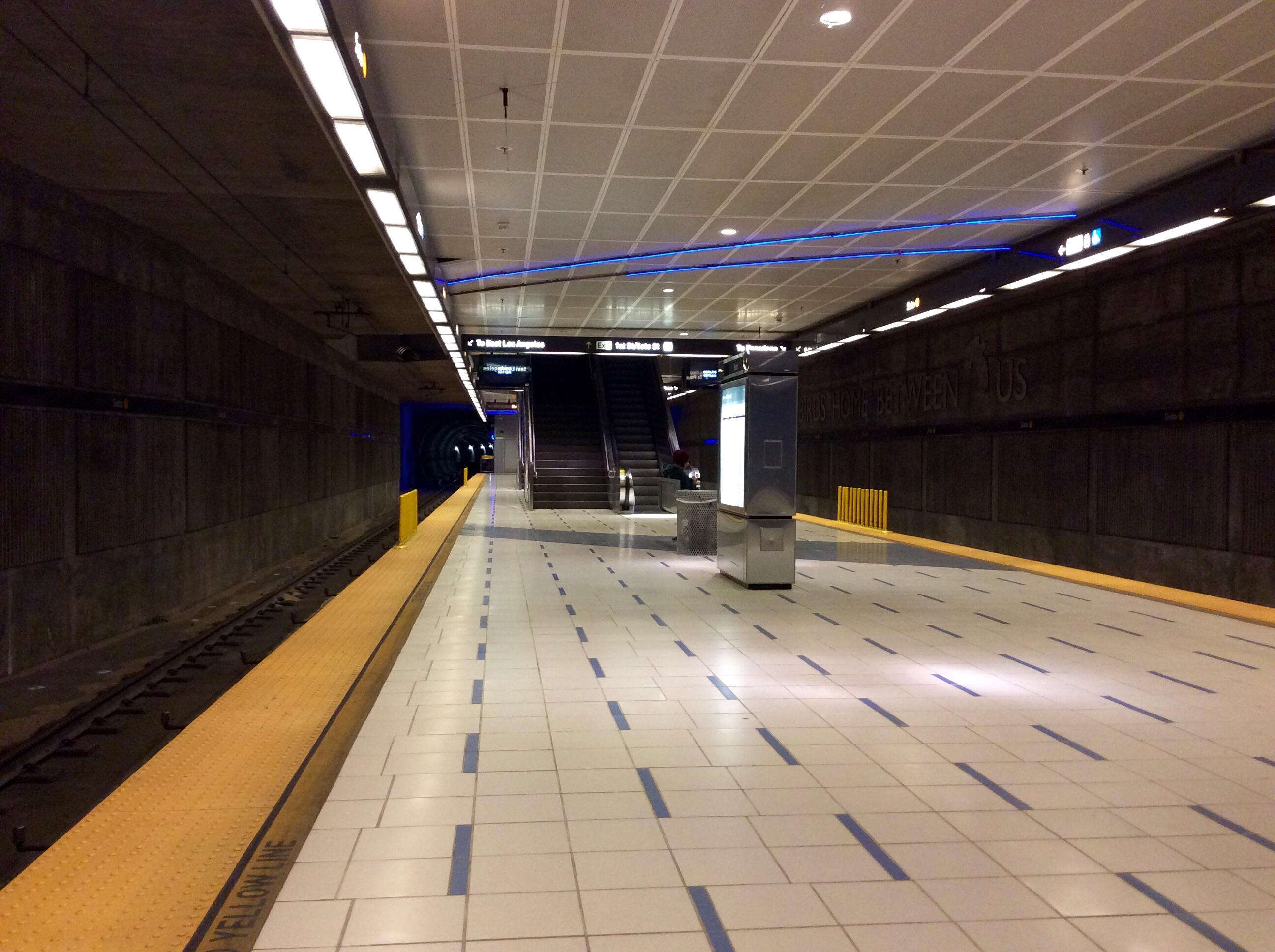
- Soto station platform

General information
- Location: 2330 East 1st Street; Los Angeles, California
- Coordinates: 34.0440°N 118.2106°W
- Owner: Los Angeles County Metropolitan Transportation Authority
- Platforms: 1 island platform
- Tracks: 2
- Connections: Los Angeles Metro Bus

Construction
- Structure type: Underground
- Cycle facilities: Racks and lockers
- Accessible: Yes

History
- Opened: November 15, 2009

Passengers
- FY 2025: 1,207 (avg. wkdy boardings)

Services
Preceding station	Metro Rail	Following station
Mariachi Plaza toward Santa Monica	E Line	Indiana toward East LA
Former services
Preceding station	Metro Rail	Following station
Indiana toward East Los Angeles	L Line	Mariachi Plaza toward Azusa
Location

Soto station is an underground light rail station on the E Line of the Los Angeles Metro Rail system. It is located underneath 1st Street at its intersection with Soto Street in the heart of the Boyle Heights neighborhood of Los Angeles. This station opened in 2009 as part of the Gold Line Eastside Extension and was one of two underground stations on the Eastside Extension (the other being Mariachi Plaza).

== Service ==
=== Station layout ===
There are two levels underground: a mezzanine with ticket machines and gates, and below that, an island platform with two tracks. There is one entrance to the station located at the intersection of 1st Street and South Soto Street.

=== Hours and frequency ===
E Line service hours are from approximately 4:30 a.m. and 11:45 p.m daily. Trains operate every 8 minutes during peak hours, Monday to Friday. Trains run every 10 minutes, during midday on weekdays and weekends, from 9:00 a.m. to 7:00 p.m. Night and early morning service is approximately every 20 minutes every day.

=== Connections ===
As of December 15, 2024, the following connections are available:

- Los Angeles Metro Bus: 106, 251, 605

== Points of Interest ==
The station is walkable to one of the last Pioneer Chicken restaurants in the LA Region, a former chain known for a distinctive breading and unique menu options such as gizzards. In addition, the Evergreen Cemetery interns a number of historically significant figures from the Los Angeles pioneer era. Hollenbeck Park is a historic public park designed in late Victorian style.
