= Tuesday Night Cafe =

Tuesday Night Cafe is an Asian American public arts and performance series in Los Angeles founded in 1999. The show features a curated program of visual and performing artists, which has included slam poet Beau Sia, comedian Anna Akana, and J-pop musician Kat McDowell.

Tuesday Night Cafe was created to bring together artists from the Asian-Pacific Islander in Los Angeles. Its predecessor, Art Attack, was held once a year in Historic Filipinotown and has since expanded to run on the first and third Tuesday of each month, April through October, in the Aratani Courtyard at Union Center for the Arts in Little Tokyo. Tuesday Night Cafe has been described as a "community fiercely devoted to creating venues where art and community connect".
