= Sustainable Little Tokyo =

Arts and cultural community organization

In 2013, Little Tokyo created the arts and cultural organization, Sustainable Little Tokyo, as a community who aims to re-identify and reignite the Japanese culture within a foreign land. Because of the potential threats of gentrification developing within downtown Los Angeles, California, specifically within Alameda Street, 3rd Street, and 1st Street, SLT was created to prevent any injustice to citizens due to city management over their land: including LA Metro’s train station area, the Mangrove block to the east, and the First Street North block to the north of the station. SLT intended to call for action and gain little help from the Japanese-American community who has been affected by the gentrification.

== Biography ==
=== The Demographic ===
Located in downtown Los Angeles, Sustainable Little Tokyo holds a rich cultural heritage and a diverse demographic profile. As of 2010, more than 25% of Little Tokyo’s population was 65 years of age, or older. Between 1990 and 2010, the residents ages 45 and 64 increased by 14.7%. During this period, the percentage of residents ages 24 to 44 decreased by 15.4%. According to data collected in 2022, the population of Little Tokyo stands around 4,000 people.

The aging population of Little Tokyo faces unique challenges, including linguistic barriers, and social isolation, with over 50% of seniors who are not proficient in English, and 70% living alone.

The greatest demographic group within Little Tokyo residents, specifically between Alameda Street, 3rd Street, and 1st Street are threatened by gentrification. This demographic group consists of Asia, while the second largest group is African American, with a significant population increase between 1990 and 2000. As of 2010, the population proportions stood with 39.6% of the population being Asian, 25.9% Black, 19.5% Hispanic, and 19.5% White.

Within the Asian community of Little Tokyo, the majority Country of Origin is Japan, followed by Korea and China.

=== The Purpose ===
Sustainable Little Tokyo (SLT) aims to resist gentrification while maintaining eco-friendly practices. As a community-driven organization, SLT emphasizes the importance of maintaining a strong connection to their culture, despite inhabiting in America.

SLT reinforces the process of remaining environmentally conscious and supports small businesses within the area. A phrase that is used often in regards to SLT, “mottainai!”, comes from the Buddhist ideology to avoid being wasteful; to be conscious of what is and is not being used or re-used

While SLT facilitates sustainable practices, through “mottainai”, they reinstate the necessity to belong, or to feel a sense of belonging. “Ibasho”, which is a Japanese word that invokes the feeling of being “at home” or feeling an opportunity to connect, is a key process for SLT to build connections between marginalized Asian communities, the working class and the land they inhabit.

== Contributors ==
=== Internal Staff ===
Sustainable Little Tokyo, many marginalized group of people called this place home and promote sense of belonging. They are spiritual live in the town that represent the culture centre for diversity of people as well as the Japanese Americans in the U.S., Southern California. The lead former for the SLT is Scott Oshima, who received the BFA in photography and Media from the California Institute of the Arts.

External contributors

SLT has been receiving support since its beginning. The organization, grown from the Little Tokyo Community Council and the Japanese American Cultural & Community, continues to be fundamental foundations of SLT.

Other external organizations contribute resources to support SLT:

- Natural Resources Defense Council
- Low Income Investment Fund
- Local Initiatives Support Corporation
- Enterprise Community Partners
- Global Green
- NeighborWorks America
- Mithun

== Notable Events ==
Over the years, Sustainable Little Tokyo has organized and participated in numerous events that reflect their commitment to the goals of environmental sustainability, cultural preservation, and economic vitality.

Takachizu was the first major art project by SLT. Led by the artists Rosten Woo and Maya Santos, the goal was to create asset maps of cultural treasures. Within Little Tokyo, stands two 150-year-old grapefruit trees. The most notable of the two, Sunny, located in the corner of the Japanese American Cultural & Community Center (JACCC), is one of the many treasures in Takachizu and Sustainable Little Tokyo.

In 2015, JACCC held an art event in honour of the two grapefruit trees, as well as the Aoyama tree - another historic landmark. This art happening celebrated the longevity of Little Tokyo's historic trees.

Windows of Little Bronze Tokyo:

Built on past iterations of Windows Exhibitions, “Little Bronze Tokyo” was a windows exhibition series representing the connections between neighborhoods. This exhibition reflected the dreams of solidarity between cultures of the past, present, and future. “Little Bronze Tokyo” was a term for the neighborhood. Given during the transition between Bronzevill and Little Tokyo, this term represents the boundaries of what is considered Little Tokyo. The Windows of Little Bronze Tokyo commissioned five local artists : Carey Westbrook, Miki Yokoyama, Ayumi Chisolm, Bobby Buck, and Wayne Hoggatt.

== History (+ the challenges) ==
=== Past ===
Sustainable Little Tokyo originated as an organization within Little Tokyo. Within downtown Los Angeles, the city in California holds an over 150 years old Grapefruit Tree called Sunny. Sunny carries significant value and is in SLT's archive, Takachizu. Sunny was previously taken care of by Tongva, an Indigenous community who have existed for almost ten thousand years.

In 1769, the Tongva people and their land was taken over by the Spanish. In result, the Tongva culture and worldview is completely colonized, enslaved and mistreated. In 1822, Mexico regained their independence from Spain and sold Indigenous groups, including the Tongva group. The Tongva people and land were sold to Yaanga, which is now known as Little Tokyo. This transition led to more displacement in following years. In 1848, the United States settled over California. Tongva, alongside many other surviving Indigenous groups, were sold and enslaved to through the law called Antivagrancy Ordinance.

=== Present ===
Today, Sustainable Little Tokyo has reached significant milestones in promoting environmental sustainability, cultural preservation, and community engagement within the neighbourhood.

1. Community Visioning In 2013, Sustainable Little Tokyo initiated a community-driven visioning process. In a three-day series of meetings, over 150 people met with experts in design, transit, green technology, and economics. This collaborative effort aimed towards creating a sustainable development plan. Topics addressed included community identity, community culture, urban design, and mobility and linkages.

2. Collaborative Development Projects In collaboration with organizations such as the Little Tokyo Service Center, and the Go For Broke National Education Center, Sustainable little Tokyo has engaged on a mixed-use building. These collaborations aim to preserve the character of the neighbourhood while continuing to provide affordable housing and community spaces.

Sustainable Little Tokyo also faces several pressing challenges as it strives to preserve the cultural, economic, and environmental stability of the Los Angeles neighbourhood. One of these challenges surrounds gentrification and rising rents. In May 2024, Little Tokyo was named in the year's list of endangered historic places. The influx and development of chain businesses have damaged the neighbourhood's character while increasing rent rates, therefore threatening establishments. The Little Tokyo Service Center has been working to ensure the support of small businesses within the neighbourhood, along with houses of worship, nonprofits, and residential communities.

=== Future (vision & goals) ===
Through arts and cultural events, Sustainable Little Tokyo utilizes the voice of the community to establish and encourage cultural growth within the neighbourhood. SLT promotes anti-gentrification through protests and activism through sustainable and artistic methods.

SLT has a commitment to evolve the Little Tokyo neighbourhood through environmentally aware practices while resisting gentrification. SLT maintains a strong connection with the Japanese-American community. Moving forward, they aim to continue supporting their external contributors and integrating these partnerships into their decision-making process. This includes collaborations with:

- Japanese American Cultural Community Center
- Japanese American National Museum
- Union Center for the Arts
