= Julius Goldwater =

American Buddhist clergyman

Julius A. Goldwater (9 February 1908 – 11 June 2001) was an American Buddhist clergyman noted for his services to Japanese Americans during the period of internment during World War II.

== Early life ==
Goldwater was born in Los Angeles to Benjamin Goldwater and Ray Etta (née Michaels). His family, who originally spelled their name Goldwasser, were prosperous merchants of Polish and German Jewish descent who came to California with the Gold Rush and established Goldwater's department store. Julius was a first cousin of Barry Goldwater, who would later be a five-term U.S. senator for Arizona and the Republican candidate for president in 1964.

Goldwater's mother intended for him to become an observant Jew, but she died when he was two years old, and his brief stint in Jewish Sunday school "didn't take". As a teenager he was fascinated by diverse strains of spirituality, including Sufism, the occultism of Manly P. Hall, Advaita Vedanta, and the Pentecostal revivals of Aimee Semple McPherson.

== Discovery of Buddhism ==
Though curious about Eastern religion, Goldwater paid little attention to Buddhism until he and his father relocated to Hawaii in the 1920s. Here he encountered Buddhist teachers including the British convert Ernest Shinkaku Hunt, the Japanese bishop Yemyo Imamura, and the Chinese monk Taixu. Ernest Hunt made a particularly strong impression on Goldwater, telling him that Buddhism was "self-validating as you go along", unlike religions which required blind faith. Goldwater took refuge in Honolulu in 1928, becoming one of the earliest Jewish Buddhists in the United States.

He married Pearl Wicker, a Lutheran, in a Jodo Shinshu ceremony in Hawaii. They would remain married for the next seven decades.

After returning to California he was a member of a Jodo Shinshu temple in Little Tokyo, Los Angeles. He was popular with Nisei youth, organizing novel activities like dances. The Issei priests felt that he could play a valuable role in encouraging Nisei to regard Buddhism as compatible with American identity. Though not personally eager to become a priest, he felt obligated to meet the need of the community, and therefore in the 1930s he went to Japan to seek ordination as a Jodo Shinshu priest. He was ordained in another lineage in Hangzhou, China, spent time at a monastery, and received the Dharma name "Subhadra".

== Ministry to internees ==
When the United States declared war on Japan and president Franklin D. Roosevelt ordered the evacuation of Japanese-Americans from the West Coast, Goldwater was one of the few Buddhist priests in Los Angeles who was not interned. He helped to collect and safeguard the personal possessions of internees, prevented their homes from being illegally sold, and saw to the protection and upkeep of several Buddhist temples in the Los Angeles area, including Hompa Hongwanji.

Over the course of the war he made trips in his "snappy Chrysler" to all ten internment camps, some on multiple occasions, bringing Buddhist study materials, rosaries, butsudans, and creature comforts like candy and coffee. He financed these activities out of his own pocket; as a scion of the Goldwater fortune, he had a trust fund to draw upon. His services to the interned Japanese-Americans did not endear him to some of his fellow Angelenos, who regarded him as a "Jap-lover" and vandalized his home.

Goldwater established the Buddhist Brotherhood of America to print and disseminate nonsectarian Buddhist literature, including hymns set to the tune of Protestant hymns which Goldwater had first heard at Aimee Semple McPherson's Pentecostal revivals. He believed that in order for Buddhism to survive in America, it would need to assimilate and adopt more American trappings. In 1944, he persuaded the Buddhist Mission of North America to rebrand itself as the Buddhist Churches of America.

== Post-war ==
After the end of internment, Goldwater established two hostels for people returning from the camps, whom he also helped to find permanent lodgings and employment. He sometimes lent his personal car to former internees who were in need of transportation.

Goldwater was beloved by the former internees, some of whom sent him money long after the war. He rejected the idea that his actions were heroic, declaring in 1992, "I only behaved as any American would have done."

In his ministry Goldwater took an ecumenist and pan-Buddhist approach, and despite serving as a Jodo Shinshu clergyman, his private spiritual practice was eclectic and non-sectarian. He did not practice the nembutsu which is central to Pure Land practice. In keeping with what he had been told by Rev. Ernest Hunt in Hawaii, he did not regard Buddhism as a faith-centered religion, but rather as a path of personal experience and self-verification. He was critical of post-war popularizers of Buddhism such as Alan Watts and the Beat Generation, whose use of drugs he deplored. Goldwater had one apprentice, the late Rev. Arthur Takemoto, and one dharma heir disciple, Orrin Ezralow (Padmapani).

Goldwater died on 11 June 2001 at the age of 93, and was survived by Pearl, his wife of 71 years. He was believed to be the oldest living Western convert to Buddhism.
