= Boyle Hotel – Cummings Block =

- Boyle Hotel-Hotel Cummings
- U.S. National Register of Historic Places
- Los Angeles Historic-Cultural Monument
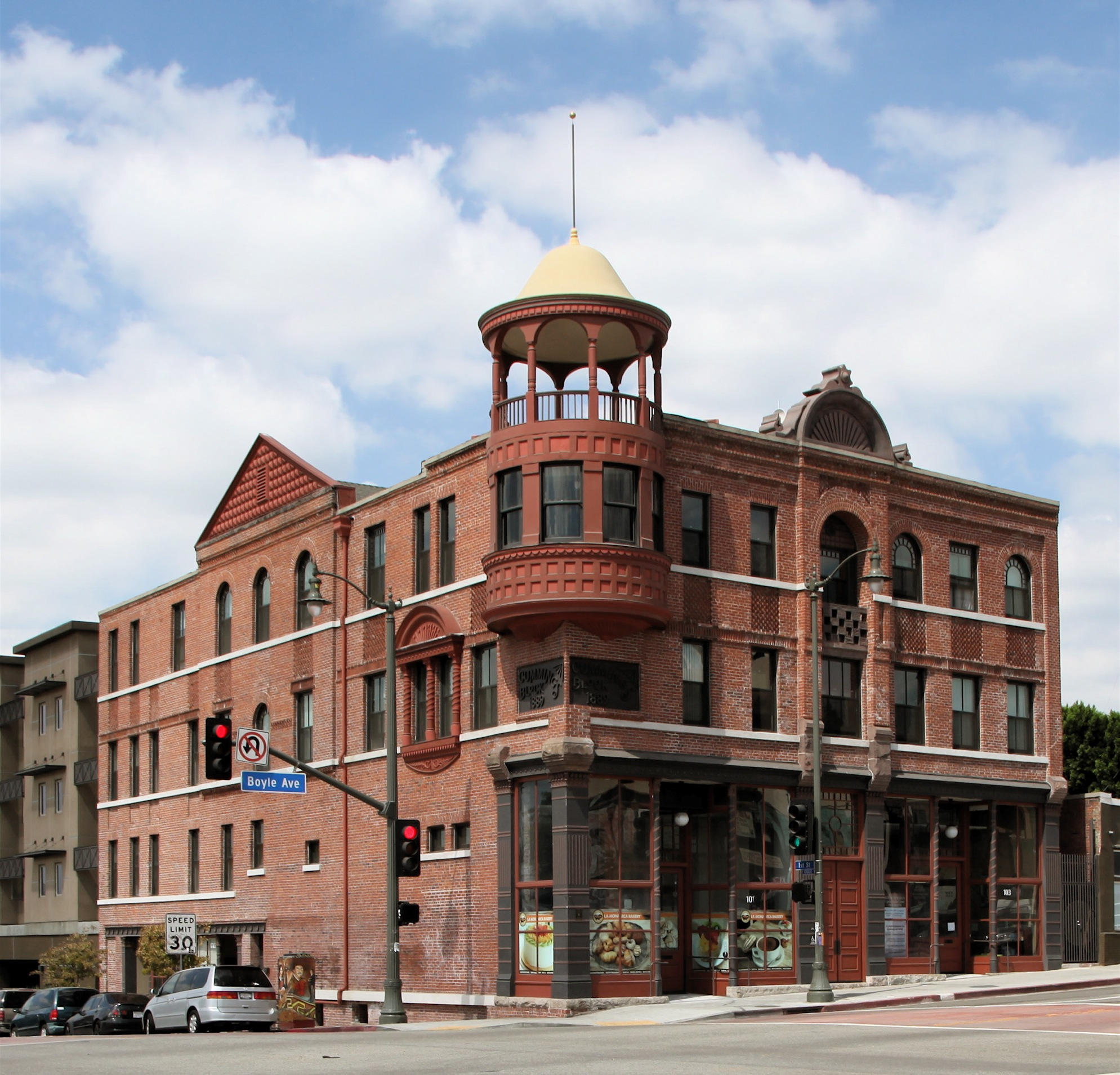

- Location within the Los Angeles metropolitan area Location within the United States
- Location: 101-105 North Boyle Avenue
- Coordinates: 34.047367°N 118.220051°W
- Built: 1889
- Architect: W. R. Norton
- Architectural style: Queen Anne
- NRHP reference No.: 71000159
- LAHCM No.: 891

Significant dates
- Added to NRHP: July 23, 2013
- Designated LAHCM: October 24, 2007

The historic 1889 Boyle Hotel is across the street from the Mariachi Plaza at the corner of Boyle Avenue, First Street and Pleasant Avenue in the East Los Angeles community of Boyle Heights. The building was formerly a hotel and commercial shops line the first floor of this Queen Anne Style building. In 2007 the building was declared a Los Angeles Cultural Monument.

The building was rehabilitated by East LA Community Corporation as affordable housing. Ernesto Espinoza is the Director of Real Estate Development for East LA Community Corporation who helped line up the $25 million in public and private subsidies to develop 51 units of affordable housing at the Boyle Hotel – Cummings Block and adjacent parcels. ELACC added a new 20-unit apartment building adjacent to the Boyle Hotel on the Cummings Block.

== See also ==
- List of Los Angeles Historic-Cultural Monuments on the East and Northeast Sides
