= Los Angeles Hompa Hongwanji Buddhist Temple =

Buddhist temple in Los Angeles, California

Los Angeles Hompa Hongwanji Buddhist Temple (third location)
- Temple entrance, 2023

- Location within the Los Angeles metropolitan area

General information
- Location: 815 East First Street, Los Angeles CA 90012
- Coordinates: 34.04915°N 118.23424°W
- Construction started: October 14, 1968
- Opened: 1969
- Inaugurated: November 16, 1969
- Cost: $1.025 million

Design and construction
- Architect: Tom Makino

Website
- www.nishihongwanji-la.org

Los Angeles Hompa Hongwanji Buddhist Temple, formerly Hongwanji Buddhist Church of Los Angeles, also known as Nishi Hongwanji Buddhist Temple and Nishi Hompa Hongwanji Los Angeles Betsuin, is a Japanese Buddhist temple located in Los Angeles, California. The temple's second location was the first Buddhist temple in Los Angeles, one of the biggest and most influential in the United States, and is both a Los Angeles Historic-Cultural Monument and a contributing property in the National Register of Historic Places-listed Little Tokyo Historic District.

== Organization ==
Los Angeles Hompa Hongwanji Buddhist Temple is part of the Jodo Shinshu Hongwanji-ha.

== History ==
In the early 1900s, Los Angeles County's Japanese population was estimated to be more than 15,000, located primarily around Little Tokyo. The first Japanese Buddhist group in the area was Rafu Bukkyokai in 1904, followed by Nanka Bukkyokai (Buddhist Association of Southern California) in 1905 and Chuo Bukkyokai in 1912. The groups soon began feuding, so Kyoto's Nishi Hongan-ji sent Reverend Shuye Sonoda to mediate. Sonda merged the three groups several months later, the merger officially ratified on September 30, 1917. The name of the merged group was Hongwanji Buddhist Church of Los Angeles and their reverend was Reverend Koyu Uchida from Nanka Bukkyokai. A merger ceremony was held on April. 17, 1920.

=== First location ===
Los Angeles Hompa Hongwanji Buddhist Temple was first located on the second floor of Yamato Hall on Jackson Street. The temple had more than 2,000 members in 1924.

=== Second location ===
- Los Angeles Hompa Hongwanji Buddhist Temple (second location)
- U.S. Historic district – Contributing property
- Los Angeles Historic-Cultural Monument
- The temple in 1986
- Location: 355–369 East First Street and 109–119 North Central Avenue, Los Angeles, California
- Built: 1925
- Architect: Edgar Cline
- Architectural style: Exotic Revival
- Part of: Little Tokyo Historic District (ID86001479)
- LAHCM No.: 313

Significant dates
- Designated CP: August 22, 1986
- Designated LAHCM: October 24, 1986

Los Angeles Hompa Hongwanji Buddhist Temple's second location, 355–369 East First Street and 109–119 North Central Avenue in downtown Los Angeles, was designed by local architect Edgar Cline and built at a cost of $185,000 in 1925 ($3.4 million in 2025). It was the first Buddhist Temple in Los Angeles, one of the largest and most influential in the United States, and was dedicated in a ceremony presided over by Lord Abbott Sonyu Ōtani with more than 1,000 in attendance on November 12, 1925. The temple was elevated to Betsuin status in 1931, the first temple in the mainland United States to do so.

The temple's assembly hall was a focal point for the neighborhood. Many cultural functions were held there, as were English language classes and the final round of the Japanese language schools oratorical competition. In 1934, the temple had 1,500 members and an operating budget of $14,000 ($336,940 in 2025).

In 1942, the temple was closed and the staff excepting Reverend Julius Goldwater were forced into internment camps. While closed, the temple stored its interned members' household goods; it also served as a hostel after the internments were lifted. The temple reopened on September 24, 1945 and had 2300 members in 1955.

The temple moved to a new location in 1969 and this building was sold to the City of Los Angeles in 1973. The building was listed as a contributing property in the National Register of Historic Places-listed Little Tokyo Historic District on August 22, 1986 and declared Los Angeles Historic Cultural Monument No. 313 on October 24 of that same year. The Japanese American National Museum moved into the building in 1992, and the following year, they received the National Preservation Honor Award for their work restoring the building.

==== Architecture and design ====
Los Angeles Hompa Hongwanji Buddhist Temple's second location features an eclectic East Asian Exotic Revival design that combines eastern and western architectural elements. The building consists of three sections that curve around a street corner, a portion of which is commercial space that is Vernacular in design and reminiscent of traditional architecture from the west. The temple's offices, located in the northern-most portion of the building, repeat the commercial space design.

The building's First Street facade curves around the corner of First Street and Central Avenue. It features common bond-laid dark red brick on its first and second stories, while the third story is finished in plaster scored to simulate stone. The facade is topped by narrow cornice and also features a stringcourse between the second and third stories. The first floor storefronts feature glass paneled doors, transom windows, and checkerboard bulkheads made of black and yellow tiles, while the second and third stories feature symmetrically spaced double hung windows. The west end of the facade also features an office entry with a terra cotta surround and a sword and shield ornament above it. Additionally, the building's corner storefront features a wood-framed glass door with geometric muntin patterns recessed between two free-standing pillars, side windows above checkered bulkheads pierced by metal lattice vents.

The south bay of the Central Avenue facade

The building's Central Avenue facade is framed by massive raised pylon-like bays that are faced by scored concrete. The temple entrance is in the south bay and features a large cement karahafu on elaborate brackets, replicating Nishi Hongan-ji's imperial gateway. Sawn wood ornaments are located on a beam under the karahafu, and above the karahafu is a window and geometric fretwork of muntins. The north bay contains the same window and muntins design; below this is a single narrow window and below that, a less elaborate ground-floor entrance that features a tapered, unadorned frame and extended lintel. Between these bays, the facade is articulated by four brick piers atop a one story brick base; each pier is two stories in height, has a patterned base and lotus-designed capital, features Egyptian motifs, and is set against a scored concrete surface. The facade's roofline features cavetto cornice and the center also features a patterned terra cotta parapet.

Inside, the temple's hondo was meant to be the largest in the area, and its decorations were meant to resemble Nijo Castle and Nishi Hongan-ji.

=== Current location ===
Motivated by rumors that the city was planning to widen First Street an amount that would cut into Los Angeles Hompa Hongwanji Buddhist Temple, the temple moved to a new location, 815 East First Street, in 1969. This building, designed by Tom Makino and built by Collins and McPherson, began construction on October 14, 1968 and was dedicated with more than 2,000 in attendance on November 16, 1969. The construction cost of $1.025 million ($9 million in 2025), paid for by 1,103 donors.

A Japanese garden was added to the temple complex in 1970, and multi-purpose hall was added in 1976. A large bell tower was dedicated on the temple's 75th anniversary in 1979.
