= Yiddishkayt (organization) =

- Founded: 1995
- Founder: Aaron Paley
- Type: 501(c)(3)
- Purpose: Yiddishkayt, Yiddish, Jewish history, Education, multiculturalism
- Location: Koreatown, Los Angeles, California
- Key people: Rob Adler Peckerar, Executive Director
- Website: yiddishkayt.org

Yiddishkayt is a Yiddish cultural and educational organization, based in Los Angeles, California. Its offices are located in the Pellissier Building above the Wiltern Theater in the Koreatown District of Los Angeles. Its name refers to the cultural concept of yiddishkayt, (Yiddish culture, literally "Jewishness" or "Yiddishness"), which the American Jewish critic Irving Howe described not in religious terms, but rather as a humanism based in a "readiness to live...beyond the clamor of self." According to the Yiddishkayt website, the organization seeks to "inspire current and future generations with the artists, writers, musicians, performers, filmmakers, philosophers, and social justice activists whose yiddishkayt — their particular form of critical and compassionate engagement with humanity — emerged from the Jewish communities of Europe as they developed in constant contact with their non-Jewish neighbors."

Since its founding in 1995, Yiddishkayt has become the largest organization devoted to yiddishkayt west of the Hudson and has produced six Yiddish festivals, a high school Yiddish language education program, two local cultural fellowships, 30 Los Angeles premiere, 16 US premiere and 5 world premiere presentations devoted to Yiddish culture, 10 cross-cultural performances, and partnerships with over 25 organizations and venues, including the Workmen's Circle, REDCAT, University of California, Los Angeles, Hollywood Forever Cemetery, and the Los Angeles Times Festival of Books. In 2009 and 2010, Yiddishkayt was named by Slingshot Fund as the "50 of the most innovative organizations in Jewish life today."

== History and activities ==
In 1995 cultural festival organizer Aaron Paley — founder of Los Angeles nonprofits Community Arts Resources (CARS) and CicLAvia — produced a one-day festival of Yiddish culture that attracted close to 6,000 people, launching Yiddishkayt Los Angeles as an organization.

Until 2004, the organization's hallmark productions were the Yiddishkayt Festivals, comprising a one-day family festival with a week-long series of events spotlighting Yiddish culture in the mosaic of cultures that thrive in Los Angeles. The first citywide Yiddishkayt Festival in 1998 featured 26 events in 19 venues, including many cross-cultural collaborations including a Klezmer-Mariachi commission and presentations at non-Jewish venues, such as the first reading of Yiddish at the Los Angeles Central Library. Yiddishkayt then expanded beyond the one-week festival model to a season of diverse, cultural programming including concerts, lectures, films and other events with artists, writers, filmmakers, musicians and academics pushing the boundaries of contemporary Yiddish culture. Examples of events produced by Yiddishkayt in the late 2000s include 2008's "The ¡Viva Yiddish! Project: The Yiddish-Latino Sound of Los Angeles" at California Plaza — in partnership with Grand Performance and featuring members of LA's Ozomatli — and 2009's Doikayt: A Los Angeles Community-Wide Artist/Yiddish Passover Seder in partnership with the Jewish Artists Initiative (JAI).

Yiddishkayt has also applied the principle of Doikayt through local history programming including tours of the neighborhood of Boyle Heights, Los Angeles, a historically multi-ethnic area that was once the hub of Los Angeles Yiddish cultural life. Stops on the tour have included the Breed Street Shul, the former Soto-Michigan Jewish Community Center, and Phillips Music Company, a store that served a diverse range of musicians including Mickey Katz, Los Lobos, and Thee Midniters.

Aside from producing performances, festivals, and tours, Yiddishkayt has also worked on Yiddish language and cultural educational projects for both youth and adults. In December 2000, Yiddishkayt organized "The Art of Yiddish: Cultural Nourishment for a New Age," a "two-week immersion in the living language." Yiddish scholar Jeffrey Shandler has characterized Yiddishkayt's presentation of Yiddish culture and language as "nature and nurture, art and science, as well as old and new, local and exotic, singular and enduring, inscrutable and accessible." In 2005, with major funding from the Steven Spielberg-founded Righteous Persons Foundation, Yiddishkayt embarked on a three-year pilot program to reintroduce Yiddish language and culture as a possible systematic course of instruction in American Jewish day schools, including the de Toledo High School.

Since the early 2010s, under the directorship of Robert Adler Peckerar, Yiddishkayt's focus has shifted to occupy a more international, inter-cultural, and digital presence. The most significant venture has been the Wallis Annenberg Helix Fellowship. Originally launched as Helix Project, the program was an immersive summer travel education program for university and graduate students. Beginning in 2011, Yiddishkayt has taken groups of students on subsidized trips through the historic Polish–Lithuanian Commonwealth (modern-day Belarus, Poland, and Lithuania), a territory that was home to millions of Yiddish-speaking Litvaks and where Yiddish was recognized as an official language. The Helix Project is designed to immerse its participants in the multi-ethnic culture of Jewish Lithuania, and students visit notable sites in Eastern European Jewish cultural and political history, including the urban centers of Minsk, Grodno, Brest-Litovsk, Białystok, and Vilnius, as well as places relevant to the lives of Yiddish cultural figures such as the poets Moyshe Kulbak and Abraham Sutzkever, the actor and director Solomon Mikhoels, anarchist thinker and activist Emma Goldman, and the members of the General Jewish Labour Bund in Lithuania, Poland and Russia. Accompanying the Helix Fellows are scholars in the fields of Jewish language, literature, and history, as well as writers, musicians, and artists who incorporate Yiddish language and culture into their work. Early in 2019, Yiddishkayt announced a major gift from Wallis Annenberg to support the Helix project and develop it into a broader program, the Wallis Annenberg Helix Fellowship. The Fellowship now attracts artists and scholars from around the world for a year-long immersive program with a month-long residential component to explore Jewish history, culture, and art.

== Activism and controversies ==
In recent years, Yiddishkayt's leadership has been outspoken on Yiddish issues, especially the Los Angeles and broader American Jewish establishment's attitudes towards Yiddish culture.

While leading a tour of Jewish Boyle Heights in 2006, Yiddishkayt founder Aaron Paley discovered that the historic Soto-Michigan Jewish Community Center had been demolished without Boyle Heights community leaders or Jewish historical activists being notified. In the LA Times, Paley denounced the demolition and its consequences for Boyle Heights' historical memory, calling the community center "a place where multicultural politics began."

In May, 2013, Yiddishkayt Executive Director Rob Adler Peckerar published an open letter on the organization's website lamenting the "state of Jewish philanthropy" in the wake of his attempts to fundraise for the Helix Project. According to Adler Peckerar, his solicitations were met on multiple occasions with criticisms that the trip did not feature "enough death," did not visit Israel, and was open to non-Jewish students. Additionally, a Jewish studies scholar was quoted in a Los Angeles Times article as saying that the Helix Project's focus on the role of secular yiddishkayt in historical Jewish identity was "just stupid" and an "attempt to rewrite Jewish history."

Also in 2013, the Los Angeles Times published a story documenting Adler Peckerar's discovery of the dilapidated Mount Zion Cemetery in East Los Angeles and the grave of the Yiddish writer Lamed Shapiro. Following the article's publication, Los Angeles philanthropist Shlomo Rechnitz donated $250,000 towards the cemetery's restoration, a project undertaken by a rabbi from Chabad of Downtown Los Angeles.

In a blog post on the Yiddishkayt website, Adler Peckerar criticized the restoration efforts on the part of Chabad and the Jewish Federation of Los Angeles, especially given the leftist politics and secularism of Lamed Shapiro and many other Los Angeles Jews interred at Mount Zion. "Rather than to look at what a neglected cemetery might tell us about a community’s relationship to its past or reconsider the disregard shown to its once-distinguished cultural icons," Adler Peckerar wrote. "The immediate reaction was to cover our collective shame and get renovations started."
