= Yiddishkeit (disambiguation) =

Yiddishkeit is the Yiddish word for 'Jewishness' (Yiddish: ייִדישקײט) and refers to concepts of cultural identity among Ashkenazi Jews.

Yiddishkeit, Yiddishkeyt or Yiddishkayt may also mean:

- Yiddishkeit (TV series), a Russian program on Jewish topics
- Yiddishkayt (organization), a cultural and educational organization in Los Angeles

== See also ==
- Yiddish
