= Reséndez =

Reséndez is a surname. Notable people with the surname include:

- Andrés Reséndez (born 1970), American historian
- Édson Reséndez (born 1996), Mexican footballer
- Irma Resendez (born 1961), American writer
- José Luis Reséndez (born 1978), Mexican actor and model

== See also ==
- Samantha Lopez-Resendez (born 1995), American politician
