= St. Mary's Catholic Church (Los Angeles) =

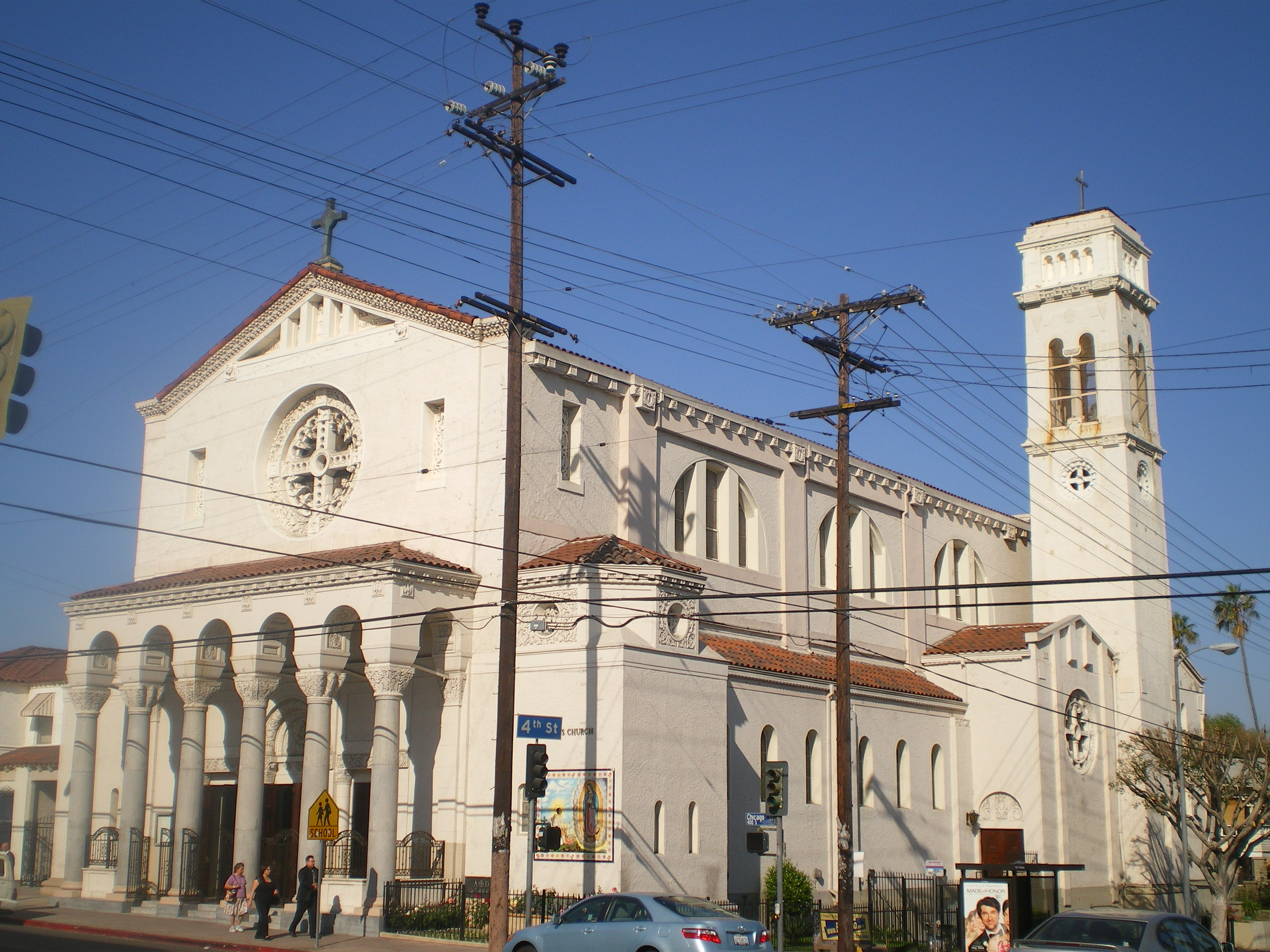
- St. Mary's Catholic Church at the corner of Fourth Street and Chicago Street in the neighborhood of Boyle Heights, Los Angeles
- St. Mary's Catholic Church
- 34.041445°N 118.214683°W
- Location: 407 South Chicago Street; Los Angeles, California 90033
- Country: United States
- Denomination: Roman Catholic
- Website: stmaryschurchla.com/

History
- Founded: Parish founded: November 20, 1896; 129 years ago
- Dedication: Church building dedicated: January 17, 1926; 100 years ago

Architecture
- Architect: Thomas Franklin Power
- Architectural type: North Italian-Byzantine
- Groundbreaking: 1924
- Completed: 1925

Administration
- Archdiocese: Archdiocese of Los Angeles San Gabriel Pastoral Region

Clergy
- Archbishop: José Horacio Gómez

St. Mary's Catholic Church is a Roman Catholic parish in the Boyle Heights neighborhood of Los Angeles, California. It was founded on November 20, 1896. The church building was dedicated on November 14, 1897, by Bishop Gregory Montgomery.

St. Mary's Church is the fifth oldest parish in Los Angeles, and was the first parish church founded to serve the neighborhood of Boyle Heights. St. Mary's boundaries once included Sacred Heart parish to the north and Our Lady Queen of the Angels Church, as well as the former Cathedral of Saint Vibiana to the west. St. Mary’s extended eastward to the Puente Hills and southward to the limits of the Wilmington parish.

It has been administered since the 1960s by the Salesians of Don Bosco. In the mid-1990s, the Daughters of Mary Help of Christians (also known as the Salesian Sisters) began administering St. Mary's Catholic School, it was the third parochial school established in the Diocese of Los Angeles in 1907.

== Church art & architecture ==
=== 1897 church ===
The first church building was built in 1897 on the corner of Fourth and Chicago Streets in the neighborhood of Boyle Heights. The building seated 400. The architect R.B Young built the church in a Romanesque style. John Hanlon constructed the building and donated the white and gold high altar and side altars.

=== 1926 church ===
In 1923, the original church was demolished to accommodate growing membership, and a new facility was built in 1926. It was dedicated by Bishop John Joseph Cantwell. The prominent Los Angeles architect Thomas Franklin Power designed the church in a North Italian-Byzantine architectural style: "It seemed to me that the North Italian-Byzantine afforded the best medium of architectural expression; and the style developed has marked beauty." The church's interior and exterior columns feature architectural elements borrowed from prominent Byzantine and Romanesque architectural buildings. Power describes the interior design, saying: "Other motifs taken from the Sta. Sofia at Constantinople, from the Cathedral and St. Apollinaris at Ravenna and from St. Mark's at Venice furnished bits of detail for capitals and panels of various portions." The statue of St. Joseph in the sanctuary is one of the few elements of the original church building that is still in use today.

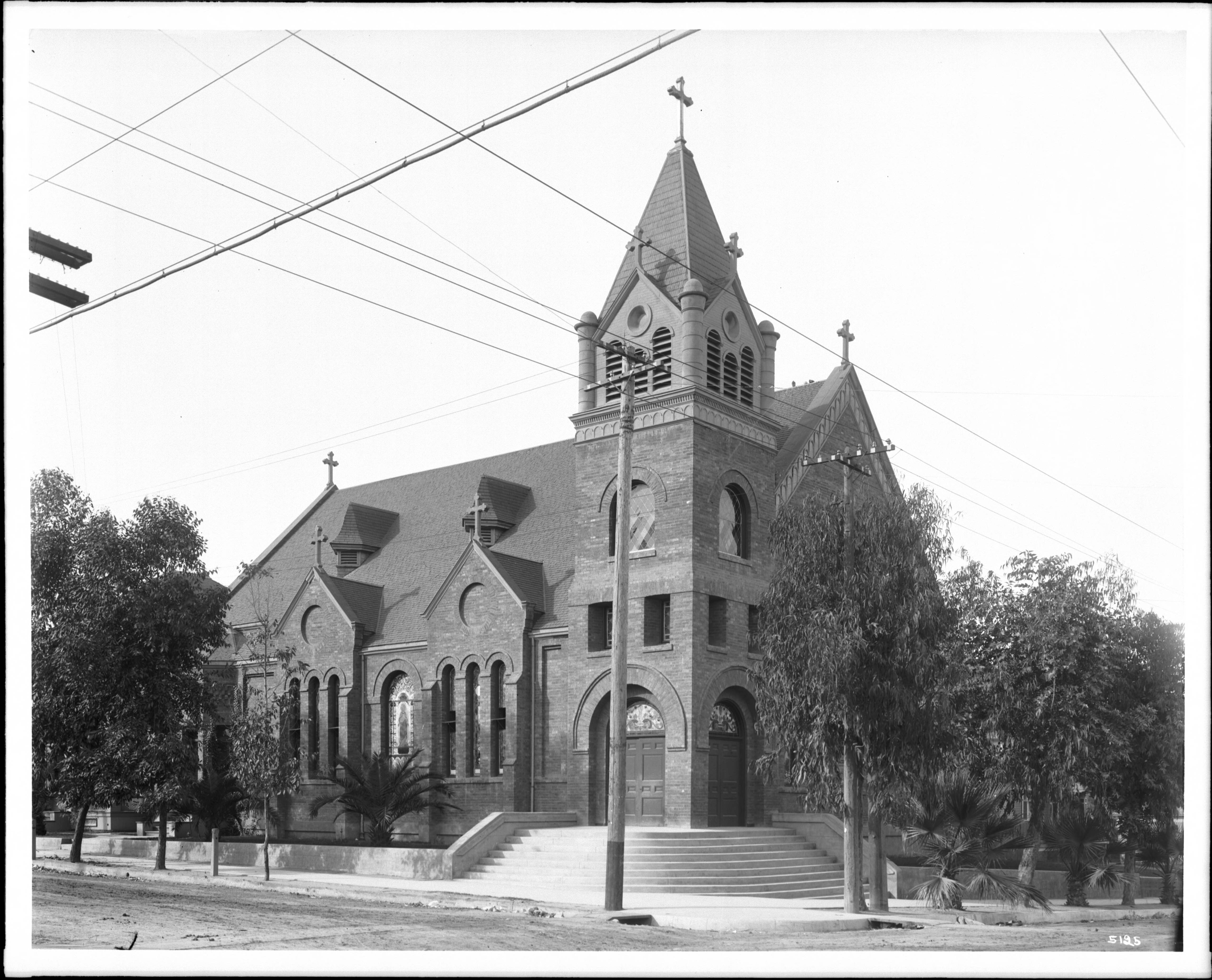
Original red brick Church on Fourth Street and Chicago Street in Boyle Heights. The Church was reconstructed to accommodate more seating.

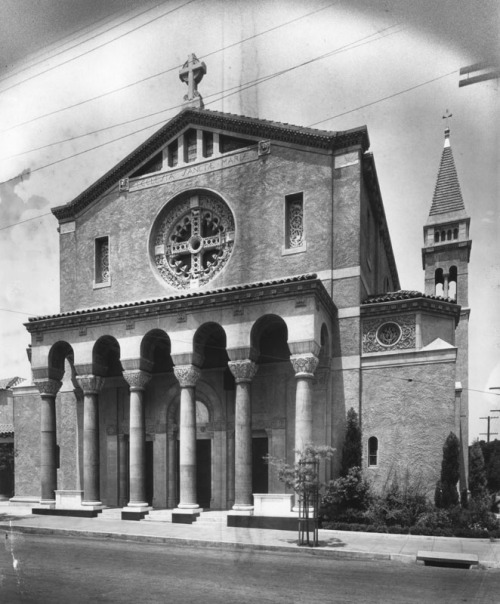
The church in 1926. Notice the spire on the bell tower, which is no longer there.

=== Church bell and bell tower ===
The original bell from St. Mary's 1896 church building is still in use. The bell tower at St. Mary's was originally 136 feet tall and included a steeple and roman cross. During renovations, the steeple was removed. The tower received damage following the 1994 Northridge Earthquake, resulting in repairs and the closure of the sidewalk.

=== Church embellishments ===
The 1926 St. Mary's Church building was embellished by noted Eastside artist Candelario Rivas. Many of the embellishments have been painted over during renovations and post-Vatican II changes to the sanctuary.

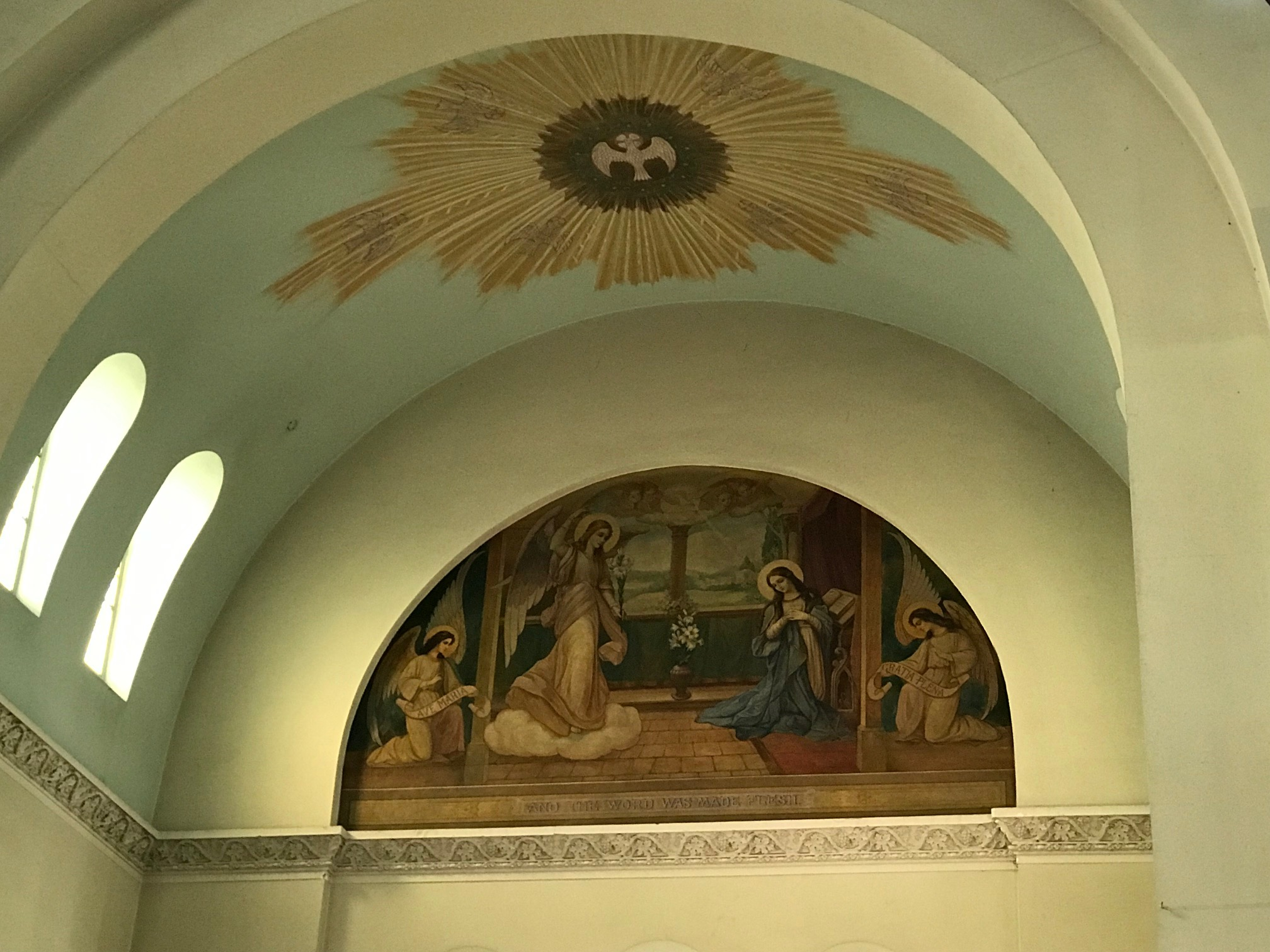
The Sanctuary mural depicting the Annunciation of Mary. The mural is painted on canvas. The canvas is in two pieces, and the stitching can be seen in the lower section of the mural.

=== Annunciation sanctuary mural ===
The mural depicting the Annunciation of Mary in the church sanctuary was commissioned and painted by ecclesiastical German artist Theodore Brasch.

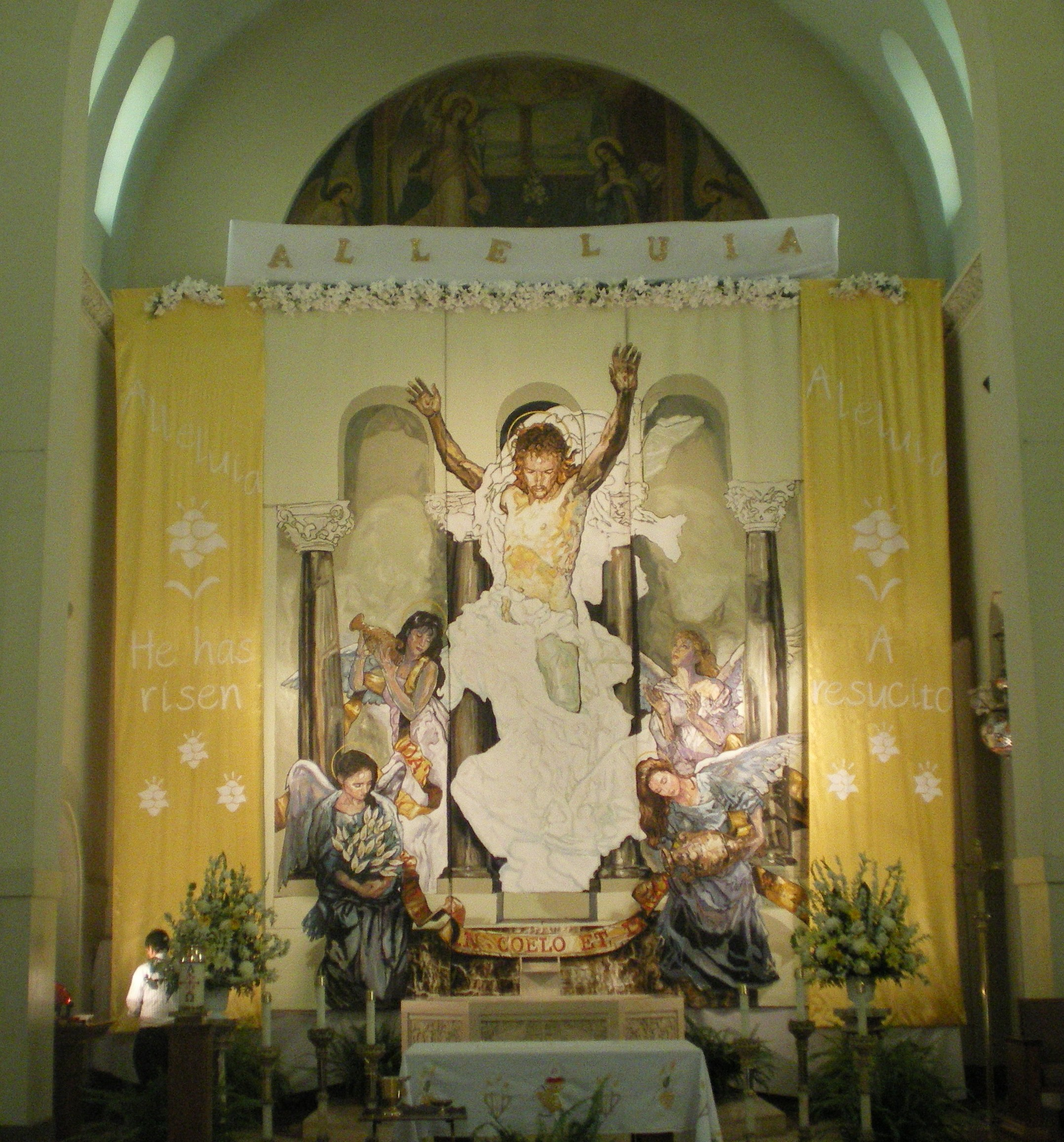
George Yepes' original 1992 mural on display during Easter Vigil services at St. Mary's Catholic Church (Los Angeles)

=== George Yepes resurrection mural (1992) ===
In 1992, renowned Chicano muralist George Yepes donated a large, three-panel canvas mural of the Resurrection of Jesus Christ painted with trompe l'oeil elements. The mural features a resurrected Christ where the Church's crucifix currently stands. The mural is painted on three large canvas panels and has a custom wooden, steel, and metal frame on which the canvas is stretched. The mural is occasionally displayed during Easter Vigil services.

== Visit by future Pope Pius XII (1936) ==
In October 1936, while on a tour of the United States, Italian Cardinal Eugenio Pacelli accompanied Archbishop Cantwell on a tour of the then-diocese. Along the way, they made a brief stop at St. Mary's Church. Three years later in March 1939, Cardinal Eugenio Pacelli was elected as Pope and took on the name of Pope Pius XII. "St. Mary's could rightfully claim to have been visited by a Pope, even if it was a few years before his election."

== Current church building ==
Few elements of the original 1896 Church remain. The statue of St. Joseph in the sanctuary of the Church is original to the 1896 Church. A statue of St. Patrick was donated to the Salesian parish in Watsonville, California, by Father Avelino Lorenzo, SDB, pastor of the Church at various times.

=== Original pipe organ ===
The original pipe organ by Kilgen of St. Louis is still in use and can be seen in the choir loft.

=== 1987 Whittier Narrows earthquake damage ===
In 1987, the Church was devastated by the Whittier Narrows earthquake, which caused major structural damage and led to the current remodel. Fr. Avelino Lorenzo, SDB, then-pastor of the parish, led an effort to repair and reinforce the church building, raising nearly $770,000 in repair funds.

=== 1994 Northridge earthquake damage ===
In 1994, the Church was once again closed due to the Northridge earthquake, which caused only cosmetic damage to the outside walls and inside artwork. Pastor Fr. Avelino Lorenzo, SDB, led the effort to restore much of the plaster-work of the Church. The work was completed by United Staff and Stone Co. of Los Angeles.

== Church appearances in movies ==
Blood In Blood Out (1993)

Shot (2017)

== Pastors that have served St. Mary's Catholic Church ==
1. Fr. Joseph Doyle (1896-1900) d.1900
2. Fr. Joseph Barron (1900-1910) d. 1910
3. Fr. Joseph McManus (1910-1918)
4. Fr. John Gallagher (1918-1919)
5. Fr. Thomas O'Regan (1919-1937) d. 1957
6. Msgr. Thomas O'Dwyer (1937-1960) d. 1966
7. Msgr. James Dessert (1960-1965)
8. Fr. Albert Negri, SDB (1965-1968)d.1971
9. Fr. Charles Farina, SDB (1968-1974)
10. Fr. Rafael Sanchez, SDB (1974-1980)
11. Fr. Roger Luna, SDB (1980-1984)
12. Fr. Joseph Farias, SDB (1984-1987, 2002-2010)
13. Fr. Avelino Lorenzo, SDB (1987-1996, 2010-2011) d. 2020
14. Fr. Jim Nieblas, SDB (1996-2002) (2022–2023)
15. Fr. Francisco Muñoz, SDB (2011-2013)
16. Fr. Jesse Montes, SDB (2013-2018)
17. Fr. Rafael Saiz, SDB (2018–2021)
18. Fr. Marco Cesar Riveros (2021-2022) (2023-2026) along with Santa Isabel

== St. Mary's Catholic School ==
St. Mary's school opened on the morning of September 15, 1907, at the corner of 4th and Breed Streets. In 1949, the school was moved to its current site near 4th and St Louis Streets, across Hollenbeck Park. The new school was dedicated on April 8, 1951 by Archbishop McIntyre.The Sisters of the Holy Names of Jesus and Mary staffed the school upon its beginning until 1992, when the Salesian sisters took over. The school was re-dedicated in 2009 by Fr. Joseph Farias. The school closed on June 9, 2022 after 115 years.

== Salesian community ==
On July 1, 2021,Santa Isabel Church located at 918 South Soto Street, next to Bishop Mora Salesian High School became under the administration of Salesians of Don Bosco. The Archdiocese of Los Angeles and Misioneros Servidores de la Palabra agreed to merge St. Mary's and Santa Isabel into one parish. The Salesian community in Boyle Heights consists of St. Mary's Church, Santa Isabel Church and its school, St. Bridget, Bishop Mora Salesian High School, Salesian Family Youth center - 3218 Wabash Ave (not active), Salesian Family Youth Center - 2228 E 4th st (active).

Mass Schedule
St. Mary's	Santa Isabel
Saturday Vigil Mass: 7pm (Spanish)	Saturday Vigil Mass: 5pm (Spanish)
Sunday Mass: 7am, 10am, 1pm, 7pm (Spanish)	Sunday Mass: 8am, 11am, 1pm, 5pm (Spanish)
Sunday Mass: 8:30am & 11:30am (English)	Sunday Mass: 9:30am (English)
Masses Tuesday - Friday: 8am (Spanish)	Masses Tuesday - Friday: 7pm (Spanish)
Mass Fridays at 7pm (Spanish)
