= Cinco Puntos Memorial =

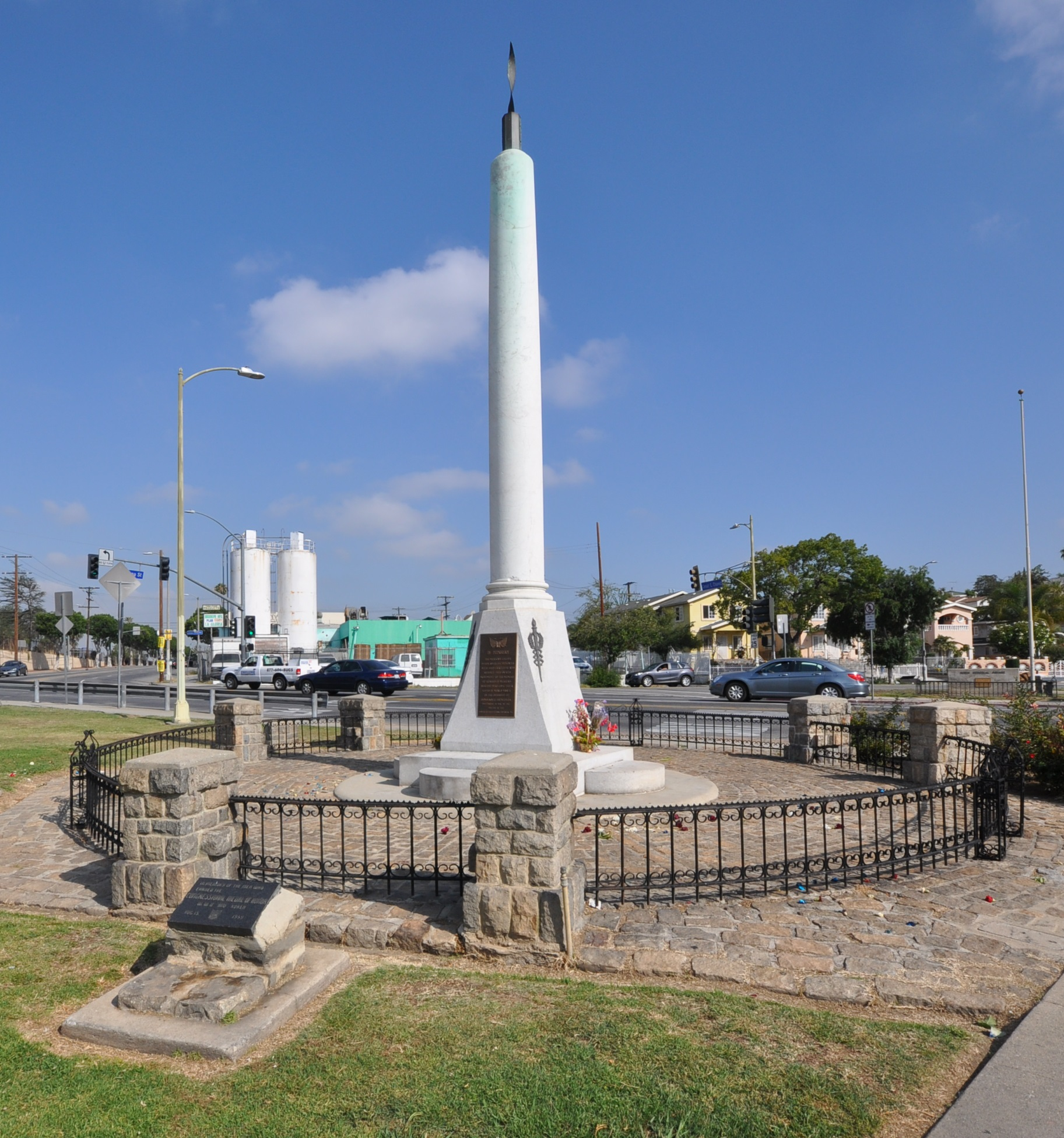
- Interactive map of Cinco Puntos Memorial
- Location: Los Angeles, California
- Coordinates: 34°02′25″N 118°11′34″W
- Material: Marble
- Completion date: 1947
- Dedicated to: Mexican-American & Chicano veterans from Los Angeles

The Cinco Puntos Memorial, formally known as the Mexican American All Wars Monument, is a marble war memorial in Los Angeles, California, honoring the contributions of the city's Mexican-American/Chicano veterans. It is located at Cinco Puntos, at the crossroads between Boyle Heights and East Los Angeles. The memorial is known as the starting point of the 1968 Chicano Moratorium protests.

== History ==
The monument was erected by the Comite Cívico Cultural Pro Raza (Spanish for "Pro Raza Cultural Civic Committee"), which held a groundbreaking ceremony on December 7, 1946. The memorial was completed by 1947. Originally dedicated solely to the fallen of World War II, it has since been rededicated to honor Mexican-American/Chicano veterans of all wars.

On December 20, 1969, Cinco Puntos was the starting point of the first Chicano Moratorium, a march in protest of the Vietnam War.

The monument hosts a 24 hour vigil every year, from the day before to the morning of Memorial Day, culminating in a formal ceremony attended by local community leaders and politicians.
