= Pintele Yid =

Pintele Yid, often translated as "Jewish spark", is a Yiddish phrase describing the notion that every Jewish person has an essential core of Jewishness within them, even if they are assimilated or are unaware of their Jewishness. Jewish converts may also be described as having a pintele Yid that led them to Judaism. The term is most commonly used by Ashkenazim and Orthodox Jews.

== Etymology ==
Pintele is a diminutive Yiddish word for "little point" and Yid is a term for a Jewish person, so pintele Yid can be translated literally as "the little point of a Jew". The Hebrew language equivalent of the term is "Nitzotz HaYehudi".

== See also ==
- Crypto-Judaism
- Jewish assimilation
- Yiddishkeit
