= Irma Resendez =

American advocate and author (born 1961)

Irma Resendez (born August 3, 1961) is an American advocate and author who founded the bilingual multiple sclerosis non-profit organization Familia Unida Living with MS in 1998. In 2005, Resendez served as a commissioner on disabilities for the city of Los Angeles. In 2014, Resendez wrote Simply Amor: A Mother's Miracle Living with MS, a collection of her personal experiences.

== Early life ==
Resendez was born on August 3, 1961, in Boyle Heights, California at White Memorial Medical Center, the daughter of Juanita Lopez. Irma and her two sisters were raised in Lincoln Heights, Los Angeles.

== Career as an activist ==
In 1998, Resendez founded Familia Unida Living with MS.

In 2005, Resendez was appointed as commissioner on disabilities for the city of Los Angeles. Resendez created the concept of the Wheelchair Wash Health Access Fair, an annual disability community event held in Los Angeles.
