= Soto-Michigan Jewish Community Center =

Community center in Los Angeles, California, United States (1934–2006)

Soto-Michigan Jewish Community Center (active from 1934 to 2006) was a community center located at the corner of Soto Street and Michigan Avenue in the Boyle Heights section of Los Angeles, California. The building was notable for its architecture and cultural legacy, it has since closed and the building was demolished in 2006.

== History ==
The JCA recruited a new director, Rabbi J. M. Cohen, and devised a new membership structure that would ensure the center's financial stability. And in September 1934, they celebrated the grand re-opening of the new Jewish Community Center in Boyle Heights, commonly known as the Soto-Michigan JCC. Its main services were athletic activities and community organization. It also functioned during weekday afternoons as a Hebrew school, directed by Rabbi Moses Tolchinsky.

In 1938, the Soto-Michigan JCC decided to rebuild their facility from the ground up with the help of a generous donation from Ida Latz in honor of the memory of her husband George. To design the new structure, Latz commissioned young architect Raphael Soriano, a Sephardic immigrant from Rhodes and graduate of the USC School of Architecture, after he was recommended by famed architectural photographer Julius Shulman. Shulman, who was raised in Boyle Heights and was active in a Boy Scouts troop that met at the JCC, was introduced to Soriano through a mutual friend, modernist architect Richard Neutra, under whom Soriano had apprenticed. The two became fast friends, Shulman photographing many of Soriano's most famous works and later hiring him to design his own home and studio in the Hollywood Hills.

After World War II, the demographics of the city began to change, and by 1958 Boyle Heights was primarily a Mexican-American neighborhood. The building was sold in 1959, but continued serving as a community center. It was renamed, The All Nations Neighborhood Center. The center continued its mission as a center for neighborhood youth.

In the 1970s and early 80s, Bill Maxwell was director of the center. At his direction, the center added art-oriented services, including photography equipment and gallery space for budding local artists, in addition to the usual athletics based activities.

Within a year or two, All Nations became a victim of budget cuts and the center was closed.

The building was sold in the mid 80's to Mr. Alfredo Zamarripa. Soon after purchasing the building, Mr. Zamarripa began to rebuild and clean up the building, as it had been left in a disarray state. Mr. Zamarripa was able to convert the JCC\All Nation Center buildings into rental halls. This provided the local Boyle Heights communities and surrounding communities a place to host large birthday parties, and other special events. Mr. Zamarripa continued his business until his passing in 1993. His daughter Rosa Zamarripa took over the business and kept the tradition alive from 1993 to 2006. In 2006 an investor approached the Zamarripa family with an offer, they agreed on the offer, and sold the property soon after.

=== Architecture ===
The building was designed by Raphael Soriano, one of the architects selected to participate in the Case Study Houses project. Soriano received the commission as a result of his friendship with noted architectural photographer Julius Shulman.

=== Mural ===
During the first protracted boycott of Gallo wines in the 1970s (based on their intransigence in dealing with the newly organized United Farm Workers), artist Carlos Almaraz painted a mural on the southern wall of the JCC building, entitled "No Compre Vino Gallo" (Don't Buy Gallo Wine). The mural was painted over after some years.

== Demolition ==
In 2006, the building, which had been owned by the Zamarripa family for several years, was sold in 2006. Soon after the sale the new owners demolished the building without a proper permit, thus destroying forever an important work by a major architect and one of the few buildings of this stature east of the LA River. A federal agency had leased the site, and the city building department assumed incorrectly that it had no jurisdiction over development for a federally leased site.
