= Boyle Heights, Los Angeles =

Boyle Heights
- Neighborhood of Los Angeles
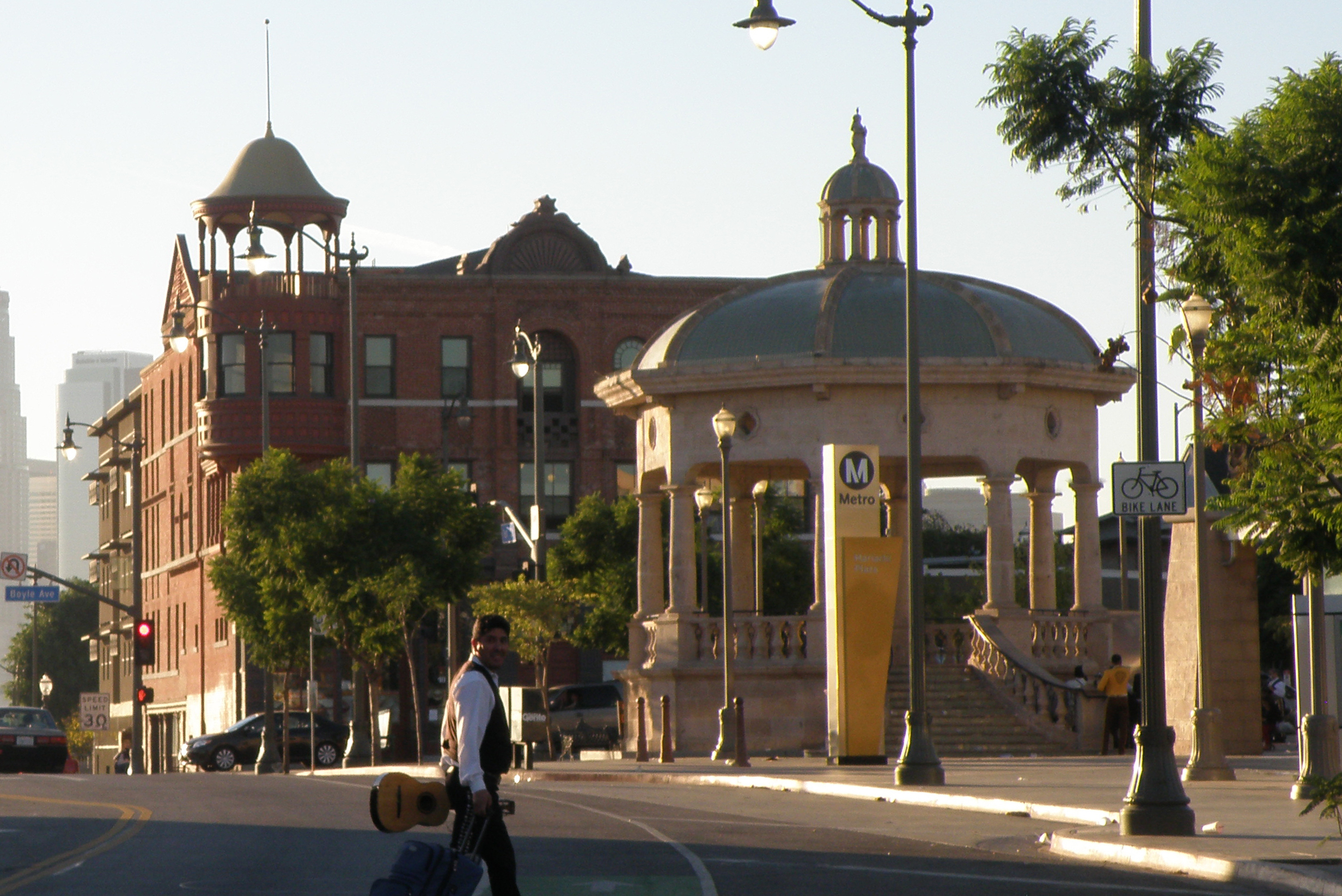
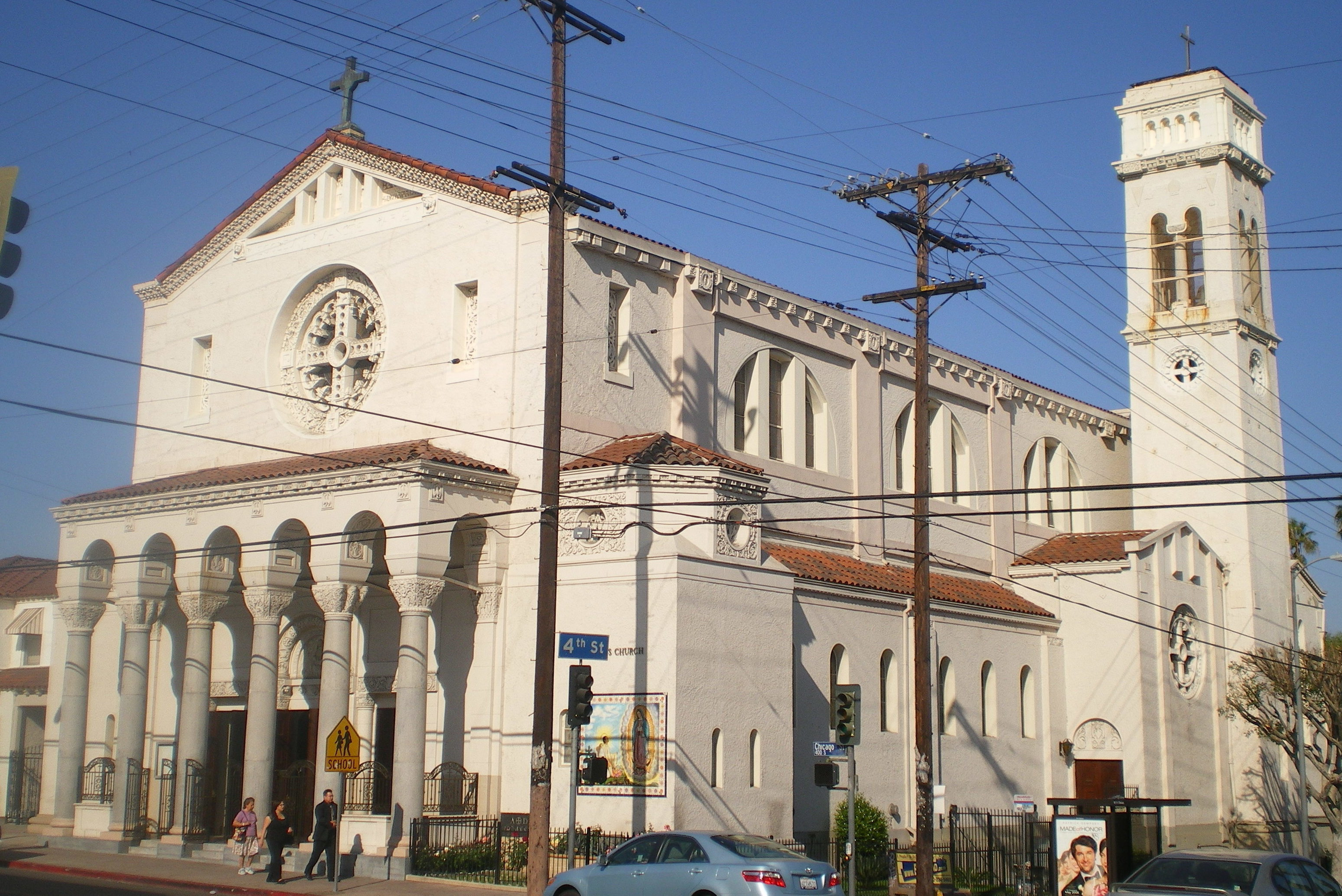
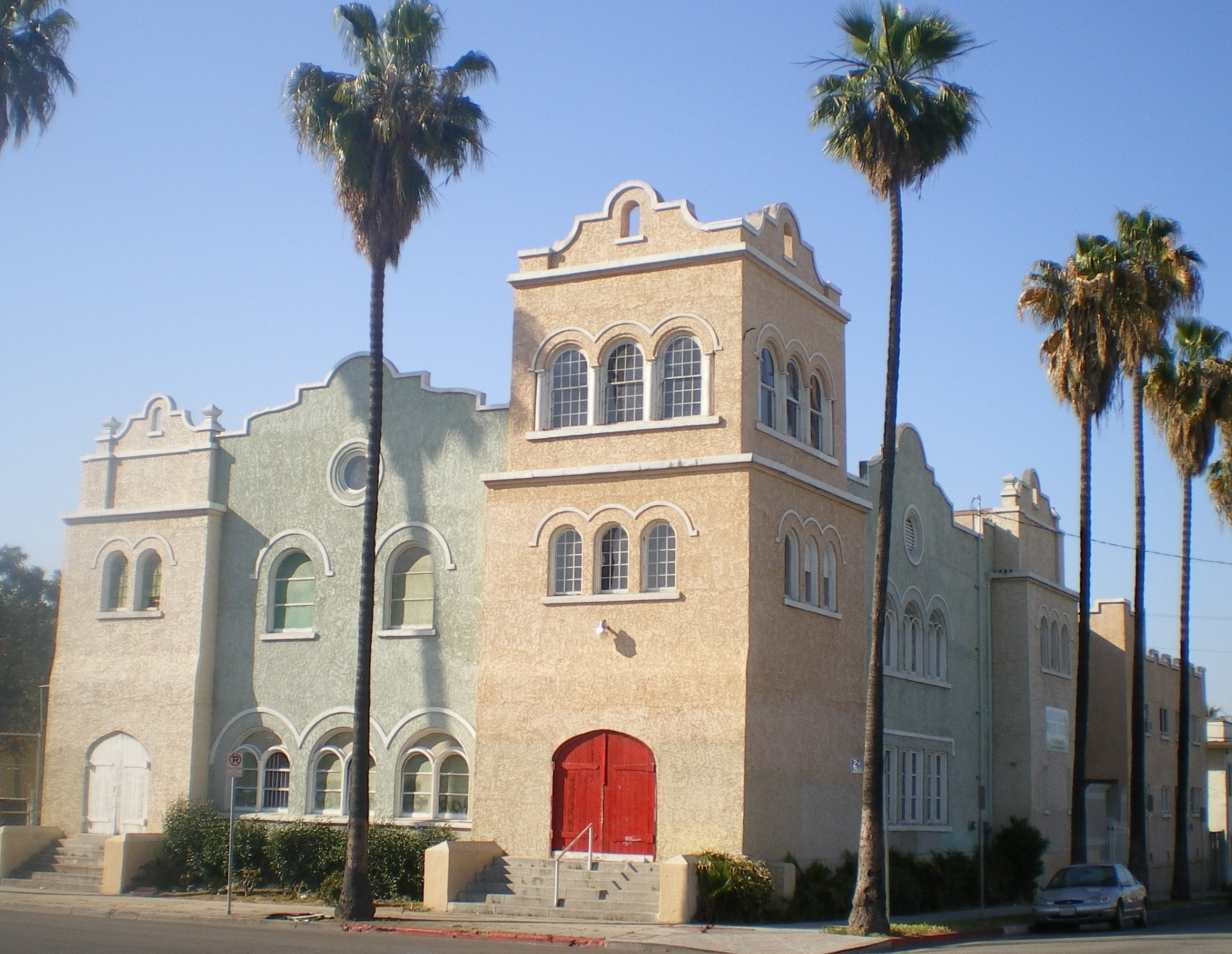
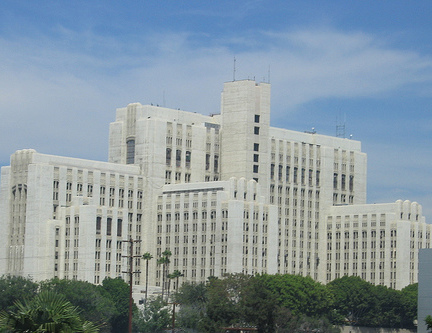
- Top: Mariachi Plaza; St. Mary's Church; bottom: Calvary Church; LAC+USC Medical Center

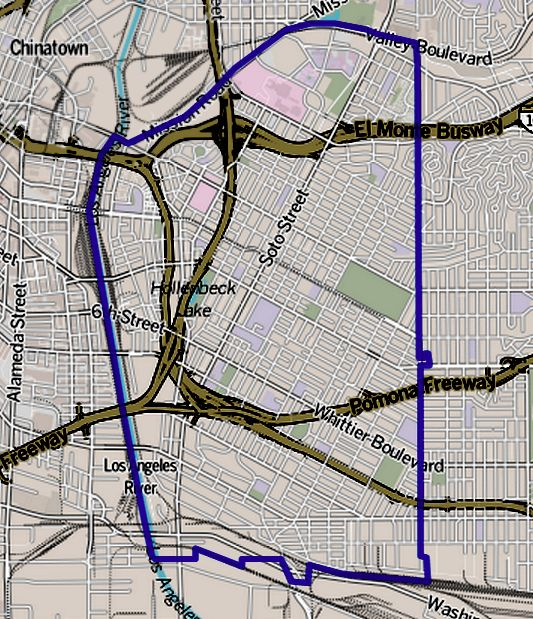
- Boundaries of Boyle Heights as drawn by the Los Angeles Times

- Location within Los Angeles
- Coordinates: 34.03389°N 118.20444°W
- Country: United States
- State: California
- County: Los Angeles
- City: Los Angeles

Government
  - City Council: Ysabel Jurado (D)
  - State Assembly: Miguel Santiago (D)
  - State Senate: Maria Elena Durazo (D)
  - U.S. House: Jimmy Gomez (D)

Area
  - Total: 6.5 sq mi (17 km^{2})

Population (2000)
  - Total: 92,785
  - Density: 14,262/sq mi (5,507/km^{2})
- ZIP Codes: 90023, 90033, 90063
- Area codes: 213/323

Boyle Heights is a neighborhood in the Eastside of Los Angeles, California, United States, located east of the Los Angeles River. It is one of the city's most notable and historic Chicano/Mexican American communities, and is home to cultural landmarks like Mariachi Plaza and events like the annual Día de los Muertos celebrations.

== History ==
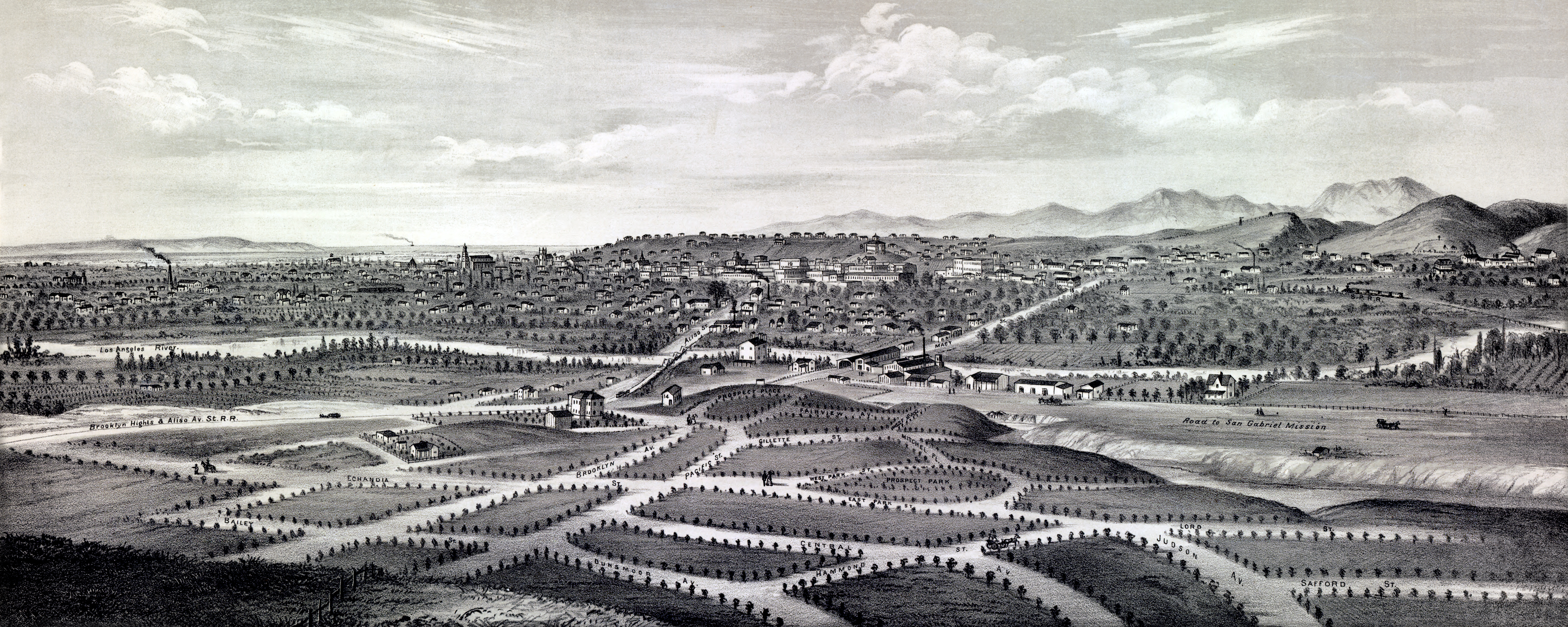
Plan of Boyle Heights in 1877

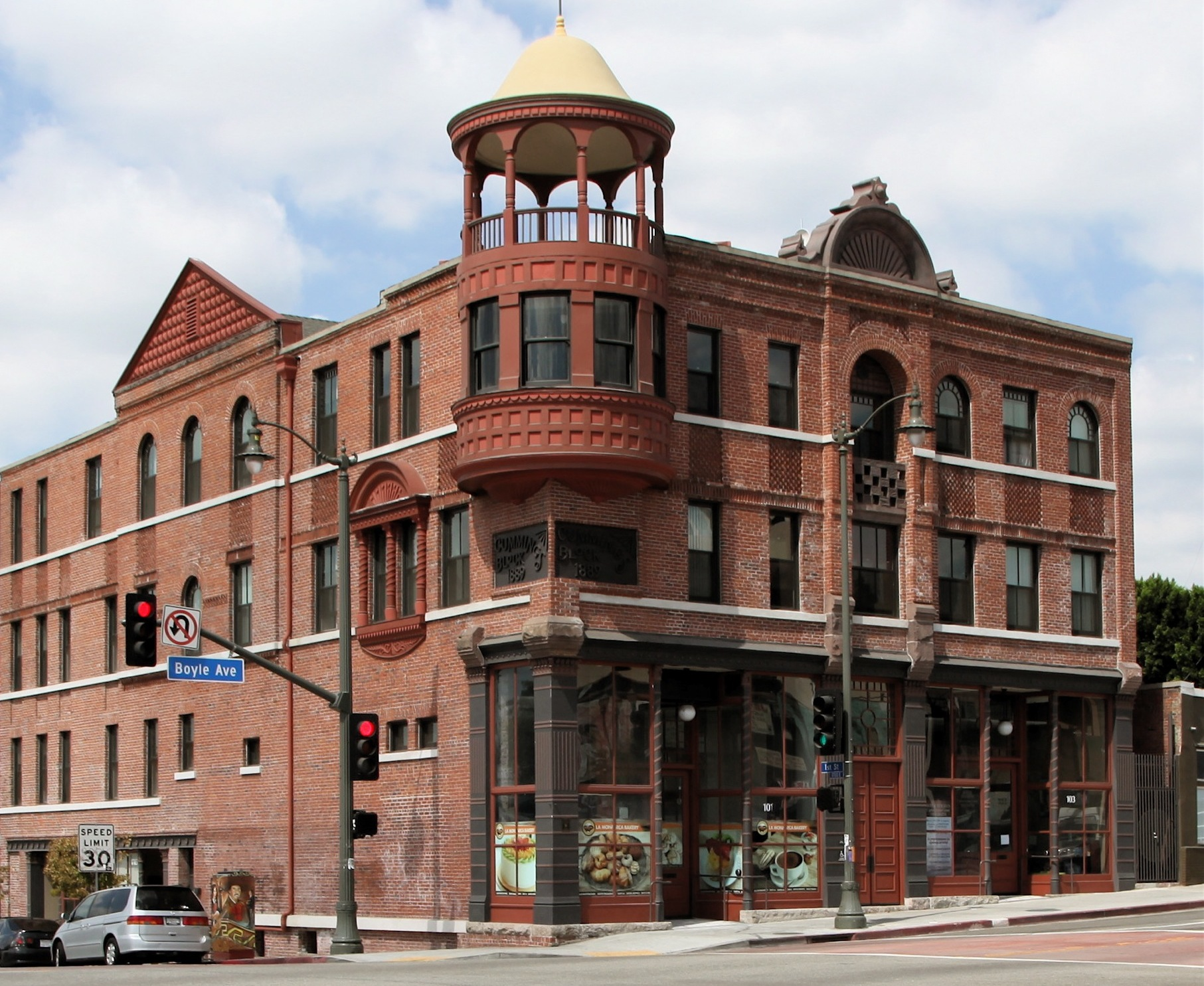
The Boyle Hotel, built 1889

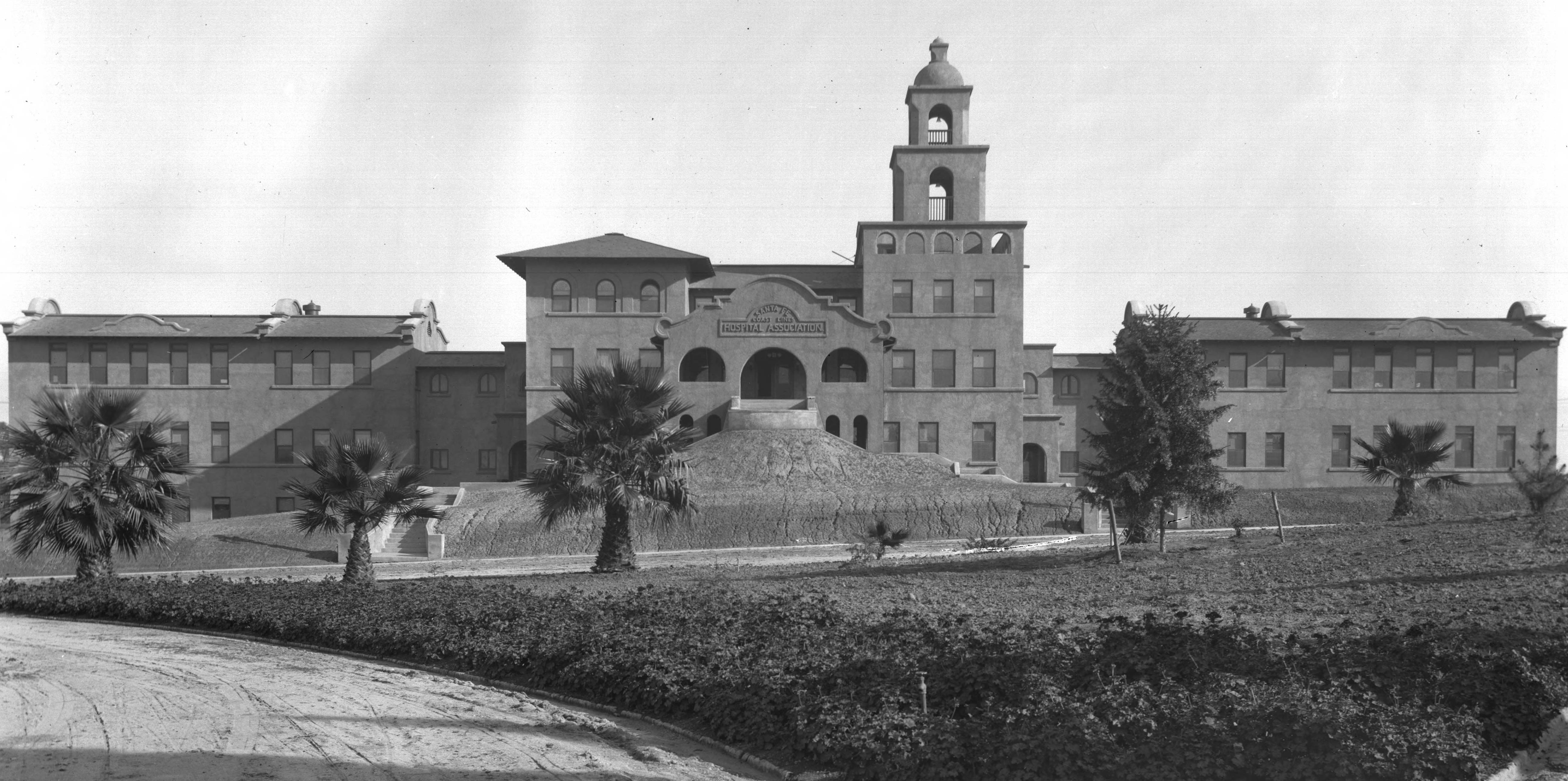
Santa Fe Hospital in 1905 (modern day Linda Vista Community Hospital)

Historically known as Paredón Blanco (Spanish for "White Bluff") during Mexican rule, what would become Boyle Heights became home to a small settlement of relocated Tongva refugees from the village of Yaanga in 1845. The villagers were relocated to this new site known as Pueblito after being forcibly evicted from their previous location on the corner Alameda and Commercial Street by German immigrant Juan Domingo (John Groningen), who paid Governor Pío Pico $200 for the land.

On August 13, 1846, Commodore Stockton's forces captured Los Angeles for the United States with no resistance. Under American rule, the Indigenous were relocated, and the Pueblito site was razed to the ground in 1847. The destruction of Pueblito was reportedly approved by the Los Angeles City Council and largely displaced the final generation of the villagers, known as Yaangavit, into the Calle de los Negros ("street of the dark ones") district.

The area was renamed for Andrew Boyle, an Irishman born in Ballinrobe, who purchased 22 acres (8.9 ha) on the bluffs overlooking the Los Angeles River after fighting in the Mexican–American War for $4,000.Boyle established his home on the land in 1858. In the 1860s, he began growing grapes and sold the wine under the "Paredon Blanc" name. His son-in-law William Workman served as early mayor and city councilman and also built early infrastructure for the area.

To the north of Boyle Heights was Brooklyn Heights, a subdivision in the hills on the eastern bank of the Los Angeles River that centered on Prospect Park.

From 1889 through 1909 the city was divided into nine wards. In 1899 a motion was introduced at the Ninth Ward Development Association to use the name Boyle Heights to apply to all the highlands of the Ninth Ward, including Brooklyn Heights and Euclid Heights. XLNT Foods had a factory making tamales here early in their history. The company started in 1894, when tamales were the most popular ethnic food in Los Angeles. The company is the oldest continuously operating Mexican food brand in the United States, and one of the oldest companies in Southern California.

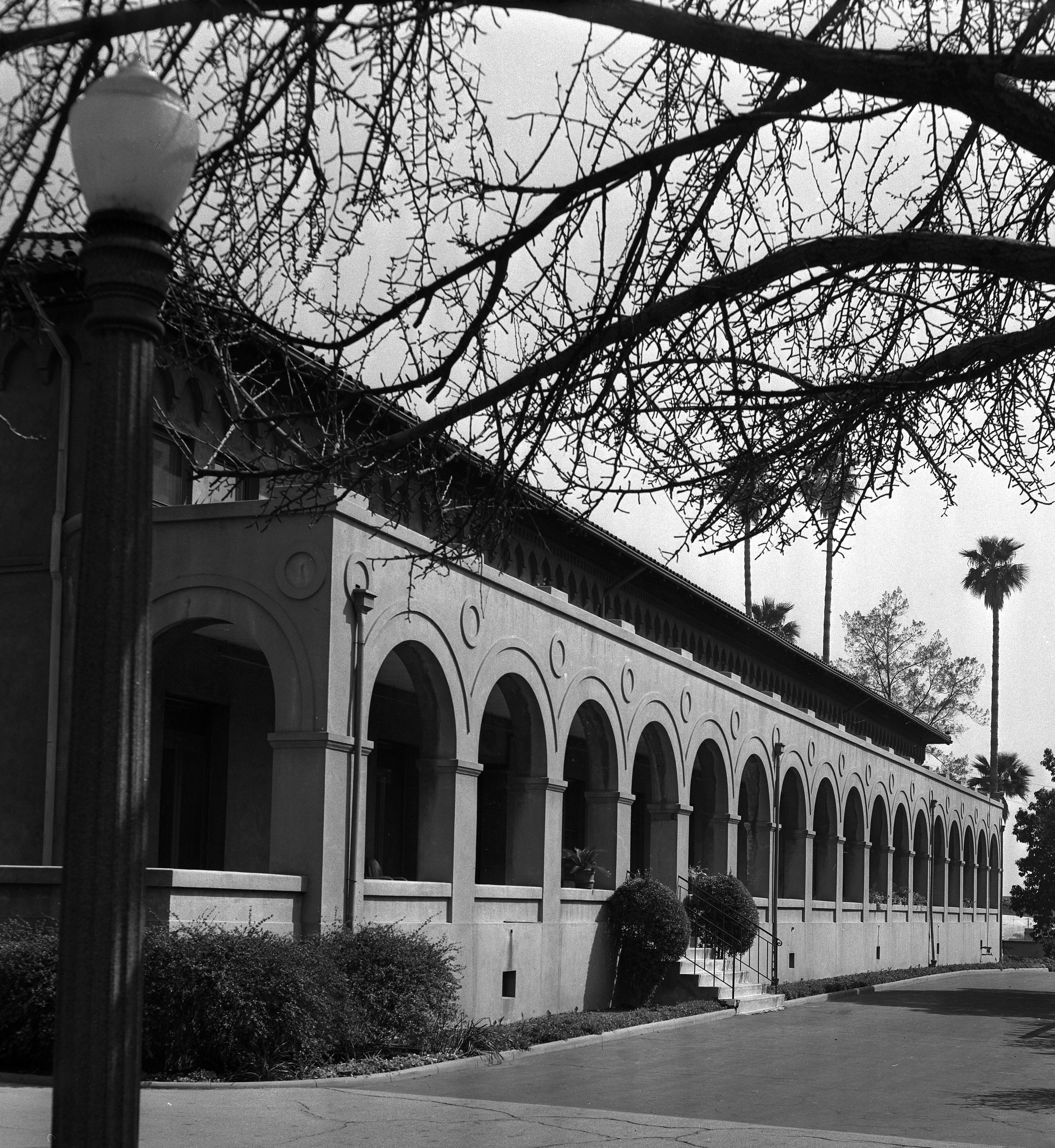
The Mission Revival style Hollenbeck Palms in 1956

In the early 1910s, Boyle Heights was one of the only communities that did not have race-restrictive housing covenants that discriminated against Japanese and other people of color. The Japanese community of Little Tokyo continued to grow and extended to the First Street Corridor into Boyle Heights in the early 1910s. Boyle Heights became Los Angeles’s largest residential communities of Japanese immigrants and Americans, apart from Little Tokyo. In the 1920s and 1930s, Boyle Heights became the center of significant churches, temples, and schools for the Japanese community. These include the Tenrikyo Junior Church of America, the Konko Church, and the Higashi Honganji Buddhist Temple; all designed by Yos Hirose. The Japanese Baptist Church was built by the Los Angeles City Baptist Missionary Society. A hospital, also designed by Hirose, opened in 1929 to serve the Japanese American community.

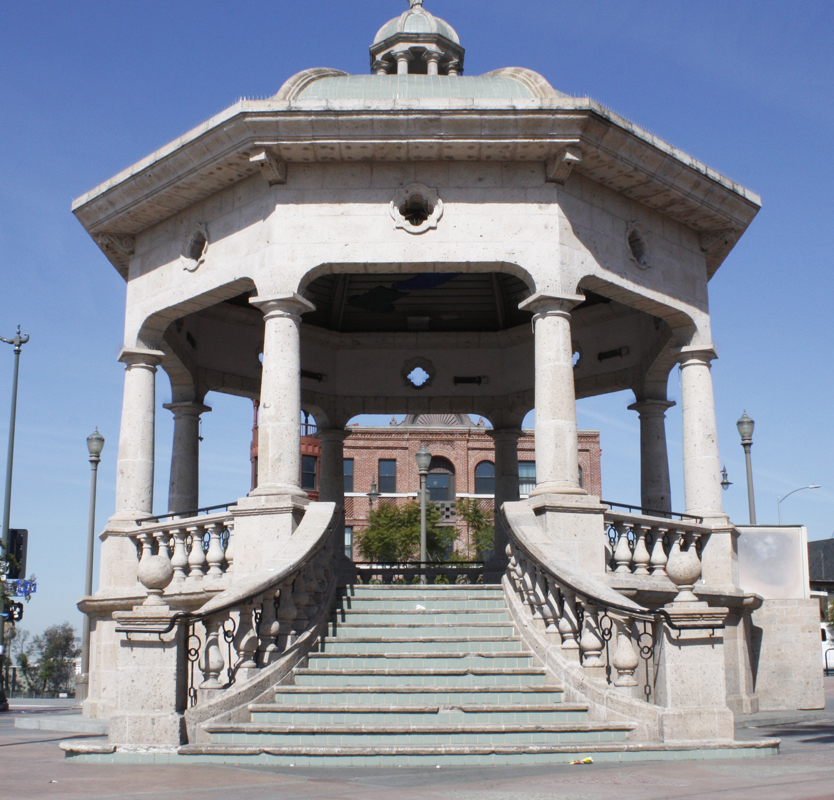
The Mariachi Plaza kiosko

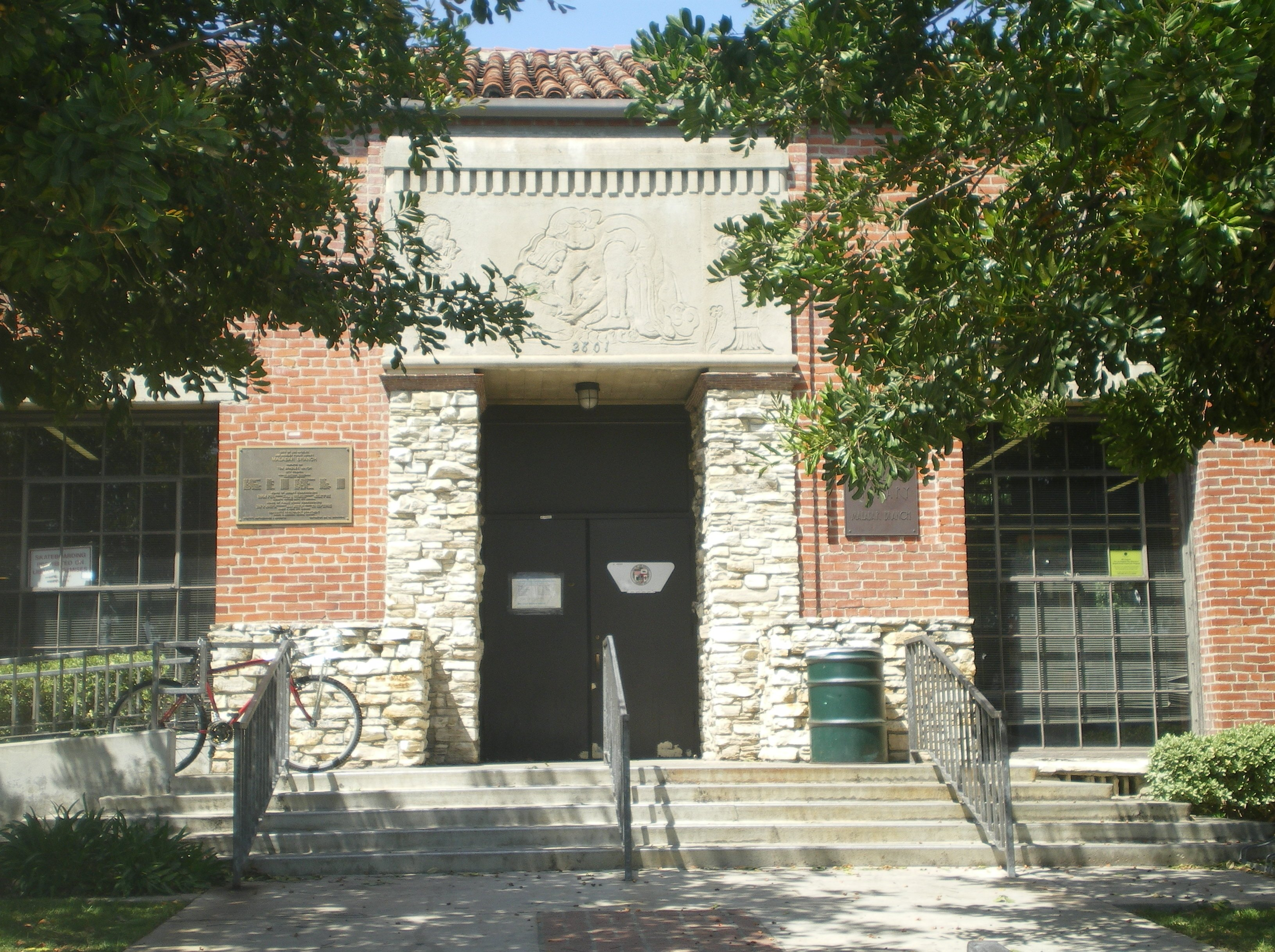
Malabar Branch Library, built in 1927 in a Spanish Eclectic style

By the 1920s through the 1960s, Boyle Heights was racially and ethnically diverse as a center of Jewish, Mexican and Japanese immigrant life in the early 20th century, and also hosted significant Yugoslav, Armenian, African-American and Russian populations. Bruce Phillips, a sociologist who tracked Jewish communities across the United States, said that Jewish families left Boyle Heights not because of racism, but instead because of banks redlining the neighborhood (denying home loans) and the construction of several freeways through the community.

In 1961, the construction of the East LA Interchange began. At 135 acres in size, the interchange is three times larger than the average highway system, even expanding at some points to 27 lanes in width. The interchange handles around 1.7 million vehicles daily and has produced one of the most traffic congested regions in the world as well as one of the most concentrated pockets of air pollution in America. This resulted in the development of Boyle Heights, a multicultural, interethnic neighborhood in East Los Angeles whose celebration of cultural difference has made it a role model for democracy.

In 2017, some residents were protesting gentrification of their neighborhood by the influx of new businesses, a theme found in the TV series Vida and Gentefied, both set in the neighborhood.

== Demographics ==
As of the 2000 census, there were 92,785 people in the neighborhood, which was considered "not especially diverse" ethnically, with the racial composition of the neighborhood at 94.0% Latino, 2.3% Asian, 2.0% White (non-Hispanic), 0.9% African American, and 0.8% other races. The median household income was $33,235, low in comparison to the rest of the city. The neighborhood's population was also one of the youngest in the city, with a median age of just 25.

As of 2011, 95% of the community was Hispanic and Latino. The community had Mexican Americans, Mexican immigrants, and Central American ethnic residents. Hector Tobar of the Los Angeles Times said, "The diversity that exists in Boyle Heights today is exclusively Latino".

Latino communities These were the ten cities or neighborhoods in Los Angeles County with the largest percentage of Latino residents, according to the 2000 census:

1. East Los Angeles, California, 96.7%
2. Maywood, California, 96.4%
3. City Terrace, California, 94.4%
4. Huntington Park, California, 95.1%
5. Boyle Heights, Los Angeles, 94.0%
6. Cudahy, California, 93.8%
7. Bell Gardens, California, 93.7%
8. Commerce, California 93.4%
9. Vernon, California, 92.6%
10. South Gate, California, 92.1%

== Latino political influence ==
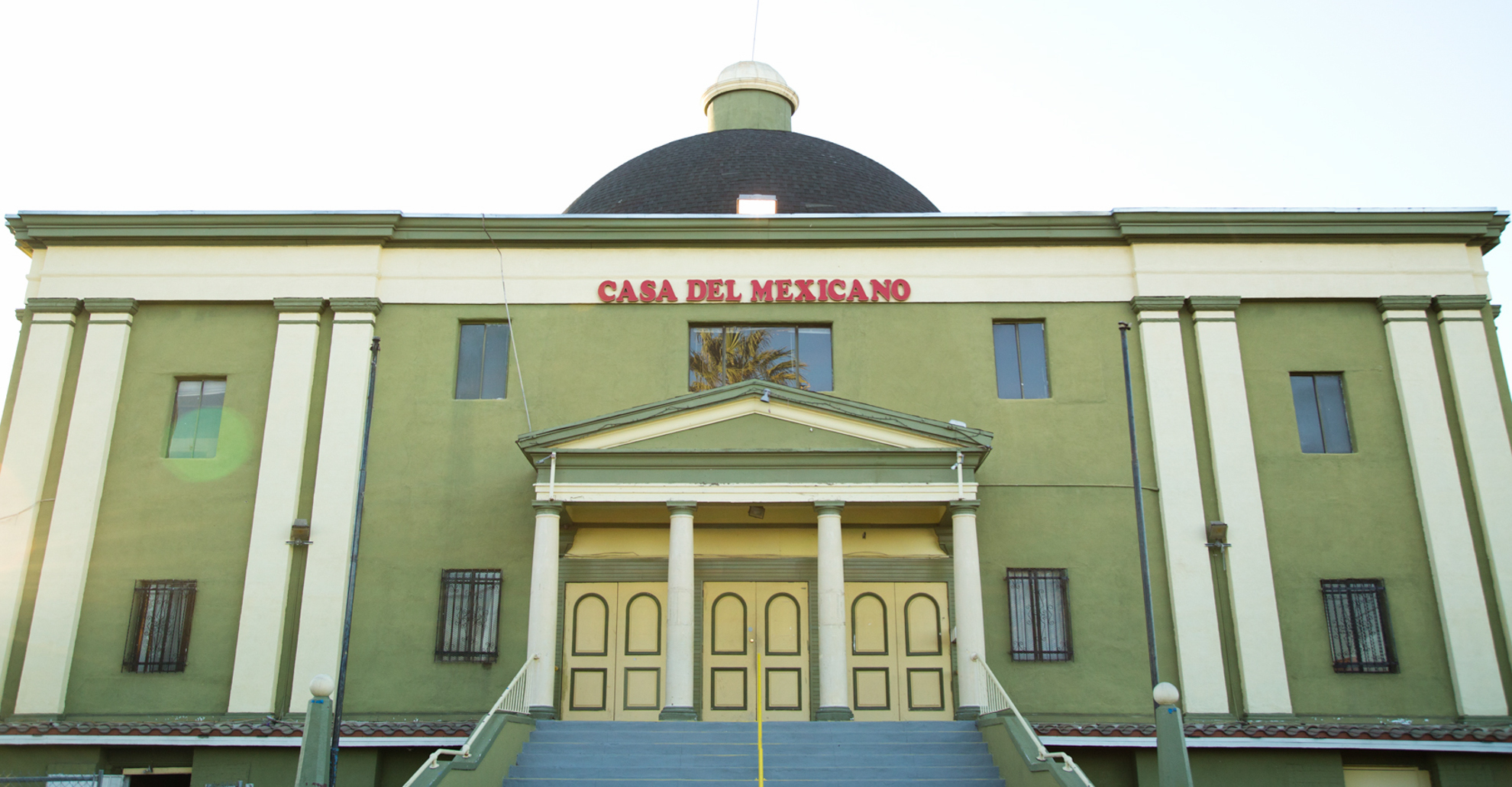
The Casa del Mexicano

The emergence of Latino politics in Boyle Heights influenced the diversity in the community. Boyle Heights was a predominantly Jewish community with "a vibrant, pre-World War II, Yiddish-speaking community, replete with small shops along Brooklyn Avenue, union halls, synagogues and hyperactive politics ... shaped by the enduring influence of the Socialist and Communist parties" before Boyle Heights became predominantly associated with Mexicans/Mexican Americans. The rise of the socialist and communist parties increased the people's involvement in politics in the community because the "liberal-left exercised great influence in the immigrant community". Even with an ever-growing diversity in Boyle Heights, "Jews remained culturally and politically dominant after World War II".

Nevertheless, as the Jewish community was moving westward into new homes, the largest growing group, Latinos, was moving into Boyle Heights because to them this neighborhood was represented as upward mobility. With Jews and Latinos both in Boyle Heights, these men, part of the Jewish Community Relations Council (JCRC) — Louis Levy, Ben Solnit, Pinkhas Karl, Harry Sheer, and Julius Levitt — helped to empower the Latinos who either lived among the Jewish people or who worked together in the factories.

The combination of Jewish people and Latinos in Boyle Heights symbolized a tight unity between the two communities. The two groups helped to elect Edward R. Roybal to the City Council over Councilman Christensen; with the help from the Community Service Organization (CSO). In order for Roybal to win a landslide victory over Christensen, "the JCRC, with representation from business and labor leaders, associated with both Jewish left traditions, had become the prime financial benefactor to CSO .. labor historically backed incumbents ... [and] the Cold War struggle for the hearts and minds of minority workers also influenced the larger political dynamic".

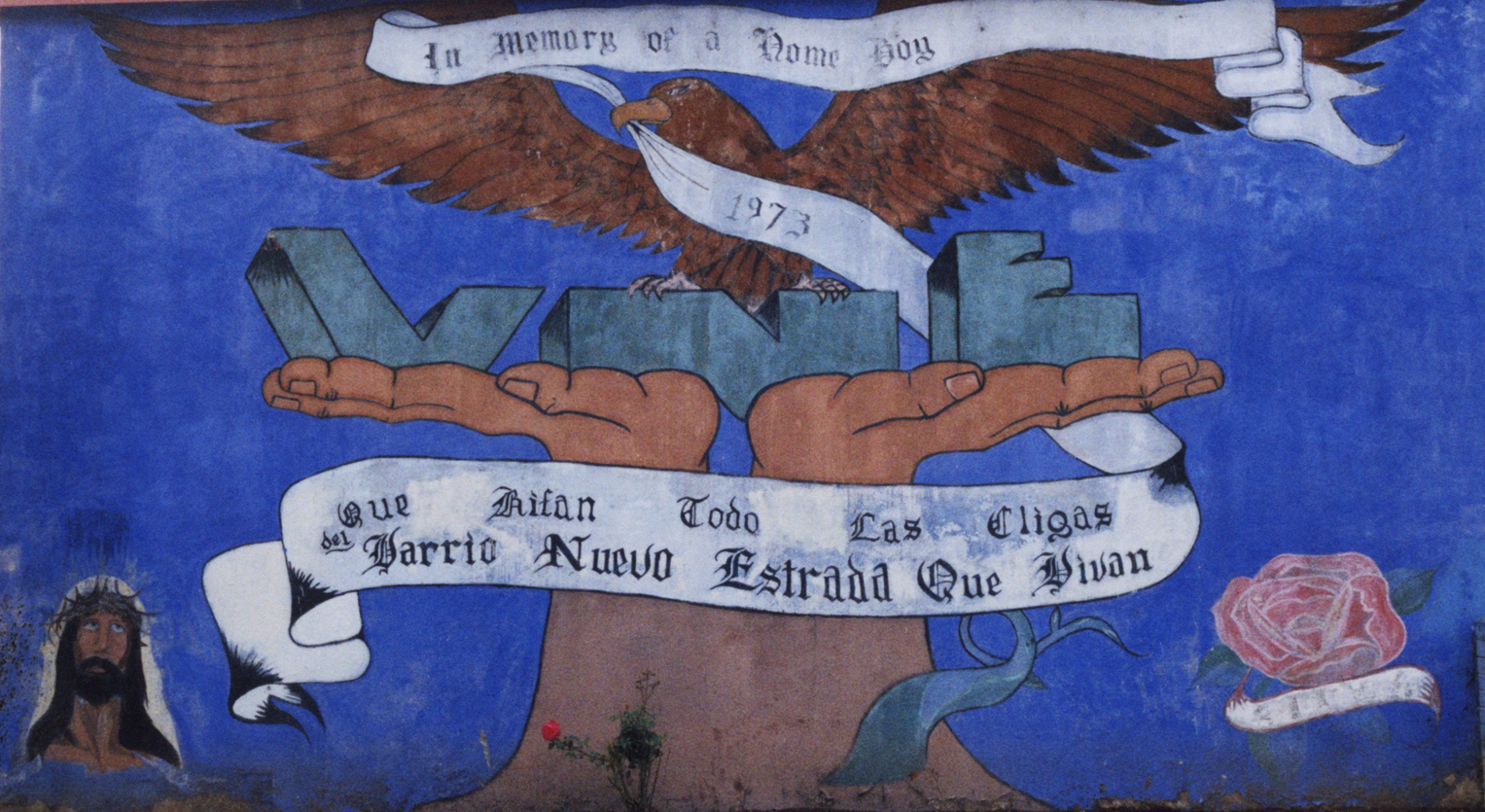
Chicano muralism in Boyle Heights

In the 1947 election, Edward Roybal lost, but Jewish community activist Saul Alinsky and the Industrial Areas Foundation (IAF) garnered support from Mexican Americans to bring Roybal to victory two years later 1949. (Bernstein, 243) When Roybal took office as city councilman in 1949, he experienced racism when trying to buy a home for his family. The real estate agent told him that he could not sell to Mexicans, and Roybal's first act as councilman was to protest racial discrimination and to create a community that represented inter-racial politics in Boyle Heights.(Bernstein, 224).

This Latino-Jewish relationship shaped politics in that when Antonio Villaraigosa became mayor of Los Angeles in 2005, "not only did he have ties to Boyle Heights, but he was elected by replicating the labor-based, multicultural coalition that Congressman Edward Roybal assembled in 1949 to become Los Angeles's first city council member of Latino heritage". Further, the Vladeck Center (named after Borukh Charney Vladeck) contributed to the community of Boyle Heights in a big way because it was not just a building, it was "a venue for a wide range of activities that promoted Jewish culture and politics".

== Government and infrastructure ==
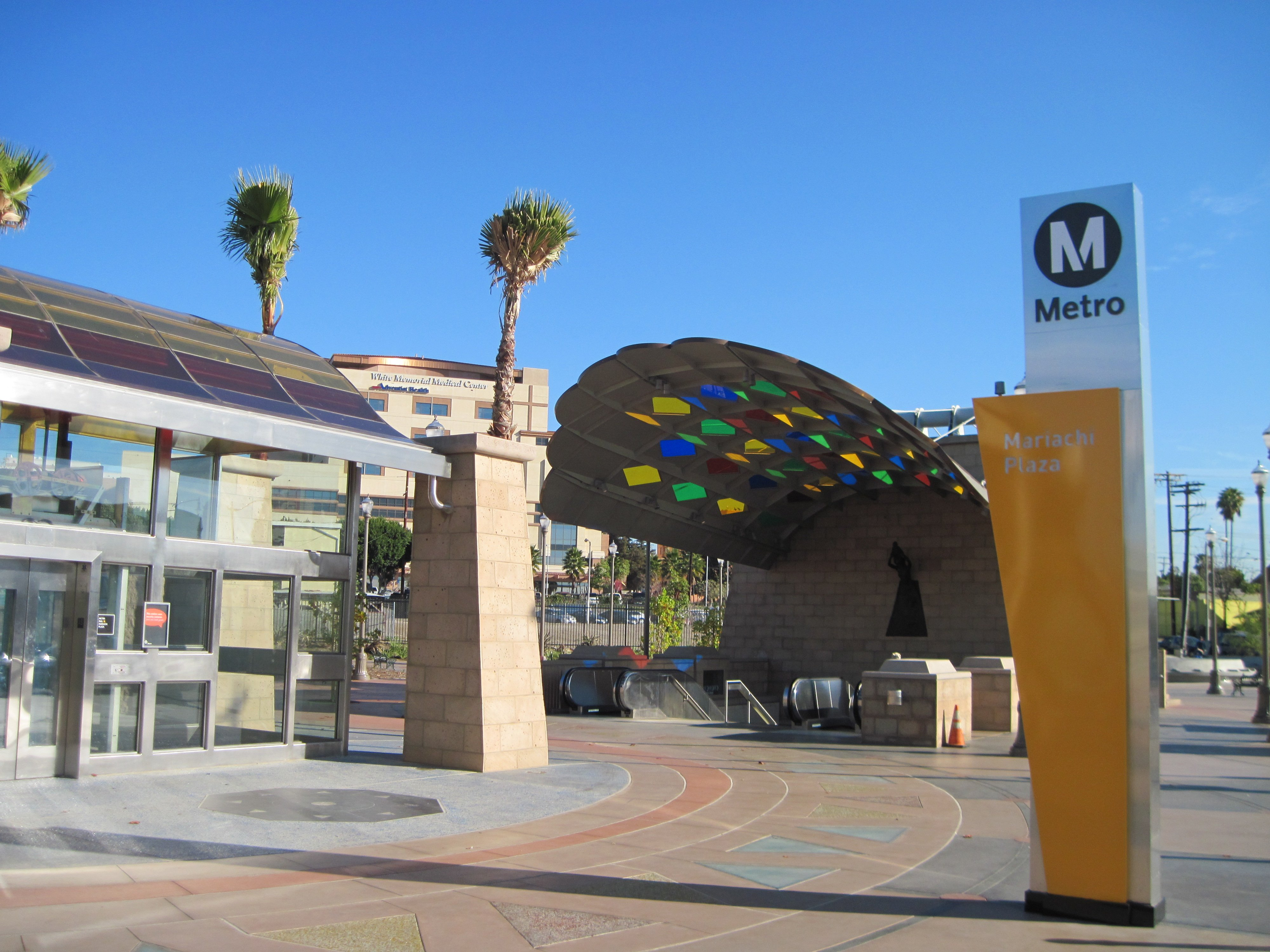
Mariachi Plaza station (2009), one of four Los Angeles Metro Rail stations in Boyle Heights

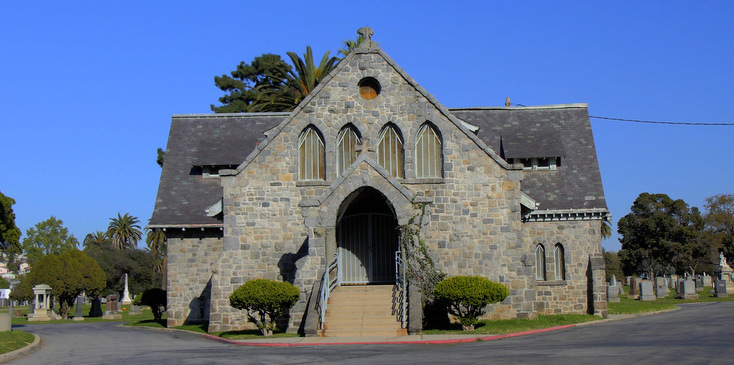
Evergreen Cemetery chapel (2013)

The Los Angeles County Department of Health Services operates the Central Health Center in Downtown Los Angeles, serving Boyle Heights.

The United States Postal Service's Boyle Heights Post Office is located at 2016 East 1st Street.

The Social Security Administration is located at 215 North Soto Street Los Angeles, CA 90033 1-800-772-1213

=== Transportation ===
Boyle Heights is home to four stations of the Los Angeles Metro Rail, all served by the E Line:

- Pico/Aliso station
- Mariachi Plaza station
- Soto station
- Indiana station

== Education ==
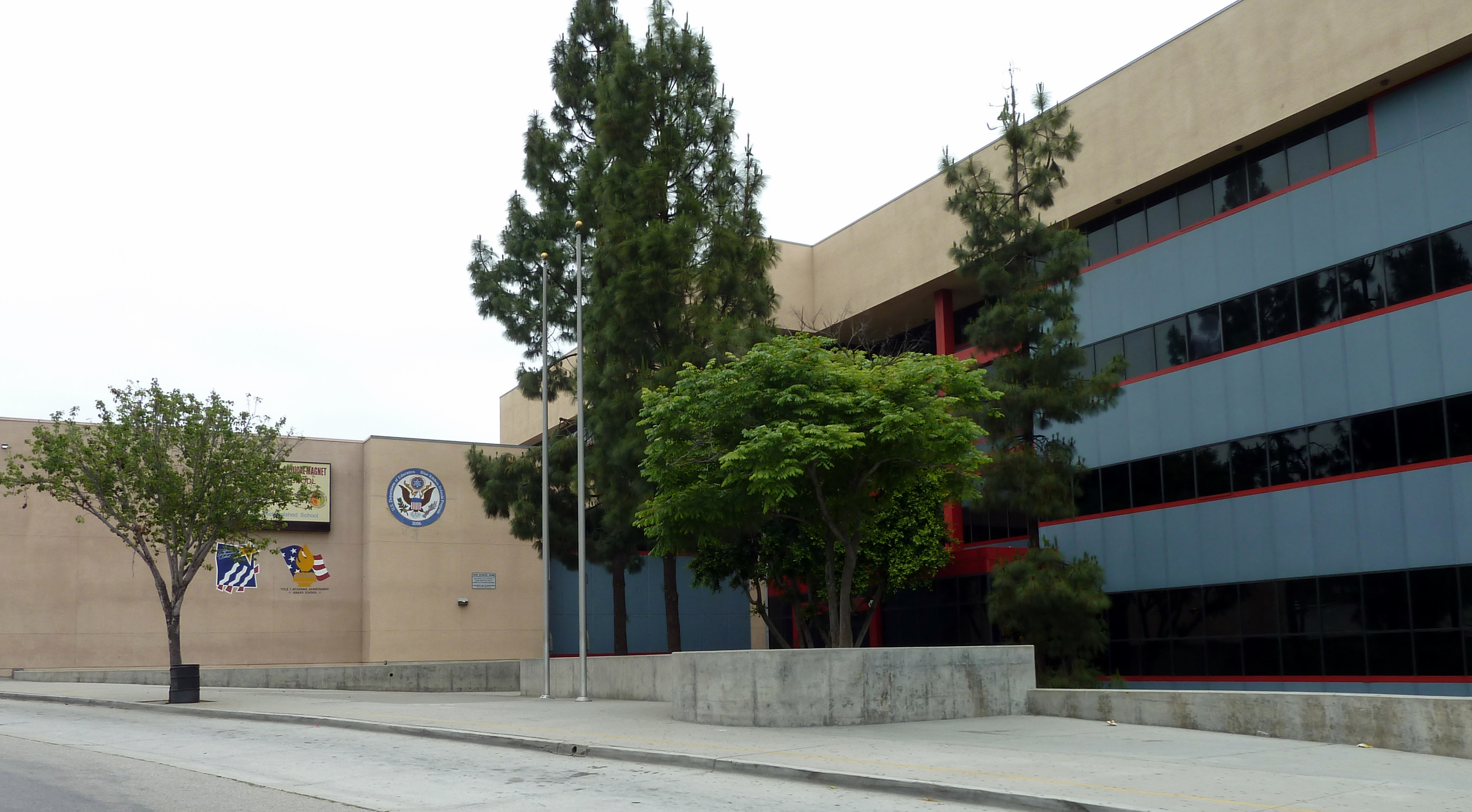
Francisco Bravo Medical Magnet High School, 2011

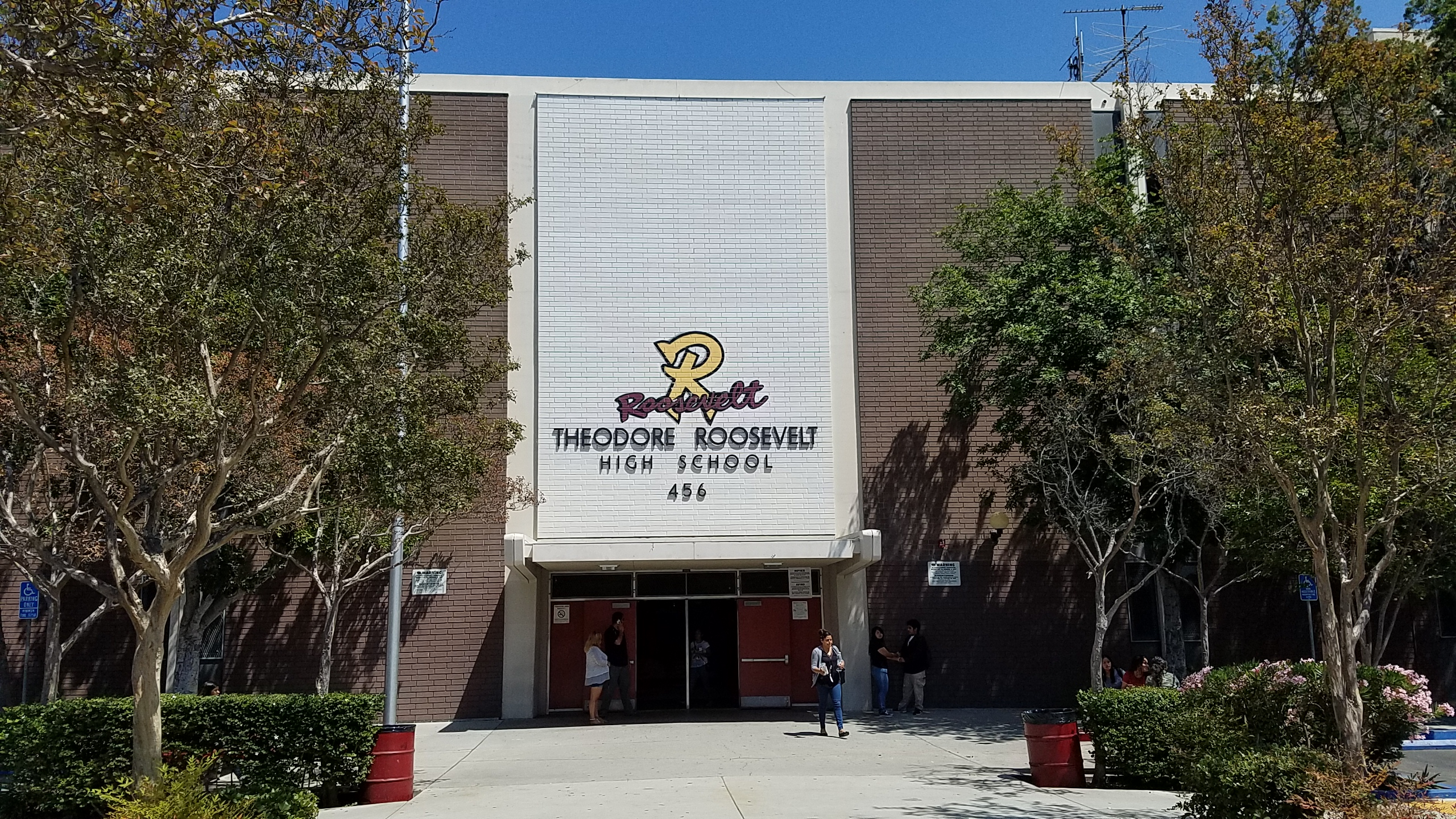
Theodore Roosevelt High School, 2016

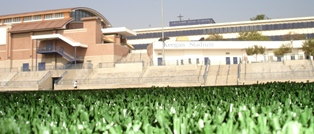
Bishop Mora Salesian High School, 2006, a Catholic high school named after Bishop Francisco Mora y Borrell

Just 5% of Boyle Heights residents aged 25 and older had earned a four-year degree by 2000, a low percentage for the city and the county. The percentage of residents in that age range who had not earned a high school diploma was high for the county.

=== Public ===
- SIATech Boyle Heights Independent Study, Charter High School, 501 South Boyle Avenue
- Extera Public School, Charter Elementary, 1942 E. 2nd Street and 2226 E. 3rd Street
- Extera Public School #2, Charter Elementary, 1015 S. Lorena Street
- Francisco Bravo Medical Magnet High School, alternative, 1200 North Cornwell Street
- Theodore Roosevelt High School, 456 South Mathews Street
- Mendez High School 1200 Playa Del Sol
- Animo Oscar De La Hoya Charter High School, 1114 South Lorena Street
- Boyle Heights Continuation School, 544 South Mathews Street* Central Juvenile Hall, 1605 Eastlake Avenue
- Hollenbeck Middle School, 2510 East Sixth Street
- Robert Louis Stevenson Middle School, 725 South Indiana Street
- KIPP Los Angeles College Preparatory, charter middle, 2810 Whittier Boulevard
- Murchison Street Elementary School, 1501 Murchison Street
- Evergreen Avenue Elementary School, 2730 Ganahl Street
- Sheridan Street Elementary School, 416 North Cornwell Street
- Malabar Street Elementary School, 3200 East Malabar Street
- Breed Street Elementary School, 2226 East Third Street
- First Street Elementary School, 2820 East First Street
- Second Street Elementary School, 1942 East Second Street
- Soto Street Elementary School, 1020 South Soto Street
- Euclid Avenue Elementary School, 806 Euclid Avenue
- Sunrise Elementary School, 2821 East Seventh Street
- Utah Street Elementary School, 255 Gabriel Garcia Marquez Street
- Bridge Street Elementary School, 605 North Boyle Avenue
- Garza (Carmen Lomas) Primary Center, elementary, 2750 East Hostetter Street
- Christopher Dena Elementary School, 1314 Dacotah Street
- Learning Works Charter School, 1916 East First Street
- Lorena Street Elementary School, 1015 South Lorena Street
- PUENTE Learning Center, 501 South Boyle Avenue
- East Los Angeles Occupational Center (Adult Education), 2100 Marengo Street
- Endeavor College Preparatory Charter School, 1263 S Soto St, Los Angeles, CA 90023

=== Private ===
- Bishop Mora Salesian High School, 960 South Soto Street
- Santa Teresita Elementary School, 2646 Zonal Avenue
- Assumption Elementary School, 3016 Winter Street
- Saint Mary Catholic Elementary School, 416 South Saint Louis Street
- Our Lady of Talpa, elementary, 411 South Evergreen Avenue
- East Los Angeles Light and Life Christian School, 207 South Dacotah Street
- Santa Isabel Elementary School, 2424 Whittier Boulevard
- Dolores Mission School, elementary, 170 South Gless Street
- Cristo Viene Christian School, 3607 Whittier Boulevard
- Resurrection, elementary, 3360 East Opal Street
- White Memorial Adventist School, 1605 New Jersey Street
- PUENTE Learning Center, 501 South Boyle Avenue

== Landmarks ==
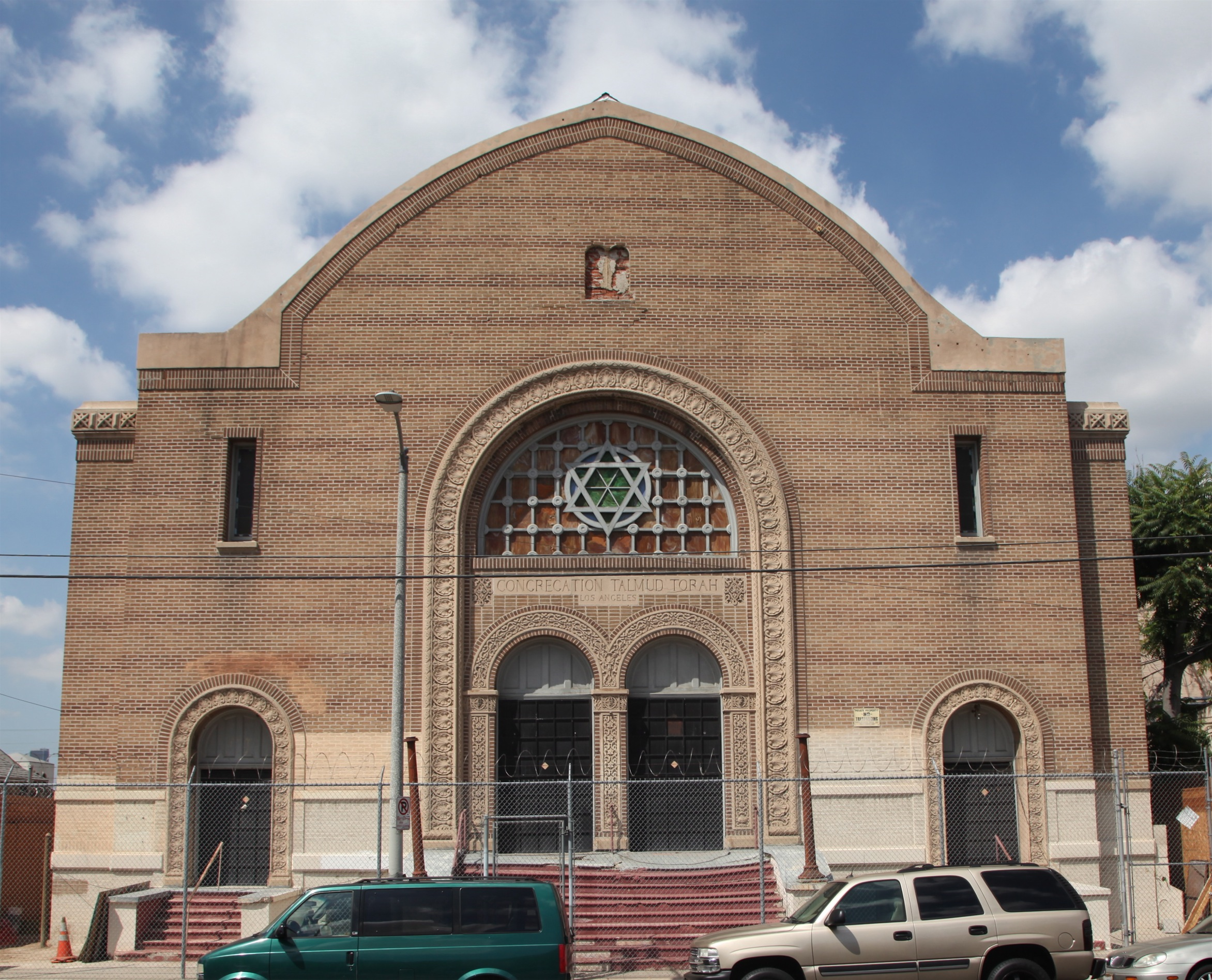
Breed Street Shul

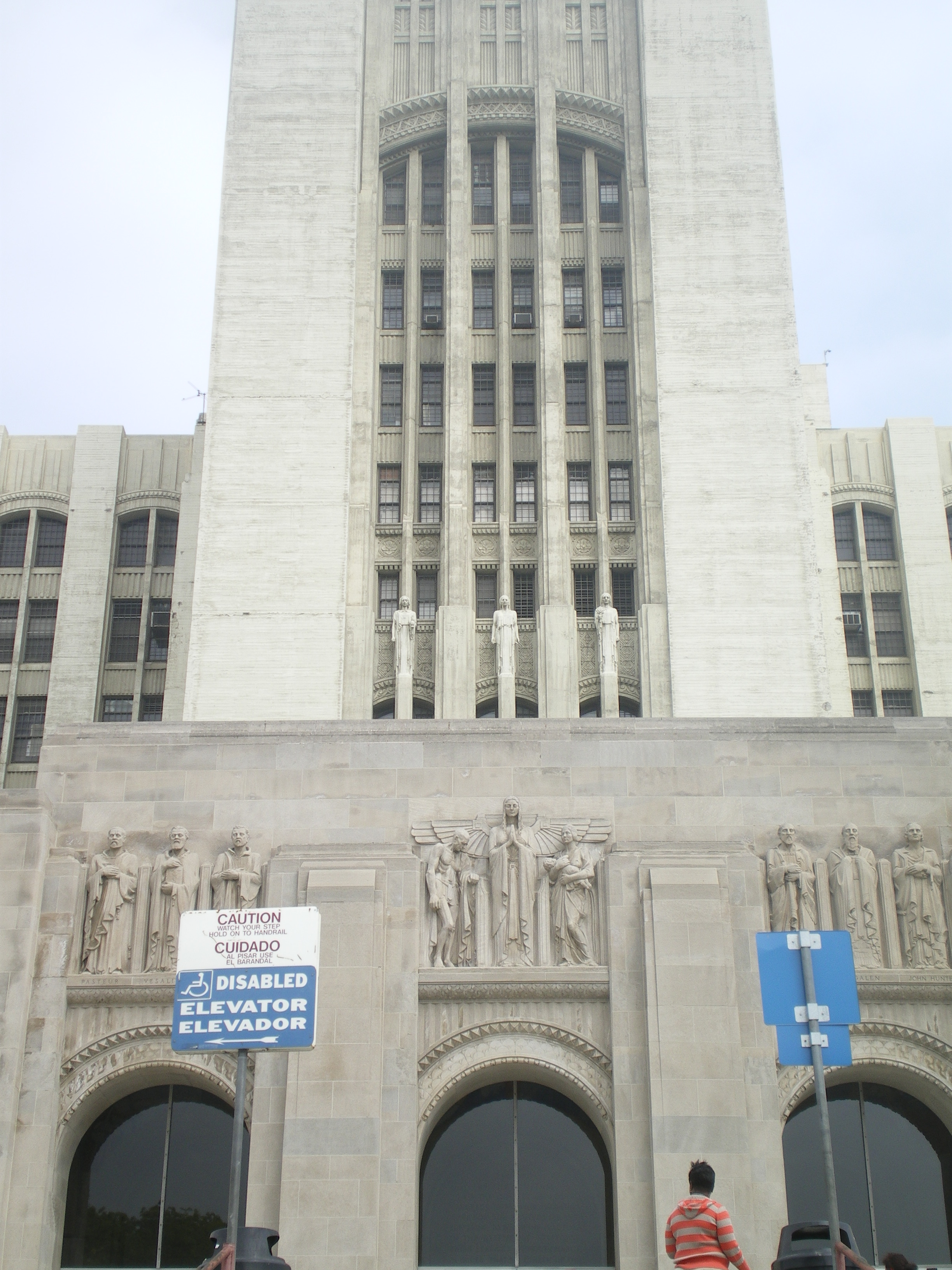
LAC+USC Medical Center

=== Existing ===
- Breed Street Shul, which was declared a historic-cultural monument in 1988
- Self-Help Graphics and Art, the first community-based organization in the country to create a free public celebration of Day of the Dead
- Los Angeles County+USC Medical Center/Keck School of Medicine of USC
- Los Angeles County Department of Coroner
- Estrada Courts Murals
- Evergreen Cemetery
- Hazard Park
- Mariachi Plaza
- Hollenbeck Park
- Linda Vista Community Hospital (Now Hollenbeck Terrace Apartments, former Santa Fe Coast Lines Hospital)
- Sears Building, Olympic Boulevard and Soto St.
- Malabar Public Library
- Lucha Underground Temple, where the television program Lucha Underground was taped.
- St. Mary's Catholic Church (4th and Chicago Streets)

=== Demolished ===
- Soto-Michigan Jewish Community Center
- Aliso Village
- Sisters Orphan Home, operated by Daughters of Charity of Saint Vincent de Paul, 917 S. Boyle Ave. demolished due to earthquake damage and construction of freeway

== Notable people ==
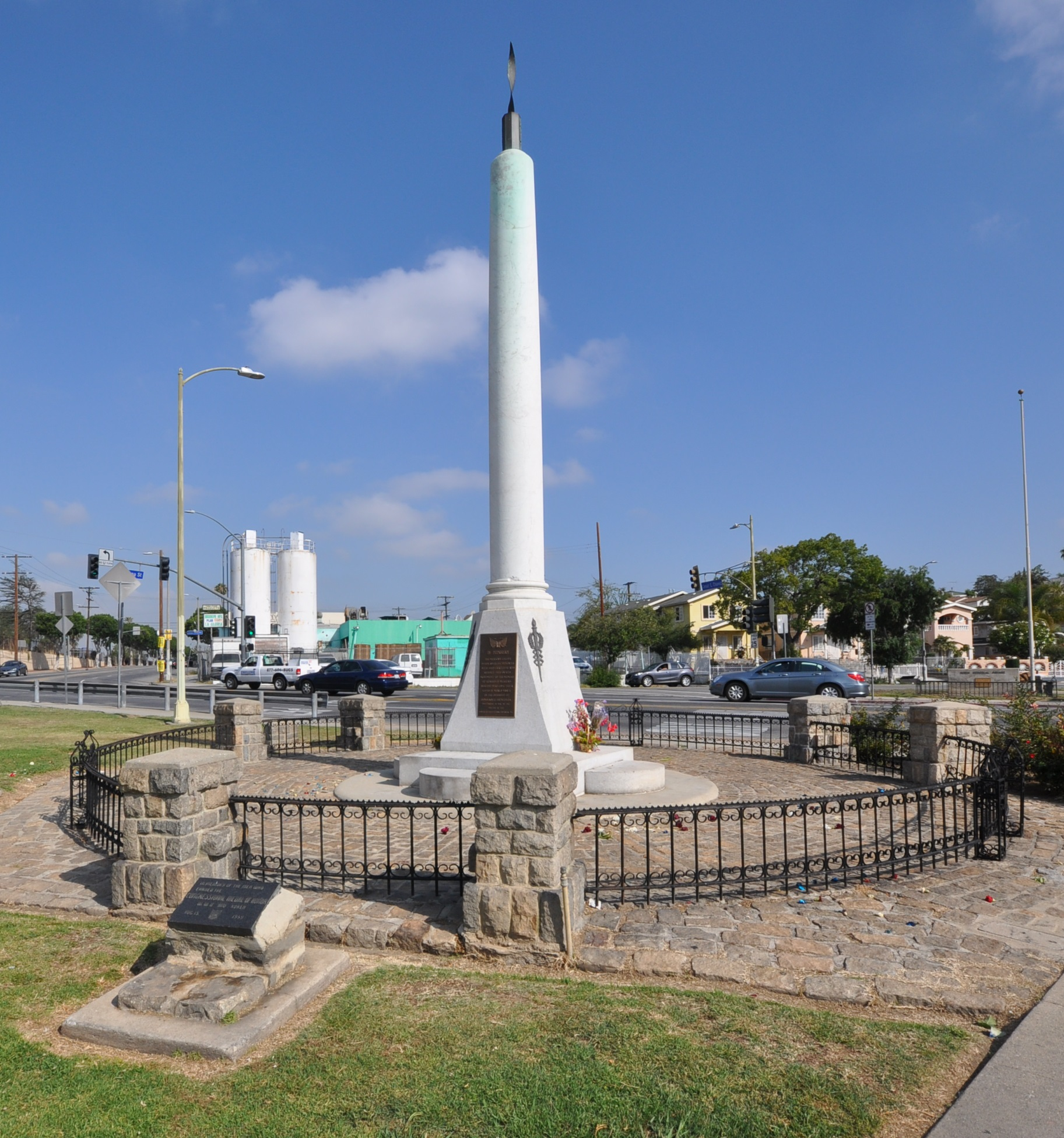
The Cinco Puntos Memorial honors Mexican-American/Chicano veterans of all wars.

=== Politics ===
- Sheldon Andelson, first openly gay person to be appointed to the University of California Regents or any high position in state government
- Hal Bernson, Los Angeles City Council member, 1979–2003
- Martin V. Biscailuz, attorney and Common Council member, 1884–85
- Howard E. Dorsey, City Council member, 1937
- Oscar Macy, county sheriff and member of the Board of Supervisors
- Edward R. Roybal, Democrat in the U.S. House of Representatives for the 30th District and later for the 25th District of California; member of the Los Angeles City Council
- Winfred J. Sanborn, City Council member, 1925–29
- Antonio Villaraigosa, Mayor of Los Angeles
- Zev Yaroslavsky, Los Angeles County Board of Supervisors, 3rd District

=== Sports ===
- Lillian Copeland (1904–1964), Olympic discus champion; set world records in discus, javelin, and shot put
- William Harmatz, jockey
- Ron Mix (born 1938), Football Hall of Famer
- Donald Sterling, Former Los Angeles Clippers owner

=== Criminals ===
- Mickey Cohen, gangster

=== Arts and culture ===
- Oscar Zeta Acosta, attorney, writer, community activist
- Lou Adler, record producer, manager
- Herb Alpert, musician
- Greg Boyle, Catholic priest, community activist
- Richard Duardo, master printmaker, visual artist, and illustrator
- Norman Granz, musician
- Josefina López, writer
- Anthony Quinn, actor
- Andy Russell, international singing star
- Julius Shulman, photographer
- Taboo, rapper
- will.i.am, recording artist and music producer
- Kenny Endo, taiko drummer, recording artist
- Rubén Guevara, writer, poet, musician, activist, music producer

=== Publishing ===
- Jack T. Chick, publisher of Chick tracts

=== Other notable people ===
- Irma Resendez (born 1961), advocate, author and organization founder

== In popular culture ==
- 1917: Nuts in May
- 1957: The Pajama Game
- 1979: Boulevard Nights
- 1980: The Other Side of the Bridge (Spanish: Del Otro Lado del Puente)
- 1983: Michael Jackson's Thriller
- 1987: Born in East L.A.
- 1992: American Me
- 1993: Blood In Blood Out
- 1995: Dangerous Minds
- 1998: The Wonderful Ice Cream Suit
- 1998–2009 Breaking the Magician's Code: Magic's Biggest Secrets Finally Revealed
- 2007: Under the Same Moon
- 2008: The Take
- 2011: A Better Life
- 2013: "Mojada"
- 2014–2018: Lucha Underground
- 2015: East LA Interchange (documentary)
- 2015/2016: No más bebés
- 2018–2020: Vida
- 2020: Valorant (Sunset)
- 2020–2021: Gentefied
- 2021: Night Teeth

== See also ==
- List of Los Angeles Historic-Cultural Monuments on the East and Northeast Sides
- List of districts and neighborhoods in Los Angeles
- Redz Bar (1953–2015 and 2016–present) historic lesbian bar in Boyle Heights
