= Yiddishkeit =

Ashkenaz Jewish culture and religious practice

Yiddishkeit, also spelled Yiddishkayt or Yidishkayt (Yiddish: ייִדישקייט, romanized: Yidishkayt, lit. 'Jewishness', i.e. "a Jewish way of life"), (Note: Competing ways of transcription exist for the suffix: -keit, based on the orthography of Standard Modern German, and -keyt using the standardized YIVO transliteration. In Northeastern (Lithuanian) and Central (Polish) dialects of Yiddish, the suffix is pronounced with the diphthong [ai] (as in English kite), but in Southeastern (Ukrainian) dialects with the diphthong [ei] (as in English Kate). Therefore the spelling Yiddishkayt is often used as well.) is a term that can refer broadly to Judaism or specifically to forms of Orthodox Judaism when used particularly by religious and Orthodox Ashkenazim. In a more general sense, it has come to mean the "Jewishness" or "Jewish essence" of Ashkenazi Jews in general and the traditional Yiddish-speaking Jews of Eastern and Central Europe in particular.

According to The Jewish Chronicle, "Yiddishkeit evokes the teeming vitality of the shtetl, the singsong of Talmud study emanating from the cheder and the ecstatic spirituality of Chasidim." More so than the word "Judaism," the word 'Yiddishkeit' evokes the Eastern European world and has an authentic ring to it. "Judaism suggests an ideology, a set of definite beliefs like socialism, conservatism or atheism. The suffix -keit in German, on the other hand, means -ness in English, which connotes a way of being. ... Not merely a creed but an organic and all-encompassing, pulsing, breathing way of life."

== Culture ==
Lack of understanding concepts of the Yiddish way of life have been compared to "kissing through a screen door."

From a more secular perspective, it is associated with the popular culture or folk practices of Yiddish-speaking Jews, such as popular religious traditions, Eastern European Jewish cuisine, Yiddish humor, shtetl life, and klezmer music, among other things.

== History ==
Before the Haskalah and the Jewish emancipation in Europe, central to Yiddishkeit were Torah study and Talmudical studies for men, and a family and communal life governed by the observance of halakha (Jewish religious laws) for men and women. Among Haredi Jews of Eastern European descent, comprising the majority of Jews who still speak Yiddish in their everyday lives, the word has retained this meaning.

But with secularization, Yiddishkeit has come to encompass not just traditional Jewish religious practice, but a broad range of movements, ideologies, practices, and traditions in which Ashkenazi Jews have participated and retained their sense of "Jewishness." Yiddishkeit has been identified in manners of speech, in styles of humor, in patterns of association, in culture and education. Another quality often associated with Yiddishkeit is an emotional attachment and identification with the Jewish people.

== See also ==
- Jewish atheism
- Jewish secularism
- Jewish culture
- Jewish life cycle
- The Joys of Yiddish
- Pintele Yid
- Who is a Jew?
- Yiddishkeit (TV series)
