= Los Siete de la Raza =

Group of youths accused of killing a police officer

Los Siete de la Raza (The Seven of the Hispanic Community) was the label given to seven young Latinos from the Mission District of San Francisco, California who were involved in a 1969 altercation with police that left one officer dead. The incident and its subsequent trial became a cause célèbre of the Latin-American community and the New Left. All seven of the young men were acquitted.

== Incident ==
On May 1, 1969, plainclothes police officers Joseph Brodnik and Paul McGoran approached a group of young Latino men as they had been called in relation to a burglary. The officers approached the young men while they were loading a television into a car from the home of Jose Rios. The police officers and the group of young men had an altercation which resulted in a fight and prompted the officers to call for backup. During the fight, a shot was fired from McGoran's gun. The fatal shot resulted in the death of officer Brodnik. The group of Latinos ran from the scene and a search for them commenced. McGoran believed the young men were hiding at an address nearby. The police stormed the nearby home in which the Rios family resided, it was then tear gassed and shots were fired. One-hundred and fifty rounds were fired, wounding one 14-year-old girl. The police started interrogating the Rios family along with people in the neighborhood to find the alleged suspects.

The interrogation and hunt made community relations worse as officer McGoran identified Jose Rios as one of the young men involved in the incident. In the following days six young men, Nelson Rodriguez, Mario Martinez, Tony Martinez, Jose Rios, Gary Lescallet, and Bebe Melendez, were arrested near Santa Cruz. Another young man, Gio Lopez, was still being sought. After the arrests of the Latino men they were charged with murder, prompting a major media phenomenon. They were defended by the activist lawyers Charles Garry and Richard Hodge, lauded by left entities like Ramparts magazine. Media accounts hindered their defense, particularly after the mayor of the city, Joseph Lawrence Alioto, described them to be "hoodlums", "Latin hippies", and "a bunch of punks". His comments sparked many Latino protests opposed to the way he depicted the community. As details of the case were brought to light, it was revealed that some of the accused men were not even present in the city at the time of the crime.

The young Latinos included four Salvadorans, one Nicaraguan, and one Honduran, some of whom had been involved in the youth group the Mission Rebels (founded in 1965); and later in pan-Latino organizations such as COBRA (Confederation of Brown Race for Action) at the College of San Mateo, and the Brown Berets, an organization that took inspiration from Black Power movements and was founded by David Sanchez and Vickie Castro.

== Trial ==
After the initial arrests, Los Siete spent several months in prison without bail. During the pre-trial, it was detailed how the young men had been subject to illegal search and seizure. Charles Garry served as an attorney during the case. The trial began in late June 1970.

The prosecution maintained that one of the youths wrested McGoran's gun from him and shot Brodnik. Officer McGoran testified that he lined them up the youths and struck one in the face; he was then jumped by "more than one assailant." The last thing he remembered hearing was Brodnik shouting, "Look out Paul, he's got your gun." The defense said McGoran pulled his gun and shot Brodnik during the struggle, and brought forth witnesses to testify to his and Brodnik's excessive use of force in previous incidents. McGoran denied drawing his gun. The defense tried to paint McGoran as a racist and alcoholic who tended to draw his gun during arrests. His estranged wife testified that her husband carried marijuana and other drugs on him that he planted on suspects to ensure their convictions.

Furthermore, throughout the sixteen weeks of the trial, Los Siete and their team presented a strong case. Four of Los Siete, Jose Rios, Mario Martinez, Tony Martinez, and Danilo "BeBe" Melendez, took the stand. Through their testimonies, they increasingly unraveled the charges made against them as each of their recollections of the incident were shown to match up. The prosecution, led by District Attorney Thomas Norman, failed to make its case and the charges made against Los Siete were dismissed.

Eventually, all seven defendants were acquitted. Yolanda López, a Chicana artist, was the designer for the poster that was used during the trial of Los Siete de la Raza.

It is also important to note that court sessions were widely attended by other young radicals, including Black Panther Huey P. Newton and two of the Chicago Seven.

== Officer background ==
Both officer McGoran and officer Brodnik grew up in the Mission District during the 1930s and 1940s. The Mission District was known for its Irish, Italian, and German immigrant populations during the early 1900s up until the late 1940s. The district's demographics changed due to the State of California's mass Latino immigration and mass immigration in general. Both men attended Mission High, and Brodnik was known for his basketball skills which ultimately led the high school to its first championship in 50 years. After Brodnik married he moved to the outskirts of the Mission District and joined the San Francisco Police Department in 1956. On the other hand, McGoran was a Vietnam Veteran and a retired United Airlines mechanic.

McGoran and Brodnik were notorious in the community. McGoran was known to be a heavy drinker and quick to draw his gun. The pair were constantly harassing the people of the neighborhood; officer Brodnik allegedly would carry a rubber hose with him although it was unclear if it was used during beatings. Their reputation was developed through the San Francisco State University strike due to the beatings they were giving protestors along with arresting them.

== Activism ==
The "Los Siete" Defense Committee, housed near 24th and South Van Ness, raised support for the seven Mission District youths and obtained assistance from the Black Panther Party. The Defense Committee served as the catalyst for other community groups in the area. The La Raza Information Center, one of the groups that emerged from the Defenese Committee, took inspiration from the Black Panthers and began operating in the summer of 1970 in the vacant storefront next to "Los Siete". Like the Panthers, it ran many programs, including Centro de Salud, which offered free bilingual services that eventually put pressure on public hospitals in the area to do the same. It also ran a free breakfast program, a community newspaper, and its main program, the "Los Siete" Defense Committee.

== Connections to other activist groups ==
Huey P. Newton, co-founder of the Black Panther Party, frequently worked with Los Siete and the Brown Berets. Newton even attended some court sessions for Los Siete de la Raza's trial in June 1970. In a message written in, Basta Ya!, Huey wrote, "I want you to know that the Black Panther Party and the Black Community is behind you in your struggle 100%... It is our intention to help you in everything possible until set free."

Bobby Seale, co-founder of the Black Panther Party, described their alliances with Los Siete as particularly important. They saw that both Black and Brown activist groups had been dealing with similar issues regarding oppression and violence in the United States.
