= Carlos Montes =

Chicano and immigrant activist

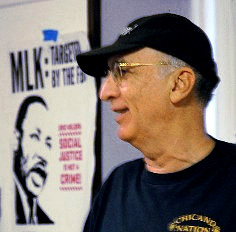
- at the San José Peace & Justice Center, February 19, 2012
- Born: December 28, 1947 (age 78); El Paso, Texas
- Education: East Los Angeles College
- Organization(s): Brown Berets; Centro CSO
- Movement: Chicano Movement
- Website: carlosmontes.org

Carlos Montes is an activist and leader in the Chicano, immigrant rights, and anti-war movements. He was a co-founder of the Brown Berets, a Chicano working-class youth organization in the United States in the late 1960s and 1970s. The Brown Berets were inspired by and often compared to the Black Panther Party. Montes was one of the leaders of the Chicano Blowouts, a series of walkouts of East Los Angeles high schools to protest against racism and inequality in Los Angeles-area high schools, and the drafting of Chicanos into the Vietnam War. He is portrayed by Fidel Gomez in the 2006 HBO movie Walkout.

== Early life and education ==
Montes was born in El Paso, Texas in 1947. He moved to Los Angeles with his family when he was seven years old, and later attended James A. Garfield High School and East Los Angeles College.

== Early political work ==
The agenda of the Brown Berets was to fight police harassment, inadequate public schools, inadequate health care, inadequate job opportunities, minority education issues, the lack of political representation, and the Vietnam War. It had a 13-point program that included self-determination for Chicanos. It set up branches in Texas, New Mexico, New York, Florida, Chicago, St. Louis and other metropolitan areas with Chicano populations.

Montes was indicted twice for the ELA Blowout (he was one of the East LA 13) and later with ten others for conspiracy to commit arson by the Los Angeles Police Department at a demonstration against then Governor Ronald Reagan in 1969. After threats against his life and beatings by the police and many arrests on false charges, he went underground and lived in Ciudad Juárez, Mexico, and later in El Paso, Texas, where he did organized labor. He was rearrested in Monterey Park, California in May 1977 and tried. However, with a competent legal defense (provided by attorneys Miguel Garcia and Steve Sanora), community support and a defense committee he was found not guilty of all charges. The Walkout indictment was dismissed as unconstitutional.

== Recent political work ==
Montes remains an activist and is a leader of Centro CSO, Legalization for All Network and Latinos Against War, a Latino anti-war organization based in Los Angeles and a member of the immigrant advocacy group the Southern California Immigration Coalition.

With the 2003 Bush administration war and occupation of Iraq, Montes helped form and lead L.A. Latinos Against War. He helped to organize protests against the September 2008 Republican National Convention in St. Paul, Minnesota.

In December 2008, Montes was a founding member of the Southern California Immigration Coalition, to fight against Immigration and Customs Enforcement (ICE) and police repression; and to organize the yearly May 1 marches and rallies to demand full legalization. He continues to fight to defend public education and helped to lead the fight to keep Garfield High School public, his alma mater in ELA. He is also currently active in the Committee to Stop FBI Repression.

On May 7, Montes along with other members of the Legalization for All Network announced their support for the Dump Trump protest. This continues Montes's work to support the anti-war movement as well as to continue his fight towards equality and justice for all. His announcement came along with a powerful statement, "Dump Trump and his racist attacks must be our call to action! His rhetoric of hate is blaming immigrants, especially Latinos, for the suffering of the working people. This suffering is in fact caused by the billionaire class that Trump represents. We say 'Dump Trump' and march on the RNC", that reassures the fight against oppression and inequality.

== Current political activity ==
Montes has been organizing against FBI raids that were deemed unnecessary which tend to focus on dismantling and preventing activist group activity through intimidation.

=== Arrest ===
On 17 May 2011, Montes was arrested following an FBI raid in his Los Angeles home. According to reports, his home was ransacked and his computer, cell phones and hundreds of documents such as photographs, diskettes and mementos of his current political activity were removed by FBI. He was arrested on one charge of dealing with a firearm code and released the following morning. A court appearance was scheduled for June 16, 2011. On June 5, 2012, Montes pleaded no contest to one count of perjury for failing to disclose his prior felony conviction on a 2010 firearm purchase form. He was sentenced to probation and community service.

== Legacy ==
Montes' papers are archived in the East Los Angeles Archives (ELAA) at the John F. Kennedy Memorial Library, California State University, Los Angeles.

== See also ==
- Chicano Moratorium
- Community Service Organization
