= East L.A. walkouts =

1968 protests by Chicano students

East Los Angeles Walkouts
- Part of the Chicano Movement
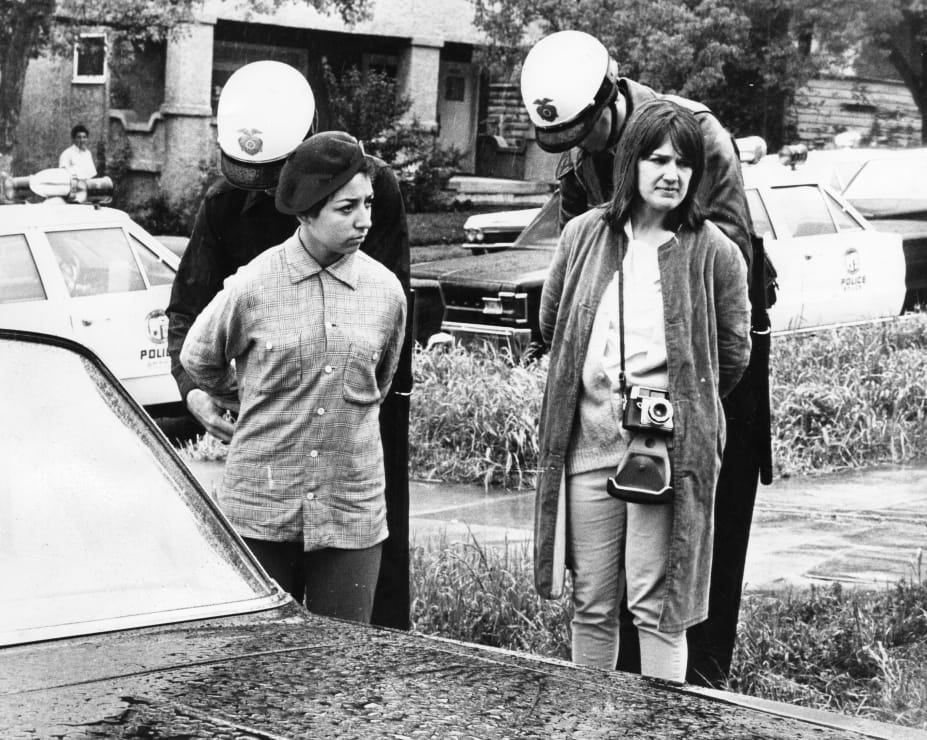
- Students activists arrested during the walkouts
- Date: March 6, 1968
- Location: Eastside Los Angeles, California
- Caused by: School conditions; Racism in the United States
- Goals: Education reform
- Methods: Walkout

Parties
Sal Castro; Harry Gamboa Jr.; Moctesuma Esparza; Carlos Montes; Vickie Castro; Paula Crisostom/o; Carlos Muñoz, Jr.	J. Edgar Hoover; US Senate Committee on the Judiciary

Casualties
- Arrested: Sal Castro; Carlos Montes

The East Los Angeles Walkouts or Chicano Blowouts were a series of 1968 protests by Chicano students against unequal conditions in Los Angeles Unified School District high schools. The first walkout occurred on March 5, 1968. The students who organized and carried out the protests were primarily concerned with the quality of their education. This movement, which involved thousands of students in the Los Angeles area, was identified as "the first major mass protest against racism undertaken by Mexican-Americans in the history of the United States".

The day before the walkouts began, Federal Bureau of Investigation director J. Edgar Hoover sent a memo to local law enforcement to prioritize "political intelligence work to prevent the development of nationalist movements in minority communities". For his part in organizing the walkouts, Harry Gamboa Jr. was named "one of the hundred most dangerous and violent subversives in the United States" by the US Senate Committee on the Judiciary, shared by activists such as Angela Davis, Eldridge Cleaver, and Reies Tijerina, and his activities was deemed "anti-establishment, anti-white, and militant".

== Background ==
During the 1950s and 1960s, Chicanos took part in the national quest for civil rights, fighting court battles and building social and political movements. Chicano youth in particular became politicized, having taken advantage of many opportunities their parents never had. This became known as the Chicano movement, similar to the civil rights movement but for Chicano individuals battling for equality and power.

In a radio interview, Moctesuma Esparza, one of the original walkout organizers, talked about his experiences as a high school student fighting for Chicano rights. Esparza first became involved in activism in 1965 after attending a youth leadership conference. He helped organize a group of Chicano teenagers, Young Citizens for Community Action. This group eventually evolved into Young Chicanos For Community Action, then later as the Brown Berets, still fighting for Chicano equality in California. Esparza graduated 12th grade in 1967, and enrolled at the University of California, Los Angeles (UCLA), where he and fellow Chicano students continued organizing protests. At the same time, he and 11 friends started a group called United Mexican American Students (UMAS), whose goal was to increase Chicano enrollment in colleges. Soon, UMAS shifted its strategy by splitting up into smaller groups, with each group to mentor students at the L.A. high schools with both high minority enrollment and high drop-out rates. Garfield, Roosevelt, Lincoln, Belmont, and Wilson high schools (all of which were involved in the walkouts) had some of the highest dropout rates in the city. Garfield had the highest rate in the city at 58%, with Roosevelt in second at 45%.

The same conditions that led to these astronomical drop-out rates were the chief motive of the walkouts. Both faculty and administration were short-staffed, leading to 40-student classes and a school counselor with 4,000 students. Classroom materials, especially in history classes, painted over Chicano history. The school curricula were Eurocentric and students were taught only from white perspectives in American history while ignoring the racial differences in the country. The majority of teachers held their own students in belittling contempt. This attitude was reflected in a letter written by a teacher at Lincoln High School, Richard Davis:

Most of the Chicanos have never had it so good. Before the Spanish came, he was an Indian grubbing in the soil, and after the Spaniards came, he was a slave. It seems to me that America must be a very desirable place, witness the number of "wetbacks" and migrants both legal and illegal from Mexico.

To improve these conditions, the students decided to organize. Esparza, Larry Villalvazo, and a few other UMAS members, along with teacher Sal Castro, helped organize hundreds of students to walk out of classes in the 1968 protests to highlight the conditions that they faced. As the protests grew, they gained the attention of the school board, which agreed to meet with students and listen to their demands.

Another leading female role in the walkouts was Victoria "Vickie" Castro. Castro was born in East Los Angeles and attended a high school in East Los Angeles in the early 1960s. She then went to attend UCLA, where she was approached by Sal Castro to attend a youth conference to bring young, educated Chicanos together and bring awareness of their fight and struggles. With David Sanchez, she was a founding member of the Brown Berets and also held meetings at their coffee shop, La Piranya. According to Sal Castro, "I knew both Vickie and David because both had attended one of the Camp Hess Kramer conferences and were impressive young people. As a result of their experiences at the conference, they became more political." Vickie Castro later said of these conferences, "This is where I got my voice. This is where my passion for justice was born in me. It changed my whole being."

== Walkouts ("Blowouts") ==
On March 1, 1968, the first students to walk out were from Wilson High School, located in East Los Angeles, an area heavily populated by working-class Mexican American families. At the time, Wilson had among the highest dropout rates of any LA-area high school with a graduation rate of 50%. Chicano students faced overcrowded classrooms, outdated textbooks, a lack of academic counseling and widespread discouragement from pursuing college. Though organizers had been planning for several months to stage walkouts to demonstrate against unsatisfactory conditions, the first blowout at Wilson was unplanned, precipitated by the principal cancelling a student-produced play that was deemed too risqué for the students to perform. In reality, the play tackled real social issues that many Chicano youth faced. Feeling silenced and disrespected, 200-300 students participated in walkout despite the disciplinary. The spontaneous act of resistance ignited momentum for the larger, organized protest that would spread across East Los Angeles. On March 5th, 1968, a more organized protest erupted at Garfield High School, where approximately 2,000 students walked out of class. Student activists had coordinated with community leaders and sympathetic teachers to prepare for action. This time, the walkout was deliberate and structured, including chants, prepared signs, and a public list of demands. When authorities attempted to block the protest by calling in police officers, it escalated tensions and drew greater media attention. By the end of the week, an estimated 15,000 to 20,000 students had walked out across seven high school campuses: Wilson, Garfield, Roosevelt, and Lincoln—where 75% of the student bodies were Chicano—as well as Belmont, Jefferson, and Venice in other parts of Los Angeles. The walkouts demonstrated the students' collective frustration and their growing political consciousness, influenced by the broader civil rights and antiwar movements of the 1960s. The students' timing was strategic: school funds from the state were based on daily student attendance. Organizers intentionally encouraged students to leave before homeroom attendance was taken, meaning that every absent student represented lost revenue for the school district. The goal was not only to physically demonstrate student dissatisfaction but also to apply financial pressure on school administrators and the Los Angeles Board of Education, forcing them to address the activists' demands.

One of the most prominent figures to emerge from the movement was Vickie Castro, a political activist and former Roosevelt High School student. Castro had grown up experiencing firsthand the systemic neglect of Chicano students in LA schools. After graduating from UCLA, she noticed how few of her peers from East L.A. had made it to higher education. This realization fueled her passion for change. Castro became a founding member of the Brown Berets, a militant Chicano rights group inspired by the Black Panther Party. The Brown Berets advocated not just for educational reform, but also for farmworkers' rights, an end to police brutality, Chicano political representation, and opposition to the Vietnam War, which disproportionately conscripted young Mexican American men. In March 1968, school districts in the East Los Angeles area were noted as being "run down campuses, with a lack of college prep courses, and teachers who were poorly trained, indifferent, or racist." Castro was a leading force in organizing the blowouts.

On March 6, 1968, Castro entered Lincoln High School pretending to be applying for a teaching position. She quickly bombarded the school principal with questions to distract him while organizers entered the school. Other organizers entered the school to convince students to leave the campus. She then went to Roosevelt High School, where she had been a student, with an intention of carrying out the same plan. However, a teacher recognized her and threatened to call the police if she did not leave the premises. She then offered her car to pull down a chain-linked fence, which had been set up to prevent organizers from entering the school.

== Student demands ==
Following the walkouts, participating students from the five East LA high schools were able to meet with the Los Angeles Board of Education. At this meeting, student leaders presented a list of thirty-nine demands that called for systemic reforms to address inequities in public education for Chicano students.

=== Academic demands ===
A) In-service education programs will be instituted immediately for all staff in order to teach them the Spanish language and increase their understanding of the history, traditions, and contributions of the Mexican culture.

B) All administrators in the elementary and secondary schools in these areas will become proficient in the Spanish language. Participants are to be compensated during the training period at not less than $8.80 an hour, and upon completion of the course, will receive, in addition to their salary, not less than $100.00 a month. The monies for these programs will come from local funds, state funds, and matching federal funds.

Key demands

- "No student or teacher will be reprimanded or suspended for participating in any efforts which are executed for the purpose of improving or furthering the educational quality in our schools."
- Bilingual and bi-cultural education will be compulsory for Chicanos in the Los Angeles Unified School District, where there is a majority of Chicano students. This program will be open to all other students on a voluntary basis."
- Administrators and teachers who show any form of prejudice toward Mexican or Chicano students, including failure to recognize, understand, and appreciate Mexican culture and heritage, will be removed from East Los Angeles schools. This will be decided by a Citizens Review Board selected by the Educational Issues Committee.
- Textbooks and curriculum will be developed to show Mexican and Chicano contributions to the U.S. society and to show the injustices that Mexicans have suffered as a culture of that society. Textbooks should concentrate on Mexican folklore rather than English folklore.
- All administrators where schools that have a majority of Chicano descent shall be of Chicano descent. If necessary, training programs should be instituted to provide a cadre of Chicano administrators.
- Every teacher's ratio of failure per student in his classroom shall be made available to community groups and students. Any teacher having a particularly high percentage of the total school dropouts in his classes shall be rated by the Citizens Review Board, composed of the Educational Issues Committee.
- Class size must be reduced so teachers can devote more time to individual students. Team teaching should be used.
- Counselor-student ratios must be reduced and counselors must speak Spanish and have a knowledge of Mexican cultural heritage.
- Students must not be grouped into slow, average, and rapid ability groups and classes based on the poor tests currently in use that often mistake a language problem with lack of intelligence. A more effective testing system for determining IQ must be developed.

=== Administrative demands ===
- Schools should have a manager to take care of paperwork and maintenance supervision. Administrators will direct the Education standards of the School instead of being head janitors and office clerks as they are today.
- School facilities should be made available for community activities under the supervision of Parents' Councils (not PTA). Recreation programs for children will be developed.
- No teacher will be dismissed or transferred because of their political views and/or philosophical disagreements with administrators.
- Community parents will be engaged as teachers' aides. Orientation similar to in-service training, will be provided, and they will be given status as semi-professionals, as in the new careers concept.

=== Facilities demands ===
- The Industrial Arts program must be revitalized. Students need proper training to use the machinery of modern-day industry. Up-to-date equipment and new operational techniques must replace the obsolescent machines and outmoded training methods currently being employed in this program. If this high standard cannot be met, the Industrial Arts program will be de-emphasized.
- New high schools in the area must be immediately built. The new schools will be named by the community. At least two Senior High Schools and at least one Junior High School must be built. Marengo Street School must be reactivated to reduce the student-teacher load at Murchison Street School.
- Library facilities will be expanded in all East Los Angeles high schools. At present, the libraries in these high schools do not meet the educational needs of the students. Sufficient library materials will be provided in Spanish.
- All bathrooms are to remain unlocked at all times.
- Cafeteria menus should have more Mexican dishes, and mothers should be hired as kitchen staff and allowed to help prepare the food.

== Timeline ==
March 1, 1968: Wilson High School was the first high school to have a walkout. About 300 students walked out, which was the catalyst for the East L.A Walkout. The administration attempted to create a blockade in the main exit, but resilient students found the auditorium door and exited the school through its entry gates. Other students protested from the inside by throwing fruit, books, and other items over the gate to show support. Policemen showed up to the scene to force students back into classrooms, however, students refused until demands were met.

March 5, 1968: Garfield High School walked out—about 2,000 students were in attendance at this walkout.

March 6, 1968: Lincoln, Roosevelt, and Garfield High Schools also joined the walkouts, with about 4,500 students in attendance of the walkouts.

March 7, 1968: Garfield and Belmont High Schools walked out with about 2,000 students in attendance.

March 8, 1968: Lincoln, Roosevelt, and Garfield High Schools all walked out. About 5,000 students were in attendance. This day, there was also a rally held at Hazard Park with Nava and Roybal speaking at this walkout event. Protestors carried signs reading "Chicano Power" and "Viva la Raza." Over 15,000 Chicanos, students, faculty, and community members, walk out of seven East L.A. high schools. Those schools included: Garfield, Roosevelt, Lincoln, Belmont, Wilson, Venice, and Jefferson High School. Some students from East L.A. junior high schools join the protests, as well. This all gained traction from activists who were demanding social change and greater educational opportunities for Chicano/a students.

March 11, 1968: The Chicano community (students, faculty, parents, and activists) began to organize and create the Educational Issues Coordinating Committee (EICC). They intended to demonstrate the needs and concerns of those who participated in the walkouts at the Los Angeles County Board of Education meeting, the Board later agreed.

March 28, 1968: The meeting between the Los Angeles Board of Education and the Educational Issues Coordinating Committee takes place. Over 1,200 community members attend the meeting, and the EICC got to present their 39 demands from the Board. The Board denied the demands and the students walked out of the meeting.

March 31, 1968: Thirteen of the Chicano walkout organizers were arrested, also known as the Eastside 13 for conspiracy to start the walkouts. Among those arrested were high school students, college students, organizers from the Brown Berets, editors of La Raza newspaper, and other organizers from the United Chicano Students organization. Students and community members immediately organized a protest around the Hall of Justice in Downtown LA to ask for the release of the LA 13. They were supported by Senator Robert Kennedy, Cesar Chavez, and Students for a Democratic Society. Only 12 of the 13 arrestee were released; Sal Castro, a teacher and key organizer of the walkouts, held the most charges and was held in detention the longest.

June 2, 1968: Sal Castro was released on bail, but lost his teaching position at Lincoln High School due to the arrest. 2,000 people protested outside of the police station to demand he get his teaching position back.

September–October 1968: Students and community members organized round-the-clock sit-ins at the LA Board office until Sal Castro could be reinstated for his teaching position. 35 supporters sat at the Board offices for eight days until they were arrested on October 2. The board eventually allowed Castro to resume his position.

== Aftermath ==
Many of the student organizers became prominent in their fields. Moctesuma Esparza, one of the thirteen charged with disrupting the schools, who became known as the East L.A. 13, later became a film producer. He helped recruit more Chicanos to Hollywood. Harry Gamboa Jr. became an artist and writer. Carlos Montes, a Brown Berets minister, was charged with arson at a hotel during the Chicano Moratorium protest against the Vietnam War; after fleeing the country, he eventually faced trial and was acquitted. Paula Crisostomo became a school administrator, where she continues to fight for reform. Vickie Castro was elected to the Los Angeles Los Angeles Unified School District Board of Education. Carlos Muñoz, Jr., went on to a teaching and research career at the University of California, Berkeley. Carlos R. Moreno, who participated in the Camp Hess Kramer conference, went on to study law and eventually became a judge for the Supreme Court of California.

The student actions of 1968 inspired later protests that used similar tactics, including the 1994 student walkouts against California Proposition 187, the 2006 student walkouts against H.R. 4437, the 2009 walkouts against Arizona SB 1070, and the 2007 walkouts in support of the proposed Cesar Chavez holiday. Additionally, many films, documentaries, biographies, and more have been produced as a result of the walkouts; some of the projects contain a direct recounting of the Blowouts while others tell similar, loosely based stories. Some films include Stand and Deliver, Freedom Writers, and Precious Knowledge.

The walkouts also inspired a massive cultural awakening among the Chicano/a community. Many Latinos who were forced to assimilate into the American lifestyle began to embrace their Chicano/a identity. This sparked the uptick in the creation of Chicano/a Studies. Universities like UCLA started a Mexican American Studies program, which is also known as Chicana/o Studies. Carlos Munoz Jr. played a key role in the creation of this program. Today, over 400 universities and colleges have programs studying Latina/o/xs in the United States and their extensive history. As of 2019, the enrollment in Chicano studies at UCLA is still growing, increasing over 40% in just 18 months.

== See also ==
- Walkout (film)

== Sources ==
- Castro, Sal; Garcia, Mario T. (2011). Blowout! Sal Castro and the Chicano Struggle for Educational Justice. North Carolina University Press. ISBN 9780807834480. JSTOR 10.5149/9780807877913_garcia.
- Castro, Victoria (1986). Resume.
- Chicano Power and the Brown Berets. October 11, 2011.
- Delgado Bernal, Dolores (1998). "Grassroots leadership reconceptualized: Chicana oral histories and the 1968 East Los Angeles school blowouts". Frontiers: A Journal of Women Studies. 19 (2). Frontiers: 113–142. doi:10.2307/3347162. JSTOR 3347162.
- Rosales, F. Arturo (1997). Chicano! The History of the Mexican American Civil Rights Movement. Arte Público Press. ISBN 978-1558852013.
