= Salvador Castro =

Salvador Castro is the name of:

- Salvador Castaneda Castro (1888–1965), former President of El Salvador
- Sal Castro (1933–2013), American educator and activist
