= Theodore Roosevelt High School (Los Angeles) =

Public high school in California, United States

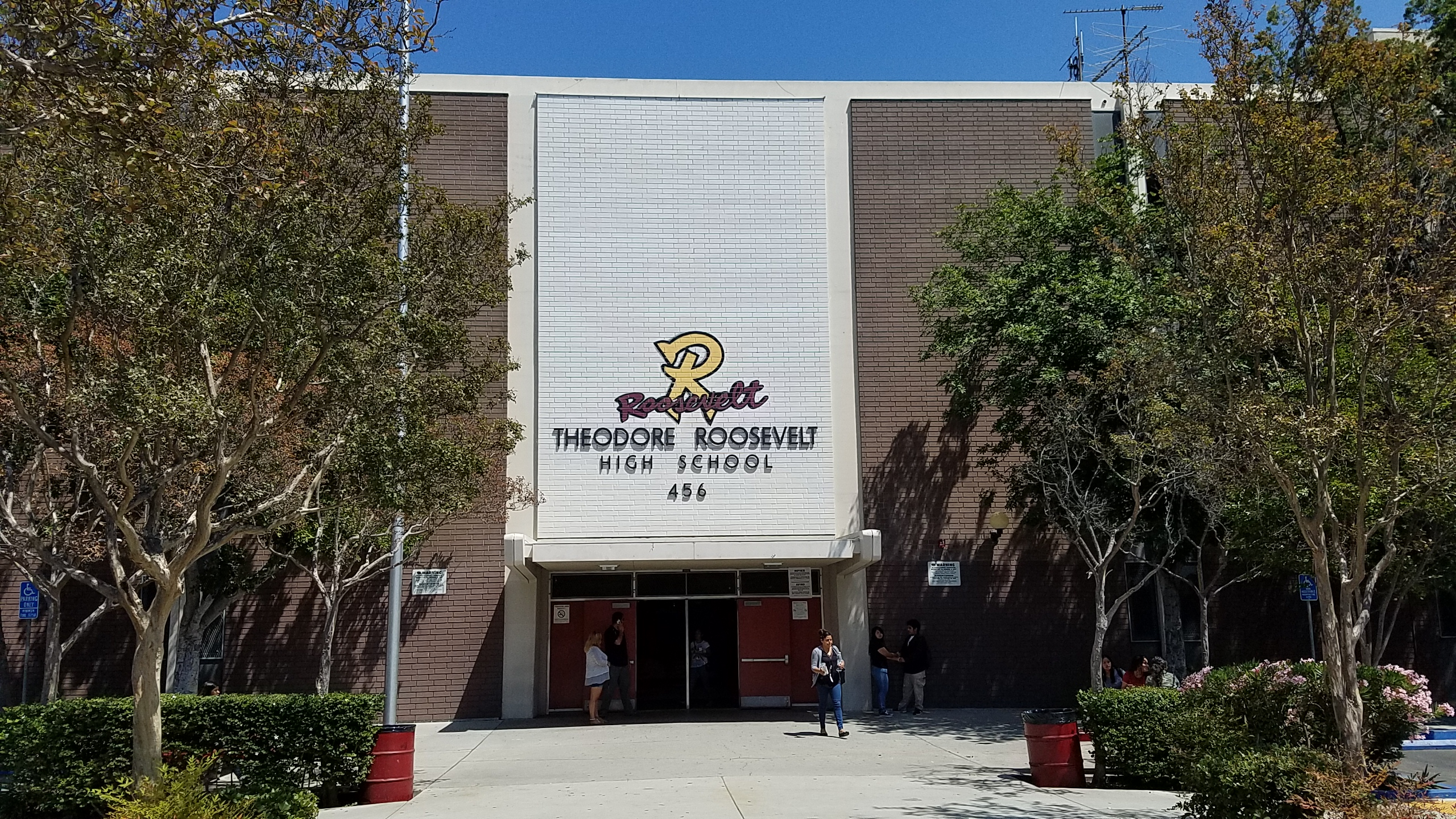

Location
- 456 South Matthews Street, Los Angeles, California, United States 90033; 34°02′18″N 118°12′40″W

Information
- Type: Public
- Motto: "Don't flinch, don't foul, hit the line hard!"
- Established: 1922
- School district: Los Angeles Unified School District
- Principal: Ben Gertner
- Staff: 85.23 (FTE)
- Grades: 9–12
- Student to teacher ratio: 19.08
- Colors: Cardinal & Gold
- Athletics conference: Eastern League; CIF Los Angeles City Section
- Mascot: Teddy the Bear
- Nickname: Rough Riders
- Rivals: Garfield High School
- Newspaper: Teddy Times
- Website: Official website

Theodore Roosevelt High School is an educational institution (grades 9–12) located in the Boyle Heights area of Los Angeles, California, named for the 26th president of the United States.

Roosevelt is a public school in the Los Angeles Unified School District with an enrollment of 1,400 as of 2017. The enrollment peaked at 5,047 in 2007, making it one of the largest in the country, and second largest behind Belmont High School at the time. From the mid-1990s until the 2008–09 school year, the school followed a year-round calendar. In 2008, the school started to be managed by the Partnership for Los Angeles Schools, which was established by Los Angeles Mayor Antonio Villaraigosa. In 2010, the single institution was split up into seven small schools, each with its own principal, CEEB code (used by SAT, colleges, etc.), students and staff. The outcomes of this were debated by students and administrators. Since 2013, Roosevelt has been merged into a single comprehensive high school. The Roosevelt campus also hosts the Math, Science and Technology Magnet Academy at Roosevelt High School and the STEM Academy of Boyle Heights, an LAUSD Pilot School that was formed in 2014.

Its school colors are red and gold, the mascot is Teddy the Bear, and their sport teams are known as the Rough Riders. The school's motto is "Don't flinch, don't foul, hit the line hard!", which is a Theodore Roosevelt quote.

Most students come from Boyle Heights, with some traveling from South Central, East Los Angeles, and City Terrace.

Roosevelt participates in the annual "East L.A. Classic" against Garfield High School. It is the homecoming game for both schools and attracts over 20,000 people every year.

The school's $173 million comprehensive modernization project began in 2018.

== History ==
Roosevelt was founded in 1922, but opened in 1923 in Boyle Heights to the east of the Los Angeles River.

Roosevelt High School became categorized as a “Mexican school” along with Lincoln High School, Garfield High School, and others near East L.A. This categorization derived in the twentieth century when an abundance of Mexican immigrants enrolled in public schools and school boards segregated the establishments. Nearly 83 percent of Roosevelt's students were of Mexican descent.

As the population grew in the area, Roosevelt sought expansion. The R-Building (R for Roosevelt) was the main building and faced Fickett Street. The street was vacated and a new administration (A-Building for administration) was constructed. Many new buildings were created and added to campus. The R-building has an interesting history and distinct architecture. There was a fourth floor to the building which had to be closed due to damage from a fire. The basement was built with a shooting range for the Junior ROTC (JROTC), although only air rifles may be used now.

Roosevelt was one of the five schools to initiate the student walkouts in 1968, and contributed to the walkouts in 2006, in protest to the HR 4437 bill. The school has partnered with Planned Parenthood, which operates a clinic at the school providing birth control, pregnancy testing, screening for sexually transmitted diseases and counseling, in an effort to reduce the area's high incidence of teenage pregnancies.

In 2009, the opening of the Felicitas and Gonzalo Mendez Learning Centers helped to expand Roosevelt.

== East LA Walkouts ==
The East LA Walkouts or Blowouts were a result of long endured injustices involving students at East LA high schools. The curriculum of "Mexican schools" was designed to prepare its students to eventually join the working-class in place of their parents because graduation rates were so low. The Watts Riots of 1965 proved to students that resistance was necessary for social changes. Students were determined to change the curriculum and as the Chicano Movement was taking place, Sal Castro, a teacher at Lincoln High School, organized the East L.A. Walkouts. Approximately 10,000 students from Roosevelt, Lincoln, Belmont, Garfield, and Wilson High Schools participated with support from teachers, parents, college students, and community members.

With Castro's help, students from the high schools formed a central committee to plan actions. After the principal at Wilson High School cancelled the senior class play on March 1, 1968, enraged students participated in an impromptu walkout. This situation called for a central committee meeting to decide whether all schools would engage in a larger walkout. However, Garfield High students decided for themselves and staged a campus-wide walkout on March 5. Shortly after, walkouts ensued at Roosevelt and Lincoln. The last walkout took place on March 8 and ended at Hazard Park which is a short distance from Roosevelt High School.

== Japanese American internment camps ==
When Japan bombed Pearl Harbor in December 1941, Japanese Americans were forced into internment camps to prevent them from turning on the United States. They were given orders to drop all belongings and expect to be taken away from their communities until further notice. Nearly a third of Roosevelt High School's students were withdrawn because they were Japanese. They were required to attend schools within those camps. However, resources were scarce and classes were limited.

In 1937, prior to their withdrawal from Roosevelt High School, the Japanese American Students Club created a Japanese Garden on campus. The garden was not maintained during World War II, which led to its deterioration. It was rebuilt in 1996 and dedicated to Japanese American students who were victims of displacement during the war.

== Demographics ==
Demographics of student body
Ethic Breakdown	2021	2020	2019
American Indian/Alaskan Native	0%	0.1%	0.1%
Hispanic and Latino American	99%	99%	98%
African American	0.3%	0.3%	0.4%
Asian American	0.5%	0.2%	0.3%
Native Hawaiian or other Pacific Islander	0%	0%	0.1%
White	1%	1%	1%
Multiracial Americans	0%	0.1%	0.1%
Female	47%	46%	46%
Male	53%	54%	54%

In 2019, Roosevelt serves around 1,475 students in grades nine through twelve, with a student-teacher ratio of 19:1 and 79 full-time teachers.

=== All Rankings ===
US News 2021 Rankings

- 102 in Los Angeles Unified School District High Schools
- 381 in Los Angeles metropolitan area High Schools
- 1,129 in California High Schools
- 9,994 in National Rankins

US News 2020 Rankings

- 164 in Los Angeles Unified School District High Schools
- 376 in Los Angeles metropolitan area High Schools
- 1,144 in California High Schools
- 10,680 in National Rankins

US News 2019 Rankings

- 333 in Los Angeles metropolitan area High Schools
- 974 in California High Schools
- 7,852 in National Rankings

== Academic Performance Index (API) ==
API for high schools in the LAUSD District 5 and local small public charter high schools in the East Los Angeles region.

School	2007	2008	2009	2010	2011	2012	2013
Francisco Bravo Medical Magnet High School	807	818	815	820	832	842	847
Marc and Eva Stern Math and Science School	718	792	788	788	809	785	775
Oscar De La Hoya Animo Charter High School	662	726	709	710	744	744	738
James A. Garfield High School	553	597	593	632	705	710	714
Abraham Lincoln High School	594	609	588	616	643	761	738
Woodrow Wilson High School	582	585	600	615	636		
Theodore Roosevelt High School	557	551	576	608		793	788
Thomas Jefferson High School	457	516	514	546	546		
Santee Education Complex		502	521	552	565	612	636

== The East LA Classic ==
The East L.A. Classic is the homecoming game for Roosevelt High School and Garfield High School, . The classic has taken place since a few years after the opening of the two schools, with the exception of the Depression and World War II. The classic brings out alumni from all parts of the world, usually fielding 20,000 people per game and has been held at the East Los Angeles College at the Weingart Stadium although it has been held at the Los Angeles Memorial Coliseum.

== Artwork ==
The artist Nelyollotl Toltecatl painted a 400 feet (120 m) mural, known as the Anahuac Mural, on two outside walls of Roosevelt depicting murder, rape, and enslavement of Native Americans by European colonizers. In 1996 Toltecatl, who was previously known under a Spanish name, began to work on a mural intended to depict Chicano history and assimilation. After about a year of work on the project, the tone of his mural changed after attending a lecture by Olin Tezcatlipoca.

Prior to the demolition of the Sixth Street Viaduct, Los Angeles mayor Eric Garcetti recorded the R&B song "101SlowJam", backed by musicians from Roosevelt High School, and issued it via a video on his own YouTube channel. The public service announcement video advertised the closure of parts of the 101 Freeway to accommodate the demolition of the viaduct.

== Notable alumni ==
- Chris Arreola - professional heavyweight boxer
- Lou Adler – Grammy Award winner and film producer; noted for Rocky Horror Picture Show and Up in Smoke
- Sam Balter (1909–1998) – All-American basketball player UCLA; gold medalist in 1936 Summer Olympics; member of SCSBA Hall of Fame
- Paul Bannai – first Japanese-American assemblyman in California
- Leo Buscaglia - writer and professor
- Lynn Cain – USC running back, played for Atlanta Falcons and Los Angeles Rams
- Leo Cantor (1919–1995) - NFL football player
- Phil Carreón (1923–2010), big-band leader who gave Lennie Niehaus his first job as arranger and alto saxophonist
- Vickie Castro - educator
- Gil Cedillo – California state senator
- Willie Davis (1940-2010) – MLB outfielder for Los Angeles Dodgers 1960–72; 2-time All-Star and 2-time World Series champion
- Mike Davis - American writer, historian, and political theorist; Author of City of Quartz
- Philip "Phil" Erenberg (1909–1992) - gymnast and Olympic silver medalist
- Felipe Esparza - Stand-up comedian
- Michael Galitzen (Mickey Riley) – 1932 Summer Olympics gold medalist, springboard diving
- Mike Garrett – football player, Heisman Trophy winner for USC 1965; later USC athletic director
- Joe Gold – founder of Gold's Gym
- Paul Gonzales – first Mexican-American winner of boxing gold medal, 1984 Summer Olympics
- William Harmatz (1931–2011) - Thoroughbred horse racing jockey
- Frances Hashimoto - former president and CEO of Mikawaya, credited as creator of mochi ice cream and introducing it to American consumer market
- Genaro Hernandez – world junior lightweight champion 1991–1994
- Robert Kinoshita – artist, art director, set and production designer in film and television from 1950s-'80s
- Herbert G. Klein - President Richard Nixon's communications director for executive branch
- Julian Nava - Los Angeles Unified School District Board of Education, U.S. Ambassador to Mexico
- Lennie Niehaus – Emmy Award winner and Clint Eastwood's musical director
- Eugene Obregon – Medal of Honor in Korean War
- Harry Pregerson – first Jewish American appointed federal circuit judge, 9th Circuit Court of Appeals
- Myron Prinzmetal - cardiologist
- Ricky Romero – All-City Player of the Year; pitcher for Toronto Blue Jays
- Edward R. Roybal – LA city councilman 1949–62; U.S. House of Representatives 1963–1993
- Andy Russell - born as "Andrés Rábago" in Boyle Heights, Los Angeles, 1940s Mexican-American crooner of hits "Bésame Mucho" and "What a Diff'rence a Day Made"; later an international singing star in Mexico, Latin America, and Spain
- Shirlee Smith - author
- Donald Sterling - former owner of NBA's Los Angeles Clippers
- A. Wallace Tashima – first Japanese-American appointed federal circuit judge, 9th Circuit Court of Appeals
- Bobbi Trout – record-setting aviator of 1930s and 1940s, contemporary of Amelia Earhart and Pancho Barnes
- Antonio Villaraigosa – Mayor of Los Angeles, 2005–13
- Harold M. Williams – Chairman of Securities and Exchange Commission during Carter administration; president emeritus of Getty Center
- Howard Zieff – film director, Private Benjamin, House Calls, My Girl
