= Sal Castro =

American schoolteacher (1933–2013)

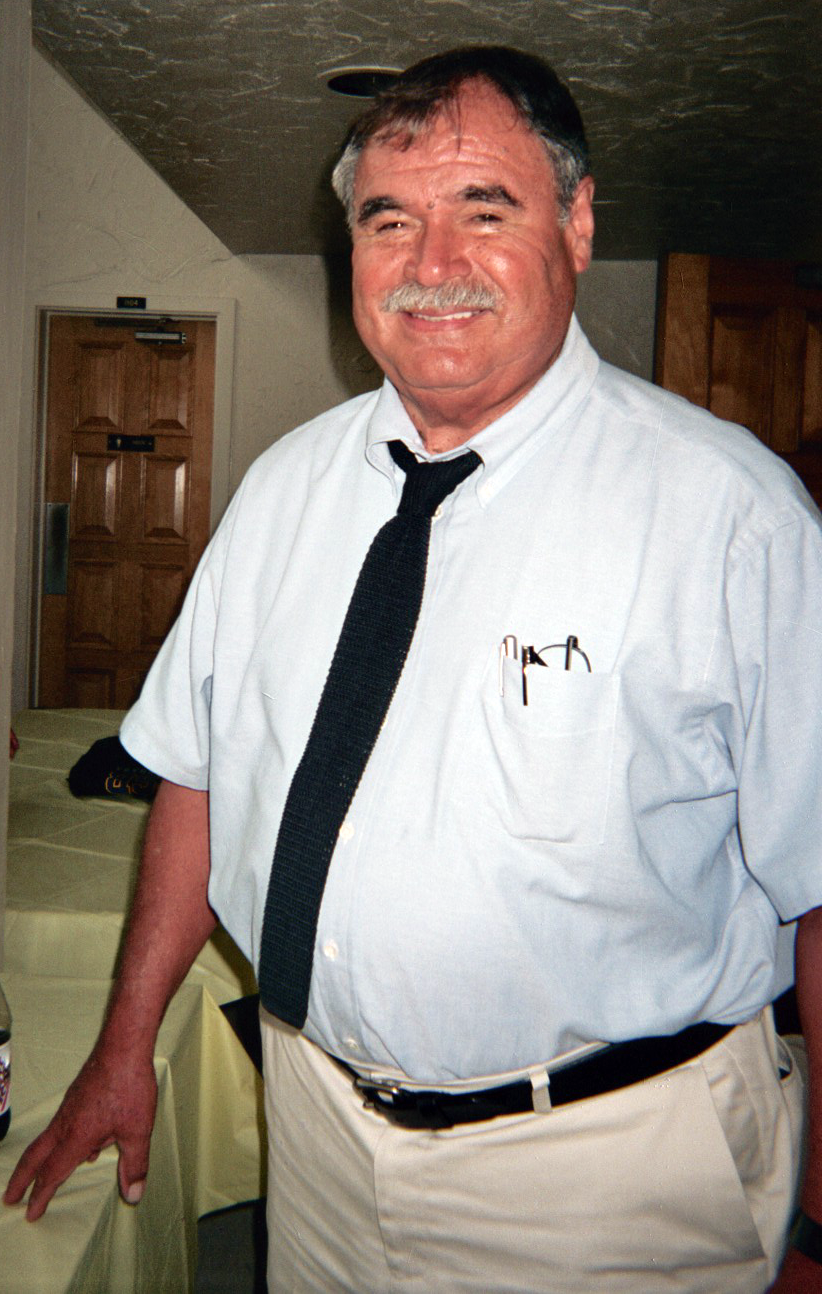
- At the May 17, 2006 screening of Walkout in the Isla Vista Theatre in Isla Vista, California
- Born: October 25, 1933; Boyle Heights, Los Angeles
- Died: April 15, 2013 (aged 79); Silver Lake, Los Angeles
- Occupation: Teacher
- Known for: East Los Angeles high school walkouts

Salvador B. Castro (October 25, 1933 – April 15, 2013) was a Mexican-American educator and activist. He was most well known for his role in the 1968 East Los Angeles high school walkouts, a series of protests against unequal conditions in Los Angeles Unified School District (LAUSD) schools. After he retired from teaching, he continued to lecture about his experiences and the importance of education, especially for Mexican Americans.

== Early life and education ==
Castro was born in Los Angeles and began kindergarten at Belvedere Elementary School in East Los Angeles, but moved to Mexico when his father was forcibly repatriated during the "Repatriation Movement". There he attended a private elementary school in Mazatlán, Sinaloa. Returning to East L.A. while still in grade school, he experienced discrimination for speaking Spanish in the classroom. After graduating from Cathedral High School, a Catholic school, he was drafted into the Army. He saw no combat action as hostilities with Korea ceased shortly after his entry, but was stationed at bases in Atlanta, Georgia and Fort Jackson, South Carolina. Always interested in higher education, he was particularly impressed by the campus of College of William and Mary while stationed in Virginia but he left the Army to marry his high school sweetheart, and attended Los Angeles City College (LACC) before transferring to L.A. State, later known as California State University Los Angeles (Cal State LA) where he obtained his B.A. in social science.

== Career and activism ==
Around 1956, while still a student at LACC, he got his first job in the educational field, as an assistant playground director in the inner city neighborhood school. He held various positions in the Los Angeles-area schools before being hired at Belmont High School in Downtown Los Angeles as an interpreter and social studies teacher. He began coaching Mexican-American students to run for positions in student government. At a campaign assembly, candidates from the new political party addressed the student body in Spanish; when addressing the student body in Spanish was prohibited at that time. This prompted the cancellation of the assembly and the suspension of the offending students. Castro, who was ignorant of the rule, had given the go-ahead to use Spanish, and was immediately transferred to Lincoln High School in Lincoln Heights, in North East Los Angeles.

Meanwhile, Castro continued his education, undertaking a Master's program at Cal State LA. He joined the Mexican-American Education Committee, a group of graduate students who made recommendations to the Los Angeles County Board of Supervisors on ways to improve services to Mexican-American students. The only committee recommendation the supervisors acted on, however, was the creation of an "Urban Affairs Liaison", which had little effect on the quality of education in Los Angeles schools. Nonetheless, Castro began meeting informally with Mexican-American college students, who were by this time beginning to call themselves Chicanos and Chicanas, and a network of Mexican American education activists began forming.

The result of the network was the holding of Chicano Youth Leadership Conferences (CYLC), training grounds for student activists, the first of which was held in 1963. At conferences, students discussed inequalities between schools within the LAUSD, the need for bilingual and culturally relevant education, and the need for systemic reforms that would place students on the track to higher education. They founded the Piranya Café, which became the headquarters for the movement.

As Castro helped students make demands of the school board, underground newspapers floated the idea of a boycott of East L.A. schools. When district officials ignored the students' demands, calls for a boycott grew stronger. In March 1968, students from Wilson High School walked out after the school principal cancelled a performance of the Neil Simon play Barefoot in the Park. The next day, another walkout was staged in protest of a school policy prohibiting male students from wearing their hair long.

Following the small walkouts, students from the five public schools in East Los Angeles and North East Los Angeles (Roosevelt, Wilson, Lincoln, Garfield, and Belmont), with the aid of local Chicano college students (like David Sanchez and Vickie Castro), coordinated unified protests. Dubbed the "Chicano Blowouts", the first day of protests were peaceful, but the second day was marred by police violence against students from Roosevelt and Belmont high schools, who, unlike protesters at the other schools, had no protection from college students.

In the wake of the demonstrations, Castro was arrested and charged with 15 counts of conspiracy to disrupt public schools and 15 counts of conspiracy to disturb the peace. Twelve others, many of whom were Brown Berets members, were also arrested and charged. The charges were dropped in 1972.

Castro continued educating and pressing for educational reform in Los Angeles-area schools.

Anaheim's Savanna High School celebrates Sal Castro Day every March 27.

Sal Castro speaking in 1963 with the principal of Belmont High School in Los Angeles, where he was a teacher:
"You know, Mrs. Lord, more than half the kids are Latino, Mexican kids, and we've got no kids in any of the leadership positions or even this program." She said, "Mr. Castro, the Mexican kid has a charming passivity, and you tell me you want to take that away?" I said, "Oh, shit, I've got problems here."

— from "Teaching Is a Fight • An Interview with Sal Castro" (2010).

== Later activities ==
In the 2006 HBO film Walkout, Castro's role was played by Michael Peña. Edward James Olmos directed the film.

Also in 2006, Castro was highly critical of radio DJs who encouraged students to walk out of classes in protest of United States House of Representatives resolution 4437, which, if passed by the United States Senate, will impose stiffer penalties on unauthorized immigrants and their employers. While not opposed to the demonstrations themselves, Castro was concerned that those encouraging the protests did not accompany the students to protect them as he and the other organizers of the 1968 walkouts had.

He also publicly denounced the members of the Minuteman Project as racists.

Castro continued to lecture student groups across the country and helps run leadership conferences for high school students. He was a Park and Recreation Commissioner for the Los Angeles County Department of Parks and Recreation.

== Legacy ==
On October 13, 2009, the Los Angeles Board of Education voted to name a new Middle School, located on the campus of Belmont High School, Sal Castro Middle School. The school was officially dedicated on Saturday June 5, 2010 with a ribbon-cutting ceremony.

"As President Obama said when told that he had won the Nobel Peace Prize, I too am surprised and honored that a school is being named after me," said Castro, visibly moved by the honor. "It is extremely humbling for me and East L.A. kids to be put on the same list with giants of our country, including Lincoln, Jefferson, Washington, Grant, Roosevelt, and Garfield; also, Kennedy, Mendez and Ochoa. "I know that by naming a school after me you are really honoring the students who, 41 years ago, tried to improve education with their courageous walkouts," he added.

"The naming of the Middle school on the Belmont High School campus in honor of Sal Castro is much more than a token acknowledgement of his long career in education; it serves as a constant reminder to those staffing the school and to those served by the school, to strive for the model of education to which Sal Castro has devoted his entire life" said former student and mentee Carlos R. Moreno, a current California Supreme Court judge who spoke before the board in favor of naming the school after his mentor.

In 2022 Castro's alma mater Cal State LA posthumously honored him with an honorary doctorate and named its newly-inaugurated ethnic studies program for Los Angeles County teachers (Sal Castro Academy for Urban Teacher Leaders) after him.

== Personal life ==
Castro was married to his high school sweetheart Charlotte Lerchenmuller, herself a Cal State LA alumnus. They have two sons and two grandchildren. He died in Los Angeles on April 15, 2013 of thyroid cancer.
