= Garfield High School (California) =

Public high school in California, United States

James A. Garfield Senior High

Location
- 5101 E. Sixth Street; East Los Angeles, California 90022; United States; 34°1′32″N 118°9′28″W

Information
- Type: Public
- Motto: "A clear head, a true heart, a strong arm"
- Established: 1925
- Locale: Suburban, Large
- School district: Los Angeles Unified School District
- NCES District ID: 0622710
- NCES School ID: 062271003037
- Principal: Regina Marquez Martinez
- Teaching staff: 127.38 (on an FTE basis)
- Grades: 9–12
- Enrollment: 2,237 (2024–25)
  - Male: 1,134
  - Female: 1,103
- Student to teacher ratio: 17.56
- Colors: White, Blue, & Crimson
- Nickname: Bulldogs
- Rivals: Roosevelt High School
- Website: garfieldhs.org

James A. Garfield High School is a year-round public high school founded in 1925 in East Los Angeles, an unincorporated section of Los Angeles County, California. At Garfield, 38% of students participate in Advanced Placement programs. Approximately 93% of the student population comes from disadvantaged backgrounds with limited financial or social opportunities. The school maintains a comprehensive minority admission policy with a 100% minority population.

As of 2020, Garfield is one of the 254 high schools in the Los Angeles Unified School District. The high school's magnet program is dedicated to students aspiring to pursue studies in the field of Computer Science.

Garfield High School gained recognition through the film "Stand and Deliver," which tells the story of teacher Jaime Escalante, and the HBO film "Walkout." The school also hosts the annual homecoming football game known as the East LA Classic, a tradition dating back to 1925.

== History ==
James A. Garfield High School opened in September 1925 on land that was formerly used for agriculture, offering education for students in grades 7th through 12th. The school operated as a six-year institution, allowing students to earn two diplomas: one from Garfield Junior High School after completing the 9th grade, and another from Garfield Senior High School.

In 1926, uniforms were required for girls only, consisting of a navy blue pleated wool skirt, a white middy blouse with a dark blue collar and cuffs, along with the option to wear a black tie. Stockings or socks were part of the uniform and had to be worn at all times.

By the late 1930s, Garfield became overcrowded, leading to the construction of a new Junior High School for grades 7 through 9. This new school was Kern Avenue Junior High School, located on Fourth Street and Kern Avenue, which is now known as Griffith STEAM Magnet Middle School.

The Los Angeles Unified School District (LAUSD) appointed architect George M. Lindsay to design the original Romanesque Revival campus buildings. Today, one of these buildings, known as the '300 Building,' remains, though it has undergone modernization to its front.

In the 1950s and 60s, new classroom buildings were added, along with a library featuring a multistory arcade, guided by the New Formalism architectural style in the 1970s.

During World War II, students from James A. Garfield High School worked at Lockheed and Douglas aircraft plants on war-related machining and assembly projects to support the war effort, earning school credit and pay. The efforts and details about the program at Garfield High School were featured in a film created for Army and Navy servicemen and women in 1944 by the "Army–Navy Screen Magazine." In addition to their contributions to the military, dozens of Garfield students and Japanese-descendant graduates were relocated to internment camps.

At the end of World War II, the need for another city college became evident due to the large number of returning servicemen. During the 1940s, Los Angeles City College (LACC) was the sole city college, but limited and costly transportation made it difficult for many students to attend LACC. Meanwhile, the Eastside was rapidly developing into an industrial center.

To address this need, Arthur Baum, editor of the East Los Angeles Tribune, led a citizens' committee composed of presidents of various clubs and organizations in the community. They collaborated with Principal D. Raymond Brothers of Garfield, County Supervisor Smith, Superintendent Kersey, and several industrial leaders. This group presented the proposition of establishing a Junior College to the Los Angeles City Board of Education in a special meeting on March 1, 1945. The Los Angeles Board of Education voted to establish a Junior College on the Garfield High School campus, which would become East Los Angeles College (ELAC). ELAC became the second city college (or junior college) in the Los Angeles area.

Formally established by the Los Angeles City Board of Education in June 1945, East Los Angeles College opened for classes on September 4, 1945. It initially operated on the Garfield High School campus with 373 students and a faculty of nineteen, although the school board had authorized a faculty of 25, selected from the LACC faculty. Of these students, 107 attended college classes at Garfield, while 266 pursued health careers, primarily nursing, at L.A. County Hospital. The junior college was part of the Los Angeles City Public Schools (now part of the L.A. Unified School District).

The college relocated to its current 82-acre site on Avenida Cesar Chavez in February 1948. It is situated six miles from the Los Angeles Civic Center.

It remained part of the Los Angeles City High School District until 1961 when it merged into LAUSD

Garfield High School was one of the five schools that initiated student protests known as the East L.A. walkouts in 1968. On March 26, 1968, the LAUSD Board of Education convened in the auditorium at Lincoln High School to address the students' demands with community members. During this meeting, students representing each of the Eastside high schools handed over leadership to the Educational Issues Coordinating Committee (EICC). In 2006, Garfield also played a role in the walkouts, protesting against the HR 4437 bill.

In 2018, Garfield High School and the five Walkout schools were included on America's 11 Most Endangered Historic Places list by the National Trust for Historic Preservation."

Principal	
Rosco C. Ingalls	First
Reginald Murphy	During walkouts
Regina Marquez Martinez	Present

== Campus ==
On May 20, 2007, the auditorium was completely destroyed when an arsonist set fire to the 82-year-old building. A benefit concert, in collaboration with Los Lobos, was held, and a donation was provided by boxer Oscar De La Hoya.

The Los Angeles Unified School District contends that the 1925 auditorium needs to be rebuilt from the ground up to meet state building codes. However, nine insurers insist that the walls are salvageable and could support a new building, according to district officials.

The main administration building at Garfield, which is attached to the auditorium, must be retrofitted to meet earthquake standards. Officials have not yet determined the extent of demolition required."

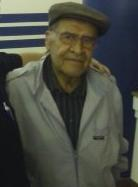
Jaime Escalante

On March 31, 2010, a day after the death of Jaime Escalante, the Los Angeles Unified School District announced that the new auditorium under construction at Garfield High would be named in his honor.

On April 1, a memorial service honoring Escalante was held at Garfield High, where he taught from 1974 to 1991. During the service, students observed a moment of silence on the front steps. Approximately 200 people attended the service, as reported by Principal Jose Huerta.

A wake in memory of Jaime Escalante was held on April 17, 2010, in the lecture hall where he taught calculus.

In July 2010, during the school's first summer vacation since 1991, the Administration Building and the remnants of the original Auditorium were demolished. By the beginning of the school year in September, the entire building had been leveled, leaving only a small power plant from the original structure. The school's 300 building is the last remaining structure that dates back to its opening in 1925.

On April 5, 2014, officials from the Los Angeles Unified School District (LAUSD) cut the ribbon for Garfield High's Auditorium project. This new facility features state-of-the-art upgrades and the newly created Jaime Escalante Memorial Plaza.

The school is renowned for its murals. In 2006, several murals were removed due to structural damage.

=== Demographics ===
Demographics of student body
Ethnic Breakdown	2022	2021	2020	2019
American Indian/Alaskan Native	Null	0.1%	0.1%	0.1%
Hispanic and Latino American	98.6%	99%	99%	99%
Black	0.6%	0.4%	0.5%	0.4%
Asian American	0.3%	0.4%	0.4%	0.3%
Native Hawaiian or other Pacific Islander	Null	0.0%	0.0%	0.0%
White	0.4%	0.4%	0.5%	0.4%
Multiracial Americans	0.1%	0.0%	0.0%	0.0%
Female	49%	50%	48%	50%
Male	51%	50%	52%	50%

In 2021, Garfield had 104 full-time teachers serving approximately 2,569 students in grades nine through twelve, resulting in a student-teacher ratio of 25:1. The previous year, in 2020, there were 108 full-time teachers serving about 2,531 students, with a student-teacher ratio of 23:1. In 2019, Garfield served around 2,531 students with a student-teacher ratio of 25:1 and employed 101 full-time teachers.

From the 1930s through the 1950s, Garfield High was predominantly White. However, since the 1960s, the majority of the student body has been Hispanic. In the 2005–2006 school year, the school had a total of 4,620 students, with 99.26% of them identified as Hispanic. The total number of students enrolled in the 2009–2010 academic year was 4,603.

=== Year-Round Calendar ===
Garfield was on a year-round, multi-track schedule from July 1991 to June 2010. Initially, there were four tracks (A, B, C, and D), and students were randomly assigned to one of three tracks with alternating two-month vacations. As a result, only three-quarters of the student body were on campus at any given time. In 2010, the school announced that due to the opening of the new Esteban Esteban Torres High School, it would revert to a traditional August–June calendar starting in August 2010.

== Academics ==
Prior to Henry Gradillas' tenure as principal in the 1980s, the average reading level of 10th-grade students (sophomores) was equivalent to that of a student in the second month of the fifth grade, which corresponds to a 5.2 level. Before Gradillas's term, the total number of AP tests taken at Garfield each year was 56.

During Gradillas's term, the average reading level of 12th-grade students (seniors) reached the tenth-grade level, and the annual number of AP tests increased to 357. This increase in the reading level was attributed to the introduction of required reading and remedial English courses for students who were at least three grade levels behind, as well as the implementation of a reading laboratory.

=== US News Rankings ===
US News Rankings
Category	2020	2021	2022	2024	2025
National Rankings	2,280	2,080	2,335	2,617	2,335
California High Schools	319	300	339	359	320
Magnet High Schools	270	257	N/A	N/A	N/A
Los Angeles metropolitan area High Schools	146	131	148	155	157
Los Angeles Unified School District High Schools	55	23	27	29	27

US News Scorecard
Category	2024	2025
Took at least one AP exam	36%	47%
Passed at least one AP exam	24%	31%
Mathematics proficiency	28%	27%
Reading proficiency	63%	67%
Science proficiency	20%	18%
Graduation rate	96%	96%

=== Small Learning Communities (SLCs) ===
At Garfield, there are Small Learning Communities (SLCs) that divide the student body into smaller academies, each focusing on a particular area of study. These include the Career and Performing Arts Academy, Computer Science Magnet, Global Academy, Humanitas Academy of Leadership and Law, and the University Preparatory Program. These SLCs are housed in separate buildings throughout the campus, with each student being assigned to one.

SLCs were introduced to LAUSD around 2005 as part of an effort to combat the issue of students dropping out of school.

=== Advanced Placement ===
Garfield gained renown primarily due to Jaime Escalante, who, in the 1980s, worked alongside Henry Gradillas, the school's administration, to establish an exceptional Advanced Placement program. In 1982, 18 of Escalante's students successfully passed the advanced placement calculus test. The College Board suspected cheating and required the students to retake the examination. Subsequent testing confirmed that the students had indeed learned the material.

By 1987, 73 students had passed the exam, with another 12 passing the second-year calculus test. The events of 1982 were later immortalized in the popular film "Stand and Deliver," starring Academy Award-nominee Edward James Olmos, released in 1988. By 1990, over 400 students were enrolled in Escalante's math program, spanning from algebra to calculus.

However, in 1991, a dispute with the school administration led to Escalante's departure from the Garfield school system. This resulted in a decline in the number of students passing the calculus exams. By 1996, only seven students passed the basic calculus exam, with four succeeding in the advanced exam. This marked a significant drop from the high of 87 passing students nine years earlier. In 2001, the school showed a slight recovery in its calculus scores, with 17 students passing the basic test and seven passing the second-year test.

In 2004, Newsweek ranked Garfield as the 581st top high school in the nation. This ranking was based on the number of Advanced Placement or International Baccalaureate tests taken by all students at the school in 2004, divided by the number of graduating seniors."

=== Student performance ===
In 2005, Garfield achieved the highest number of combined Latino/Chicano and African-American student admissions to the University of California, Berkeley, (UC Berkeley).

== Sports ==
=== American Football ===
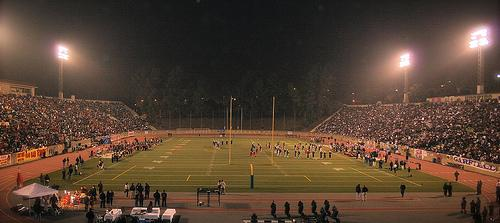
East LA classic

Garfield High School participates in the ""East L.A. Classic"," the homecoming American football game against Theodore Roosevelt High School, which traditionally attracts over 20,000 fans. The East LA Classic has been hosted at the East Los Angeles College's Weingart Stadium, although it has also been held at the Los Angeles Memorial Coliseum.

=== Other sports ===
In addition to the football team, other sports also play significant roles in the annual classic, including the Drill Team, Cheer, and Band. These teams are well-known and have achieved success in various competitions throughout the year. The school also boasts strong programs in Soccer, Baseball, Softball, Swim, Cross-Country, and Basketball.

== Notable alumni ==
Listed in alphabetical order by last name:

- Richard Alatorre (born 1943), member of the California State Assembly and the Los Angeles City Council.
- Carlos Almaraz (1941–1989), Chicano painter, Garfield High School class of 1959.
- John Arguelles (born 1927), former Associate Justice of the California Supreme Court.
- Mike Beltran (born 1973), Mixed Martial Artist and UFC referee.
- J. Jon Bruno (1946–2021), Episcopal Bishop of Los Angeles.
- Oscar De La Hoya (born 1973), former world champion and gold medal-winning boxer and founder of Golden Boy Promotions.
- Ken Davitian (born 1953), film and television actor, co-star of 2006’s Borat.
- Alexander Gonzalez (born 1946), President at California State University, Sacramento.
- Antonia Hernandez (born 1948), philanthropist, attorney, and activist.
- Ricardo Lara (born 1974), California Insurance Commissioner and first LGBT statewide elected leader in California history.
- Los Lobos band, multiple Grammy Award-winning Chicano rock band, the alumni members include:
  - David Hidalgo (born 1954),
  - Conrad Lozano (born 1951),
  - Louie Pérez (born 1953),
  - Cesar Rosas (born 1954).
- Ned Arnel "Carlos" Mencía (born 1967), comedian, writer, and actor.
- Carlos Montes (born 1947), Chicano and immigrant activist, and co-founder of the Brown Berets.
- Richard Polanco (born 1951), former California State Senate Majority leader and member of the California State Assembly.
- George Ramos (1947–2011) Pulitzer Prize–winning journalist for the Los Angeles Times.
- Esteban Edward Torres (born 1930), former Congress member from California and former United States Ambassador to the UNESCO.
- Maria Helena Viramontes (born 1954), writer and professor of English at Cornell University.

== See also ==
- High School - World War II war jobs for students - YouTube pictures of Garfield High School students constructing the Lockheed P-38 Lightning.
- Army–Navy Screen Magazine - Series which was shown to the American soldiers around the world during World War II.
- Walkout (film) - A 2006 HBO film based on a true story of the 1968 East L.A. walkouts.
- Stand and Deliver - The film was added to the National Film Registry of the Library of Congress in 2011.
- The Classic - Film about the Garfields homecoming football game won the 2017 storytelling award from the LA Film Festival.
