= Garfield Bulldogs =

Garfield Bulldogs may refer to the mascot or sports team of the following schools in the United States:

- Garfield High School (California), in East Los Angeles
- Garfield High School (Seattle), Washington
