= Brown Berets (Watsonville) =

The Brown Berets are a Chicano/Mexican-American–based community organization in Watsonville, California, modeled after the Brown Berets of the Civil Rights Movement. Watsonville is a town with a population of 53,856 of which 82% are Latino. An excerpt from their website states, "we serve as a community defense force acting for the liberation and amelioration of our barrios". Their beliefs are anti-military, anti-police, and anti-border patrol. Their members are encouraged to study the Black Panthers and American Militant Resistance. Brown Beret member and former Watsonville Mayor Oscar Rios was quoted in an interview as saying "It (California) belonged to us, Mexico, 1848. It was taken away okay, so it's no surprise we're taking it back slowly but surely."

== Background ==
On April 6, 1994, two Chicano students, Luis Alejo and Felipe Hernandez, inspired by the legacy of the Mexican nationalist-tinged community activism of the original Brown Berets, decided to resurrect the movement. They felt that similar conditions existed there in 1994 that had existed in 1967, and wanted to respond to the gang-related murders of 9-year-old Jessica Cortez and her 16-year-old brother, George. Two of the founding members of the group were current Watsonville City council member Felipe Hernandez and current California State Assembly Member Luis Angel Alejo; both continue to support the group.

Since then, the group has established firm relations with other grassroots community organizations such as Students Against War (UCSC), Barrios Unidos, and the Resource Center for Non-Violence of Santa Cruz, and many other Brown Beret chapters across the U.S. In 2004, the Watsonville Brown Berets opened "Liberation School", which provides tutoring and career guidance as well as an extensive revolutionary library.

On May 27, 2005, the Watsonville Brown Berets organized their fourth annual Youth and Power event, which took place at the Vets Hall in Watsonville. Over 400 young people were in attendance. The event featured counter-military recruitment activist Fernando Suarez del Solar. Over 20 organizations hosted information tables providing literature about college opportunities as well as political, community and environmental activism. “It is events like this that empower our young people and remind them that their voice is a powerful weapon,” said organizer and youth advocate Jennifer Laskin.

In 2008, the Watsonville Brown Berets Launched a bike shack in Watsonville for the youth of their community. This bike shop gives their community an outlet for cooperation with other community members. Rather than working against opposing forces of the Latino community, the Watsonville Brown Berets utilize this bike shop to foster an abundance of physical activities within their community.
