= Villa Alegre (TV series) =

American bilingual children's television program

Villa Alegre (Spanish pronunciation: [ˈbiʎa aˈleɣɾe], Happy Village) is a children's television show and the first national bilingual (Spanish/English) program in the United States. It was produced by Bilingual Children's Television as its inaugural project on the company's founding in 1970. Villa Alegre debuted on Public Broadcasting Service (PBS) public television in 1973 and ran there until funding disputes ended the project in 1981. The show was also seen in syndication on commercial stations at least weekly in some markets.

Villa Alegre was the creation of Dr. Rene Cardenas, who served as president of Bilingual Children's Television and Executive Producer. Other producers included Moctesuma Esparza, who worked on only the first season, and David Ochoa.

The show won a Peabody Award among other honors.

== Description ==
Villa Alegre centered on life in a whimsical bilingual (Spanish and English) village. The program had an upbeat, catchy salsa-flavored theme song, which ended with adults and kids shouting "¡Villa Alegre!" The series was designed to teach each featured language to children who were native speakers of the other. It featured various educational subjects (such as mathematics and science) and life lessons, in addition to Hispanic culture. The executive producer was Claudio Guzman and the head writer was Barbara Chain. Her son Michael Chain was a staff writer who also composed much of the specialty music for the episodes.

== Performers ==
Kenia Hernandez Cueto played the child actress/singer Maria. Actress Carmen Zapata, of Mexican-Argentinian-American heritage, starred in the program for nine seasons in the role of Doña Luz, the mayor of Villa Alegre, Mexican-American singer-actress Marisela appeared on the show in her youth. Actress Linda Dangcil played Elena on the show. The show was directed by Argentine actor and director Alejandro Rey (who co-starred with Dangcil on The Flying Nun). Nono Arsu played Felipe in the first and second seasons. Steve Franken and Hal Smith were regulars also. Darryl Henriques played Mimo in the first and second seasons.
