= East LA Classic =

American high school football game

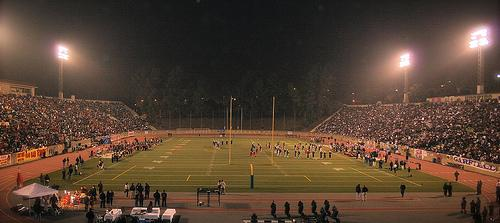
2007 Halftime show

The East LA Classic, or East Los Angeles Classic ('The Classic') is the homecoming football game for both James A. Garfield High School and Theodore Roosevelt High School. It is known as the East L.A. classic, because the two schools were among the first schools to be established in the East Los Angeles area. The Classic is one of the most highly acclaimed and attended high-school football games west of the Mississippi River and has taken place since 1925, the year of Garfield's establishment, with the exception of a span from 1939 to 1948 due to the Great Depression and World War II, and 2020 due to the COVID-19 pandemic.

The game's fame and participation developed over the course of the years to where it was difficult to hold the game at each school's home field. The Classic brings out alumni from all parts of the world, usually fielding crowds in excess of 25,000 per game and has been held at Weingart Stadium on the campus of East Los Angeles College, in Monterey Park, California, for much of its existence. The event was held at the Los Angeles Memorial Coliseum for a few years before returning to its original location at Weingart Stadium.

On Feb. 12, 2011, the rivalry held its first alumni game with Garfield defeating Roosevelt, 19-12. In 2016 even U.S. Senate candidate Congresswoman Loretta Sanchez was in attendance. Garfield took the win, 49-3, for their then sixth consecutive victory over Roosevelt.

First-time director Billy McMillin's film documentary The Classic about the football game won the 2017 storytelling award from the LA Film Festival.

In 2019 Garfield continued its recent dominance of the series at the 85th game, with a 10th straight victory in the rivalry defeating Roosevelt 25-0 shutout over the Rough Riders. Roosevelt had entered the game undefeated in league play. Garfield leads the series, 43-41 with six ties. Prior to the game Roosevelt head coach, Aldo Parral, had been candid, saying he was "happy that Garfield lost in the CIF State Division 4-A Bowl Game last season," while insinuating that the Bulldogs’ recent success in the rivalry boils down to recruiting. The Los Angeles Rams and Nike have provided additional promotion and support. For the second straight year, the two organizations have partnered to donate jerseys, shoes, gloves and other football gear to both schools. Nike has also held several events for the schools. Nike has even gone a step further in support of the Classic by providing gear to the Cheerleading and drill teams of both schools, something that has not been seen in the history of this rivalry.

In 2019 Classic also coincided with the theatrical release of a 2014 documentary depicting the hardships of being a student-athlete in the Boyle Heights/East LA area. “The All-Americans”.

The classic was canceled in 2020 because of the COVID-19 pandemic.

In 2021, the Roosevelt Rough Riders were victorious in defeating the Garfield Bulldogs, 22-19 in one the most exciting games in recent history. The Riders pulled off the win with a missed field goal attempt by Garfield to tie the game in the final seconds of regulation. The victory ended a 10-game drought for the Riders. Roosevelt fans jumped from the stands onto the field and hundreds swarmed the field to be part of this historic victory. The 86th edition of the East Los Angeles Classic was truly a "Classic."

The 2022 classic game returned back to the Los Angeles Memorial Coliseum on October 21, 2022, it featured former Super Bowl halftime performers the Black Eyed Peas with drones as part of the show. Helen Sanchez, the Classic’s media coordinator, said will.i.am and the Angel Foundation had a pregame presentation before the varsity game. Roosevelt alum Lynn Cain, a former running back for the Atlanta Falcons and will.i.am.'s uncle, oversaw the pregame coin toss. Garfield came out victorious with a 16-8 lead over Roosevelt. After the game, it was reported that 2 cameras were stolen.

== See also ==
- List of high school football rivalries (less than 100 years old)
