= Brown Berets =

American Chicano rights organization

- Founder: David Sanchez; Carlos Montes
- Founded: 1967
- Dissolved: 1972 (officially)
- Preceded by: Young Citizens for Community Action (1966–1967); Young Chicanos for Community Action (1967)
- Newspaper: La Causa (1967–1977)
- Ideology: Chicanismo; Anti-capitalism; Anti-fascism; Anti-racism; Anti-imperialism
- Political position: Left-wing to far-left
- National affiliation: Rainbow Coalition
- Colors: Brown and yellow
- Slogan: "Serve — Observe — Protect"

The Brown Berets (Spanish: Los Boinas Cafés [los ˈβojnas kaˈfes]) is a Chicano paramilitary organization that emerged during the Chicano Movement in the United States during the late 1960s. David Sanchez and Carlos Montes co-founded the group modeled after the Black Panther Party. The Brown Berets was part of the Third World Liberation Front. It worked for educational reform, farmworkers' rights, and against police brutality and the Vietnam War. It also sought to separate the American Southwest from the control of the United States government.

The Brown Berets' high visibility and paramilitary stance made it a key target for infiltration and harassment by local police, the Federal Bureau of Investigation (FBI), and other law enforcement agencies. The majority of the Brown Berets' chapters disbanded in 1972. Several groups reformed and became active after the passage of California Proposition 187 in 1994.

== History ==
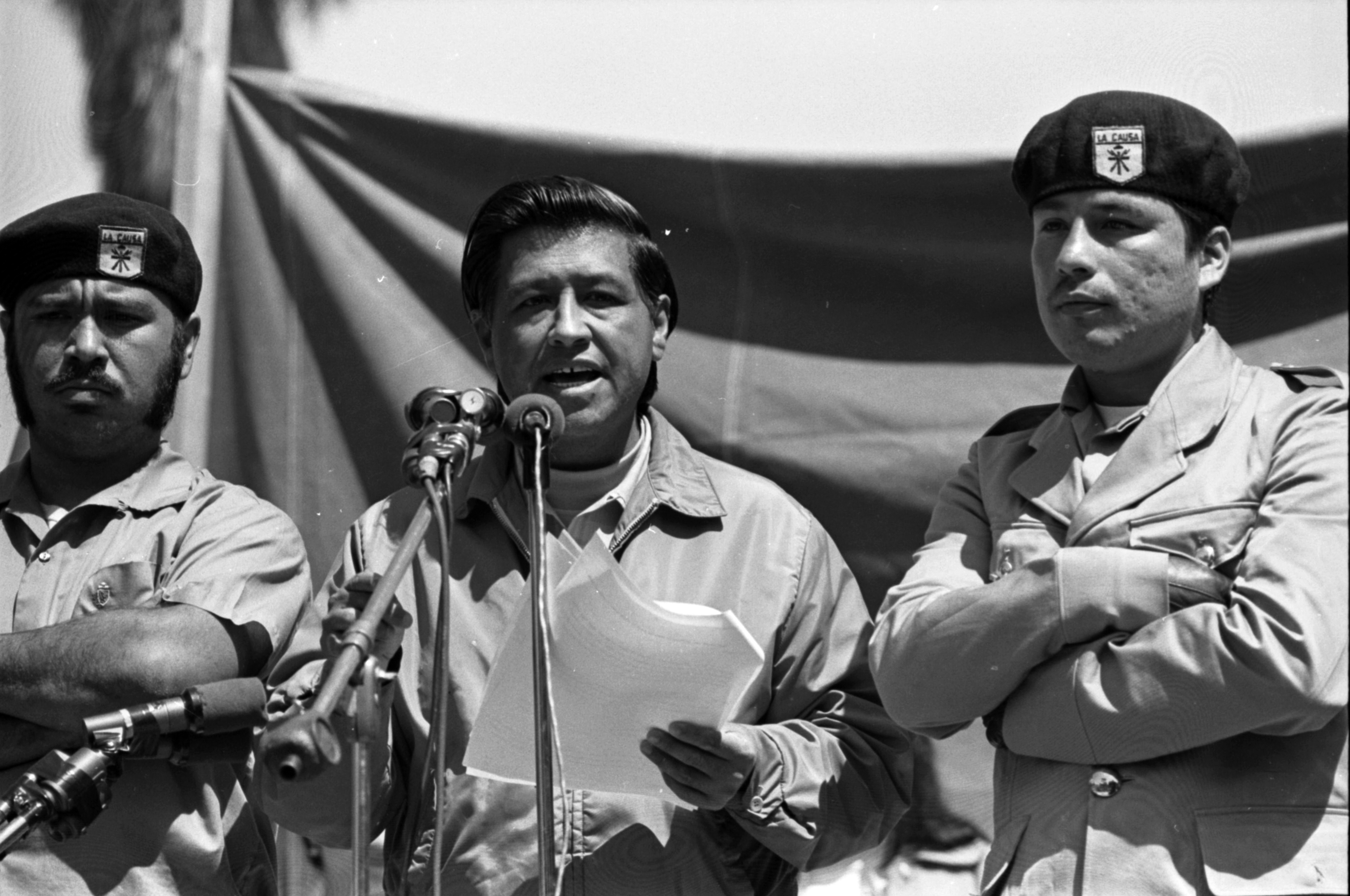
Civil rights activist Cesar Chavez, flanked by Brown Berets, at a 1971 rally during the Chicano movement

In 1966, a group of high school students discussed issues affecting Mexican Americans as part of the Annual Chicano Student Conference in Los Angeles County. Vickie Castro, Moctesuma Esparza, Jorge Licón, Rachel Ochoa, John Ortiz, and David Sanchez attended the conference. The students continued meeting after the conference. Later that year, they formed the Young Citizens for Community Action and worked to support Dr. Julian Nava's campaign as a Los Angeles Unified School District board member candidate in 1967. Nava became the first Mexican-American to serve on the school board.

Sanchez and Esparza learned about social action at a class taught by Rev. John B. Luce at the Church of the Epiphany in Lincoln Heights with the Community Service Organization. In 1967, Young Citizens for Community Action changed its name to Young Chicanos For Community Action or YCCA. That same year, Rev. Luce helped Sanchez and the YCCA secure a grant to open La Piranha Coffee House in a former warehouse on Olympic Boulevard.

La Piranha Coffee House became the headquarters of the YCCA. There, Sanchez sponsored activist speakers, including H. Rap Brown, Stokely Carmichael, Corky Gonzales, and Reies Tijerina. Because it became a popular place for young Chicanos to socialize and organize, sheriff deputies began arbitrarily stopping individuals coming and going from the coffee house. In one instance, the deputies raided La Piranha illegally and arrested individuals for violating curfews.

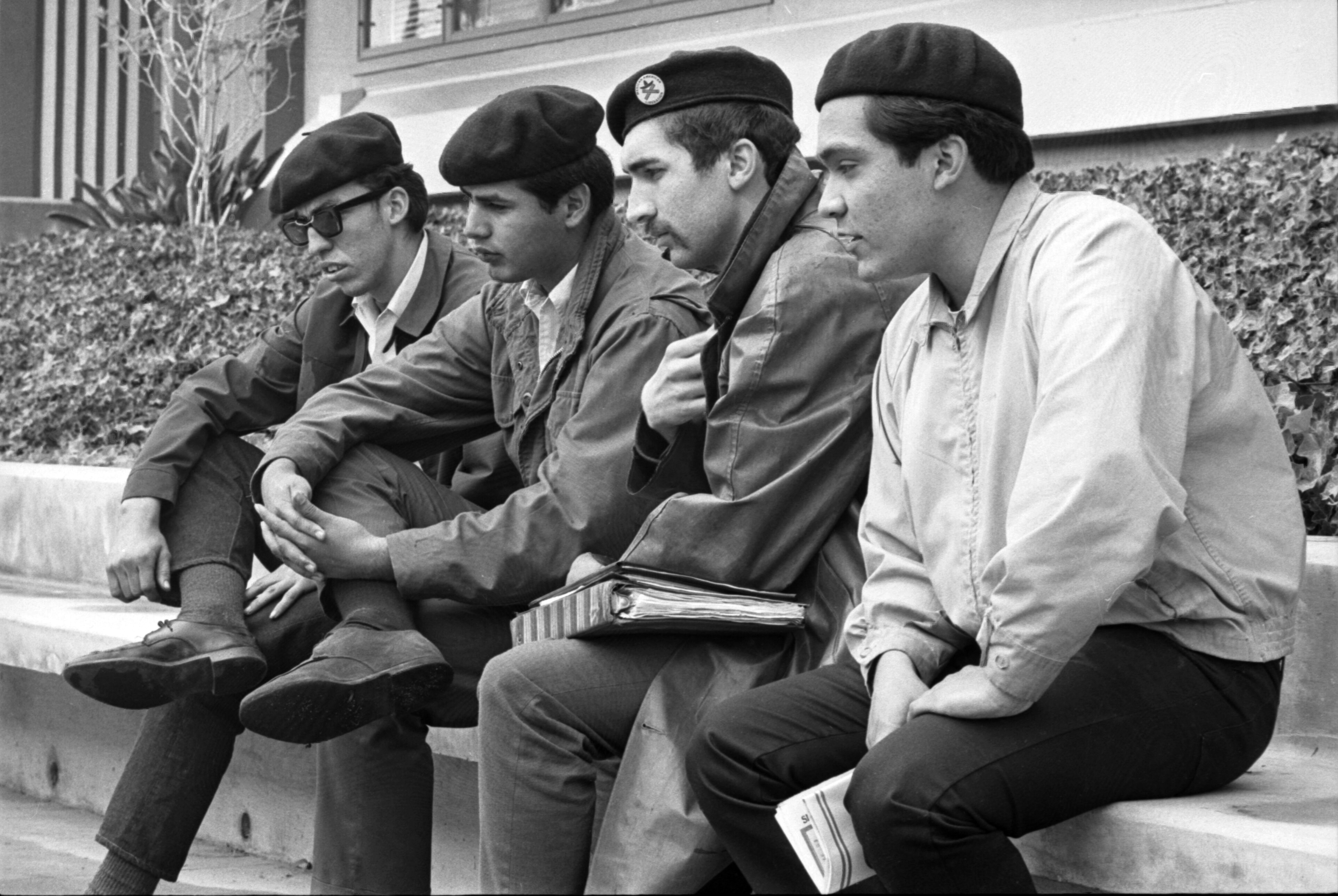
Four Brown Berets leaders: Fred Lopez, David Sanchez, Carlos Montes, and Ralph Ramirez in Los Angeles, California, 1968

In September 1967, Sal Castro, a Korean War veteran and teacher at Lincoln High School, began meeting with the YCCA at La Piranha Coffee House. YCCA's initial focus was on public school issues impacting for Chicanos, from dated textbook to a lack of Mexican cafeteria options. The group assumed paramilitary dress and brown berets like Che Guevara. As a result, the organization gained the name Brown Berets. The Brown Berets did not have any official requirements to join, but unofficially, members had to be Chicano men or women. Members were mostly in their teens and early twenties.

Chicanismo was the primary ideology of the Brown Berets. One member recalled, "We were a group of young Chicano revolutionaries from the barrios of the Southwest fighting for the self-determination of our people." Their focus was on school inequality and police brutality but expanded to include the Vietnam War and the lack of political representation, health care, and jobs for Chicanos.

The Brown Berets chose the motto, “To Serve, Observe, and Protect.” This motto reflected the Los Angeles Police Department's "To Protect and To Serve" and "indicated that the Berets believed they were, or should have been, the police of the community."

By 1969, the Brown Berets was a national organization with chapters in California, Colorado, Minnesota, New Mexico, New York, Oregon, Texas, and Washington. Brown Beret chapters were in 28 cities, primarily in California but also in Albuquerque, Denver, Detroit, El Paso, Milwaukee, Salt Lake City, San Antonio, St. Louis, Saint Paul, and Seattle.

Law enforcement's perception was that Brown Berets was "a violent and/or subversive organization". Representatives from the Los Angeles Police Department, the Los Angeles County Sheriff's Department, and the United States Bureau of Alcohol, Tobacco, and Firearms infiltrated every aspect of the Brown Berets. In addition, the FBI closely monitored the Brown Berets' activities. A modern historian notes, "These individuals and departments did not just act as intelligence agents, but as agent provocateurs as well. They created the situations that were used to discredit the Brown Berets and drive rifts between members."

By 1972, internal conflicts and ongoing issues with law enforcement had weakened the Brown Berets. On November 1, 1972, the Brown Berets' prime minister David Sanchez announced the organization's disbandment "chiefly to avoid strife in the Chicano Movement and factional violence." At the time, there were 36 chapters, most established near college and university campuses.

== Activities ==
=== California ===
The California Brown Berets were involved in marches, anti-war protests, and student walkouts. The group published the newspaper La Causa which included articles on national Brown Beret causes such as the United Farm Workers and the New Mexico Land Grant movement under Reies Tijerina.

The Brown Berets protested killings and abuses perpetrated by the East Los Angeles Sheriff's station in its community. On November 24, 1967, the group held its first protest against police brutality in response to the Santoya family's treatment by the police after a complaint for disturbing the peace. Through January 1968, the Brown Berets coordinated two other protests at the courthouse and sheriff's station.

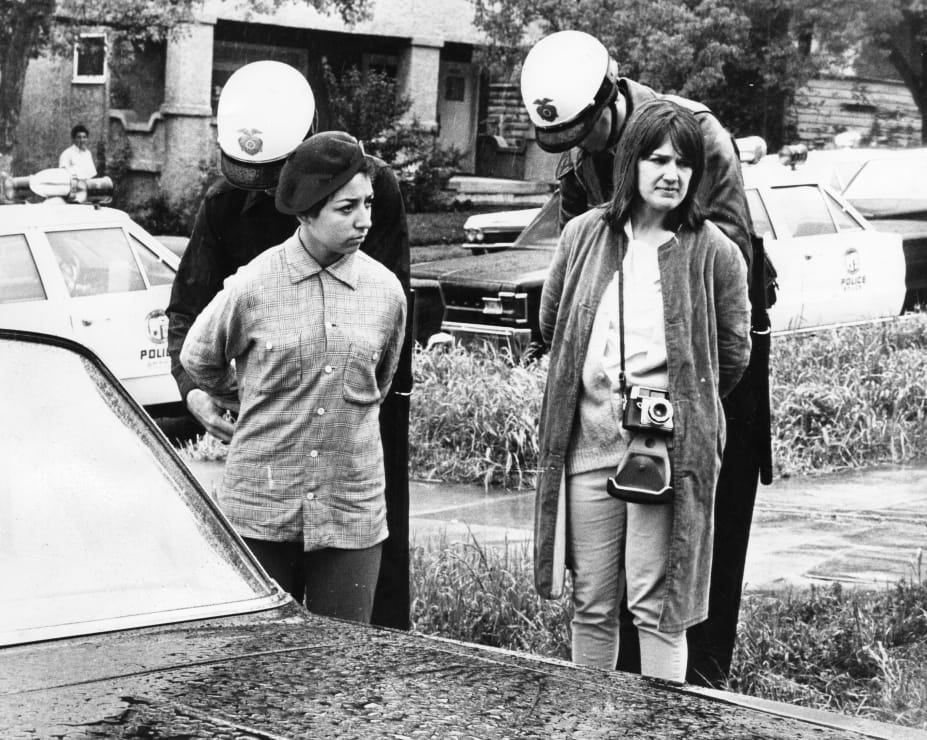
Founding co-editor of La Raza Ruth Robinson (right) with Margarita Sanchez (left) at the Belmont High School walkout, 1968

In 1968, the Brown Berets planned and supported the East Los Angeles blowouts or school walkouts for some 10,000 youth who protested unequal education over two weeks. Two months after the blowout on May 31, 1968, five Brown Berets were arrested or indicted, becoming part of the East L.A. 13. Hundreds of protestors gathered in front of the Los Angeles Police Department the next day. More protesters assembled before the county jail the following day. When the community struggled to raise bail money for the East L.A. 13, Eugene McCarthy and Robert F. Kennedy’s political campaigns offered aid. This essentially shamed the court into setting a more affordable bail. However, this type of legal harassment intimidated current and potential Brown Berets members and pulled funds away from other projects.

The Los Angeles Brown Berets opened the East Los Angeles Free Clinic or Barrio Free Clinic in May 1969. The clinic provided full health services and a pharmacy staffed by volunteer nurses and doctors who were mostly White. It was open in the evenings, providing access for working people. The Barrio Free Clinic helped elevate the community's impression of the Brown Berets, helping them see beyond the paramilitary uniforms. Brown Beret Gloria Arellanes became the clinic's director in July 1969. She recalled, "The clinic became my passion because it really addressed a real need in the community."

Also in 1969, the Brown Berets organized the Chicano Moratorium Committee which planned annual protest marches against the Vietnam War. A few months later in 1970, nearly 20,000 Chicanos marched in the National Chicano Moratorium March in Los Angeles which protested the high number of Chicanos in the military draft and Vietnam casualty lists. This peaceful march was one of the largest Vietnam War protests in the United States. The march became chaotic when police responded to a minor incident by attacking peaceful participants. The officers killed three Chicano activists, including two Brown Berets and journalist Rubén Salazar.

On April 22, 1970, the San Diego Brown Berets (also known as the National Brown Berets de Aztlan) and other community activist organizations took over a piece of land in Logan Heights scheduled to become a highway patrol sub-station. This plot of land is now Chicano Park, and Chicano graffiti art on the pillars of the San Diego–Coronado Bridge memorializes the protest.

The Brown Berets organized the March Through Aztlán in 1971, protesting police brutality, racial discrimination, and the Vietnam War by marching one thousand miles from Calexico to the state capital in Sacramento. In August 1972, the Brown Berets staged Occupation of Catalina Island, claiming it for Chicanos and the Brown Berets under the leadership of David Sanchez. The Brown Berets said the Treaty of Guadalupe Hidalgo, which gave California to the United States in 1848, did not include the offshore islands. Occupation of Catalina Island attracted significant national media attention to the Brown Berets.

=== Chicago ===
In 1972, the Chicago Brown Berets set up the Benito Juarez People's Health Center at 1831 S. Racine in the Casa Aztlán Center, just outside downtown Chicago. The health center was named after Juarez, the "Abraham Lincoln of Mexico." The clinic's director, Dorthy Cutler, worked with Cook County Hospital and other major hospitals in the Chicago area to provide free medical care in the Chicago area.

The Chicago Brown Berets were activists for public education. The group occupied Frobel Middle School for a day before the Chicago Police removed the protestors from the school. That evening, a riot broke out; several rioters and one policeman were injured as the police tried to disperse the crowd. The rioters also destroyed six police cars.

=== Texas ===
Founded in 1972, the Brown Berets Chapter of Austin focused on issues similar to the original chapter of Los Angeles that plagued the Chicano community. A quote from Gilberto Rivera, a prominent East Austin activist states, "the formation was due to a ‘call’ from the community & out of their own direct experiences of police violence which followed a persistent pattern in Austin & nearby communities". In addition, the Brown Berets "formulated the ‘Brown Beret Manifesto’ which sought short & long-term goals on community matters like: police oppression, economics, immigration, education, housing, prison reform, medicine, communication (news/media channels)".[1]

The Austin Brown Beret chapter was considered a grassroots organization with the intentions of protecting youth and the rights of citizens. During its active years it worked closely with other grassroots organization and other local chapters when necessary. The chapter ultimately dissolved in 1983. Despite this, the legacy it left continued through the efforts of several other organizations such as PODER, CAMILA – Chicanos Against Military Intervention in Latin America, League of United Chicano Artists (LUChA), Youth Advocacy (formally known as CARNALES Inc.), and East Austin Economic Development Corporation.

=== Washington ===
The Washington Brown Berets formed in Granger, Washington, around 1968. The group expanded to Seattle in 1969 as students from the Yakima Valley enrolled in the University of Washington. Between 1968 and 1984, the Brown Berets organized youth and college students in Washington. Together these chapters formed a La Raza Unida Party in their state.

The Seattle Brown Berets occupied Beacon Hill School in Seattle. This protest led to the founding of El Centro de la Raza, now one of Seattle's most prominent civil rights organizations. In 1970, the Seattle chapter supported the United Farm Workers movement with a Harvest for Peace, gathering food, clothing, and money for Christmas baskets for Yakima Valley's Chicano farm workers. The group also organized a grape boycott.

In 1970, the Yakima Brown Berets chapter brought Cesar Chavez to the lower Yakima Valley. It also coordinated a five-mile march to the welfare office in Yakima to protest the abuse of the Chicanos by officials.

== Women in the movement ==
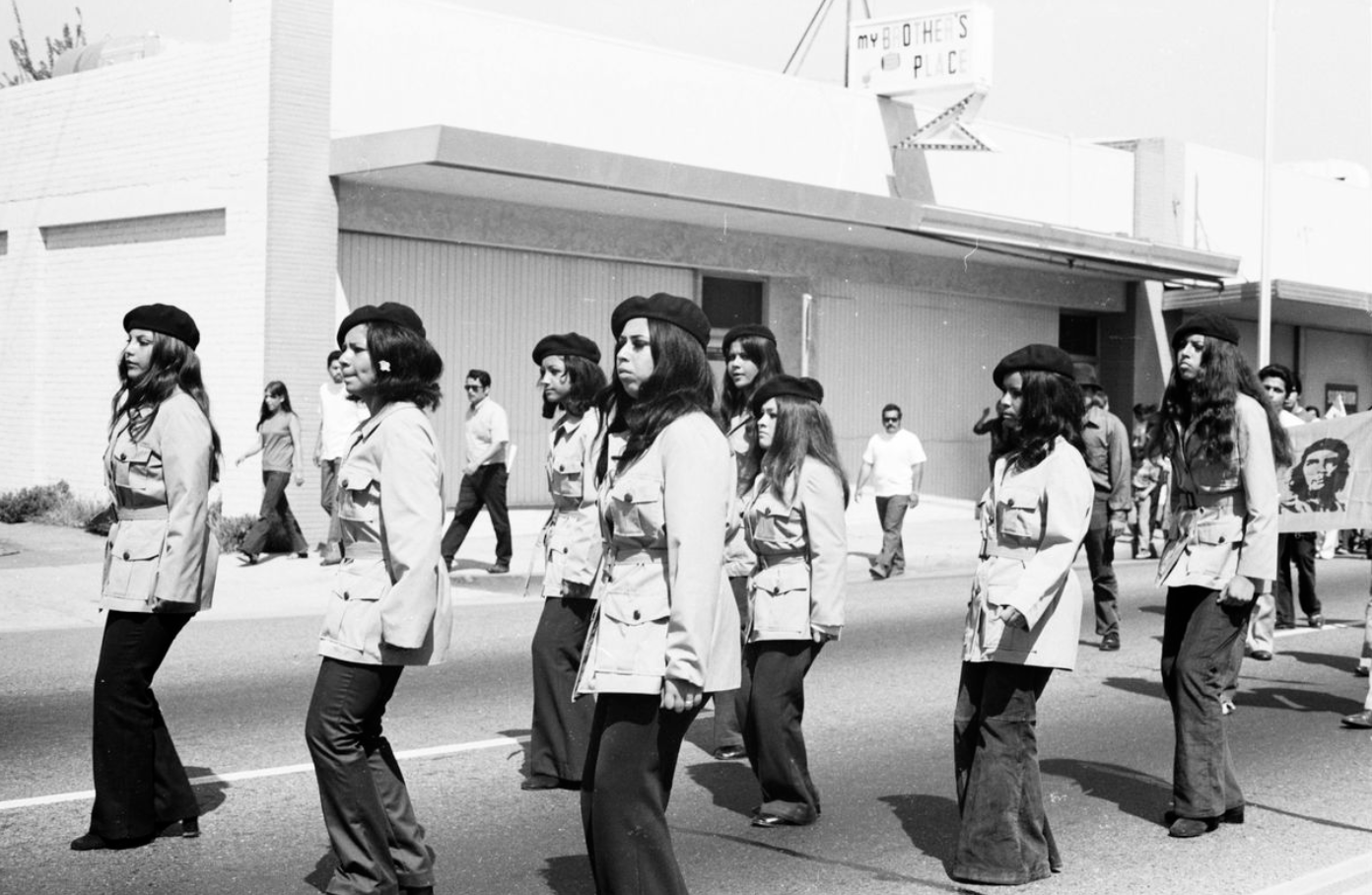
Brown Beret women march in step, 1970.

Although the Brown Berets was a male-dominated organization, women members established and operated essential community institutions such as the Barrio Free Clinic, which TELACU later institutionalized.

One of the internal problems for the Brown Berets was sexism towards the women of the movement, arising from a culture of machismo. Machismo posits a patriarch heading a family, or multiple families for reproductive aims, and does not allow for female-headed families or other variations in family structure except under certain circumstances. It also maintains that a woman's principal purpose is a domestic life taking care of children and cleaning. Black male studies scholars have pushed to reevaluate similar depictions of heteropatriarchy in their own communities. Chicano scholars likewise responded with studies demonstrating that such conceptions underpin Chicano inclusive masculinity as well as intersections between elements of post-feminist machismo and marianismo.

The movement's men tended to view female Brown Berets as subservient and unequal, relegating the women to clerical duties, cooking, and cleaning. In 1968, Gloria Arellanes became the first and only female prime minister of the Brown Berets but recalled being "shut out of decision-making processes." However, Arellanes used her power within her chapter to create support and solidarity between the women of the movement. Eventually, these women left the East Los Angeles Brown Berets; Arellanes believes this contributed to the organization's downfall.

Arellanes, along with the other women in the Brown Berets wrote a letter of resignation after the machismo the Los Angeles chapter Brown Beret men had shown to them. She mentioned how "Brown Beret men have oppressed us more than the pig system," the same pig system they were against. Because of this, the resignation was something these women found fit as they felt as though they could do much better in terms of organization. This led to the creation of Las Adelitas de Aztlán.

Despite the presence of sexism, the Chicana movement in the Brown Berets did empower women initially. It allowed them to express their anger towards the United States government in a way that could make a positive change. For example, many Mexican female activists took pride in their political agendas. They felt it linked each organization because of their shared common history of the working class and activism.

The Brown Berets brought out women such as the poet and activist Viola Correa. Her bilingual poem titled "La Nueva Chicana" impacted the cultural revolution and empowered the movement's women:

"Hey!
See that lady protesting against injustice, es mi mama
That girl in the brown beret,
The one teaching the children
She's my Hermana
Over there fasting with the migrants
Es mi tía"
...
She knows what hardship is
All about.
The establishment calls her
A radical militant.
The newspapers read she is
A dangerous subversive
They label her name to condemn her.
By the F.B.I. she's called
A big problem.
In Aztlan we call her
La Nueva Chicana.

== Collaborations and influences ==
The Brown Berets took inspiration from the greater Black Power Movement in terms of self-defense and racial-pride.

They were specifically modeled after the Black Panther Party and communicated with the Black Panthers in Los Angeles. That connection directed the Brown Berets toward a position that aligned with the Third World Liberation Front.

In El Monte, California, the Student Nonviolent Coordinating Committee (SNCC) and Brown Berets often supported each other in marches against the Vietnam War and jail conditions at the Bexar County Jail. In addition, SNCC ran African American candidates for State offices under the La Raza Unida Party and often supported Mexican American activists.

In 1968, the Los Angeles Brown Berets participated in the Poor People's Campaign that was organized by Martin Luther King Jr. and the Southern Christian Leadership Conference. The Poor People's Campaign's fight to change the conditions for America's poor resonated with the Brown Berets and also connected them with diverse people on a national level. In 1969, the Brown Berets participated in Fred Hampton's first Black power iteration of a Rainbow Coalition, composed of distinct and exclusive movements within a coalition. Other participants included the Young Patriots with William "Preacherman" Fesperman, the Young Lords under the leadership of Jose Cha Cha Jimenez, and the Lincoln Park Poor People's Coalition.

Before, during, and after the Brown Beret Movement, Black Beret chapters were founded across the United States, especially in the southwest and California. Most chapters shared common purposes and goals with the Brown Berets, to the extent that historians and even a number of past members classified Black Berets as Brown Beret chapters with regional aims. Past Black Beret chapters denounced illegal narcotics and championed La Raza for ChicanX peoples, claiming twentieth- and twenty-first century Hispanic intersections with Classic and post-Classic Mesoamerica as "forgotten" ethno-racial "heritage." Cultural elements of the Mexicayotl movement, assimilation-as-Mexica-indigeneity, were adopted into la raza and Chicano nationalism. Present Black Berets support ChicanX peoples with U.S. tribal membership and Mesoamerican "heritage," recognizing Chicanismo as inclusive of multiple ChicanX communities and organizations, from the California Truth & Healing Council to the Intertribal Friendship House. Central Americans, despite marching in the Chicano Movement, have only recently been recognized by ChicanX-Central American academe. Black Beret chapters have further begun to reallocate funds reserved for armed ChicanX militancy to armed "security." This designation includes, but is not limited to, law enforcement and, presumably, security detail for a variety of employers.

== Uniform and insignia ==
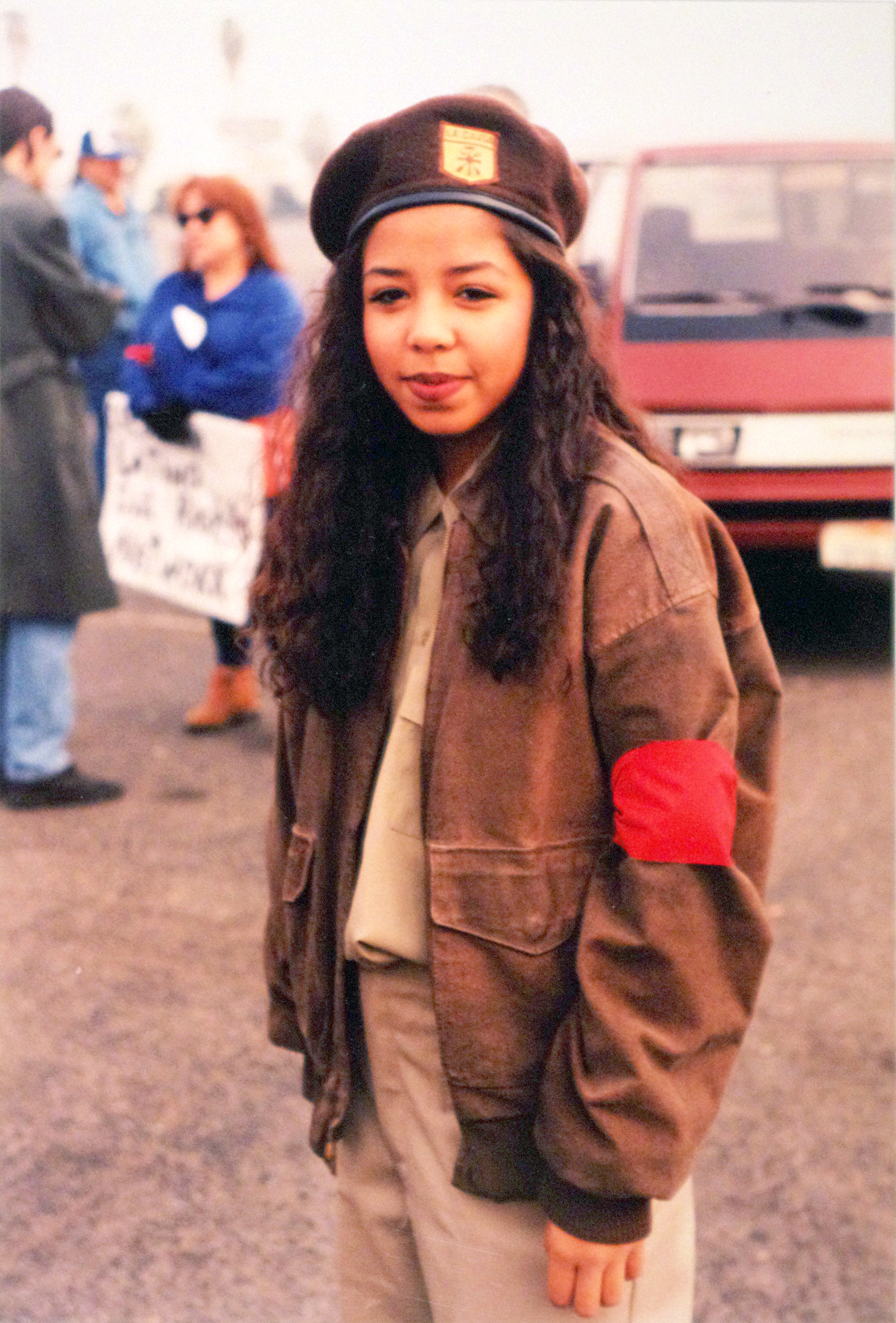
Brown Beret in Fresno, California for No on Prop 187 (1994)

Members of the Brown Berets wore brown military fatigues and a brown beret. The beret is "a symbol of the pride in [their] culture, race, and history. It also symbolizes [their] anger and militancy and fight against the long history of injustice against the Chicana people in the U.S., especially the Southwest."

Members of the Brown Berets who complete training and probation could wear the official patch on their beret. The patch features a cross topped by a brown beret with two crossed rifles on a field of gold, bordered by the color brown and topped by the words "La Causa". The color gold represents the history going back to pre-Columbian times, while the color brown represents the people. The cross symbolizes the member's beliefs, sacrifices, and commitment to the cause. The beret represents the group's organization and structure. The rifles represent the military structure of the Brown Berets. “La Causa” means "the cause" for which the Brown Berets fight.

A variation of the patch was developed in the late 1970s that reads Aztlan instead of La Causa. Aztlan is the Chicanos' historical nation; those who wear this patch are committed to fighting for that nation. Another variation was developed in the late 1990s which says Olin or "movement." Autonomous or independent Brown Beret groups are the primary users of the Olin patch.

Members of the Hillsboro Unit in Oregon developed an insignia that says, "Brown Berets", the only such insignia within the national organization. The Hillsboro unit is also known for wearing a Mexica War patch at armed protests or open carry Second Amendment demonstrations.

== Reorganization ==
In response to escalating Chicano homicides, David Sanchez and Jeronimo Blanco reactivated the California Brown Berets in 1992 with a focus on barrio peace. A February 26, 1995 conference in Fresno, California included Brown Beret units from Fresno, Hayward, Los Angeles, Long Beach, Madera, San Diego, Sanger, Santa Rosa, Stockton, and Watsonville. In 2016, Sanchez started the Brown Berets National Party.

During a session discussing the Development, Relief and Education for Alien Minors Act (DREAM) at California State University, Fresno on January 6, 2011, a Brown Beret member spoke out of turn and was removed from the building by the police officers. Others in the audience argued that the United States unlawfully acquired California lands that had previously belonged to Mexico.

Most of the original Oregon Brown Berets either died of old age or moved to other parts of the United States. However, in 2017, during El Grito at Shute Park in Hillsboro, Oregon, an elder Tejano-born Brown Beret was discovered by a younger unit from Portland wanting to reestablish El Movimiento in Oregon. As a result, the Hillsboro Unit has grown and was the first to reestablish militant Chicanismo in Oregon. Lobo Cuetlāchtli became captain of the group. Under his leadership, the Hillsboro Brown Berets co-formed a New Portland Rainbow Coalition, organized Know Your Rights campaigns, offered firearm and self-defense classes for brown women, and held annual day labor jacket drives. In addition, this chapter served as medics for the 50th Annual National Chicano Moratorium in August 2020, where Cuetlāchtli gave a brief speech.

On August 25, 2018, the Brown Berets participated in the march for the 48th Chicano Moratorium in East Los Angeles. Many current Brown Berets organizations participated, including the National Brown Berets, Brown Berets de Aztlan, Los Brown Berets, Brown Berets of Cemanahuac, Brown Berets National Organization, and autonomous Brown Berets. In June 2020, the Salt Lake City-based Rose Park Brown Berets held extensive demonstrations calling for the resignation of the city's district attorney, Sim Gill, following the killing of Bernardo Palacios-Carbajal by the Salt Lake police department a few months prior.

The Los Brown Berets held the first People's Coalition Rally in Chicago on September 24, 2022. The rally included other revolutionary organizations such as the Black Panthers, the Young Lords, the White Panthers, the American Indian Movement, the Poor People's Army, FTP-Chicago (For The People), the Chicago Alliance Against Racist and Political Repression, and other Brown Beret groups. More than 100 attendees participated to show unity from all races and solidarity about issues such as caged children.

== Chapters ==
Chapter Name	City	State	Founded/Range	Reference
Aztlanecas Brown Berets		Arizona and California	2020	
Arizona Brown Berets		Arizona	c. 1994	
	Berkeley	California	1969–1972	
	Encino	California	1969–1972	
	Fresno	California	1969–1972, c. 1994	
	Hayward	California	c. 1994	
	Imperial Beach	California	1969–1972	
	Indio	California	1972	
	Long Beach	California	c. 1994	
	Los Angeles	California	1967–1972, 1992	
	Madera	California	c. 1994	
	National City	California	1969–1972	
	Oakland	California	1969–1972	
	Oxnard	California	1969–1972	
	Palo Alto	California	1969–1972	
	Porterville	California	1969–1972	
	Reedley	California	1969–1972	
	Richmond	California	1969–1972	
	Riverside	California	1972	
	Sacramento	California	1969–1972	
Brown Berets de Aztlan	San Diego	California	1969–1972, c. 1994	
	San Francisco	California	1969–1972	
	San Ysidro	California	1969–1972	
	Sanger	California	c. 1994	
	Santa Clara	California	1969–1972	
	Santa Rosa	California	c. 1994	
	Stockton	California	1969–1972, c. 1994	
	Ventura	California	1972	
Watsonville Brown Berets	Watsonville	California	1994	
	Watts	California	1969–1972	
Colorado Brown Berets	Denver	Colorado	1969–1972	
	Pueblo	Colorado	1969–1980s and beyond	
Idaho Brown Berets	Boise	Idaho	c. 1994	
	Chicago	Illinois		
	Detroit	Michigan	1969–1972	
	Saint Paul	Minnesota	1969–1972	
Los Brown Berets		New Mexico	c. 1994	
	Albuquerque	New Mexico	1969–1972	
	Santa Fe	New Mexico	1969–1972	
	Eugene	Oregon	1969–1975	
Oregon Brown Berets	Hillsboro	Oregon	2017	
	Austin	Texas	1972–1983	
	Dallas	Texas	1972	
Los Brown Berets	El Paso	Texas		
	McAllen	Texas	1972	
	Houston	Texas	1972	
Carnalismo Brown Berets	San Antonio	Texas	1969–1972	
Rose Park Brown Berets	Salt Lake City	Utah	2010s	
Washington Brown Berets	Granger	Washington	1968–1984	
	Seattle	Washington	1969–1972	
	Yakima	Washington	1969–1970	

== See also ==
- Chicanismo
- Brown Berets (Watsonville)
- East L.A. walkouts
- Los Siete de la Raza
- Chicano Liberation Front
- Black Panther Party
- Black power movement
