= Shirlee Smith =

American parenting author

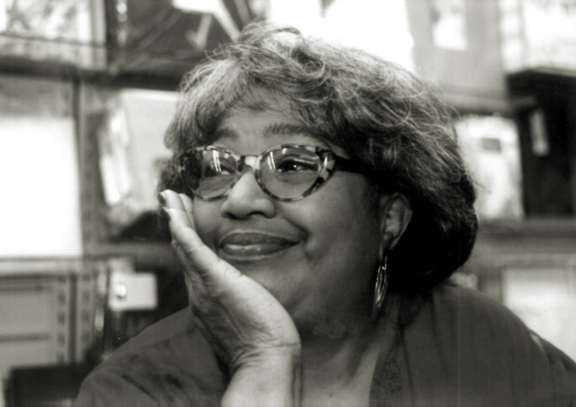

Shirlee Smith is a children's advocate, an opinion columnist and author, and currently the producer and host of her own television show, "Talk About Parenting with Shirlee Smith", which debuted in 1994. Smith first gained the public's attention when her social issues column debuted in the Pasadena Star News in the late 1980s. She is the parent of four adult daughters and a teenage foster daughter, and has three grandsons and one great-granddaughter.

== Early life ==
Born in Los Angeles, CA, Shirlee is the second of Bernice and Eugene Pickett's four children. Bernice was a domestic and sometimes a "live-in"; Eugene was a waiter on the Southern Pacific Railroad and sometimes a waiter in fashionable Los Angeles restaurants. Early years were on the west side of Los Angeles, she attended the 37th Street Elementary School.

The family then moved to Boyle Heights, to the home of Lily Pickett, the fraternal grandmother. Here, Shirlee attended sixth grade at First Street School. Next was Robert Louis Stevenson Middle School, where Shirlee and sister Beverlee were two of only four African American students at the school. Shirlee graduated from Theodore Roosevelt High School in 1954.

She attended Los Angeles City College where she majored in accounting and met her first husband. The marriage fell apart after the birth of their second daughter, she moved back home with her mom, who quickly found Shirlee a small house of her own to rent.

Shirlee applied for welfare, then married her second husband and had four more children. Her second child died in 1959, at the age of two, due to sickle cell disease. Her fourth child, her only son, died in 1983 as a result of injuries sustained in an automobile accident. The couple separated when Smith was 30. Smith has fostered "a dozen" infants.

She enrolled at Pasadena City College, then graduated from UCLA.

== Career path ==
=== Newspaper columns ===
Since 1980, Smith has written opinion columns in the Pasadena Star News and San Gabriel Valley newspapers. Her columns have also appeared in the Los Angeles Times, the Oakland Tribune, the Los Angeles Sentinel, and the Pasadena Weekly.

=== Cable TV show host and producer ===
In 1994, with a small grant from the "City of Pasadena" , she launched the cable television program "Talk About Parenting" which became a non-profit organization in 1997. According to The Root (magazine), Smith "takes a no-nonsense approach to raising happy, balanced children."

Smith founded the charity, Talk About Parenting.

== Book ==
Smith is author of “They’re Your Kids, Not Your Friends", published in English in 2001 (Sorin Press) and in Spanish in 2005, "Son Tus Hijos, No Tus Amigos"(Panorama Press.
