= Walkout (film) =

- Theatrical poster
- Screenplay by: Marcus DeLeon; Ernie Contreras; Timothy J. Sexton
- Story by: Victor Villaseñor
- Directed by: Edward James Olmos
- Starring: Alexa Vega; Efren Ramirez; Michael Peña; Tonantzin Esparza
- Music by: Rosino Serrano
- Country of origin: United States
- Original languages: English; Spanish

Production
- Producers: Moctesuma Esparza; Robert A. Katz
- Cinematography: Donald M. Morgan
- Editor: Michael McCusker
- Running time: 120 minutes

Original release
- Network: HBO
- Release: March 18, 2006

Walkout is a 2006 HBO film based on a true story of the 1968 East L.A. walkouts, also referred to as the Chicano blowouts. It premiered March 18, 2006 on HBO. Starring Alexa Vega, Efren Ramirez and Michael Peña, the film was directed by Edward James Olmos. Moctezuma Esparza, one of the real-life students who was involved in the walkouts, was the film's executive producer.

== Plot ==
Various high schools in East Los Angeles mistreat hispanic students, including handing out punishments for speaking Spanish in school, locking bathrooms during lunch, using janitorial work as punishment, and administrational dissuasion of the less promising students from attending college. Student Paula Crisostomo is tired of being treated unequally. Meeting with student activists, they decide to try to change the way students are treated. Inspired by her Chicano teacher Sal Castro and defying opposition from her father, Paula hands out surveys to students to suggest improvements to the schools. Each East LA high school is represented by two or three students of the group; Paula particularly becomes interested in Robert.

A collection of the surveys is submitted to the school board, which refuses to consider the suggestions. During a meeting with the activists, Paula urges the students to "walk out" of school. The police find out via a student in the group and the principal threatens to expel Paula if she continues to encourage rebellion. Paula's plan is also to the derision of her father, who denounces the group as a bunch of "agitators." The group successfully convinces five East LA schools to walk out; the event is revealed on the news. The school board says they might consider their demands, but the Brown Berets insist on taking more action. Paula's father evicts her from the house for her role in the walkout. The next day, the students decide to walk out in only half of the schools, but the police arrest and beat the protesters. Footage appears on the news and the students are painted as violent agitators with Communist ties, and footage of police brutality is not shown. Paula decides to invite the students' families to the protests, hoping their presence will deter the police.

The next day, the students walk out again, this time with the support of their families. The school board agrees to hear the complaints of the group. Paula invites a reluctant Robert to prom. While she prepares, the police suddenly arrest 12 of the leaders of the student movement, including several of the Brown Berets. When Paula goes to Sal for advice, she discovers that Robert, who is an undercover LAPD officer, has been informing the police of the group's plans and assisted in the arrests. The students are charged with conspiracy to disrupt a school with a maximum penalty of 66 years. Paula is defeated, but her father urges her not to give up. She helps to stage a massive protest outside the jail. Robert is on duty there and tries to stop her, but she continues leading the crowd until all 12 students and Sal are released. An epilogue reveals real accounts from people involved in the walkouts and the subsequent increase of Hispanic enrollment in Los Angeles colleges.

== Cast ==
- Alexa Vega as Paula Crisostomo
- Michael Peña as Sal Castro
- Yancey Arias as Panfilo Crisostomo
- Laura Harring as Francis Crisostomo
- Bodie Olmos as Moctesuma Esparza
- Efren Ramirez as Bobby Verdugo
- Jeremy Ray Valdez as Robert Avila
- David Warshofsky as Lloyd Hurley
- Tonantzin Esparza as Vickie Castro
- Holmes Osborne as Principal Ingles
- Tim DeKay as Mr. Peck
- Jonathan Hernandez as Fernie Flores
- Fidel Gomez as Carlos Montes
- Veronica Diaz-Carranza as Yoli Rios
- Germaine De Leon as Harry Gamboa
- Edward James Olmos as Julian Nava
- Jerry Hernandez as Ray Chapa

== Reception ==
A month after the film first aired, 2,500 Colorado students initiated a walkout of Denver schools to protest H.R. 4437, known as the "Sensenbrenner Bill." This House bill would have made it a felony (rather than a misdemeanor) to be in the US illegally. The bill was the catalyst for the 2006 U.S. immigration reform protests. Other student Walk Out protests in May 2006 were in part inspired by the film.
