= Moctesuma Esparza =

American film producer (born 1949)

- Born: March 12, 1949 (age 76); East Los Angeles, California, United States
- Education: University of California, Los Angeles
- Occupations: Film producer, entertainment executive, entrepreneur, community activist
- Years active: 1973-present

Moctesuma Esparza (born March 12, 1949) is a Mexican-American producer, entertainment executive, entrepreneur and community activist. He is the chief executive officer of Maya Cinemas, a theater chain servicing to the United States Latino audience. He is also a partner with Carolyn Caldera in the company Esparza/Caldera Entertainment. He founded film distribution and production company Maya Entertainment in 2007.

Esparza is a promoter of Latino films, and many of his films focus on Chicano themes. He has produced over twenty films, several of them for television, and has won over 200 awards.

A participant in the 1960s-era movement for the civil rights and equality of Mexican Americans, Esparza continues to work with educational, cultural, and professional organizations, especially those that aim to educate Latinos in the business of media production.

== Childhood and education ==
Esparza was born and raised in East Los Angeles, California. His father, a refugee of the Mexican Revolution, migrated to the United States in 1918. His father's awareness of the motivations behind the Revolution imbued him with a strong sense of social justice. As a child, he viewed Spanish language films in the many Los Angeles theaters that offered such fare. Moctesuma was a theatre major in high school. He acted, played the saxophone, and loved movies.

He attended the School of Theater, Film and Television at the University of California, Los Angeles, where he received his B.A. in 1971 and M.F.A. in the same field in 1973. During his sophomore year at UCLA, Moctesuma created an ethno-communications program at the film school. He wrote a proposal, made the curriculum, and created (and was a student in) the first multicultural film program in the United States.

During the 1960s, he participated in the Chicano Movement, advocating for the civil rights of Mexican Americans. He was one of the organizers of the 1968 Chicano Blowouts, a series of youth-led protests inspired by educator Sal Castro in which Mexican-Americans demanded equal educational opportunities. His dealings with the press during the walkouts led to his interest in the media. His 2006 HBO film Walkout is based on the events of the protests.

== Career ==
=== Early years ===
Esparza's earliest work in film was in service to the Chicano Movement. He filmed a speech given by Reies Lopez Tijerina at UCLA, as well as the 1970 Chicano Moratorium against the Vietnam War. The Moratorium footage became his first documentary, Requiem 29. He helped organize Chicano student conferences and the Media Urban Crisis Committee, which analyzed the effects of media on minority communities and recommended that members of those communities attend film school.

=== Producer ===
After graduating from UCLA, he worked for the children's television program Sesame Street, developing bilingual segments. Shortly thereafter, he produced the television pilot and the first season of the PBS program Villa Alegre, which won multiple awards. His first commercial production, Drunk Drivers Get Carried Away, received a Clio Award. He was a producer and writer for the documentary unit of NBC in Los Angeles.

Following the success of Villa Alegre, Esparza became an independent producer of documentaries. He also filmed a production of the Chicano comedy troupe Culture Clash, A Bowl of Beings. His big break into Hollywood cinema was the feature film The Milagro Beanfield War as a partner at Esparza-Katz Productions, where some of his other production credits include Selena and Introducing Dorothy Dandridge.

=== Maya Cinemas ===
In 2005, Esparza opened the first multiplex in the Maya Cinemas chain, a 14-screen theater in Salinas, California. Since then, he has opened 16 other multiplexes in California, with 26 more scheduled to open in Texas. Maya Cinemas primarily shows first-run Hollywood films, sometimes with subtitles in Spanish, but also screens foreign and independent films. The concessions all feature Mayan motifs, hearkening back to the Los Angeles theaters of Esparza's youth.

In 2007, Esparza resigned from the board of trustees of the California State University system. After planning to open a Maya Cinemas at the Campus Pointe Project at California State University, Fresno, a neighboring landholder who also planned to open a cinema presented a legal challenge, charging that Esparza had a conflict of interest in developing the project while sitting on the board of trustees. Although the university ruled that there was no conflict of interest, Esparza resigned, saying that he was doing so out of "respect for the intent of the government code to avoid even the appearance of conflict of interest."

== Awards ==
Moctezuma has won over 200 honors and awards, including an Emmy Award, a Clio Award, an ALMA Award, and a CINE Golden Eagle Award. Additionally, he has been nominated for an Academy Award and a Golden Globe. He received the 1994 Professional Achievement Award from the UCLA Alumni Association. In 2008, Moctesuma was selected as one of the 50 "Most Powerful and Influential Latinos" by The Imagen Foundation.

== Filmography ==
- Taco Shop (2012) (executive producer) (filming)
- Mosquita y Mari (2011) (executive producer) (filming)
- Without Men (2011) (executive producer)
- Across the Line: The Exodus of Charlie Wright (2010) (executive producer)
- Harlem Hostel (2010) (executive producer)
- One Hot Summer (2009) (made for television) (executive producer)
- Moe (2008) (executive producer)
- The Startup (2007) (executive producer)
- Walkout (2006) (HBO)
- Gods and Generals (2003) (executive)
- Price of Glory (2000)
- Introducing Dorothy Dandridge (1999) (executive, made for television)
- Selma, Lord, Selma (1999) (executive, made for television)
- Butter (1998) (executive, released on video as Never 2 Big)
- Rough Riders (1997) (TV) (executive)
- The Disappearance of Garcia Lorca (1997)
- Selena (1997)
- The Avenging Angel (1995) (made for television)
- The Cisco Kid (1994) (TV) (executive)
- Gettysburg (1993)
- The Ambulance (1990)
- The Milagro Beanfield War (1988)
- The Telephone (1988)
- Radioactive Dreams (1985)
- The Ballad of Gregorio Cortez (1982) (made for television)
- Agueda Martinez: Our People, Our Country (1977) (producer)
- Only Once in a Lifetime (1979)
- Villa Alegre (1973) (producer- season 1)
- Selena: The Series (2020) (producer)

== Preservation ==
Requiem-29 was preserved and restored by the UCLA Film & Television Archive from 16mm prints. Restoration funding was provided by the Council on Library and Information Resources and the UCLA Film & Television Archive. The restoration had its world premiere at the 2024 UCLA Festival of Preservation.
