= Vickie Castro =

American activist

- Born: Victoria Castro; August 20, 1945 (age 81); Los Angeles, California, US
- Education: California State University, Los Angeles (BA); University of California, Santa Cruz (MS); Pepperdine University (MS)

Victoria "Vickie" Castro (born August 20, 1945) is an American educator and political activist known for her work with the Young Citizens for Community Action, Brown Berets, and the East L.A. walkouts. Castro went on to work for the Los Angeles Unified School District, and eventually ran for office becoming a member of the LA School Board.

== Background ==
Born in Los Angeles, Castro attended Roosevelt High School. After graduating from Roosevelt, Castro went on to attend California State University, Los Angeles. While in college, she had a political awakening going from a predominantly Mexican-American world to one where they were almost non-existent.

With David Sanchez, in 1966, Castro was part of the Annual Chicano Student Conference at Camp Hess Kramer, where a group of high school students discussed different issues affecting Mexican Americans in their barrios and schools. These high school students formed the Young Chicanos For Community Action, which eventually became the Brown Berets.

As a founding member of the Brown Berets, Castro played a key role in the organization of the East L.A. walkouts on March 6, 1968. Her car was used to pull down a fence surrounding Roosevelt High School. After college she began working as a teacher for Frank Armendariz at Hollenbeck Junior High School, eventually becoming the principal at Belvedere Junior High School.

After 25 years with the Los Angeles Unified School District, and she ran for office in 1993, becoming a member of the LA School Board, the second Latina on the board after Leticia Quezada. In 2001, she left the board to become the principal of Hollenbeck Junior High School.
