= Abraham Lincoln High School (Los Angeles, California) =

Public high school in Los Angeles, California, United States

Coordinates: 34.075°N 118.201°W

Abraham Lincoln Senior High School
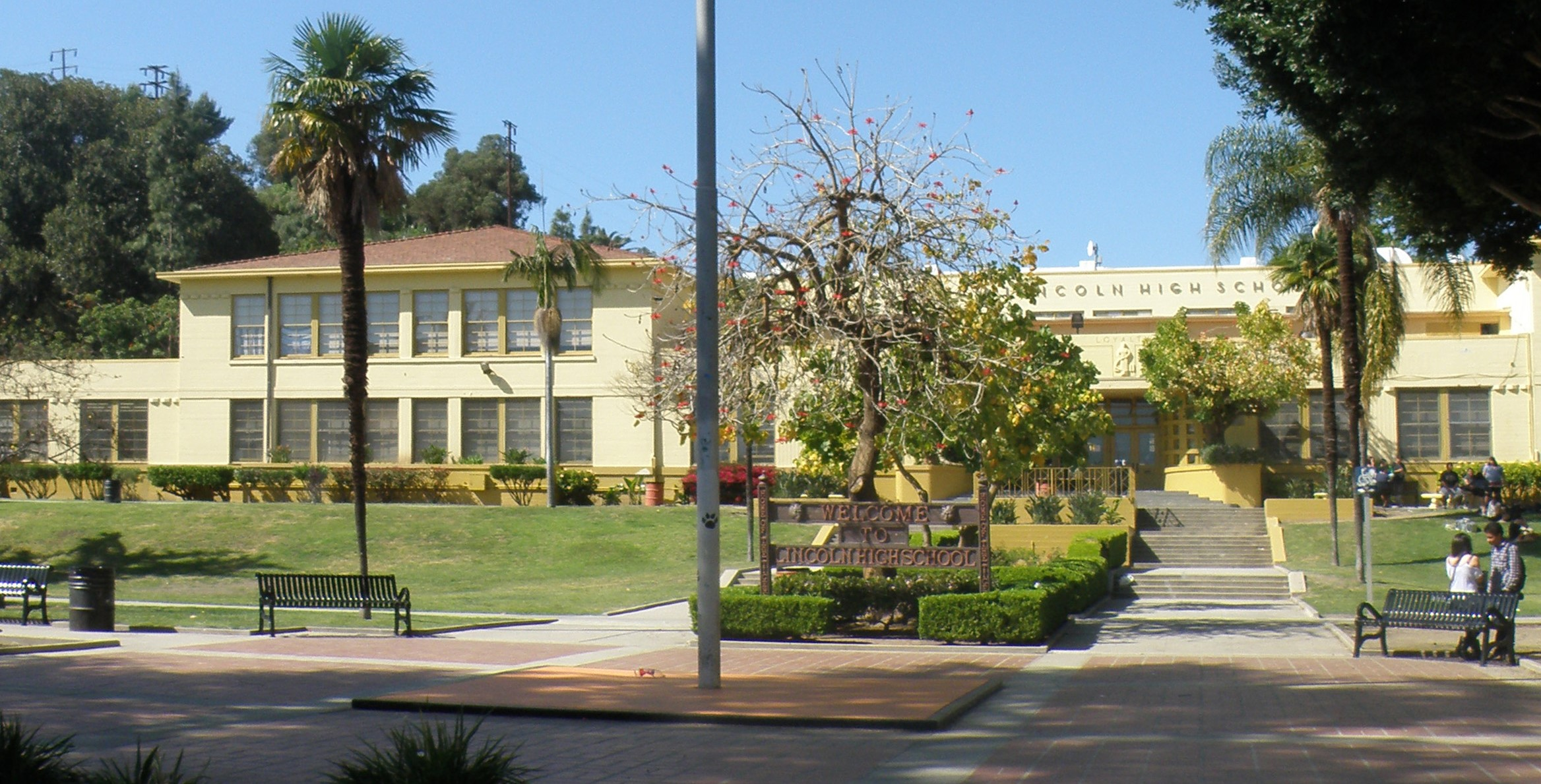

Location
- 3501 N. Broadway; Los Angeles, California 90031; United States

Information
- Type: Public
- Opened: 1878
- Locale: City, Large
- School district: Los Angeles Unified School District
- NCES District ID: 0622710
- NCES School ID: 062271003139
- Principal: Martha Gomez
- Teaching staff: 57.89 (on an FTE basis)
- Grades: 9–12
- Enrollment: 913 (2024–25)
  - Male: 476
  - Female: 437
- Student to teacher ratio: 15.77
- Colors: Black and orange
- Athletics conference: Northern League; CIF Los Angeles City Section
- Mascot: Tiger
- Team name: Lincoln Tigers
- Website: Official website

Abraham Lincoln Senior High, usually referred to simply as Lincoln High School, is a secondary school located in the Lincoln Heights district of Los Angeles, California, United States. Located in the East Los Angeles-area community, surrounded by El Sereno, Chinatown, Boyle Heights and Cypress Park. It is one of 13 public schools in Lincoln Heights. The school is named after Abraham Lincoln, the 16th President of the United States, and was one of the first public high schools established in California. It is one of the District 5 high schools in the Los Angeles Unified School District, the second largest school district in the US.

Lincoln students are drawn from Chinatown and other areas across Los Angeles County.

== History ==
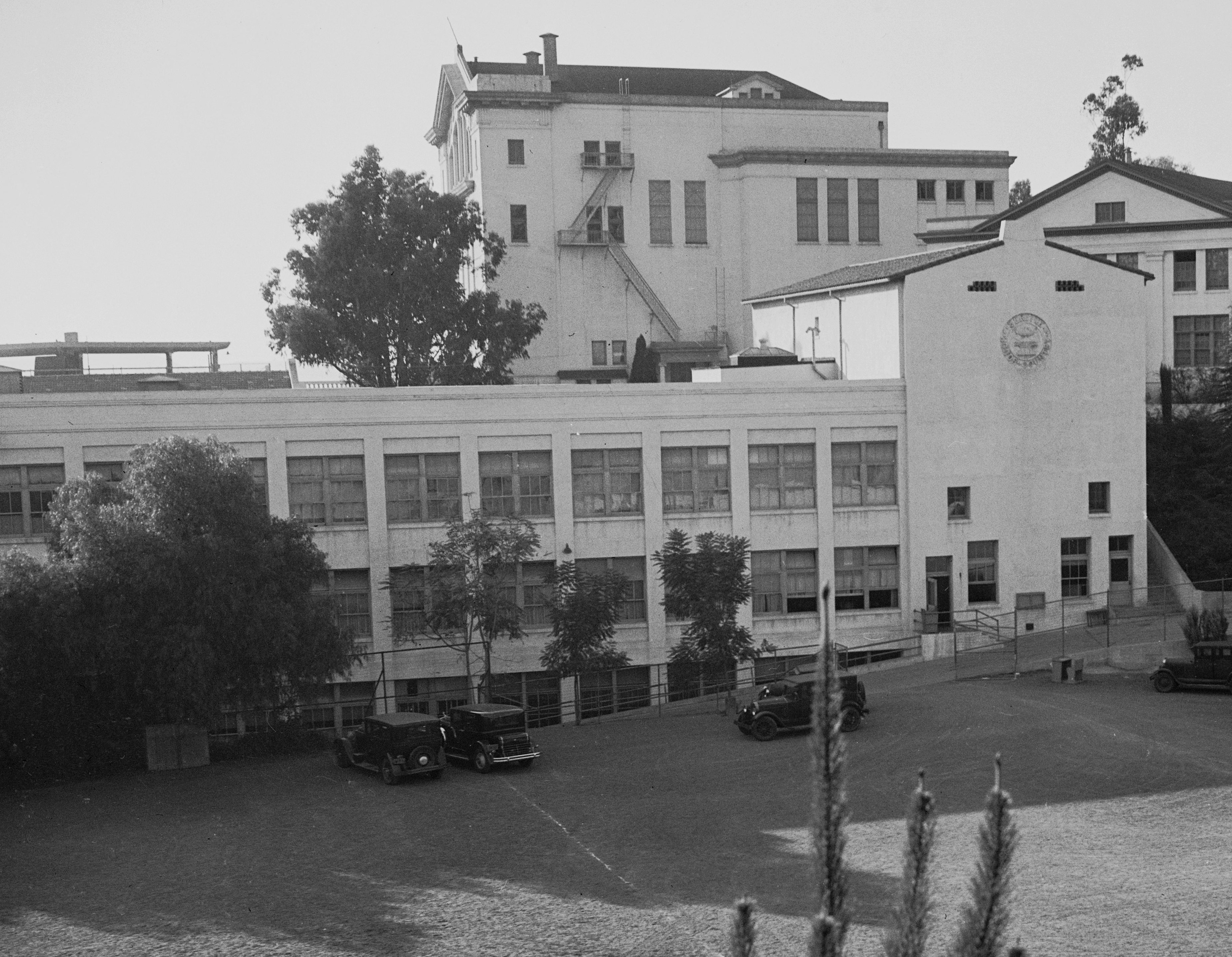
Lincoln High School in the 1920s.

The early history of Lincoln High School is unusually complicated because, over the years, it has served all three of the typical grade configurations—elementary school, middle school and high school. What eventually became Lincoln High School was originally established in 1878 as Avenue 21 Grammar School. By 1913, the Avenue 21 school had become an intermediate school and its student population had grown to the point that a new campus was needed. That year the intermediate school moved to the present Lincoln High School site, and the curriculum expanded to include the senior high school grades. This marks the true beginning of Lincoln High. Pending the construction of a new school (the current site) on the former mansion property of Charles Woolwine, the Avenue 21 intermediate school moved its location to the hillside site (now the current physical education and track field), where students studied under the trees. In the early 1970s, students from all six upper grades attended the school together.

In 1878, the plant was extended across Lincoln Park Avenue, which is now the current site. In 1881, the school added a gymnasium. In 1924, a science building was added. The present school was built extensively in the 1940s under President Franklin D. Roosevelt's Works Progress Administration reform. Much of the construction and renovations occurred after the 1933 Long Beach earthquake, which damaged the gymnasium, the auditorium, the music building, the library and the English building. Jim Tunney Stadium, home to Lincoln's football and track teams, was built during the reconstruction of Lincoln High School.

It was in the Los Angeles City High School District until 1961, when it merged into LAUSD.

Beginning in the latter part of the 1960s, Lincoln High School became a focal point for the emerging Chicano civil rights movement that was fueled by student activism which called for a more culturally sensitive educational curriculum and access to college preparatory courses for Mexican American students. Encouraged by Sal Castro, who championed equal educational opportunity as a Lincoln High faculty member, students at Lincoln organized a mass walk-out in protest of sub-standard facilities, vocational program tracking for Chicano youth and discriminatory practices which excluded them from advanced college prep courses. In March 1968, Lincoln High students led the first wave of what became the largest student strike in the history of public education in US. The "Blow-out" was joined by students from at least three other area high schools, among them Garfield, Roosevelt, Lincoln, Belmont and Wilson.

In 2009 the opening of the Felicitas and Gonzalo Mendez Learning Centers relieved Lincoln.

In 2015, Lincoln High School's baseball team won the CIF Los Angeles City Section Division II baseball championship, defeating Cesar Chavez High School of San Fernando by a score of 3–0 in a game played at Dodger Stadium. It was the school's second baseball championship, and the first one since 1935.

== Demographics ==
Demographics of student body
Ethnic Breakdown	2021	2020	2019
Native Americans	0%	0.3%	0.4%
Hispanic and Latino American	73%	75%	73%
Black	2%	2%	1%
Asian American	24%	21%	23%
Native Hawaiian or other Pacific Islander	0%	0%	0%
White	2%	1%	1%
Multiracial Americans	0.1%	1%	0.5%
Female	48%	49%	47%
Male	52%	51%	53%

Lincoln is mainly made up of a large Hispanic and Asian student body, though there is a smaller African-American and White student population.

In 2019, Lincoln serves around 1,005 students in grades nine to twelve, with a student-teacher ratio of 19:1 (54 full-time teachers).

The racial/ethnic enrollment breaks down as the following (as of the student class of 2008–2009):

- American Indian - 0.3%
- Asian - 30.8%
- Filipino - 0.3%
- Pacific Islander - 0.1%
- Black - 0.9%
- Hispanic - 80.1%
- White - 0.5%

== Academics ==
=== Overview ===
In 2008, Lincoln was ranked as the 900th best high school in the US in the Challenge Index.

US News 2025-2026 Rankings

- 29 in Los Angeles Unified School District High Schools
- 171 in Los Angeles metropolitan area high schools
- 367 in California high schools
- 2,638 in national rankings

US News 2021 Rankings

- 55 in Los Angeles Unified School District High Schools
- 249 in Los Angeles metropolitan area high schools
- 387 in Magnet high schools
- 587 in California high schools
- 3,841 in national rankings

US News 2020 Rankings

- 94 in Los Angeles Unified School District High Schools
- 234 in Los Angeles metropolitan area high schools
- 374 in Magnet high schools
- 565 in California high schools
- 3,810 in national rankings

US News 2019 Rankings

- 241 in Los Angeles metropolitan area high schools
- 350 in Magnet high schools
- 566 in California high schools
- 3,926 in national rankings

=== Magnet ===
Lincoln High School's Magnet program was established in 1999. The Magnet program has a maximum of 226 students, ranging from grade levels 9 to 12. The program offers opportunities for students to participate in courses and activities with an emphasis on science, mathematics and technology.

=== Science Bowl ===
Lincoln has a Science Bowl team that has been running for fifteen years. Lincoln has two teams with 5 students in each team. Competing students must have a knowledge base in astronomy, biology, chemistry, mathematics, physics and general science. Science Bowl uses a buzzer system, in which students must buzz in and wait to be recognized by a moderator before proceeding to answer a question. Lincoln has consistently scored in the top five in the Regional Science Bowl competition.

=== Academic Decathlon ===
Lincoln maintains an Academic Decathlon program for its students. Competing students in the program are placed into one of three teams based on their skill level: Varsity, Scholastic and Honors. The program covers language & literature, economics, art, music, mathematics, social science and science. In addition, students are required to write essays, participate in interviews, give speeches and take part in a Super Quiz, which focuses on a selected subject determined by the United States Academic Decathlon each year.

=== Speech and Debate ===
Formed in 2008, Lincoln is one of the 15 schools that are a part of the Los Angeles Metropolitan Debate League (LAMDL). LAMDL is one of the networks of Urban Debate Leagues that promotes debate for many urban high schools. In 2009, the Los Angeles Urban Debate League (as it was previously known) merged with a USC's Neighborhood Debate League, creating LAMDL.

Lincoln has a highly successful policy debate team, competing and winning major tournaments both locally and nationally. Lincoln has won some of the most prestigious tournaments in California, including the California State Invitational held at the University of California Berkeley as well as the Pepperdine Invitational Debates, and clearing into eliminations in tournaments like the University of Southern California's David Damus Trojan Championships. In 2009, Lincoln won four of the six local tournaments, winning City Championships, and, in 2010, won five of the six local tournaments. In 2009, Lincoln debated at the Chase Urban Debate Nationals, held in Chicago, and returned to the Nationals again in 2010, clearing into eliminations, and again in 2011, placing fifth overall.

=== Academic Performance Index (API) ===
API for Lincoln High School.

School	2007	2008	2009	2010	2011	2012	2013
Abraham Lincoln High School	594	609	588	616	643	761	738

== Feeder patterns ==
A majority of the students come from Florence Nightingale Middle School, El Sereno Middle School.

== Notable alumni ==
- Rodolfo Acosta, actor
- Gregory Ain, architect
- Ethel Percy Andrus, principal 1917–1944, founder AARP, first female high school principal in California
- Sam Balter (1909–1998), basketball player
- Eddie Cano, Afro-Cuban jazz and Latin jazz pianist
- Gaylord Carter, organist
- Bobby Castillo, former Los Angeles Dodgers and Minnesota Twins pitcher
- Sal Castro, activist (faculty)
- Eldridge Cleaver, writer - Soul on Ice
- John Conte, actor
- John Doucette, actor
- Sue Kunitomi Embrey, Japanese-American teacher, activist and Manzanar intern
- Moctesuma Esparza, director, producer
- Jackie Fields (Jacob Finkelstein; 1908–1987), boxer who twice won the World Welterweight Championship
- Jennifer Love Hewitt, actress/singer
- John Huston, director/actor
- Fidel LaBarba, boxer, sportswriter, gold medalist 1924 Olympics (Paris)
- José Limón, choreographer
- Carlos R. Moreno, California Supreme Court Justice (Cl. of 1966)
- Sadao Munemori, Medal of Honor recipient
- Jeanette Nolan, actress
- Robert Preston, actor
- Ref Sanchez, actor and fashion photographer
- Jim Tunney, L. A. Unified School District administrator, NFL referee
- Alberto Valdés (painter), class of 1936
- Kenny Washington, (NFL) professional American football player
- Robert Young, actor

== In the news/media ==
Abraham Lincoln High School is used prominently as both itself and the fictional "Clayton College" in the 1927 Buster Keaton film College and briefly appears at the end of the movie Walkout (a real life video in the end credits).
