= David Sanchez (activist) =

American activist

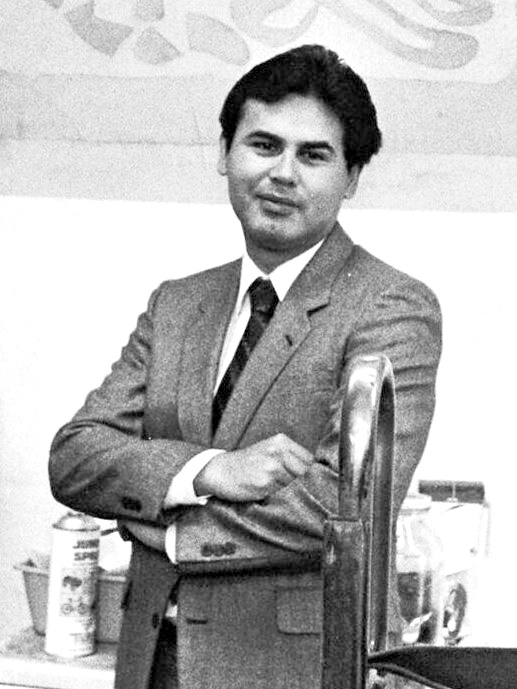
- Sanchez in 1983
- Born: David John Sanchez; June 17, 1947 (age 78); Los Angeles, California, US
- Known for: Civil rights activist

David Sanchez (born June 17, 1947) is an American civil rights activist, and founding member of the Brown Berets. In the 1960s and 70s he was heavily involved in the Chicano civil rights and political movements.

== Background ==
An accomplished student in high school, in 1966 Sanchez chaired Mayor Sam Yorty's youth council. However personal experiences with police brutality from the LAPD radicalized his politics and world view. With other high school students, Sanchez helped found the Young Chicanos for Community Action. With his leadership, the Young Chicanos For Community Action eventually became the Brown Berets. The Brown Berets advocated for better schools and the fair treatment of Mexican-Americans in Los Angeles. The organization also worked on farmworkers' rights, opposition to the Vietnam War, and organizing against police brutality.

Known as the "Prime Minister," Sanchez played a key role in the organization of the Chicano Moratorium and the East L.A. walkouts. In 1969, Sanchez and the Brown Berets established the East LA Free Clinic on Whittier Boulevard. He was at the National Chicano Moratorium March on August 29, 1970, and was friends with journalist Ruben Salazar who was killed that day.

In 1972, Sanchez led the Occupation of Catalina Island, which was meant to draw attention on the continuing struggles of Mexican-Americans in the United States.

After disbanding the Brown Berets, Sanchez went to work for the Los Angeles County Department of Health Services, and taught Mexican American Studies at several community colleges in Los Angeles county. In 2005, Sanchez ran for the Los Angeles City Council District 14 seat, losing to José Huizar, and in 2012 he ran in the race for California's 40th congressional district, losing to Lucille Roybal-Allard.

== Published works ==
- Sanchez, David (1989). Social Communication for Everyone. Pan American Institute. ASIN B00072Z64Q.
- Sanchez, David (1978). Expedition Through Aztlán. La Puente, CA: Perspective Publications.
