= Woodrow Wilson High School (Los Angeles) =

Public high school in California, United States

Coordinates: 34.069835°N 118.186298°W

Woodrow Wilson Senior High School
- 4500 Multnomah Street; El Sereno, Los Angeles; California 90032; United States

Information
- Type: Public
- Motto: "Once a Mule, Always a Mule"
- Established: 1937 (first campus), 1970 (second campus)
- Locale: City, Large
- School district: Los Angeles Unified School District
- NCES District ID: 0622710
- NCES School ID: 062271003466
- Principal: Dr. Gregorio Verbera
- Faculty: 135
- Teaching staff: 84.20 (on an FTE basis)
- Grades: 9–12
- Enrollment: 1,260 (2024–25)
  - Male: 652
  - Female: 608
- Student to teacher ratio: 14.96
- Colors: Navy blue, Vegas gold and white
- Athletics: Baseball, football, boys' and girls' soccer, softball, track & field, cross country, boys' and girls' basketball, cheer, drill team, boys' and girls' tennis, boys' and girls' volleyball boys' and girls' swim team
- Athletics conference: Northern League; CIF Los Angeles City Section
- Mascot: Mighty Mule (Seymour)
- Rivals: Abraham Lincoln High School, Benjamin Franklin High School
- Information: Architect: Paul Williams
- Website: Official website

Woodrow Wilson High School is a Los Angeles Unified School District (LAUSD) high school in the Northeast region of Los Angeles, California, United States. It is located in the community of El Sereno, atop the Ascot Hills at 4500 Multnomah Street.

The school serves the El Sereno and University Hills communities, and areas of City Terrace and Ramona Gardens. It is near the Ascot Hills park, the neighborhood of Hillside Terrace, and the Multnomah Street Environmental Science Magnet. Wilson High, with an enrollment of approximately 1,500 students, is under the direct supervision of LAUSD Local District East, Board District 2.

The school colors are Navy blue, Vegas gold and White. The school's mascot is the "Mighty Mule", a mule also nicknamed "Seymour".

== History ==
The original Wilson High School campus opened in 1937 on Eastern Avenue, in what is now the El Sereno Middle School campus. Classes were separated into winter and summer classes and took place in tents and old bungalows. The first gym was begun just before World War II and was completed in 1942. The first class to graduate was in the winter of 1940 with a class of 40 students.

The original site at one time had been a mule farm, which is one reason a mule was chosen as the school mascot. Other reasons cited were to honor the important pre-mechanization role 200,000+ mules played during World War I when Woodrow Wilson was president, and to acknowledge Woodrow Wilson's association with the Democratic Party whose symbol is the mule or donkey. It was in the Los Angeles City High School District until 1961, when it merged into LAUSD.

In 1970, Woodrow Wilson Senior High School moved to its current location on Multnomah Street. The new 37-acre campus and buildings were constructed between 1968–1969 and designed by the renowned African American architect Paul Revere Williams. It was an engineering challenge to excavate over one million cubic yards of earth to re-grade the hilltop and to use 3,500 tons of structural steel for the main buildings. The new Wilson High was the first LAUSD school to implement multi-floored buildings equipped with elevators and escalators to accommodate students with disabilities.

In 2012 Woodrow Wilson High School celebrated its 75th anniversary.

=== Chicano Movement on campus ===
In late 1967 East Los Angeles had a school system entrenched in racial disparities. It led to the local beginning of the Chicano Movement. The Mexican American community had the highest high school dropout rate and lowest college attendance among any ethnic group. Poor facilities and constant underestimation of student capabilities by teachers created an atmosphere that impeded learning for some students. Feelings of oppressive conditions coupled with the inability to make changes compelled students, activists, and teachers to meet and discuss the situation. They decided that making their plight public was the best way to pressure the school board for education reform.

Lincoln High School teacher Sal Castro, along with student leaders from the five public schools in East Los Angeles (Roosevelt, Wilson, Lincoln, Garfield, and Belmont High Schools), including Wilson student Paula Crisostomo; college students including Moctesuma Esparza; and groups including the United Mexican American Students (UMAS) and the Brown Berets developed 36 demands to bring to the Los Angeles Board of Education. These goals included bilingual education and bicultural education, Latino teachers and administrators, smaller class sizes, better facilities, and the revision of textbooks to include Mexican American history.

==== Walkouts: "Blowouts" ====
After none of the 36 goals and demands were met, students threatened walkouts, which they called "Blowouts." Funds for Los Angeles public schools were allocated based on the number of students in class each day. By walking out of homeroom before attendance was taken, the students could target the schools financially.

An ad hoc committee, UMAS, and college students established Blowout Committees at other schools such as Theodore Roosevelt High School, Lincoln High School, and Garfield High School, plus a central coordinating committee. These committee meetings were known to be infiltrated by plainclothes policemen.

The incident which prematurely triggered the blowouts was when Wilson High principal Donald Skinner canceled a student production of Neil Simon's Barefoot in the Park, citing it as too risqué for a Mexican American audience. Although Wilson was not one of the original three schools intending to walk out, 300 students did so on March 1, 1968. The administration had senior students blockade the main exit, but the students found alternatives, pushing the school entry gates back and forth as other students inside demonstrated by throwing fruit, books and other items over the gate. Police and photographers showed up on the scene, and the students were told to return to class. Some refused, forming sit-ins and rallies. As a symbol of the walkouts, students wore the image of a foot on their clothes.

The walkouts or blowouts, which began with the March 1, 1968 walkout at Wilson, are credited as seminal events of the Chicano Movement:

"The blowouts resulted in the gradual beginning of various reforms, including bilingual education, Chicano studies, more emphasis on academic subjects, more encouragement of Mexican American students going to college, and more Mexican-American teachers and administrators. ... Many problems continued – and still do – but what had changed was the consciousness of Chicanos both among students and in the community concerning the need to fight for educational justice. There is no question about the significance of the blowouts in the history of the Chicano movement and in Chicano history."

— Garcia, Mario T. "Blowout: Sal Castro and the Chicano Struggle for Educational Justice.

==== National Trust for Historic Preservation ====
The National Trust for Historic Preservation publishes an annual list spotlighting important examples of the United States' architectural and cultural heritage that are at risk of destruction or irreparable damage. In 2018, five Walkout Schools were recognized as "tangible representations of the power of student activism [which] are now threatened, as some of the buildings face calls for demolition by the school district." The Wilson High School blowouts occurred in the old campus, which is now El Sereno Middle School, and it is the original campus that was recognized.

=== 1970s Championship Football Teams ===
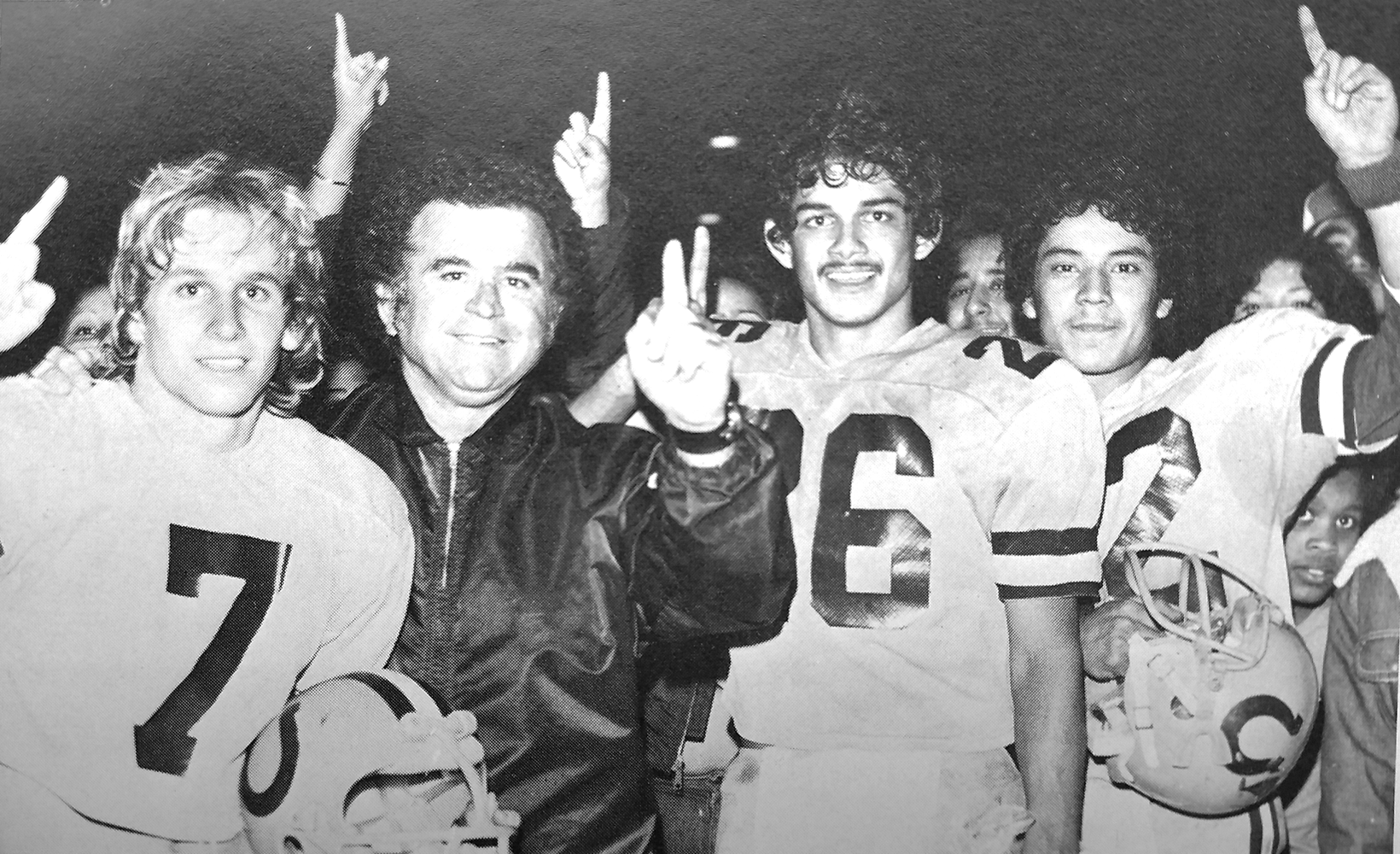
Wilson HS 1977 Champions. Left to right: Ron Cuccia, Coach Vic Cuccia, Steve Martinez, Eddie Martinez.

During the 1970s, Wilson's football coach was the legendary Vic Cuccia. He led the Mighty Mules to a 39-game winning streak, taking the team to win the City's Section 3-A championship in 1975, 1976, and 1977, and 1978. His teams were notable for an unconventional offense, heavily dependent on passing with four receivers and one running back which was difficult for traditional defenses to stop.

Cuccia's own son, Ron Cuccia, was the team's quarterback from 1975–77, during which time he set city and state records for passing, accounted for 145 touchdowns, and set a national record for total offense with 11,451 yards. That included 8,804 yards and 91 touchdowns for passing alone. During the 1978 championship season Steve Clarkson was the quarterback. All star receiver Eddie Martinez graduated in 1978, played Division I football in college. Martinez later returned to Wilson as a teacher, coaching the Mules from 1993-2017 and compiling a record of 176-149-0.

Coach Vic Cuccia, during his 22 years as the football coach (1956–1977), compiled a 151–42–6 record. He was also a teacher, serving all his 44 teaching years at Wilson High School. Cuccia grew up in El Sereno and was an alumnus of Wilson, graduating in 1945. Wilson High School's football stadium was renamed in his honor in September 1999—the football field had already been dedicated in honor of Paul Barthel, a former Wilson teacher. Cuccia died in January 2008, at the age of 80.

==== Controversy ====
National attention was drawn to a September, 1977 game between Wilson and its rival Lincoln High School. The Wilson Mules gained a 63-0 lead by half time and in response the Lincoln team got on its bus and went home, forfeiting the game instead of taking the field for the second half. This triggered national debate over unsportsmanlike behavior on both sides. Criticism was leveled at Lincoln for quitting while Wilson was criticized for unnecessarily running up the score and taking advantage of an undermatched team. At the time, the Los Angeles City Interscholatic Athletic Committee investigated the matter and called both coaches to testify. The controversy was even noted in Coach Vic Cuccia's obituary over 30 years later.

The New York Times reported at the time that the Lincoln Tigers had won only 1 one game in the previous 4 years while the Wilson Mules were on a multi-year 33 game winning streak. Lincoln began the season with 33 players, but 1 was shot to death, 8 left the school due to racial tension, 4 were age ineligible, and at game time 2 others were injured. Depending on the account, Lincoln coach Dave Loera started the game with 13-16 healthy players, but with the injuries during the game only 9 available players remained. Thus, he consulted with the Lincoln principal who was also in attendance and together they told the officials that as a matter of health and safety they needed to stop. Coach Cuccia disputed that saying Loera (who was a Wilson alumnus and former assistant coach to Cuccia) actually had 24-26 players, depending on the account. He characterized the walkout as disgraceful, stating, "It takes only 11 to play. I had promised my first string that they would play the whole first half because they deserved it. I don't like the idea of quitting. You don't teach kids that. Quitting isn't part of this country's philosophy. ... In football or in life, its something you just don't do". In an interview a year later, Cuccia commented that he was trying to give his players a chance to set records so colleges would notice them.

In that half-game the Mules scored 9 touchdowns; 49 points in the 1st quarter and 42 points in the 2nd quarter. In addition, Cal-Hi Sports, which keeps records of secondary school sports, stated that Wilson attempted 7 onside kicks and recovered 5, a record that will never be broken. In gridiron football, after a team scores it normally turns the ball over to the opponent in a following play as a kickoff; but an onside kick is a deliberately short kickoff intended to keep possession of the ball instead.

=== People's Garden ===
In 2011, a plot at an informal back entrance to the campus was converted to a community garden, the People's Garden at Woodrow Wilson High School. Unlike school gardens whose purpose is largely an outgrowth of regular school work and an effort engage children in the outdoors, the People's Garden was created as a community-building enterprise. It was organized and is maintained by a collective of students, teachers and community members. The focus is on growing plants that reflect the communities of El Sereno such as corns, beans and squash of Mesoamerical and medicinal plants from China. Since 2013, a Facebook page has been active in promoting the People's Garden activities.

=== Popular culture ===
In 2015, Woodrow Wilson High School served as a television series filming location with both exterior and interior shots used in the production of Fear the Walking Dead. The AMC series pilot and early episodes of Fear the Walking Dead involved characters that worked and attended the fictional "Paul R. Williams High School." As noted above, that is the name of the actual architect who designed the real campus and buildings.

== Performance and demographics statistics ==
Demographics of student body
Ethnic breakdown	2021	2020	2019
Native Americans	0.4%	0.4%	0.3%
Hispanic and Latino American	93%	92%	93%
African American	2%	2%	2%
Asian American	3%	3%	3%
Native Hawaiian or other Pacific Islander	0.1%	0.1%	0.1%
White	2%	2%	1%
Multiracial Americans	0%	0.4%	0.4%
Female	47%	48%	48%
Male	53%	52%	52%

In 2019 Wilson serves around 1,517 students in grades nine through twelve, with a student-teacher ratio of 20:1. Full-time teachers 75.

The school's graduation rate in 2005 was 61.7%. The school's California API (Academic Performance Index) score was 562 for 2006, and of its student population, 77% were in a Free/Reduced Lunch Program and 30% were designated as English Learners. 8% of the students participated in a GATE program. The student body was 93% Hispanic, 4.8% Asian, 1.5% black, 0.5% white and 0.2% Native American. The API score for 2010 was 615, and it jumped up to 637 the following year.

After Wilson became a magnet school and part of the International Baccalaureate program (see below), more recent data from 2015 show improvements. At the time of that study the demographics were essentially the same as before in ethnic breakdown, but down to 15% in English Learners and up to 88% in Free/Reduced Lunch Program. Academic measures showed increases in an API score of 653 and a graduation rate of 85% for that year.

For context, an API score of 615 in the year of 2010 placed Wilson in the 31st percentile of all high schools in the entire state of California and the 35th percentile of Los Angeles County high schools. (The API score was abolished in March 2017 and replaced with the California School Dashboard, thus more recent comparisons of this type are no longer possible.)

=== U.S. News 2021 rankings ===
- 83 in Los Angeles Unified School District High Schools
- 325 in Los Angeles metropolitan area High Schools
- 511 in Magnet High Schools
- 875 in California High Schools
- 6,279 in National Rankings

=== U.S. News 2020 rankings ===
- 127 in Los Angeles Unified School District High Schools
- 297 in Los Angeles metropolitan area High Schools
- 491 in Magnet High Schools
- 797 in California High Schools
- 5,979 in National Rankings

=== U.S. News 2019 rankings ===
- 270 in Los Angeles metropolitan area High Schools
- 389 in Magnet High Schools
- 669 in California High Schools
- 4,623 in National Rankings

=== Academic Performance Index ===
A comparison of the former Academic Performance Index (API) for high schools in the LAUSD District 5 and local small public charter high schools in the East Los Angeles region up until 2012 is as follows:

School	2007	2008	2009	2010	2011	2012
Francisco Bravo Medical Magnet High School	807	818	815	820	832	842
Marc and Eva Stern Math and Science School	718	792	788	788	809	785
Oscar De La Hoya Animo Charter High School	662	726	709	710	744	744
James A. Garfield High School	553	597	593	632	705	706
Abraham Lincoln High School	594	609	588	616	643	684
Woodrow Wilson High School	582	585	600	615	636	648
Theodore Roosevelt High School	557	551	576	608		
Thomas Jefferson High School	457	516	514	546	546	589
Santee Education Complex		502	521	552	565	612

== The Hitching Post ==
The Hitching Post is a bi-monthly publication by Wilson's Journalism class. It originated as the school's newspaper, which began around 1941. However, there is some confusion about the number of volumes printed so far because the newspaper changed names several times.

== Alumni ==
Notable alumni include:

- Luis Alfaro – playwright, writer, performance artist. Recipient of the MacArthur Fellowship "Genius" Award (1997)
- Ben Davidson – former NFL player with the Green Bay Packers (1961), Washington Redskins (1962–1963), and Oakland Raiders (1964–1971)
- Ron Hull – played football at UCLA in the 1950s and early 60s
- Anthony Denham – NFL player with the Houston Texans (2014–2015) and Philadelphia Eagles (2016–2018)
- Lilian Katz – noted scholar and author on early childhood education
- Clairissa Riccio a.k.a. Claire Sinclair – Playboy 2011 Playmate of the Year
- Armando Vega – champion gymnast (1950s–60s), NCAA gymnastics coach (1960s–1980s), and two time Olympian (1956, 1964)

== See also ==
- Eastside Los Angeles topics
- International Baccalaureate schools in California
