= Marc and Eva Stern Math and Science School =

Alliance Marc and Eva Stern Math and Science School
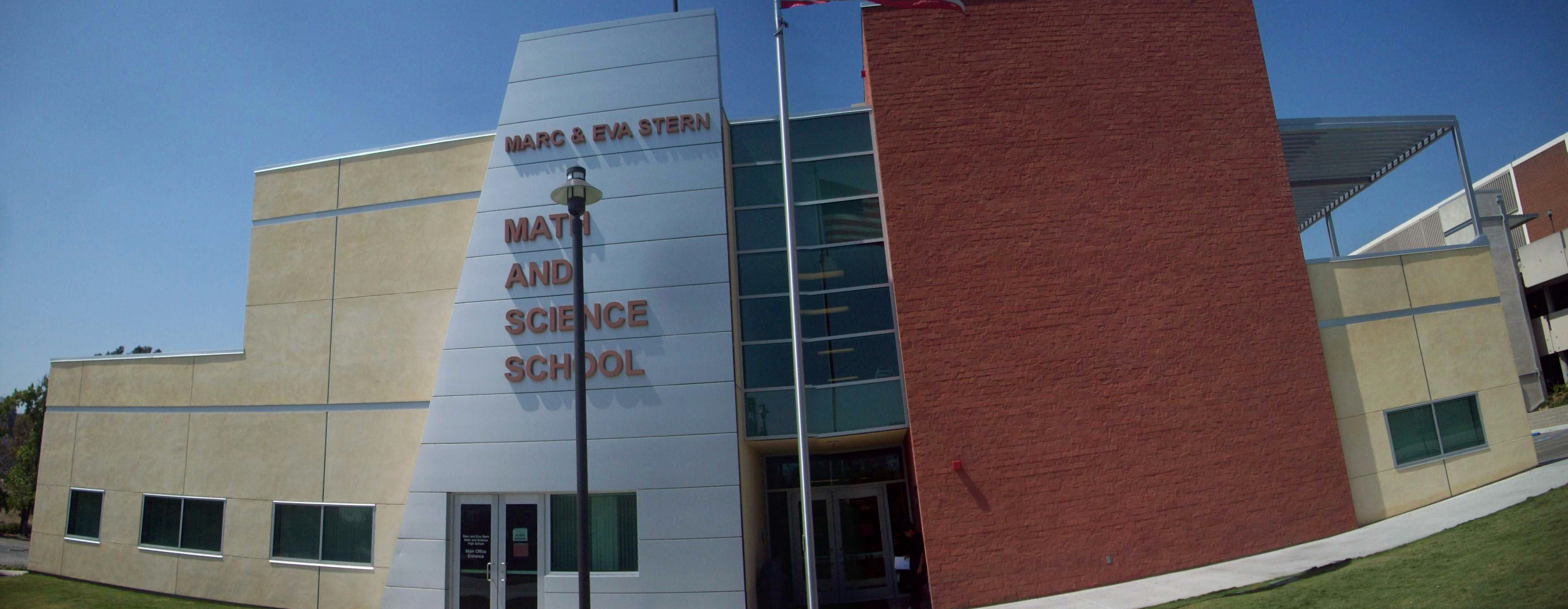

Location
- 5151 State University Drive; Los Angeles, California; United States; 34.06365°N 118.17081°W

Information
- Type: Charter
- Established: 2006
- School district: Los Angeles Unified School District
- Principal: Dr. Evelyn Garcia
- Grades: 9–12
- Enrollment: 584
- Colors: Blue & Gray
- Mascot: Titan
- Affiliation: California State University, Los Angeles
- Website: Official website

Alliance Marc and Eva Stern Math and Science School, also known as The Stern Math and Science School or Stern MASS, is a charter high school in the University Hills neighborhood in the City of Los Angeles. It is a collaboration between the Alliance for College-Ready Public Schools and California State University, Los Angeles (Cal State L.A). The charter was granted by the Los Angeles Unified School District in 2006.

== History ==
Stern MASS is one of many schools managed by the Alliance for College-Ready Public Schools. The school broke ground on September 10, 2007, on the California State University, Los Angeles (Cal State L.A.) Campus, moving into the building on November 3, 2008. The school is named for Marc Stern, the Chairman of the TCW Group, and his wife, Eva.

Stern MASS began in 2006 in small bungalows on Whittier Bl and Atlantic Bl, then in 2007, it moved to Cal State LA Lot 7. It was there until 2008 when the school moved to their permanent facility on November 3, 2008, located next to Parking Lot 2 on the campus of Cal State LA.

The music program at the school won the 2013 SupportMusic Merit Award.

== Student uniform colors ==
● Grade 9 = White ● Grade 10 = Sports gray ● Grade 11 = Navy blue ● Grade 12 = Charcoal gray

== US News rankings ==
=== US News 2021 rankings ===
- 22 in Los Angeles metropolitan area High Schools
- 54 in California High Schools
- 91 in Charter High Schools
- 397 in National Rankings

=== US News 2020 rankings ===
- 5 in Los Angeles Unified School District High Schools
- 16 in Los Angeles metropolitan area High Schools
- 43 in California High Schools
- 84 in Charter High Schools
- 361 in National Rankings

=== US News 2019 rankings ===
- 28 in Los Angeles metropolitan area High Schools
- 78 in California High Schools
- 114 in Charter High Schools
- 556 in National Rankings

== Student enrollment ==
Stern MASS serves around 584 students in grades nine through twelve, with a student-teacher ratio of 19:1. Full-time teachers 31.

Demographics of student body
Ethnic Breakdown	2021	2020	2019
Native Americans	0.2%	0.2%	1%
Hispanic and Latino American	95%	95%	94%
African American	1%	1%	1%
Asian American	2%	2%	2%
Native Hawaiian or other Pacific Islander	0.2%	0.2%	0%
White	2%	2%	2%
Multiracial Americans	0.5%	0%	0%
Female	48%	49%	48%
Male	52%	51%	52%

== Academic Performance Index (API) ==
API for High Schools in the East Los Angeles region.

School	2007	2008	2009	2010	2011	2012	2013
Francisco Bravo Medical Magnet High School	807	818	815	820	832	842	847
Marc and Eva Stern Math and Science School	718	792	788	788	809	785	775
Oscar De La Hoya Animo Charter High School	662	726	709	710	744	744	738
James A. Garfield High School	553	597	593	632	705	710	714
Abraham Lincoln High School	594	609	588	616	643	761	738
Woodrow Wilson High School	582	585	600	615	636		
Theodore Roosevelt High School	557	551	576	608		793	788
Thomas Jefferson High School	457	516	514	546	546		
Santee Education Complex		502	521	552	565	612	636
