= Alliance College-Ready Public Schools =

Charter school operator in Los Angeles, California

Coordinates: 34°2′47″N 118°15′43″W

Alliance College-Ready Public Schools (LA Alliance) is one of the largest nonprofit public charter school networks in the nation, operating 26 high-performing, public charter middle and high schools that educate nearly 13,000 scholars from Los Angeles’ most underserved communities. The mission of the organization is for 75% or more of the scholars to graduate from a four-year college or university.

== Schools ==
As of 2025, Alliance College-Ready Public Schools operates 16 high schools and 9 middle schools.

High Schools

- Alliance Cindy & Bill Simon Technology Academy HS, South Los Angeles/Watts, East Los Angeles
- Alliance Ted K. Tajima High School, Downtown Los Angeles
- Alliance Collins Family College-Ready High School, Huntington Park
- Alliance Dr Olga Mohan High School, Downtown Los Angeles
- Alliance Gertz-Ressler High School, Downtown Los Angeles
- Alliance Health Services Academy High School, South Los Angeles/Watts, East Los Angeles
- Alliance Judy Ivie Burton Technology Academy High School, South Los Angeles/Watts, East Los Angeles
- Alliance Leichtman-Levine Family Foundation Environmental Science High School, Glassell Park/Lincoln Heights
- Alliance Marc & Eva Stern Math and Science High School, East Los Angeles
- Alliance Margaret M. Bloomfield High School, Walnut Park, California
- Alliance Marine High School, Sun Valley
- Alliance Morgan McKinzie High School, East Los Angeles
- Alliance Patti & Peter Neuwirth Leadership Academy, South Los Angeles/Watts, East Los Angeles
- Alliance Renee & Meyer Luskin Academy High School, South Los Angeles/Watts, East Los Angeles
- Alliance Susan & Eric Smidt Technology High School, Glassell Park/Lincoln Heights
- Alliance William & Carol Ouchi High School, Hyde Park/Watts, South Los Angeles/East Los Angeles

Middle Schools

- Alliance Christine O’Donovan Middle Academy, South Los Angeles/Watts
- Alliance College-Ready Middle Academy 4, South Los Angeles/Watts
- Alliance College-Ready Middle Academy 8, East Los Angeles
- Alliance College-Ready Middle Academy 12, South Los Angeles/Watts
- Alliance Milt and Debbie Valera Middle Academy, Sun Valley
- Alliance Jack H. Skirball Middle School, South Los Angeles/Watts
- Alliance Kory Hunter Middle School (formerly Alliance College-Ready Middle Academy 9), Huntington Park
- Alliance Richard Merkin Middle School, Downtown Los Angeles
- Alliance Valera Middle School, Sun Valley

== History ==
LA Alliance was created in 2004 by business and community leaders involved in the Los Angeles Educational Alliance For Restructuring Now (LEARN) reform effort of the early 1990s in the Los Angeles Unified School District.

Following massive budget issues at Inner City Education Foundation (ICEF) Public Schools, another charter school organization in Los Angeles, there were rumors that LA Alliance would take over the ICEF schools in March 2011. Former LA Mayor Richard Riordan was negotiating the merger as a member of both boards of directors. The combined organization would have operated 30 schools with over 12,000 students, however the deal fell through over financial concerns and other complications.

== Teachers ==
Since March 2015, teachers at LA Alliance have been engaged in a union organizing campaign. That month, 70 teachers told LA Alliance that they wanted the United Teachers Los Angeles (UTLA) to represent them and asked the company to refrain from interfering.

LA Alliance created a website called Our Alliance Community that opposes the organizing effort. UTLA filed three unfair labor practice (ULP) charges with California’s Public Employment Relations Board (PERB) in August 2015 that accuses LA Alliance of retaliation and refusing to meet with union organizers. In October 2015, PERB asked the court for injunctive relief (at this time there were four ULP’s on file). The Los Angeles County Superior Court issued a temporary restraining order on October 30 and ordered LA Alliance to not “coerce or ask teachers about their positions on unionization, must allow organizers to come onto school grounds, cannot block emails from the union, and must stay 100 feet away from UTLA organizers.”

== Leadership ==
Judy Burton, a long time Los Angeles Unified School District (LAUSD) employee, left the district in 2003 to help found LA Alliance. She served as President/CEO until returning to the district in December 2014. The following month, Dan Katzir took over as President/CEO. Katzir previously worked as a consultant and as the Managing Director of the Broad Foundation. Pablo Cesar Villavicencio is the current CEO.

Former LAUSD principal Howard Lappin was hired for school year 2004-05 to run College-Ready Academy High School. He helped turnaround Foshay Learning Center.
