= University Hills, Los Angeles =

University Hills
- Neighborhood of Los Angeles
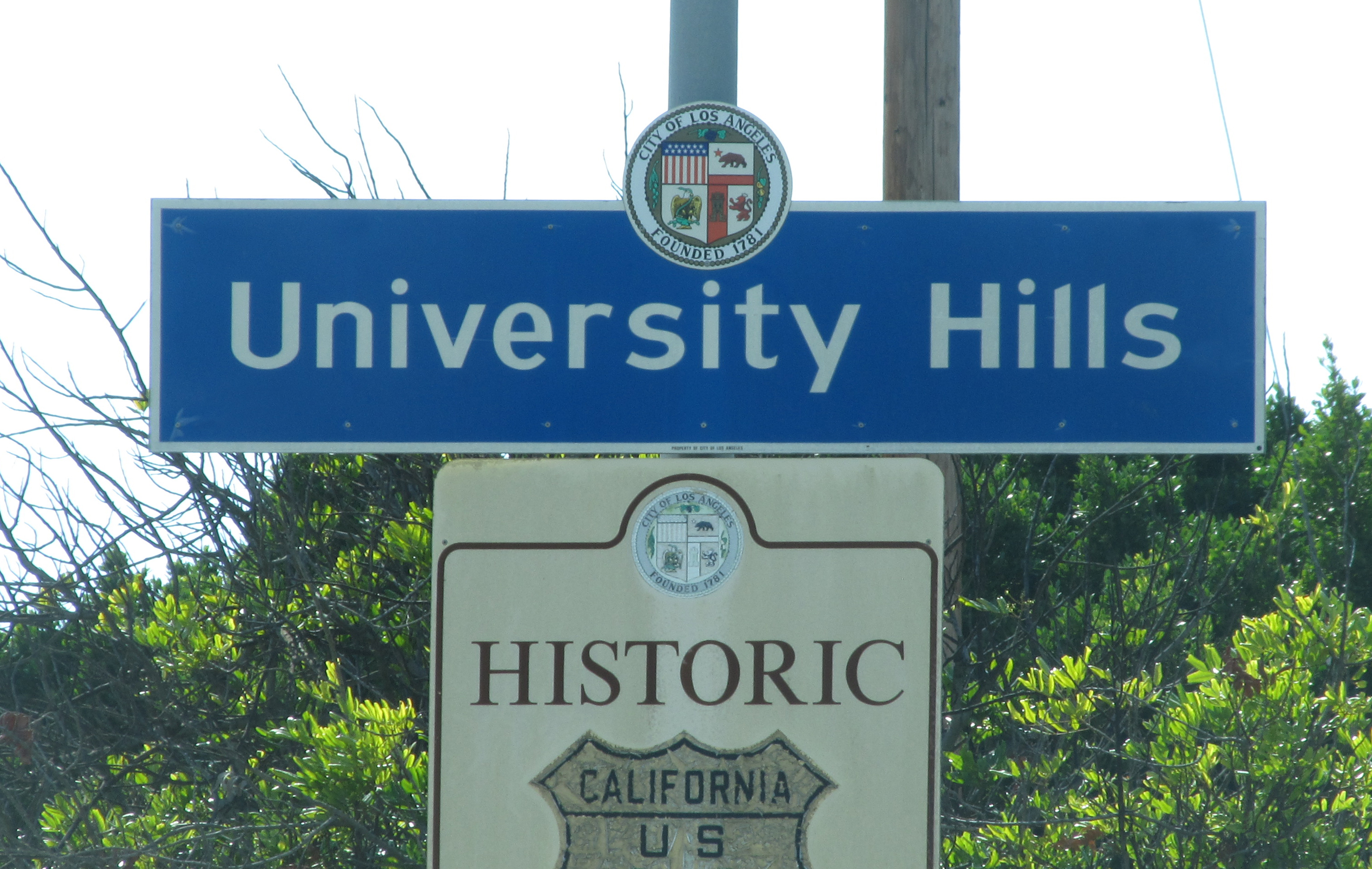
- University Hills neighborhood sign located at the intersection of Valley Boulevard and Highbury Avenue

- Location within Central Los Angeles
- Coordinates: 34.066667°N 118.167778°W
- Country: United States
- State: California
- County: Los Angeles
- City: Los Angeles
- Time zone: UTC-8 (PST)
  - Summer (DST): UTC-7 (PDT)

University Hills is a neighborhood on the East Side of Los Angeles, California. It consists of the residential areas surrounding California State University, Los Angeles.

== History ==
University Hills is in the eastern San Rafael Hills. They were part of the Pre-columbian homeland of the Tongva Indians for thousands of years, and they named this area Otsunga (place of roses).

It is the former site of one of California's 36 original adobes, built in 1776 by Franciscan missionaries, and destroyed by a fire in 1908. The area was part of the 1831 Mexican land grant of Rancho Rosa Castilla, given to Juan Ballesteros by Alta California Governor Manuel Victoria. It was named for the abundant amount of native Wood roses (Rosa californica) along the creek.

In 1852, after statehood, the title passed to Jean-Baptiste Batz and his wife, Catalina. He was a Basque immigrant rancher from northern Spain. In 1882, after both died, the land was divided among six of their children.

For most of its history, University Hills was a neighborhood within El Sereno, which was developed more than a century ago with the expansion of the Pacific Electric Railway Red Car lines. In the 1990s, the community's homeowners association lobbied for renaming the area. In 2004, the City of Los Angeles designated the residential community surrounding California State University Los Angeles as "University Hills". The increase in Southern California real estate values in the early 2000s attracted professionals looking for alternative neighborhoods to more distant suburbs and the Westside.

== Geography ==
University Hills was designated an official Los Angeles neighborhood in October 2004. It is bounded by Mariana Avenue on the west, Valley Boulevard on the north, the Long Beach Freeway on the east, and Eastern Avenue on the south. The Department of Transportation was instructed to install signs (with a blue background, white text, and City logo at the top) at the following locations to identify "University Hills": Valley Boulevard at Beatie Place, Valley Boulevard at Highbury Avenue, and Eastern Avenue at Medford Street.

University Hills is bordered by the Los Angeles neighborhood of El Sereno on the north and west, unincorporated City Terrace on the south, and the cities of Alhambra on the northeast and Monterey Park on the southeast.

Major thoroughfares include Eastern Avenue, Marianna Avenue, and Valley Boulevard. The San Bernardino Freeway runs along the neighborhood's southern edge.

The adjacent campus of California State University, Los Angeles occupies nearly 200 acres (0.8 km^{2}) on a hilltop site that affords views of the San Gabriel Mountains to the north, the San Gabriel Valley to the east, metropolitan Los Angeles to the west, and the Palos Verdes Peninsula and Catalina Island to the south.

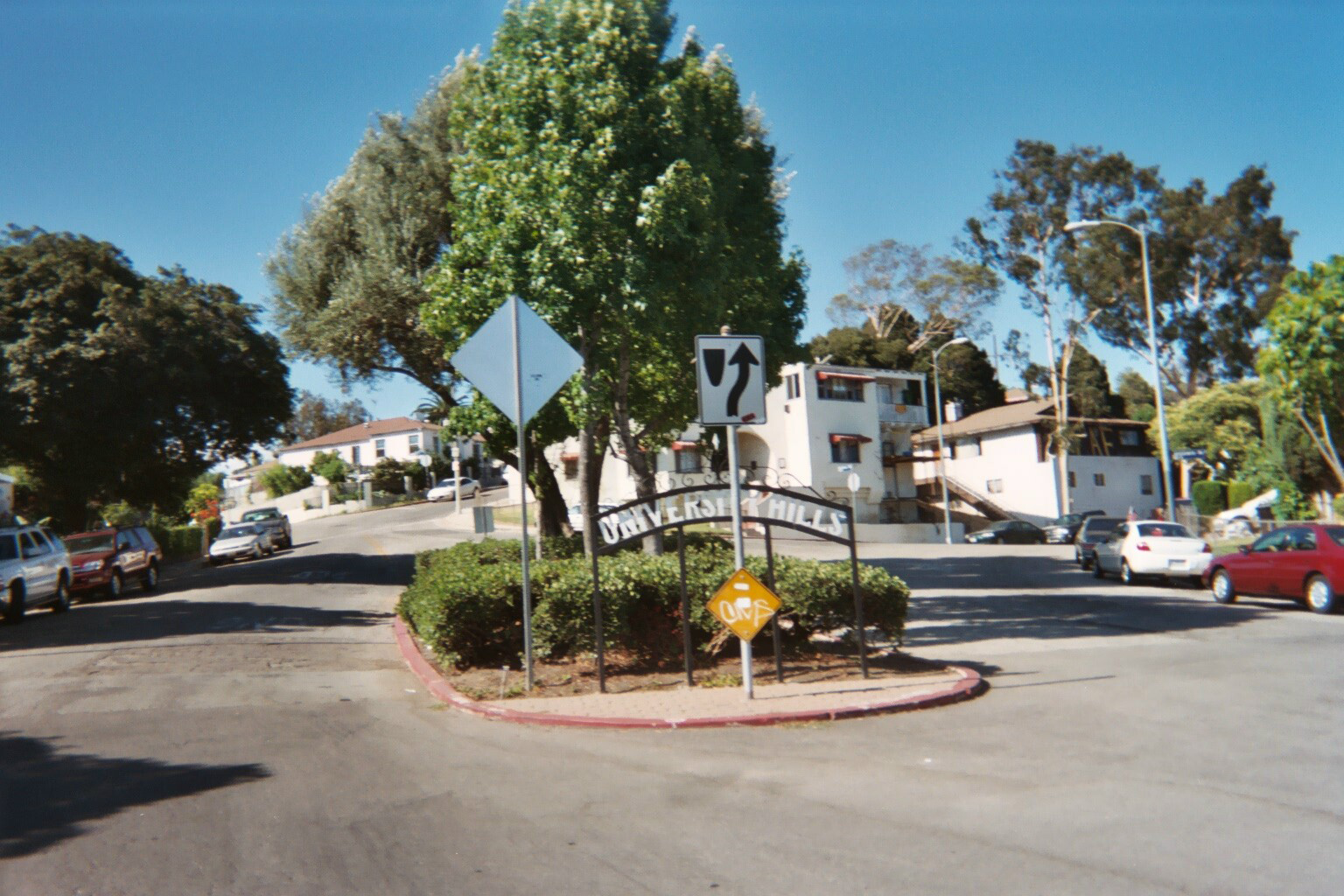
University Hills sign at Lansdowne Avenue near Eastern Avenue

== Education ==
University Hills is zoned to schools in the Los Angeles USD:

- City Terrace Elementary School
- El Sereno Middle School
- Wilson High School
