= Francisco Bravo Medical Magnet High School =

Coordinates: 34.058234°N 118.203491°W

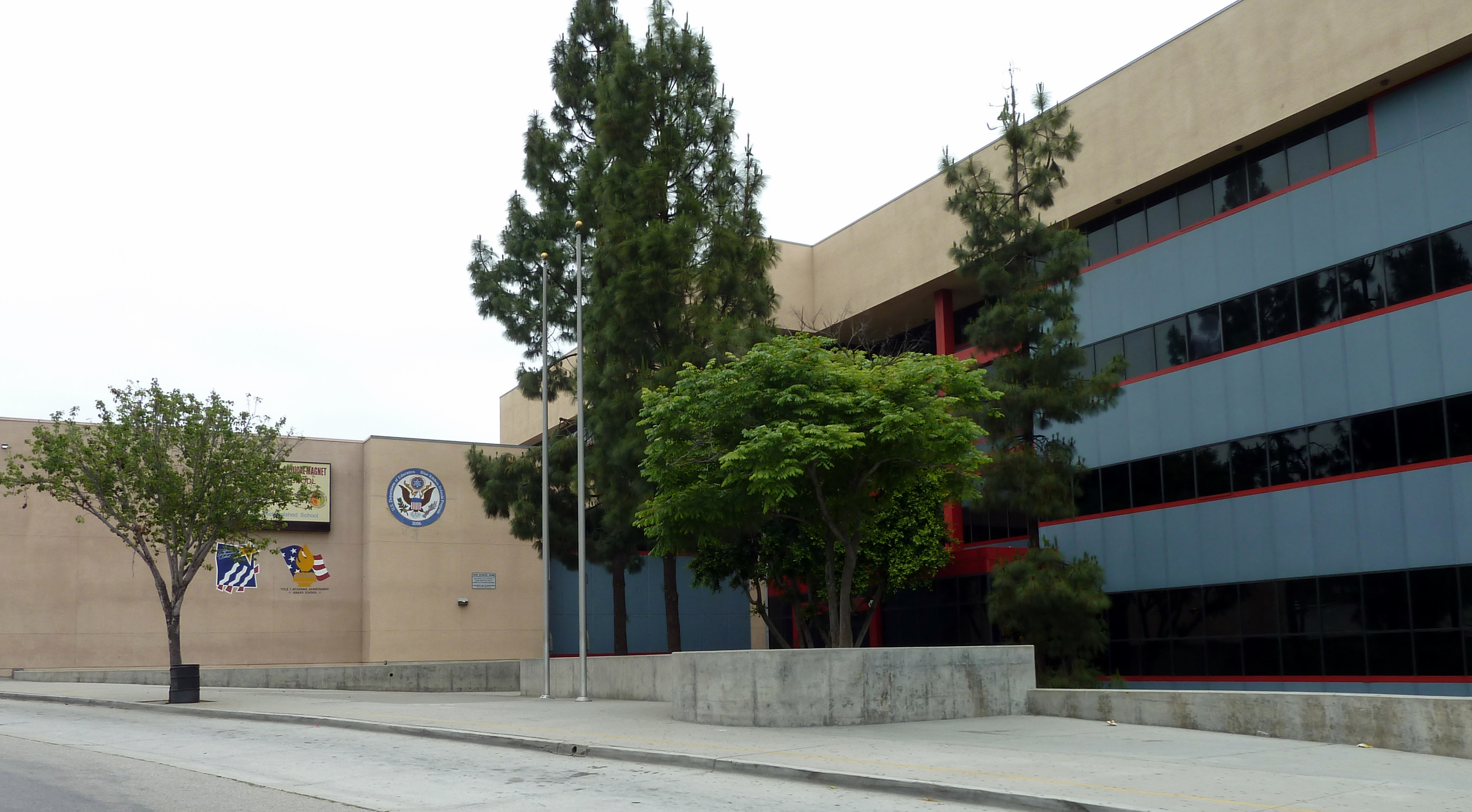
- 1200 N Cornwell St, Los Angeles, California 90033

Information
- Type: Magnet public high school
- Motto: "Quality and Integrity"
- Established: 1990
- School district: Los Angeles Unified School District
- Principal: Luis Lopez
- Faculty: 72.69 FTEs
- Grades: 9-12
- Enrollment: 1,562 (2023–2024)
- Student to teacher ratio: 21.49
- Colors: Maroon & Gray
- Athletics: Volleyball (Boys and Girls), Basketball (Boys and Girls), Soccer (Boys and Girls), Cross-Country (Boys and Girls), Track (Boys and Girls), Softball (Girls), Baseball (Boys) Golf (Girls)
- Mascot: Bravo Knights
- Website: Official website

Francisco Bravo Medical Magnet High School is a magnet public high school in the Los Angeles Unified School District with a focus on serving students who plan to study in the healthcare field. It is located near the LAC+USC Medical Center, in the Lincoln Heights neighborhood of Los Angeles, California, United States.

As of the 2014-15 school year, the school had an enrollment of 1,841 students and 70.3 classroom teachers (on an FTE basis), for a student–teacher ratio of 26.2:1. There were 1,583 students (86.0% of enrollment) eligible for free lunch and 69 (3.7% of students) eligible for reduced-cost lunch.

== Awards and recognition ==
During the 2006-2007 school year, Francisco Bravo Medical Magnet High School was recognized with the Blue Ribbon School Award of Excellence by the United States Department of Education, the highest award an American school can receive.

In their annual list of the top 1,300 high schools in the United States, Newsweek ranked Francisco Bravo Medical Magnet High School as 352nd in 2008 and 291st in 2007. In 2007, U.S. News & World Report named it one of its top 100 public high schools.

== History ==
Originally, a magnet center was established at nearby Lincoln High School before moving to Wilson High School from 1985 until 1989. Bravo Medical Magnet is named after Francisco Bravo M.D., a well-known physician who practiced in East Los Angeles, established his own clinic, and founded a scholarship fund for needy high school students interested in the health science professions. Groundbreaking on Francisco Bravo Medical Magnet High School started in 1987 and construction was completed in 1990. Dr. Rosa Maria Hernández, who was instrumental in the school's construction, served as principal from the school's opening until 2003 when she became the District F Coordinator. She was then succeeded by Maria Torres-Flores.

=== Location ===
Bravo is located in a commercial and residential section of Eastside Los Angeles, about 8 minutes from the Los Angeles Civic Center.

Bravo is located adjacent to the LAC+USC Medical Center Complex, which includes the Keck School of Medicine of USC, USC School of Pharmacy, Los Angeles County+USC Medical Center, Norris Cancer Hospital, and the USC University Hospital.

The school's proximity to USC has enabled partnerships, Bravo was adopted by the Los Angeles County+USC Medical Center in September 1981, shortly after the school opened as a small magnet center on the Lincoln High School campus. The school has agreements with USC Medical Center as well as California State University, Los Angeles (Cal State LA) in promoting health-related activities and projects.

=== Magnet Program ===
Bravo’s medical magnet program was originally part of the school integration program to be accessible to all students in the Los Angeles Unified School District, so the school community has wide geographical boundaries. Thirty buses deliver 85% of Bravo’s 1,726 students, some of whom travel up to an hour to school and are drawn from 32 middle schools. Students apply through the District’s “Choices” program and are selected by the district’s lottery.

=== Student body ===
Bravo serves around 1,847 students in grades nine through twelve, with a student-teacher ratio of 25:1. Full-time teachers 75. Approximately 40% of the students attending Bravo are from the surrounding community in what now comprises LAUSD Local District East. The remaining 60% commute from other areas of the Los Angeles Unified School District.

==== Demographics ====
Demographics of student body
Ethnic Breakdown	2021	2020	2019
Native Americans	0.3%	0.1%	0.1%
Hispanic and Latino American	82%	80%	80%
African American	1%	2%	2%
Asian American	14%	14%	13%
Native Hawaiian or other Pacific Islander	0.1%	0.1%	0.1%
White	3%	4%	5%
Multiracial Americans	0%	0.3%	0.4%
Female	62%	62%	61%
Male	38%	38%	39%

Bravo's demographics currently indicate 80% Hispanic students, 13.1% Asian/Filipino/Pacific Islander, 2% African-American, and 0.1% American Indian/Alaskan Native. Over the past six years, Bravo has maintained a steady total enrollment and has seen a general decline in all ethnic populations except the Hispanic group which has increased 15% (with a corresponding drop in other populations).

==== Title I Students ====
For 2006-07, Bravo has approximately 82% (1,415 students) of all students that are socioeconomically disadvantaged. About 72% of the students’ home language is not English. Bravo High School has a school-wide Title I program and is one of the very few Title I High Schools that have surpassed the 800 API level.

== Academics ==
=== us news 2021 Rankings ===
- 4 in Los Angeles Unified School District high Schools
- 16 in Los Angeles metropolitan area High Schools
- 44 in California High Schools
- 82 in Magnet High Schools
- 335 in National Rankings

=== us news 2020 Rankings ===
- 6 in Los Angeles Unified School District high Schools
- 17 in Los Angeles metropolitan area High Schools
- 46 in California High Schools
- 83 in Magnet High Schools
- 388 in National Rankings

=== us news 2019 Rankings ===
- 15 in Los Angeles metropolitan area High Schools
- 47 in California High Schools
- 79 in Magnet High Schools
- 382 in National Rankings

=== Academic Performance Index (API) ===
The Academic Performance Index—API for High Schools in the LAUSD District 5 and local small public charter high schools in the East Los Angeles region.

School	2007	2008	2009	2010	2011	2012	2013
Francisco Bravo Medical Magnet High School	807	818	815	820	832	842	847
Marc and Eva Stern Math and Science School	718	792	788	788	809	785	775
Oscar De La Hoya Animo Charter High School	662	726	709	710	744	744	738
James A. Garfield High School	553	597	593	632	705	710	714
Abraham Lincoln High School	594	609	588	616	643	761	738
Woodrow Wilson High School	582	585	600	615	636		
Theodore Roosevelt High School	557	551	576	608		793	788
Thomas Jefferson High School	457	516	514	546	546		
Santee Education Complex		502	521	552	565	612	636

=== Bravo API Scores ===
The Bravo Medical Magnet High School API scores:

- 2012 API: 842
- 2011 API: 832
- 2010 API: 820
- 2009 API: 815
- 2008 API: 818
- 2007 API: 807
- 2006 API: 807
- 2005 API: 819
- 2004 API: 788
- 2003 API: 766
- 2002 API: 737
- 2001 API: 733
- 2000 API: 732
- 1999 API: 715

== Notable alumni ==
- David Ryu - Former member of Los Angeles City Council, 2015-2020
- Angela Sarafyan - Actress

== See also ==
- Los Angeles Unified School District schools
- Magnet schools in California
