= Theodore Lumpkin =

Tuskegee Airman and US Air Force officer (1919–2020)

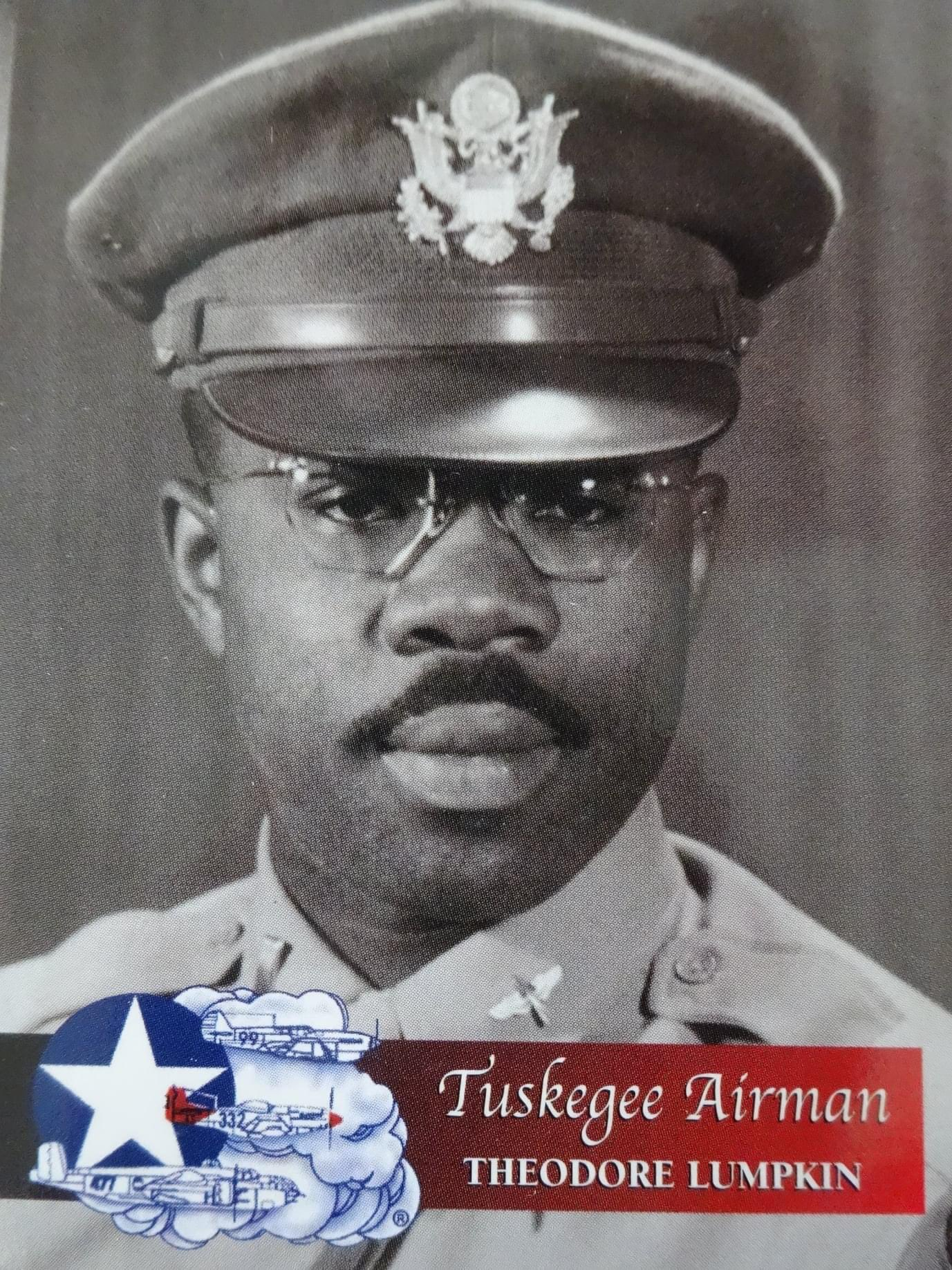
- Lt. Col. Theodore Lumpkin in 1940s
- Born: December 30, 1919; Los Angeles, California, U.S.
- Died: December 26, 2020 (aged 100); Los Angeles, California, U.S.
- Other names: Ted Lumpkin Jr.; Theodore George Lumpkin, Jr.
- Occupations: Airman, social worker, businessman
- Known for: Tuskegee airmen

Theodore Lumpkin Jr (December 30, 1919 – December 26, 2020) was an American military officer.

== Early life and education ==
Lumpkin was born in Los Angeles and was educated at Jefferson High School. He attended Los Angeles City College from 1938 to 1940, graduating with an associate degree in mathematics and continued his studies at University of California Los Angeles. The Second World War had commenced, but the USA was formally neutral until the end of 1941.

== Military career ==
Lumpkin was drafted in 1942. After basic training, he completed officer cadet school. He was made a second lieutenant and assigned to the 100th Fighter Squadron based at Tuskegee, Alabama. At the time, the US military was segregated by race and this was an all black unit. Due to his eyesight, he became an air combat intelligence officer and briefed pilots before missions. He served in Italy in 1944 where the squadron acted as escorts for bombers and was based at the Ramitelli Air Base as part of the 332nd Fighter Group. Lumpkin left active service in January 1946 with the rank of captain.

After the end of the war he became a member of the Air Force Reserves and finally retired in 1979 with the rank of lieutenant colonel. He was active in the post-war military association of the Tuskegee Airmen Inc. as a national board member and also was president of the Los Angeles chapter. Lumpkin was a board member of the Tuskegee Airmen Scholarship Foundation.

Lumpkin was one of the surviving Tuskegee airmen who attended by invitation the inauguration of US President Obama in 2009.

== Later life ==
After the war, he graduated in sociology from the University of Southern California. He also met and married Georgia. He began working as a social worker in 1947 and in 1953 took a master's degree in social work at University of Southern California. He later had his own real estate agency and continued to work in it when over 100.

Lumpkin died from complications caused by COVID-19 on December 26, 2020, at the age of 100, four days before his 101st birthday.
