= Santee Education Complex =

Location
- 1921 South Maple Avenue; Los Angeles, California; United States; 34.02926°N 118.26327°W

Information
- Type: Public
- Founded: 2005
- School board: Los Angeles Unified School District
- School district: Los Angeles Unified School District 5
- CEEB code: 053974
- Principal: Violeta Ruiz
- Staff: 86.13 (FTE)
- Grades: 9-12
- Age range: 14-18
- Average class size: 35 students
- Colours: Black and Gold
- Team name: Falcons
- Rival: West Adams Preparatory High School
- Website: santeefalcons.org/index.jsp?rn=6233192

Santee Education Complex is a secondary school located at 1921 South Maple Avenue in Los Angeles, California. Santee, which serves grades nine through twelve, is a part of the Los Angeles Unified School District and is located in the South Los Angeles area.

== History ==
The campus opened on July 5, 2005, with a three-track, year-round calendar to provide immediate relief for overcrowding at nearby Jefferson High School. It was the first new four-year high school to open in LAUSD in over 35 years. Funding came from a school construction bond issue passed by Los Angeles voters in 2000. Santee was initially under the auspices of Local District 5. Beginning with the 2008/2009 school year, Santee teachers and administrators voted to join the Partnership for Los Angeles Schools, a newly formed organization dedicated to bringing the best instructional and operational practices into the classrooms of inner-city schools.

Since its opening, Santee has enjoyed a steady improvement in its API, CAHSEE scores and graduation rates. Santee's academic progress was also confirmed by the Western Association of Schools and Colleges (WASC) when it awarded the school a three-year accreditation beginning with the 2010–2011 school year.

On June 24, 2011, Santee held its sixth graduation ceremony, featuring a commencement address by Mayor Antonio Villaraigosa.

== Academics ==
School	2007	2008	2009	2010	2011	2012	2013
Francisco Bravo Medical Magnet High School	807	818	815	820	832	842	847
Marc and Eva Stern Math and Science School	718	792	788	788	809	785	775
Oscar De La Hoya Animo Charter High School	662	726	709	710	744	744	738
James A. Garfield High School	553	597	593	632	705	710	714
Abraham Lincoln High School	594	609	588	616	643	761	738
Woodrow Wilson High School	582	585	600	615	636		
Theodore Roosevelt High School	557	551	576	608		793	788
Thomas Jefferson High School	457	516	514	546	546		
Santee Education Complex		502	521	552	565	612	636

== Athletics ==
Santee has developed a highly successful athletic program that includes league championships in both basketball and track. During the 2009/2010 season, the boys basketball team was undefeated in Southern League play: 13-0. The cross country and track team has consistently dominated meets for the last ten years. In the 2011 Los Angeles City Track Finals, Santee Falcons placed first in the boys 1600m and 3200m races. Falcon girls placed first and second in the 3200m race

== Santee Theatre ==
The Santee Theatre is a 915-seat indoor theater used for cinemas, musical events, assemblies, and other performing arts events. It has two levels, the floor level and loge level.
