= Otsungna =

Former Tongva village located in present-day El Sereno

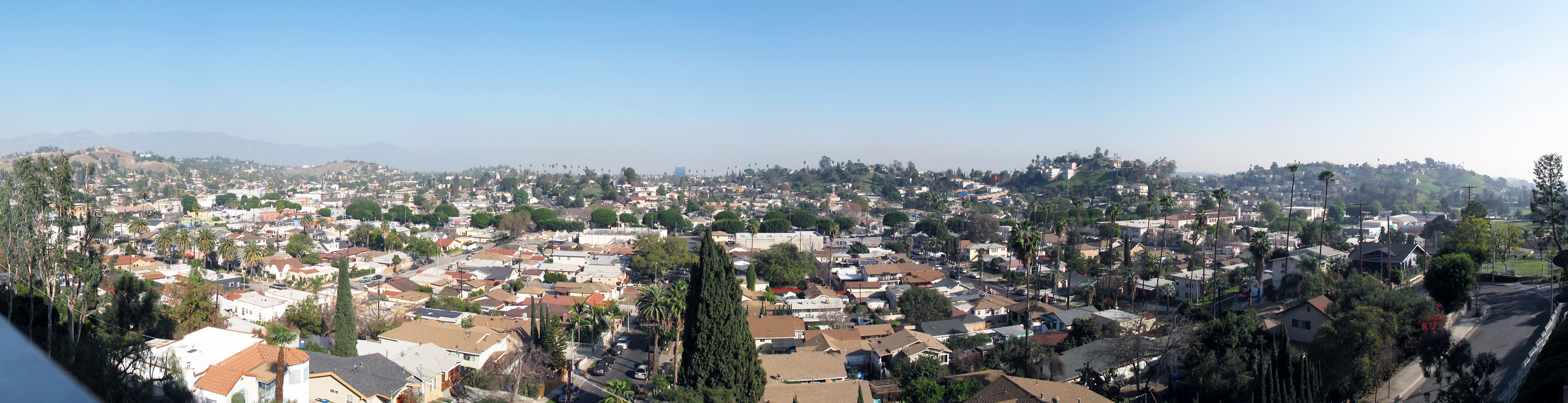
The site of Otsungna is located near the neighborhood of El Sereno, Los Angeles (pictured).

Otsungna was a local Native Tongva village located in what is now the El Sereno neighborhood of Los Angeles, California and California State University, Los Angeles. It was referenced as the "Otsungna Prehistoric Village Site" in the construction of State Route 710. The village has alternatively been referred to as Otsonna / Otsnga / Ochuunga / Otsu'nga in historical records.

== History ==
The village was located north and west of the large village of Yaanga connected via a trail with the other village of Shevaanga. Spanish priest José Zalvidea noted that the village was located "on the road from San Gabriel to Los Angeles." This was a pre-Columbian trail that was used extensively prior to the arrival of the Spanish colonizers.

Although evidence of the village has been largely destroyed, it has been proposed that El Sereno was established adjacent to Otsungna as an early Spanish colonial settlement in the Los Angeles area since Native laborers were essential to the construction of the city and early settlements were often constructed near preexisting Native villages.
