= Jefferson High School (Los Angeles) =

Public secondary school in Los Angeles, California, United States

Thomas Jefferson High School
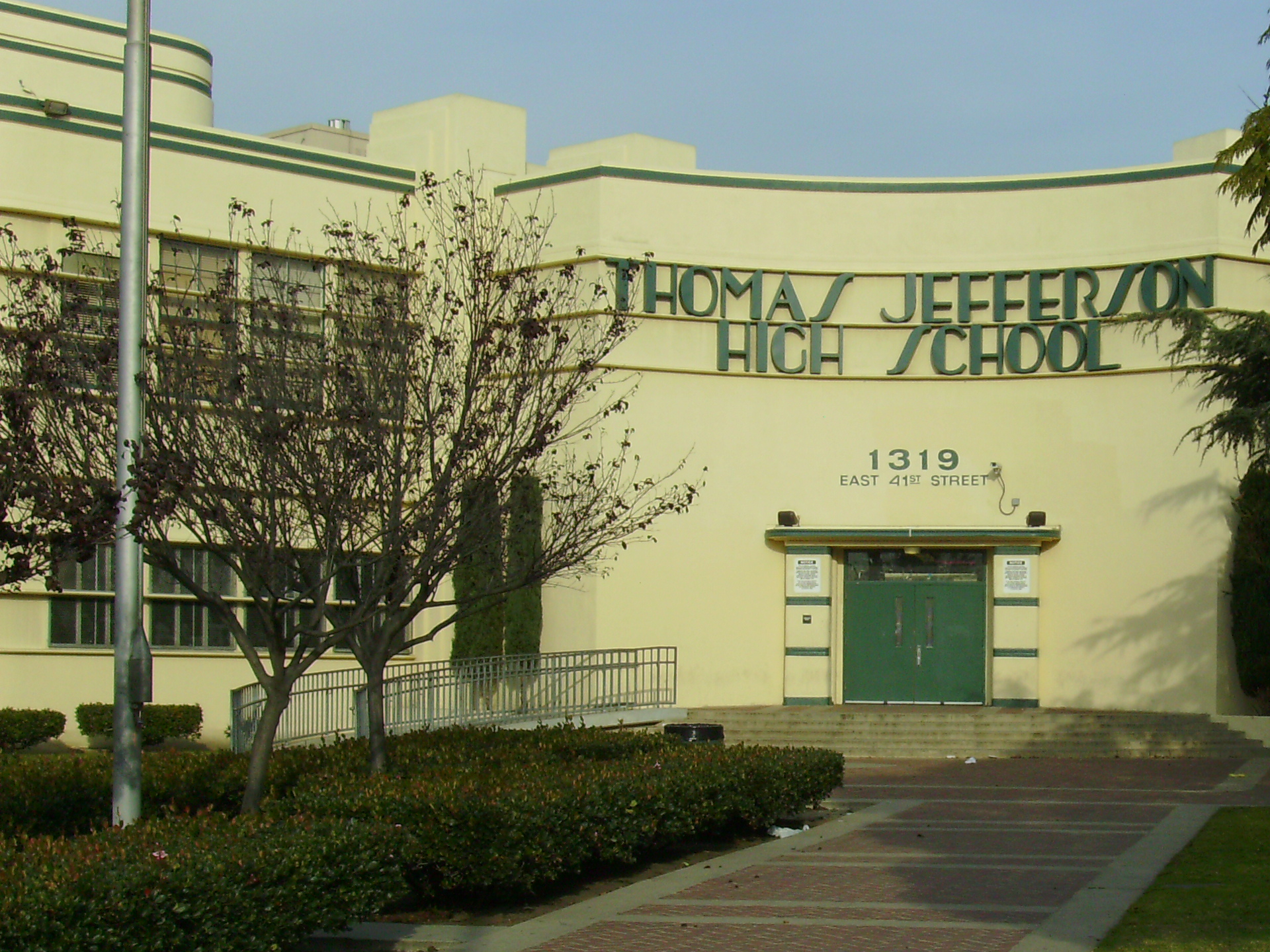

Location
- 1319 East 41st Street; Los Angeles, California 90011; 34.00958°N 118.25093°W

Information
- Type: Public
- Established: 1916
- Locale: City, Large
- School district: Los Angeles Unified School District
- NCES District ID: 0622710
- CEEB code: 051815
- NCES School ID: 062271003106
- Principal: Agustin Gonzalez
- Teaching staff: 35.84 (on an FTE basis)
- Grades: 9–12
- Enrollment: 564 (2024–25)
  - Male: 291
  - Female: 273
- Student to teacher ratio: 16.74
- Colors: Green and gold
- Athletics conference: Exposition League; CIF Los Angeles City Section
- Nickname: Democrats (Demos)
- Rival: John C. Fremont High School
- Yearbook: The Democrat
- Website: jeffersonhs.lausd.org

Thomas Jefferson High School, usually referred to as Jefferson High School, is a public high school in South Los Angeles, California, United States. Founded in 1916, it is the fourth oldest high school in the school district, and has historically been a center for Black American education in Los Angeles. Jefferson's school colors are kelly green and gold. The sports teams are called the Democrats, or Demos for short.

In 2006, a pilot program called New Tech: Student Empowerment Academy began in the northeast portion of the school. New Tech has since become a separate charter school housed in the Jefferson building. In 2016 New Tech closed down and its space is now used by Nava College Preparatory Academy, a school that was established in 2014.

== History ==
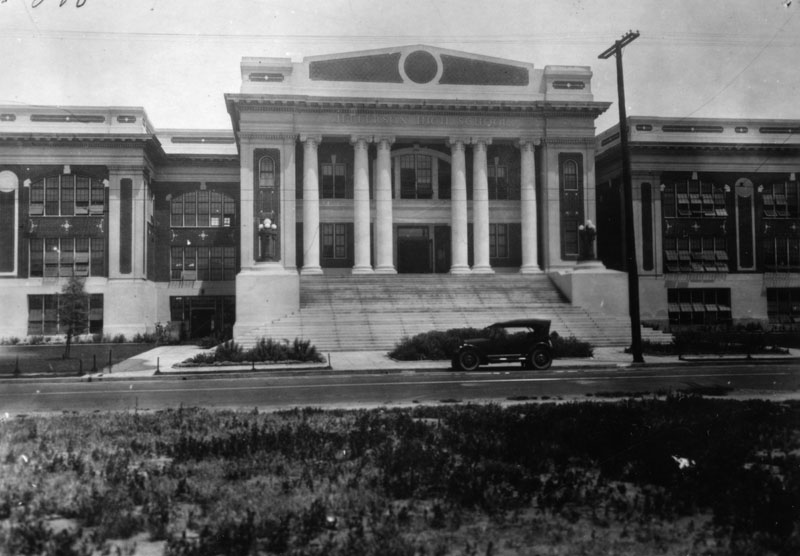
Jefferson High original school from the front, 1920

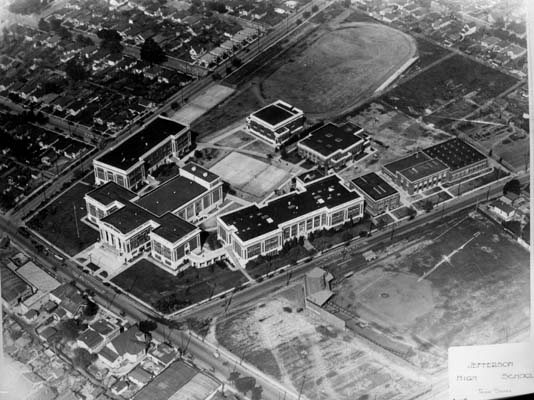
Jefferson High original school aerial view, 1920

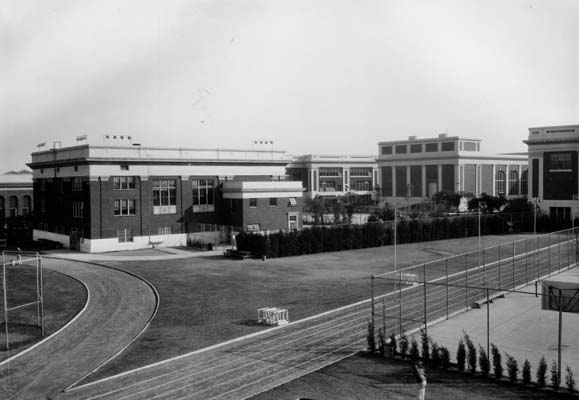
Jefferson High original school from the rear, 1920

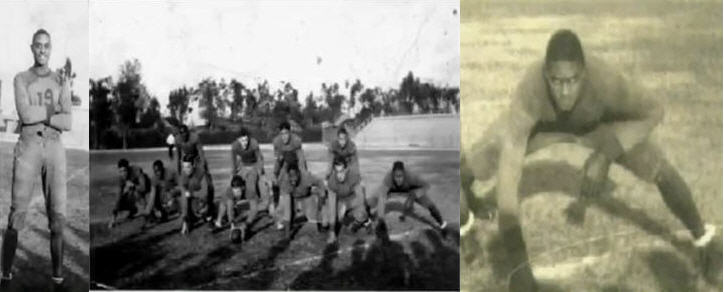
Woody Strode playing left end for the Jefferson High Democrats in 1936

In 1915, the citizens of Los Angeles voted to sell bonds to raise $4,600,000 to build schools in the area. Approximately $500,000 was appropriated to build Jefferson High School on the "Stadium East Grounds" (the Old Coliseum) (Note: The Old Coliseum precedes the Los Angeles Coliseum built in 1929 that hosted two Olympics. It was the main amphitheater in Los Angeles in the late 1800s.) which held approximately 25,000 people in a circled amphitheater configuration. The "Stadium," as it was known, was the site for hosting and entertaining travelers on the way to both the San Diego and San Francisco world expos in 1915. Numerous rodeos and bicycle races were held at the location.

Architect Norman F. Marsh was hired to design the new Jefferson High School complex. The property fronted 1235 feet on Hooper Avenue, 1149 feet on Compton Avenue, 952 feet on 34th Street, and 392 feet on 38th Street. The buildings of the group would be of brick and concrete construction, being faced with rug tapestry brick and trimmed with artificial stone. All corridors and stairways would be made absolutely fireproof. The classical style would be followed, each of the main structures having a dignified entrance portico with stone pediment and columns.

Jefferson opened its doors on September 11, 1916, with 24 faculty members and two buildings completed. Theodore Fulton was installed as the school's first principal. He and his wife died in a December 1930 car crash. Their daughter Ruth survived. They had three other daughters.

On March 10, 1933, a magnitude 6.4 earthquake in the city of Long Beach completely destroyed the infrastructure of the six buildings which composed the Jefferson High School Campus. The campus was closed from March 10 until April 6 while the school board assessed the situation. On April 6, tent bungalows provided by the school board were erected on the football fields. Classes were shortened to half day sessions in order to serve the entire student population.

=== Reconstruction ===
In 1933, Architect Stiles O. Clements was hired to build a 45-unit campus with a budget of $353,000. The "Streamline Modern" building structures were completed in 1935. Ross Dickinson was selected and funded by Federal Art Project to paint four 11 feet by 5.5 foot murals with the theme "The History of Recorded Word". The murals were completed in 1937.

As of 1936, several notable alumni such as Ralph Bunche, Woody Strode and Samuel R. Browne had graduated from Jefferson High School. All three men were Black American, the first of many Jefferson alumni to break racial barriers in politics, dance, music, and sports. Jefferson produced more jazz musicians and composers than any other high school west of the Mississippi. Many of the musicians were nurtured under the guidance of Samuel R. Browne.

=== Post-reconstruction ===
The school was in the Los Angeles City High School District until 1961, when it merged into LAUSD.

== Athletics ==
In 1937, Jefferson won the first of eight California State Championships in track and field (1937, 1949, 1950, 1951, 1952, 1956, 1962, and 1964). The four consecutive state championships in California (1949, 1950, 1951 and 1952) have not been surpassed today. Woody Strode is one of two men who broke the color barrier in the National Football League in 1946. Mal Whitfield and Charles Dumas both received gold medals in the Olympics. This is a rare instance when two Olympic gold medalists have come from the same high school.

== Music ==
Jefferson High has produced more prominent jazz musicians and composers than any other public or private high school in California. The school's music classes greatly impacted the participation of teenagers and young musicians in the Central Avenue jazz scene, its curriculum offering courses in music theory, music appreciation, harmony, counterpoint, orchestra, band, and choir. The hiring of influential teacher Samuel Browne in 1936 marked the beginning of a shift toward an integrated faculty in LA County public secondary schools and a pedagogical approach that emphasized mentorship, encouragement, and involvement with students and their families.

== Academic configuration ==
Jefferson is a traditional calendar school, composed of four Small Learning Communities (SLCs) and the Early College program, which is located at L.A. Trade Tech. The goal of each SLC is to offer individualized attention to students. The SLCs are as follows:

- Academy of Business & Communication (ABC): focuses on building leaders in the liberal arts, retail, medical, legal and business fields.
- Creative Arts and Expression (CAE): focuses on the creative energy and leadership within each student through the arts.
- Global Outlook through Academic Leadership: focuses on building leaders in the social, political, environmental, health and economic fields
- TPA Small Learning Community: focuses on building leaders in the education and social services fields

The Early College Program (Jefferson/Trade Tech. Incentive) accepts students, based on recommendation and interview, who have "extenuating circumstances" requiring special support to achieve college acceptance.

== Notable alumni ==
=== Dancers and choreographers ===
- Alvin Ailey – choreographer and activist; founded the Alvin Ailey American Dance Theater in New York City
- Carmen De Lavallade – dancer and actor

=== Television and film actors ===
- Matthew Beard Jr. – Black American actor, best known as Stymie in Our Gang (The Little Rascals) shorts
- Roland Got – Chinese-American actor, best known for The Good Earth (1937)
- Suzette Harbin – Black American actress and dancer in films
- Theresa Harris – Black American character actress and singer; notable early films include Hold Your Man (1932), Baby Face, and Professional Sweetheart (1933)
- Juanita Moore – actress, fourth Black American nominated for an Oscar; participated in over 50 movies; best known for her role as the mother in Imitation of Life
- Woody Strode – Black American actor and football player, acted in films including The Ten Commandments, Spartacus, and Posse

=== Television and film production and design ===
- John Meehan – art director and production designer
- Iwao Takamoto – animator and character designer for Walt Disney Productions and Hanna-Barbera

=== Politicians and judges ===
- Ralph Bunche – educator, UN mediator on Palestine, Nobel Peace Prize winner
- Mablean Ephriam – prosecuting attorney on television series Divorce Court and Justice with Judge Mablean
- Earl C. Gay – Los Angeles City Council member, 1933–45
- Augustus F. Hawkins – U.S. House of Representatives from California's 21st and 29th district from 1963 to 1991; California assembly from 1935 to 1963
- Thelton Henderson – federal judge in the Northern District of California
- Willard H. Murray, Jr. – California State Assembly member 1988–1996 (District 52); California Institute for the Preservation of Jazz; current director of the Water Replenishment District 1; father of former state senator Kevin Murray
- David W. Williams – judge for the United States District Court for the Central District of California; first Black American federal judge from states west of the Mississippi

=== Journalists ===
- Stanley Crouch – syndicated columnist and novelist best known for his jazz criticism and 2004 novel Don't the Moon Look Lonesome?

=== Composers, songwriters, and music directors ===
- Roy Ayers – funk, soul, and jazz composer, vibraphone player, and record producer; nicknamed the "godfather of neo soul"
- Jesse Belvin – songwriter, singer; co-wrote "Goodnight My Love", used to end the Alan Freed show; co-writer of "Earth Angel", made popular by The Penguins
- Richard Berry – singer-songwriter, original performer of the rock standard "Louie Louie"
- Leroy Hurte – singer, music conductor, composer, educator, author, businessman, and record producer
- Rickey Minor – Emmy-nominated music director, composer, and music producer for shows including The Tonight Show with Jay Leno, American Idol and Don't Forget The Lyrics!
- Horace Tapscott – jazz piano player and composer; subject of UCLA Jazz Archive called the Horace Tapscott Collection; creator of the Pan Afrikan Peoples Arkestra (P.A.P.A.)
- Johnny "Guitar" Watson – blues and funk singer-songwriter and guitarist
- Barry White – record producer, singer-songwriter; five-time Grammy Award winner; attended Jefferson for sophomore and junior year
- Young Jessie – R&B and jazz singer-songwriter

=== Instrumental musicians ===
- Don Cherry – jazz trumpet player
- Sonny Criss – jazz saxophone player transferred from Jordan High School to Jefferson
- Bill Douglass – jazz drummer
- Addison Farmer – jazz bassist
- Art Farmer – jazz trumpet player
- Dexter Gordon – jazz saxophonist known for his music and starring role in the movie Round Midnight;
- Chico Hamilton – jazz drummer
- Jackie Kelson – jazz saxophone player
- Melba Liston – jazz trombone player; attended Jefferson, but later transferred to Polytechnic High School
- Big Jay McNeely – jazz saxophone player; transferred from Jordan to Jefferson
- Jack McVea – jazz and Dixieland saxophone player
- Frank Morgan – jazz saxophone player
- Vi Redd – jazz saxophone player
- Ernie Royal – jazz trumpet player
- Marshal Royal – jazz saxophone player
- Ginger Smock – concert and jazz violinist
- Ed Thigpen – jazz drummer
- Lammar Wright, Jr. – jazz trumpet player
- Lee Young – jazz drummer

=== Singers ===
- Ivie Anderson – jazz singer, performed with Duke Ellington's orchestra between 1931 and 1942
- Ernie Andrews – jazz and blues singer
- Richard Berry – singer, songwriter, and musician; known for writing "Louie Louie," performed with numerous Los Angeles doo-wop groups including The Flairs
- Ray Brewster – member of the groups The Hollywood Flames, The Cadillacs, The Penguins and The Platters
- Merry Clayton – solo musician and backup singer for many artists, including Mick Jagger
- Cornell Gunter – R&B singer and member of The Platters and The Coasters; transferred to Manual Arts his senior year
- Jennell Hawkins – R&B and jazz singer
- Alex Hodge – member of musical group The Platters
- Gaynel Hodge – member of musical group The Platters
- Etta James – blues singer famous for hit song "At Last"
- Johnnie Martin – member of the gospel group Mighty Clouds of Joy
- O.C. Smith – jazz singer and minister who performed with Count Basie Orchestra; recorded the first version of the song "That's Life" made famous by Frank Sinatra; had numerous hit songs in his long career
- Bruce Tate – member of doo-wop group The Penguins
- Mel Walker – lead singer with the Johnny Otis Orchestra
- Curtis Williams – member of doo-wop group The Penguins

=== Military ===
- Theodore Lumpkin Jr. (1919–2020) – Tuskegee Airman, social worker and businessman

=== Visual artists ===
- Kerry James Marshall – artist

=== Sports ===
- Emmett Ashford – first African-American umpire in major league baseball
- Andy Bakjian – National Track and Field Hall of Fame official; longtime coach at Jefferson
- Don Bishop – football player for the Dallas Cowboys, Pittsburgh Steelers, and Chicago Bears
- Otis Burrell – 5-time National Champion in the high jump, 1966 NCAA Champion at University of Nevada, Reno, Pan American Games silver medalist
- Milt Davis – football player for the Baltimore Colts from 1957 to 1961, including winning the 1958 NFL Championship game
- Romeo Doubs – football player for the Green Bay Packers and New England Patriots
- Charles Dumas – Olympic high jumper and the first person to clear seven feet; attended Jefferson in his sophomore and Junior years; transferred to Centennial High School in Compton
- Joe Kelly – football player for the Cincinnati Bengals
- Edgar Lacy – UCLA basketball player
- Lee Maye – Major League Baseball player
- Glenn McDonald – basketball player for the Boston Celtics
- Bill McGill – NBA basketball player
- Bernard Quarles – NFL and CFL football player
- Woody Strode – NFL and CFL football player and decathlete who went on to become an actor
- Mal Whitfield – middle-distance runner and Olympic gold medalist

== Academic Performance Index (API) ==
API for high schools in the LAUSD District 5 and local small public charter high schools in the East Los Angeles region:

School	2007	2008	2009	2010	2011	2012	2013
Francisco Bravo Medical Magnet High School	807	818	815	820	832	842	847
Marc and Eva Stern Math and Science School	718	792	788	788	809	785	775
Oscar De La Hoya Animo Charter High School	662	726	709	710	744	744	738
James A. Garfield High School	553	597	593	632	705	710	714
Abraham Lincoln High School	594	609	588	616	643	761	738
Woodrow Wilson High School	582	585	600	615	636		
Theodore Roosevelt High School	557	551	576	608		793	788
Thomas Jefferson High School	457	516	514	546	546		
Santee Education Complex		502	521	552	565	612	636

== See also ==
- "Sisters at Heart", a 1970 episode of the TV series Bewitched that was written by students at Jefferson High School after they visited the set of that show and interacted with the cast and writers.
