= Dr. Olga Mohan High School =

High school in California, United States

Coordinates: 34.03686°N 118.27211°W

Information
- School type: Charter high school
- Established: August 2006; 20 years ago
- Grades: 9-12
- Enrollment: 455 (2023-2024)
- Website: www.mohanhs.org

Dr. Olga Mohan High School (DOMHS), formerly known as College Ready Academy High School # 4, is an independent non-profit start-up charter high school that is located on 644 W 17th St, Los Angeles, California, United States.

Dr. Olga Mohan High School, which serves grades 9 through 12, is part of the Alliance College-Ready Public Schools. The Charter school was founded in August 2006.

== Awards ==
Over the years DOMHS has received the following awards:

- 2015 U.S. News & World Report Rankings: #74 in Los Angeles, #58 in California, #311 in the United States
- 2013 U.S. News & World Report Rankings: #1 in Los Angeles, #14 in California, #95 in the United States
- 2013 California Distinguished School
- 2011 Charter School of the Year Hart Vision Award by the California Charter School Association
- 2010 California Distinguished School
- 2009-10 EPIC Gold Gain Award
- 2009-10 Title I Achievement Award
- 2008-09 EPIC Silver Gain Award
- 2008-2009 Title 1 Achievement Award
