= Rancho Rosa Castilla =

- Historic Ranch Land
- Interactive map of Rancho Rosa Castilla
- Coordinates: 34.090°N 118.200°W
- Established: 1831
- Founder: Juan Ballesteros

Area
  - Total: 13.26 km^{2} (5.12 sq mi)

Rancho Rosa Castilla was a 3,283-acre (13.29 km^{2}) Mexican land grant in the southwestern Repetto Hills, in present day Los Angeles County, California, given to Juan Ballesteros in 1831 by Governor Manuel Victoria.

It included present day Rose Hills, Lincoln Heights, City Terrace, El Sereno and portions of South Pasadena, Alhambra, and Monterey Park. After California statehood, the land grant failed to receive confirmation from the U.S. Public Land Commission.

== History ==
"Rancho Rosa de Castilla" was named for the abundant amount of native Wood roses (Rosa californica) along the creek. The Kizh Indians named this area, Ochuunga (Place of Roses). When Spanish Franciscans founded the San Gabriel Mission in 1771, they dubbed the small river El Rio Rosa de Castillo. In 1831, the land was granted to prominent Californio Juan Ballesteros, the Register of the Pueblo of Los Angeles from 1823 to 1824. The rancho was christened Rancho Rosa de Castilla.

With the cession of California to the United States following the Mexican–American War, the 1848 Treaty of Guadalupe Hidalgo provided that the land grants would be honored. As required by the Land Act of 1851, a claim for Rancho Rosa Castilla was filed with the Public Land Commission by Anacleto Lestrade, a priest at the San Gabriel Mission in 1852, but the Rosa de Castilla grant failed to receive confirmation from the Land Commission. The Board of Land Commissioners rejected the claim because: (a.) of unclear boundaries; and (b.) that the original grantee, Juan Ballesteros, had not occupied the land continuously as required.

In 1852, the title passed to Jean-Baptiste Batz and his wife, Catalina. A Basque emigre, Batz used the land for farming and intensive sheep ranching. In 1882, after both Jean-Baptiste and Catalina died, the land was divided among six of their children.

The street Paseo Rancho Castilla, which runs around California State University, Los Angeles, is named after Rancho Rosa Castilla.

== See also ==
- List of California native plants
- Ranchos of Los Angeles County, California
