= Alliance Margaret M. Bloomfield High School =

Charter school in Huntington Park, California

Coordinates: 33.9668°N 118.2304°W

Alliance Margaret M. Bloomfield High School, located in Huntington Park, California, is a charter school that is part of the Alliance College-Ready Public Schools network in Los Angeles. It operates as a free public charter school authorized by the Los Angeles Unified School District.

The school has an enrollment of approximately 574 students, with a student-teacher ratio of 23 to 1. State test scores indicate that 37% of its students are proficient in math and 77% in reading. The school reports a graduation rate of 95%.

In terms of resources and programs, the school offers various services, including the presence of psychologists and social workers, college and academic counselors, and opportunities for college dual enrollment. The school also provides a Summer Bridge program for incoming 9th-grade students and a uniform policy that includes one free shirt and sweater for each student.

Alliance Margaret M. Bloomfield High School is recognized as a California Distinguished School by the California Department of Education. This recognition is given to schools that demonstrate significant academic growth and performance, as well as a positive school culture.
