= El Sereno, Los Angeles =

El Sereno
- Neighborhood of Los Angeles
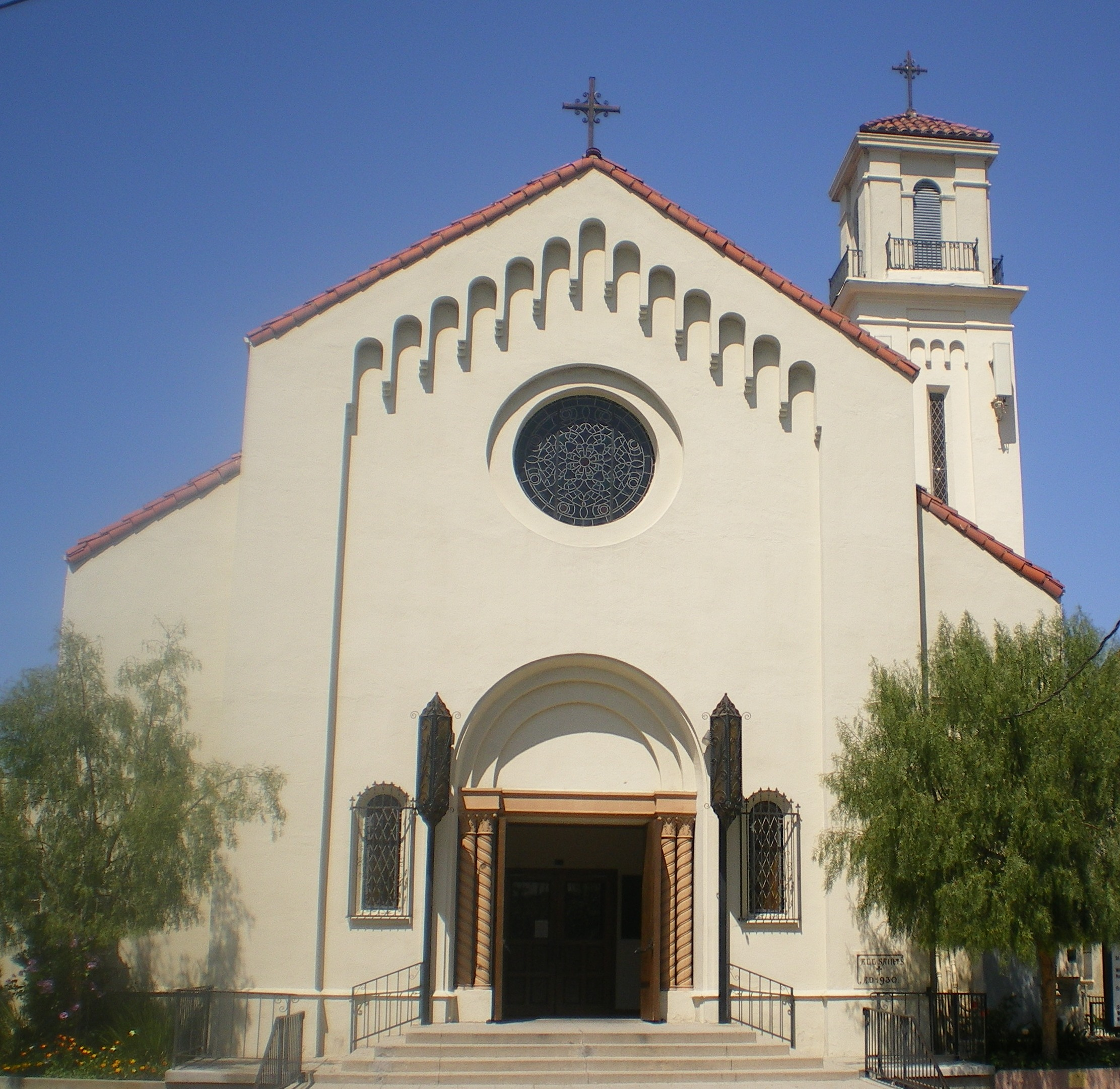
- All Saints Catholic Church

- Location within Central Los Angeles El Sereno (the Los Angeles metropolitan area) El Sereno (California) El Sereno (the United States)
- Coordinates: 34.08111°N 118.17694°W
- Country: United States
- State: California
- County: Los Angeles
- City: Los Angeles

Government
  - City Council: Ysabel Jurado
  - State Assembly: Jessica Caloza (D)
  - State Senate: Maria Elena Durazo (D)
  - U.S. House: Jimmy Gomez (D)

Area
  - Total: 4.1 sq mi (11 km^{2})

Population (2000)
  - Total: 43,766
  - Density: 9,826/sq mi (3,794/km^{2})
- Time zone: UTC-8 (PST)
  - Summer (DST): UTC-7 (PDT)
- ZIP code: 90032, 90063
- Area code: 323
- Website: El Sereno Historical Society

El Sereno (Spanish, "The Serene One") is a neighborhood in the Eastside of Los Angeles, California, United States, located east of the Los Angeles River.

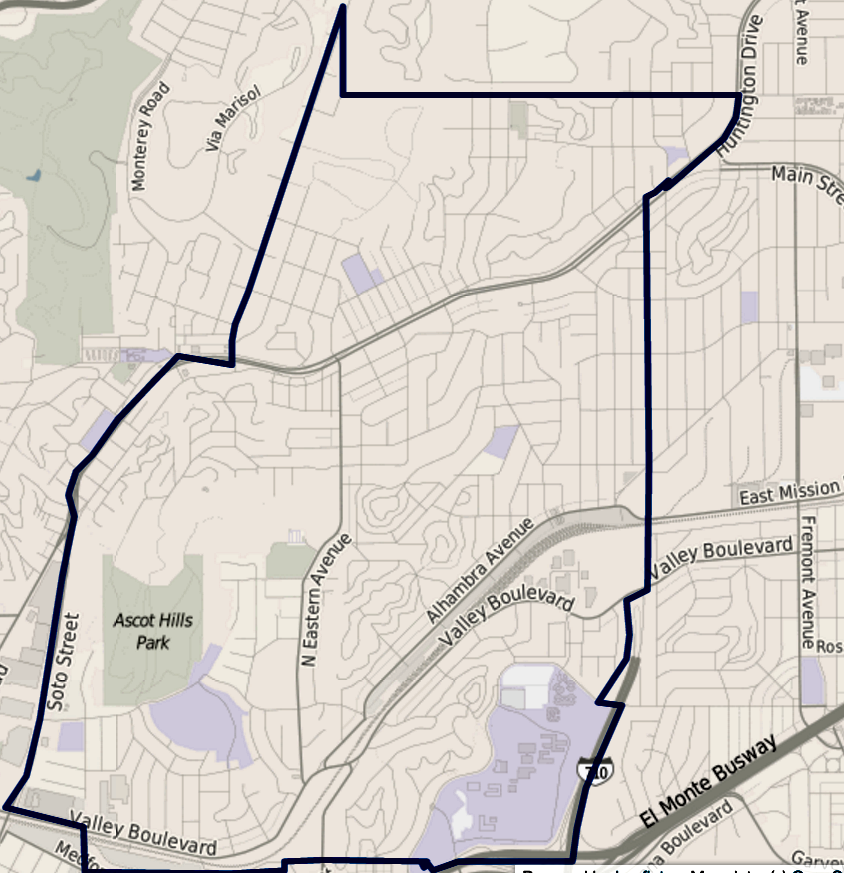
El Sereno as mapped by the Los Angeles Times. California State University, Los Angeles is in the lower right corner.

== History ==
=== Tongva ===
The Tongva village of Otsungna was situated in today's El Sereno on the banks of a stream that was later named Arroyo Rosa de Castilla, which ran east of present-day Guardia and Farnsworth avenues. A trail connected Otsungna to the village of Yangna on the Los Angeles River, then on to the village of Sibagna, near the eventual site of the Mission San Gabriel. The route later became Mission Road.

=== Spanish Period (1769—1821) ===
The El Sereno area was first visited by Europeans in 1769, when the Spanish overland Portola Expedition passed just south of present-day El Sereno. In 1771, Mission San Gabriel Arcángel was founded, including the area that became El Sereno area of its lands was used for cattle grazing, and an adobe was constructed there in 1776.

In 1784, three years after the pueblo was founded, Spanish Governor Pedro Fages granted all the lands between the Los Angeles River and the Arroyo Seco to Jose Maria Verdugo. The Rancho San Rafael as it was known, covered approximately 36,000 acres (14,569 ha). The El Sereno area was not included in either the pueblo or Rancho San Rafael. El Sereno was later part of the Mexican Rancho Rosa Castilla land grant. Around 1810, a New Spain government's adobe toll house was built next to the road from the Mission to the Pueblo (present day Valley Boulevard/Alhambra Avenue), near present-day Warwick Avenue and Martin Street, just north of Alhambra Avenue.

=== Mexican rancho period (1831 to 1847) ===
After Mexican independence from Spain (1821), the Rancho Rosa de Castilla – named after a stream that ran through the area – was granted to Juan Ballesteros in 1831. This stream was called the Arroyo Rosa de Castilla because of the roses growing on its banks. It included what is now El Sereno. Lincoln Heights and City Terrace, as well as parts of South Pasadena, Alhambra and Monterey Park. After the secularization of the missions in 1833, the ranch passed to Francisco (Chico) Lopez.

=== American ranch period (1848 to 1901) ===
==== Ownership ====
Rancho Rosa de Castilla was acquired around 1850 by Anaclet Lestrade, a priest of Our Lady of the Angels Church on the Los Angeles Plaza. In 1852, Jean-Baptiste (Juan Bautista) Batz and his wife, Catalina Hegui Batz, acquired the adobe ranch house from Lestrade. Batz engaged in farming and sheep ranching until his death on December 6, 1859. Under the Homestead Act, his widow received title to the 160 acres (65 ha) upon which the adobe stood in 1876. She purchased land from surrounding owners, and the ranch eventually grew to 3,283 acres (1,329 ha). It included the later communities of Ramona Acres (City of Alhambra), Sierra Vista (El Sereno), Sierra Park (El Sereno), West Alhambra (Alhambra and El Sereno) and Bairdstown (El Sereno) west to El Sereno Avenue (now Eastern Avenue). After Catalina died on February 22, 1882, the land portion of the estate was then divided between six of her eight children. The southernmost 700 acres (283 ha) passed to the third-oldest son, Jose Domingo Batz.

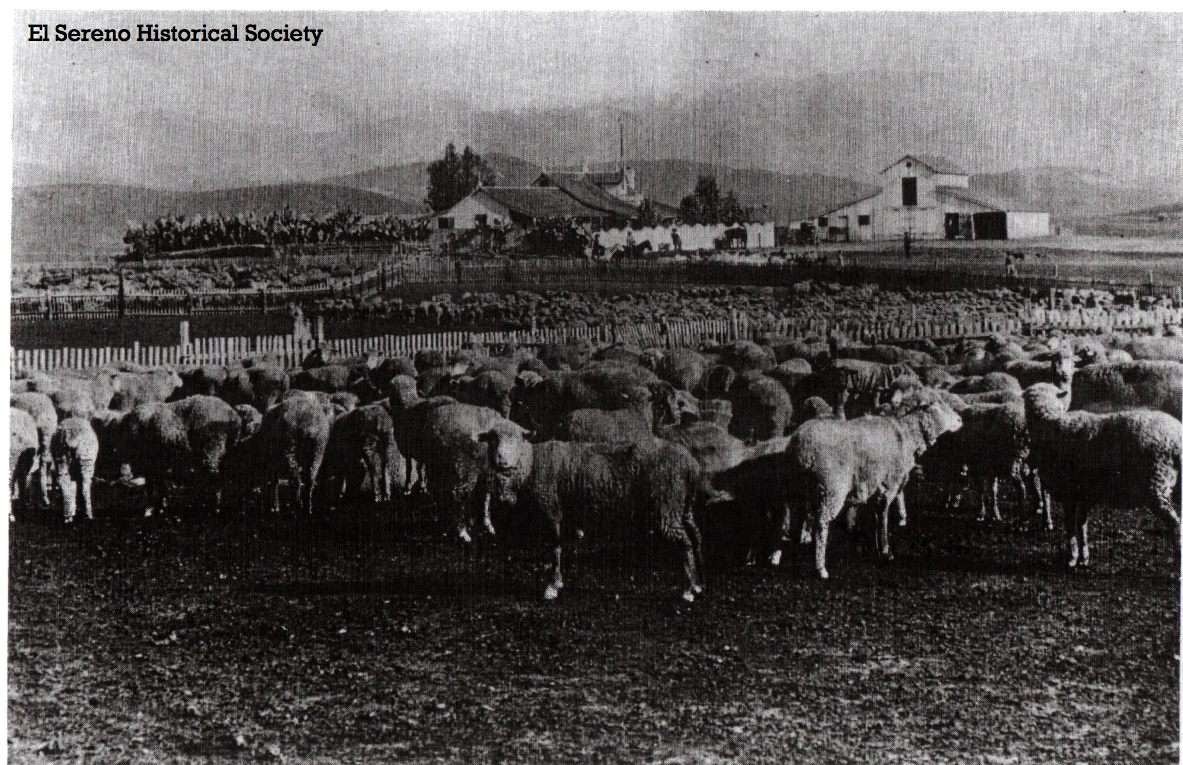
Rancho Rosa de Castilla, about 1880

Jacob Colvin Newton purchased a 160-acre L-shaped ranch stretching from the present Eastern and El Sereno avenues on the west to Guardia Avenue on the east about 1870. In the late 1880s, he bought the northern portion of the Batz Ranch from Francisca Batz Echeveste, a daughter of Catalina Batz. On the ranch was a modest cottage on the north side of what is now Huntington Drive at Van Horne Avenue. Newton grew hay and bred racing horses to run on his track just south of Roses Road (now Huntington Drive) and east of Farmdale Road (now Eastern Avenue).

Around 1870, the residence of Jesse Yarnell sat on a hill in what is now Rose Hill, at the western boundary of present El Sereno. A ranchhouse on the south side of Valley Boulevard, near the junction of present-day Eastern Avenue, was owned by the Hirigoyen family, which raised chickens, ducks, and pigs. A ranch west of what is now Eastern Avenue was owned by the Smith family. Their home and well were extant about 1885, just south of what is now Huntington Drive at Paola Avenue. The Smith estate was partitioned in 1885. The Cornwall family built a house about 1885 on part of the former Smith property, near present-day Eastern Avenue and Harmony Lane. Most of this ranch was later bought by Evan Evans.

A large acreage in the vicinity of present Monterey Road and Collis Avenue was owned by Hancock M. Johnston, one of the owners of the Los Angeles Herald and a co founder of East Los Angeles (now Lincoln Heights, Los Angeles). This land later passed to Marcos A. Forster of San Juan Capistrano, a nephew of Pio Pico, who subsequently subdivided the parcel. Sheep and cattle ranching was gradually replaced by agriculture and stock raising. The farmers grew hay and barley, raised pigs and chickens and ran dairies. During a real estate boom, the Yorba and Paige Tract, at the western edge of El Sereno, was recorded in October 1887. The adjacent Omaha Heights Tract was recorded in 1892.

==== Lack of development ====
The area did not develop greatly between 1870 and 1900 because of the lack of local transportation and of adequate water. What's more, residential, commercial, and industrial growth encircled the area. To the west was the community of East Los Angeles (later Lincoln Heights), subdivided in 1873. To the southwest was Boyle Heights, subdivided in 1876. To the east were Alhambra, subdivided in 1874, and Ramona/Shorb. To the north were Pasadena, subdivided in 1874, and the first subdivisions, platted 1885, of the future South Pasadena.

Nevertheless, the sheepherding and farming business of Catalina Batz and her children was successful and afforded them an affluent lifestyle. Other landowners were successful as well: Some of them lived in the city and kept horses at their country ranches. Unlike the real estate promoters of the surrounding territory, none of these wealthy and comfortable owners had an incentive to develop their land.

==== Roads ====
After 1858, the Butterfield stages ran east of Los Angeles along Valley Boulevard. A stop was at The Five Mile House Saloon and watering trough just south of Valley Boulevard, adjacent to the present Long Beach Freeway. By 1869, what is now Mission Road/Collis Avenue proceeded from the western end of the present El Sereno through a pass in the hills to the Rancho San Pasqual. Roses Road was established by 1873, beginning at the present intersection of Huntington Drive and Collis Avenue and proceeding east. Later known as Los Angeles-Pasadena Road and East Los Angeles Road, it passed approximately where Huntington Drive is today.

==== Railroads ====
The Southern Pacific Railroad was built through the El Sereno area in 1876, with a stop at Aurant. Catalina Batz purchased most of the excess lands adjacent to the tracks after the railroad was completed. Because of Southern Pacific's high rates, development of this area did not follow. Competition soon followed, with the arrival of the Santa Fe Railroad, which built trackage to Los Angeles in 1887. A fare war between the two railroads lowered rates, bringing many immigrants from the East and Midwest to Los Angeles.

==== Water ====
Water sources for the area were the Arroyo Rosa de Castilla and another ditch that ran north to south just west of present-day Eastern Avenue. The small Ascot Reservoir, being used by 1894 to store water, did not have the capacity to meet the needs of the many subdivisions that were later to bring new residents to the area (section below).

==== South Pasadena ====
The area of present-day El Sereno, south to Twining Street, was included as part of the City of South Pasadena during its incorporation on February 29, 1888. A vote taken on September 28, 1889, however, excluded from the city limits all land south of West Alhambra Road (effective October 2, 1889). A majority of the voters within the revised city limits wanted to prohibit alcoholic drinking establishments within the borders of the city. All the voters in the excluded territory were in favor of exclusion, as they did not want to be in a "dry" town. The same year saw the establishment of a new Farmdale School District and the building of the Farmdale School. This area, as well as South Pasadena, had been part of the Pasadena School District. The prohibitionist sentiments of Pasadena and South Pasadena may have been the impetus for the creation of the new school district.

=== Development (1902 to 1911) ===
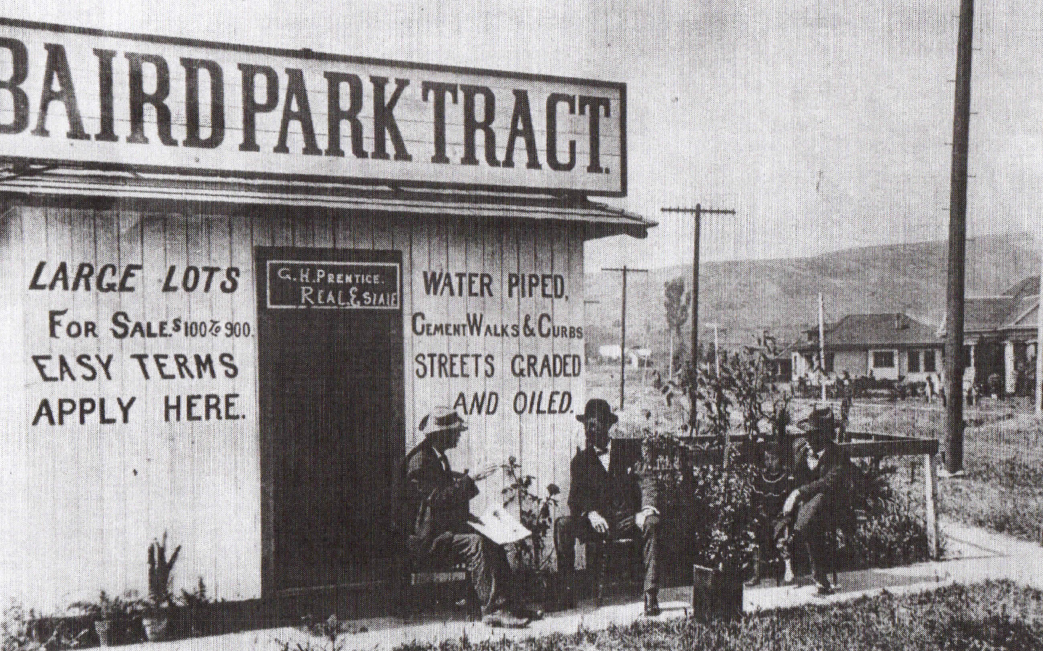
Sales office for Baird Park, 1904

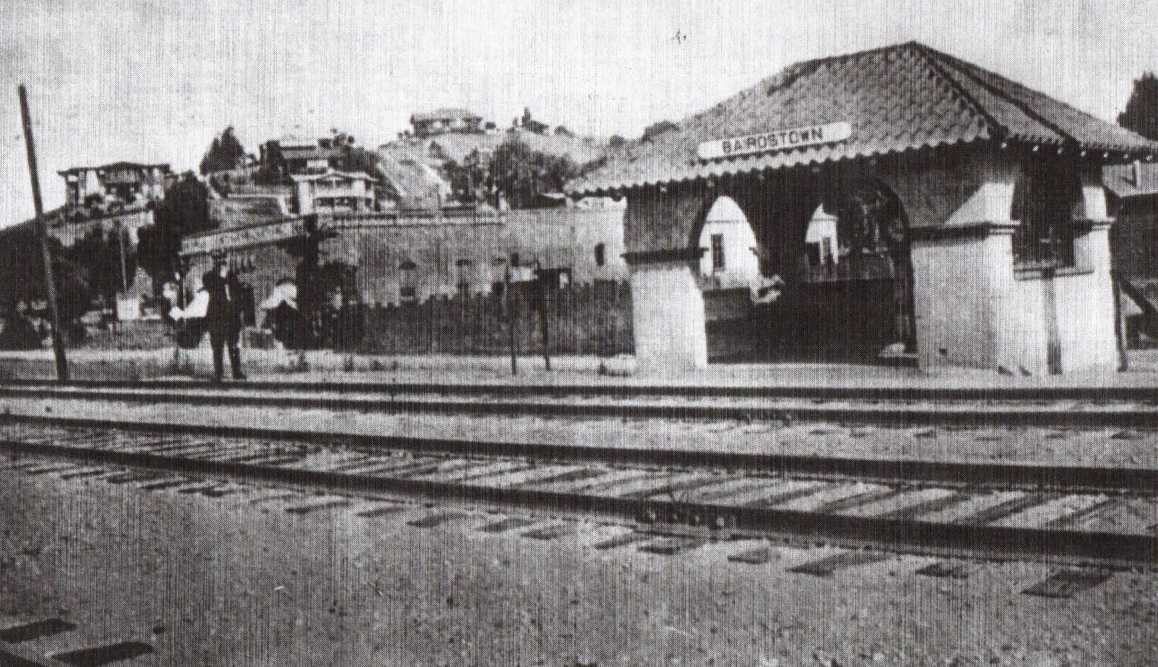
Bairdstown station, 1907

On May 1, 1895, the first inter-urban rail route in Southern California opened from Los Angeles to Pasadena along the Arroyo Seco, spurring subdivisions along that passage. In 1902, the Pasadena Short Line was opened along Los Angeles-Pasadena Boulevard, now Huntington Drive. A brightening economic climate and the rail line were the impetus for the residential subdivision of agricultural land. By 1915, eleven tracts had been subdivided in the Bairdstown area, centered at Farmdale Avenue (now Eastern Avenue) and Huntington Drive. The easternmost central tract was the Navarro Tract, owned by the Janss Company. Recorded in March 1909, it was later known as Sierra Park. At the southern end of Bairdstown, between El Monte Road (now Valley Boulevard) and the Covina Line of the Pacific Electric, was Grider and Hamilton's Floral Park, a subdivision of large lots recorded April 1906. This subdivision remained vacant, however, until the 1940s. The only subdivision lots designed to draw affluent buyers were those on a hilltop in the Baird Park Tract and in Baird's Pasadena Short Line Tract. With the exception of a few scattered houses, however, these subdivisions filed to generate the building of upscale homes.

At the farthest eastern end of what is now El Sereno was the Short Line Villa Tract, subdivided in August 1906. It was adjacent to two previously subdivided tracts in the City of South Pasadena: The expense that Henry Huntington incurred to build the Oneonta Park Pacific Electric Railway Station indicates that these adjacent subdivisions were designed to attract upper-middle-class buyers.

The influx of new residents created a need for community facilities, such as churches, schools, and a social center. The latter, which met at the Lincoln School Auditorium, was established in 1911 and bore three names within just five years – Bairdstown, Farmdale and Lincoln – indicating that the community was in search of an identity. The Bairdstown Improvement Association, formed in 1911, met in the same auditorium.

Llewellyn Baird, a brother of early subdividers, was a booster for this area. He was able to attract businesses. Some early enterprises were the Blomquist and Lindquist Nursery, the California Metal Enameling Company and the Dillingham Printing Company. The main commercial block with a grocery, meat market and general store/post office was established a few years after 1903.

From 1900 to 1915, the area that later became El Sereno lacked a unified identity. There was no coordinated plan for the community. Subdivisions were platted haphazardly by each property owner, resulting in four distinct neighborhoods, each with its own school as a focal point. Known as Rose Hill, Bairdstown, Farmdale and Sierra Vista, they were grouped together under the name "Bairdstown," giving a true sense of community until after annexation by Los Angeles in 1915.

=== Annexation and community (1912 to 1929) ===
The Short Line Villa Tract was annexed to the City of Los Angeles as part of the Arroyo Seco annexation on February 9, 1912. The annexation also included the Yorba and Paige Tract, Grider and Hamilton's Rose Hill Tract adjacent to Monterey Road, and Pasadena Villa Tract – which extended south from the Arroyo Seco.

Soon after Bairdstown was annexed to the City of Los Angeles on June 10, 1915, the Bairdstown Improvement Association changed its name to the Northeast Los Angeles Improvement Association (1916). One year later, the name of Bairdstown was changed to "El Sereno" meaning serene, quiet, unruffled place. With annexation to Los Angeles, El Sereno's population began to grow, resulting in the establishment of many community facilities. During the 1920s, churches, theaters, and banks were built. Schools were expanded. Many new middle-class subdivisions were built in Period Revival styles.

Two new theaters provided local entertainment. A one-story theatre and brick store building, erected on Huntington Drive in 1922, was designed by architect A. Godfrey Bailey. The Cameo Theatre, along with stores and offices, was built in 1924, with J. T. Payne as the architect. A fire station and municipal building was built in 1927 on the northwestern comer of Rosemead Avenue and Huntington Drive.

A branch of the Bank of Alhambra, designed by architect Lester Squire, was built at 4900 Huntington Drive in 1924. Residential development was centered along Huntington Drive, between Collis and Farnsworth avenues, from the hills on the north to Gambier/Allan Street on the south. Other areas of concentrated development were the Rose Hill/Omaha HElghts and Pasadena Villa areas adjacent to Lincoln Heights and the Sierra Vista area. A one-block-deep development strip on the north side of Huntington Drive tied Sierra Vista to central El Sereno.

Clubs and organizations also developed in El Sereno. By the mid-1920s, the Masons, Eastern Star, Knights of Columbus, El Sereno Athletic Club, Odd Fellows, and Garfield Study Club (founded 1924) were providing opportunities for social interaction and philanthropy. The Van Horne Improvement Association was holding meetings at the El Sereno School, while the El Sereno-Farmdale Improvement Association held its meetings at the Farmdale School. The El Sereno Theatre, the third theater of the district, was built in 1940 at 3333 Eastern Avenue.

=== Depression years (1930 to 1938) ===
The Great Depression was felt in El Sereno, where no subdivisions were recorded from 1930 to 1939. Physically separated from the rest of town, the Sierra Vista neighborhood considered itself a separate community until the late 1930s. The neighborhood, anchored by the Sierra Vista School, expanded westward from the Short Line Villa Tract. The separate community identity also was engendered by the Sierra Vista Pacific Electric Railway Station, which served the community.

=== World War II (1939 to 1945) ===
El Sereno's population rose markedly as the country prepared for the war. Because of rationing of gas and rubber, most new residents who came to work at the aircraft and munitions factories in Los Angeles moved to communities along the Pacific Electric routes. El Sereno experienced major industrial growth during the war years. Many of the families that moved here at the time were Italian-American. The rise in population led to the construction of the El Sereno Theatre at 3333 Eastern Avenue; it was the third theater in the community.

=== After World War II ===
Restrictive covenants had prevented Mexican-American families who lived in the adjacent communities of Lincoln Heights and Boyle Heights from purchasing homes in El Sereno. After restrictions were lifted by a 1948 Supreme Court decision (Shelley v. Kraemer), many Mexican-American families moved to El Sereno. The demand for housing after World War II was satisfied by the construction of new neighborhoods in the southern end of El Sereno.

Like other neighboring communities in northeast Los Angeles, El Sereno is going through gentrification as many older and longtime homeowners are replaced by professionals and young families.

== Geography ==
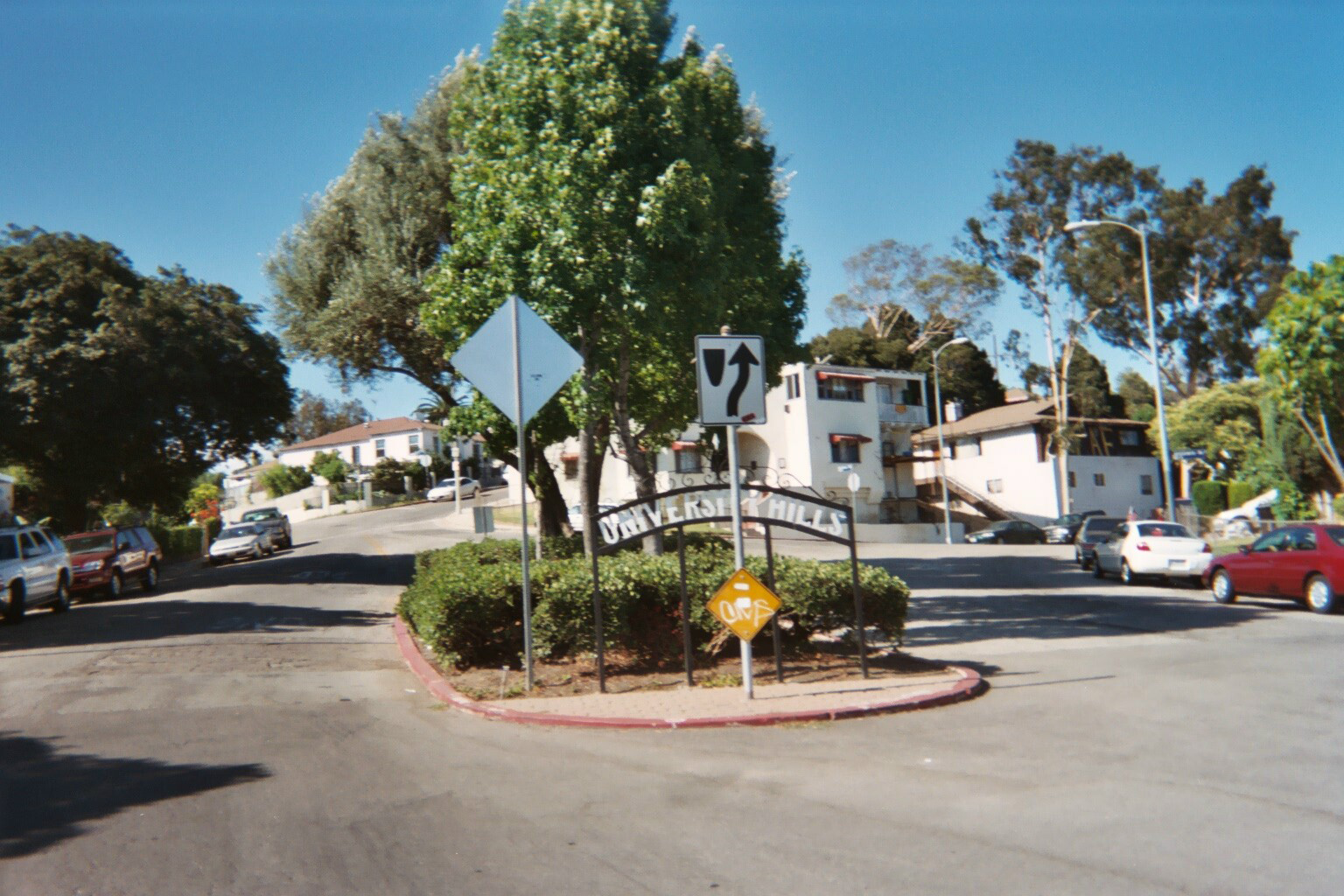
Entrance to University Hills, 2006

El Sereno is 4.17 square miles (10.8 km^{2}) and has a population of 43,766. It has a population density of 9,826 people per square mile, which is about average for the City of Los Angeles.

The neighboring communities are University Hills, Boyle Heights, East Los Angeles, Lincoln Heights, Montecito Heights, Highland Park, and the cities of Alhambra, Monterey Park and South Pasadena.

Areas within El Sereno:

- Hillside Village

== Demographics ==
El Sereno is a predominantly Mexican American community in Los Angeles. In the year 2000, Mexican (67.0%) and Chinese (4.7%) were the most common ancestries. The median age that year was 28, resulting in a youthful population, compared with the city and county in general. The percentage of residents aged 10 or younger was among the county's highest. The average household size of 3.5 people was high for both the city and the county. The median household income for the neighborhood was $45,866 in 2008 dollars, which was about average for the City of Los Angeles.

U.S. Census data from 2010 showed the population to be of 79.6% Hispanic and 10.8% Asian ethnicity. The median household income was $47,359.

== Education ==
=== History ===
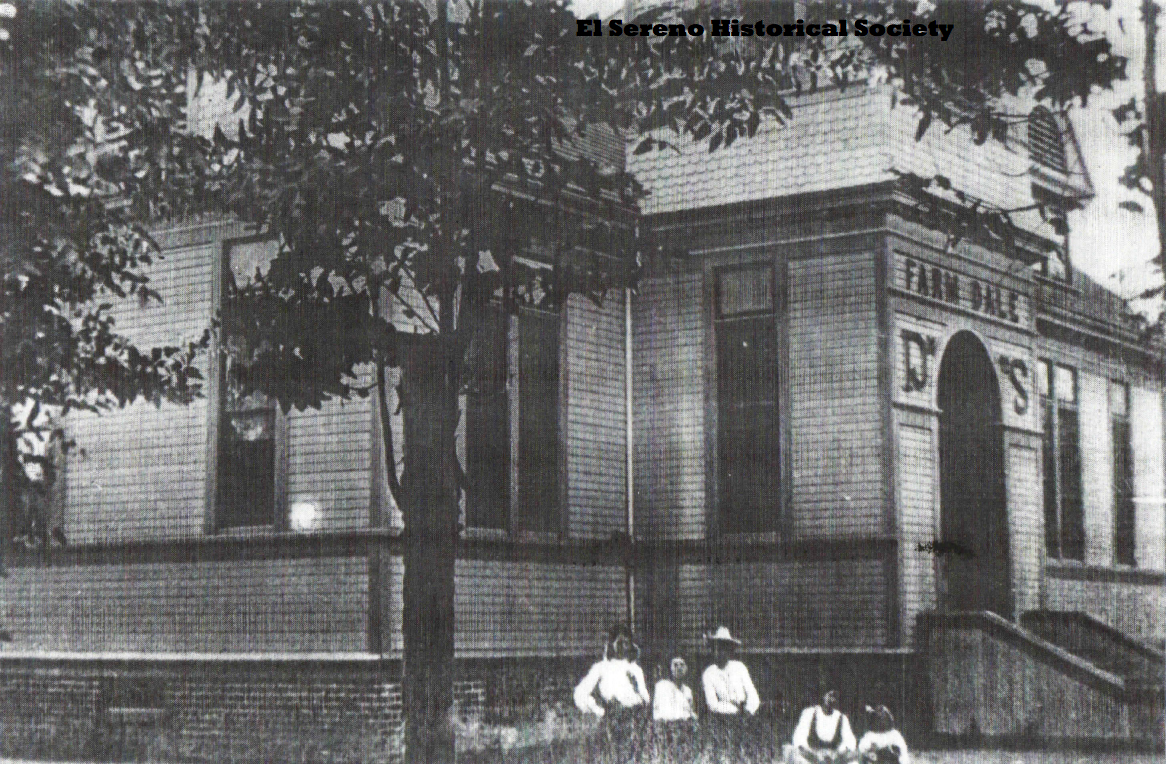
Farmdale School, 1904

California State University, Los Angeles 2007

The Historic Farmdale School House was the first school in the area. The Farmdale School House was built in 1892 and is registered in the National Register of Historic Places. The second school Rose Hill, (now Huntington Drive), was built in 1909 at the western end of what is now El Sereno. The third schoolhouse was Lincoln School. Architect Frederick Noonan designed the eight-room Mission-style building. Built in 1911, it was located in Newton Park and was later known as the Bairdstown School and then El Sereno School. In 1910, the Los Angeles Military Academy was established by Ida B. McKinnon at the southwestern corner of Farmdale Avenue (Eastern) and Huntington Drive. Designed in the Craftsman style, the Sierra Vista School was built in the Short Line Villa Tract in 1913.

El Sereno School was enlarged in 1924 by the architectural firm of Monaco & Bordeaux. An addition to the Farmdale School also was built that same year.

El Sereno High School was built in 1936 on Eastern Avenue, on the site of the old Farmdale School. The old schoolhouse, minus its tower, was moved to the back of the lot, to be used as classroom space for woodworking. In 1937, the name of the high school was changed to Wilson High School.

=== Profile ===
Just 9.4% of residents aged 25 and older held a four-year college degree, which was a low figure for both the city and the county. There was a high percentage of residents of that age with less than a high school diploma.

=== Schools ===
Pre-collegiate schools within El Sereno are:

Public high schools

- Anahuacalmecac, charter, 4736 Huntington Drive South
- Los Angeles County High School for the Arts, 5151 State University Drive
- Woodrow Wilson, 4500 Multnomah Street

Public elementary schools:

- Academia Semillas del Pueblo, charter, 4736 Huntington Drive South
- Cesar Chavez, 5243 Oakland Street
- El Sereno, 3838 Rosemead Avenue
- Farmdale, 2660 Ruth Swiggett Drive
- Huntington Drive, 4435 Huntington Dr N
- Multnomah Street, 2101 North Indiana Avenue
- Sierra Park, 3170 Budau Avenue
- Sierra Vista Elementary, 4342 Alpha Street

Private elementary school:

- All Saints, 3420 Portola Avenue

Middle school:

- El Sereno, 2839 North Eastern Avenue

=== University ===
- California State University, Los Angeles

== Public libraries ==
A community library was established in 1915, but a permanent library building was not erected until 1959. The El Sereno Branch of the Los Angeles Public Library is now at 5226 S. Huntington Drive.

== Religion ==
A Presbyterian church was erected in 1908 on a lot donated by the Baird Park Trust Company. Episcopal services were held at the Bairdstown Hall after 1911. A Catholic chapel was established in El Sereno in 1921. By 1926, the parish had grown large enough to establish a small frame church at 3728 Rosemead Avenue. A new Presbyterian church was built in 1923 at Portola Avenue and Navarro Street. One of the two lots upon which the church was built was donated by the Janss Company; the other was purchased. The architect for this Mission Revival-style church was Henry Pierce. In 1928, the El Sereno Evangelical Lutheran Church, designed by architect Walter Hagedohm, was dedicated. Services, previously held at the Cameo Theatre, were moved to the new building at the comer of Eastern Avenue and Twining Street.

The Iglesia Bautista Mexicana de Rose Hills (Rose Hills Mexican Baptist Church) was established in 1925. Its building on the corner of Victorine and Boundary Streets was dedicated on April 24, 1926. On August 10, 1954, the church changed its name to Iglesia Bautista Emmanuel (Emmanuel Baptist Church) and relocated to Huntington Drive South.

A new All Saints Catholic Church, completed in 1931, was a major undertaking for El Sereno's Catholic residents. This large Mission-style church required large donations from its parishioners as Catholics were a very small minority in the community. The majority of El Sereno's residents were Protestants from Northern European backgrounds. The Sierra Vista Community Church on Maycrest Avenue was the only local church not located in central El Sereno.

== Public services ==
Los Angeles Fire Department Station 16 (South El Sereno) and Station 47 (El Sereno) are within the community. The fire station and municipal building. were built in 1927 on the northwestern comer of Rosemead Avenue and Huntington Drive. The neighborhood is served by the Los Angeles Police Department Hollenbeck Division

The Los Angeles County Department of Health Services operates the Central Health Center in Downtown Los Angeles, serving El Sereno.

There are multiple public city parks located within El Sereno, including Ascot Hills Park, Guardia Park, and El Sereno Arroyo Playground.

== In popular culture ==
=== Fear The Walking Dead ===
On the AMC TV show Fear the Walking Dead, El Sereno plays prominently in the first season.

- Two main characters on the show, Madison Clark played by Kim Dickens and Travis Manawa played by Cliff Curtis, work at a high school in El Sereno, as a guidance counselor and an English teacher respectively. Clark's daughter Alicia played by Alycia Debnam-Carey also attends the school as a student.

Victor Strand: Where's your house?

Nick Clark: Close. El Sereno.

Victor: Oldest community in Los Angeles. Predates the city. Vibrant, blue collar, diverse. I'd gentrify the shit out of El Sereno.

— Robert Kirkman and Dave Erickson, Fear the Walking Dead, Season 1, Episode 6.
- In the sixth episode of the first season, titled The Good Man, Victor Strand played by Colman Domingo and Nick Clark played by Frank Dillane discuss the neighborhood of El Sereno directly.
- Significant portions of the first season were shot in El Sereno, and many recognizable neighborhood landmarks are visible, including Woodrow Wilson Senior High School.

== See also ==
- Parley Parker Christensen, Los Angeles City Council member who objected to including El Sereno in his district.
