= City Terrace, California =

Unincorporated community in California, United States

- Unincorporated community
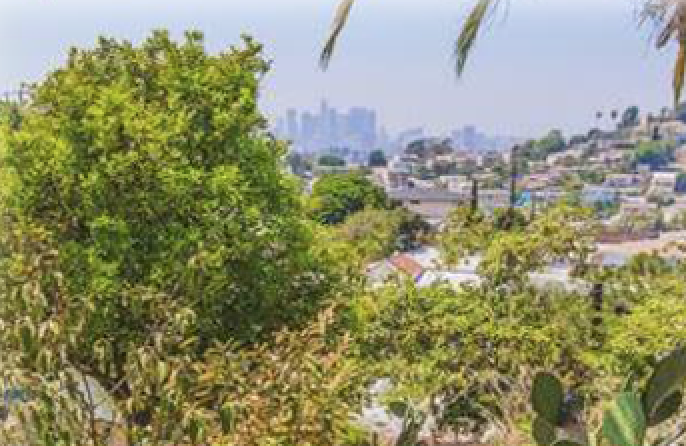
- City Terrace

- Location within Los Angeles County

- Location within the state of California
- Coordinates: 34°3′0″N 118°10′55″W
- Country: United States
- State: California
- County: Los Angeles
- Time zone: UTC-8 (Pacific (PST))
  - Summer (DST): UTC-7 (PDT)
- ZIP codes: 90063
- Area code: 213/323

City Terrace is an unincorporated area of East Los Angeles, in Los Angeles County, California, United States, east of Downtown Los Angeles. It contains City Terrace Elementary School, Robert F. Kennedy Elementary School, Esteban Torres High School, Harrison Elementary School, William R. Anton Elementary School, Hammel Street Elementary School, Anthony Quinn Library, City Terrace Library, and City Terrace Park. It is part of the Census-designated place of East Los Angeles.

== Community description ==
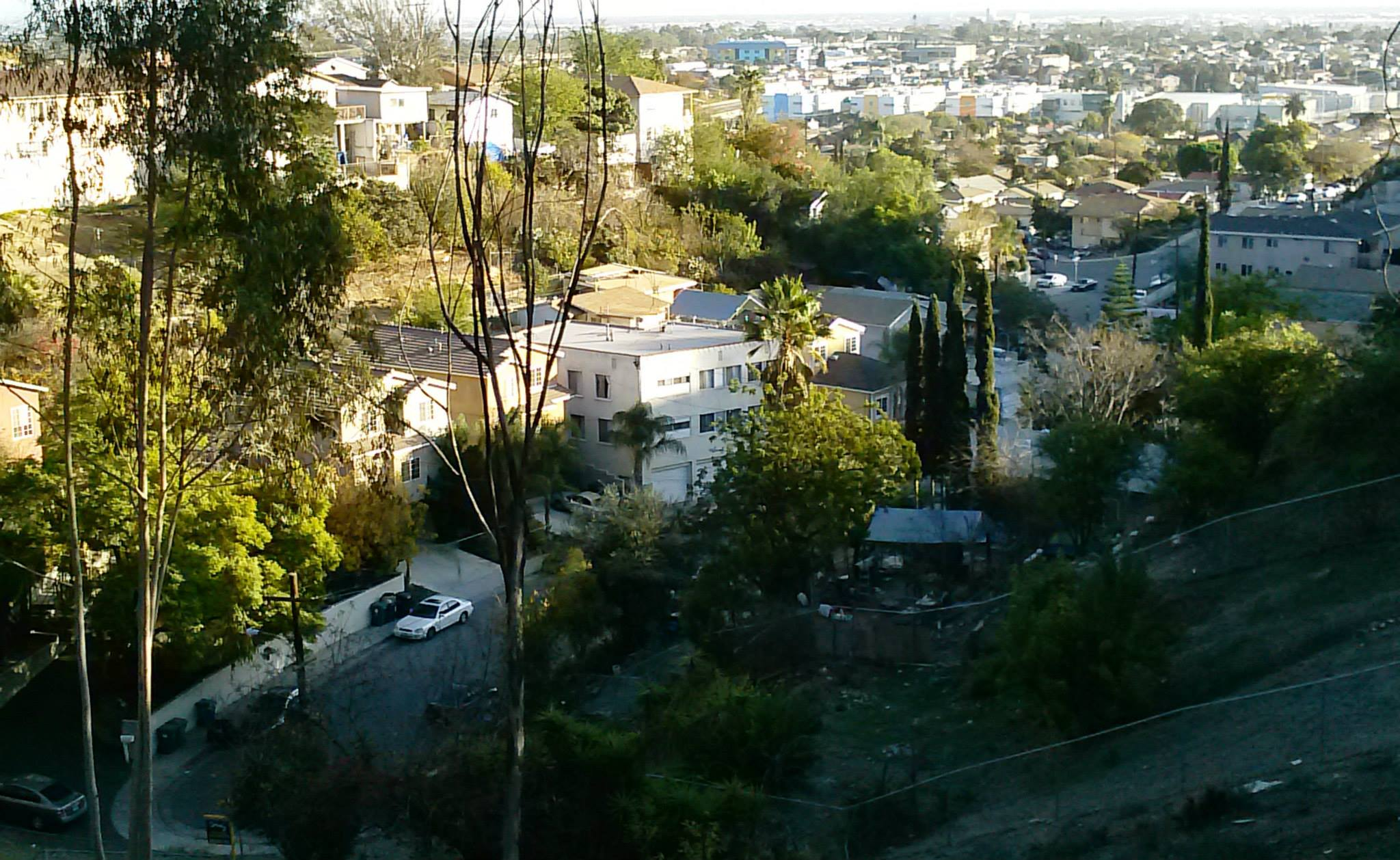
City Terrace Streets

City Terrace is located atop the southwestern Repetto Hills. The district's steep, winding streets are lined with generally well-preserved Spanish Colonial Revival style houses.

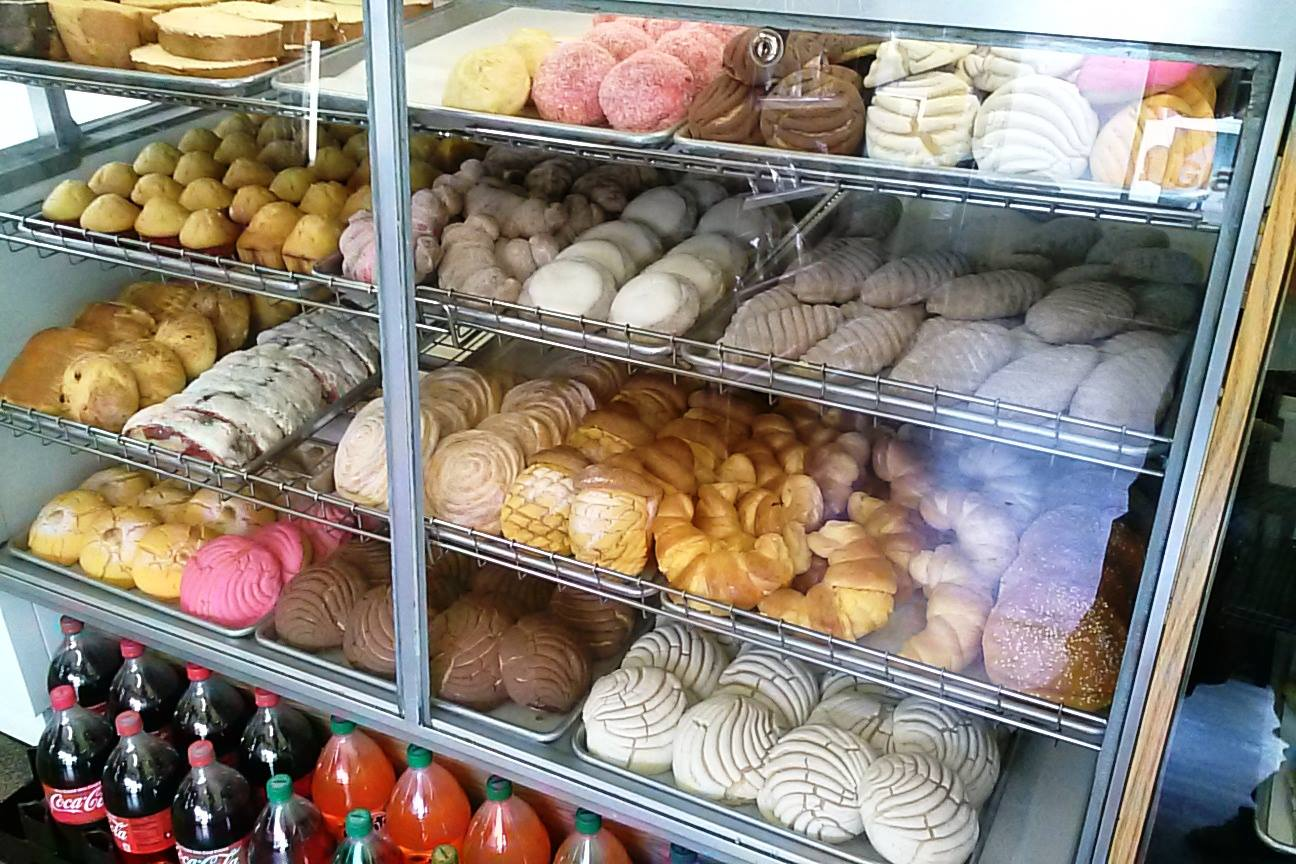
Alvarez Bakery in City Terrace.

== Transportation ==
Light rail service to Los Angeles is provided by the Metro E Line's Eastside Extension, which opened in 2009. Los Angeles County Metropolitan Transportation Authority (Metro) provides bus service from City Terrace to throughout the Los Angeles area. In addition, local shuttle service is provided by the El Sol (City Terrace and East Los Angeles Shuttle) and LADOT DASH (City Terrace and El Sereno).

== Geography ==
City Terrace is bounded by the city limits of Los Angeles on the north and west, Floral Drive, on the south the city limits of Los Angeles. Monterey Park and East Los Angeles on the East. Boyle Heights is on the west, Lincoln Heights, El Sereno, University Hills, California State University, Los Angeles is to the northwest, and City of Commerce are to the south. Major thoroughfares include Medford St., Eastern Ave., 3rd St., 4th St., Evergreen Ave. and City Terrace Dr. The community is part of ZIP code 90063 and area code 323.

== History ==
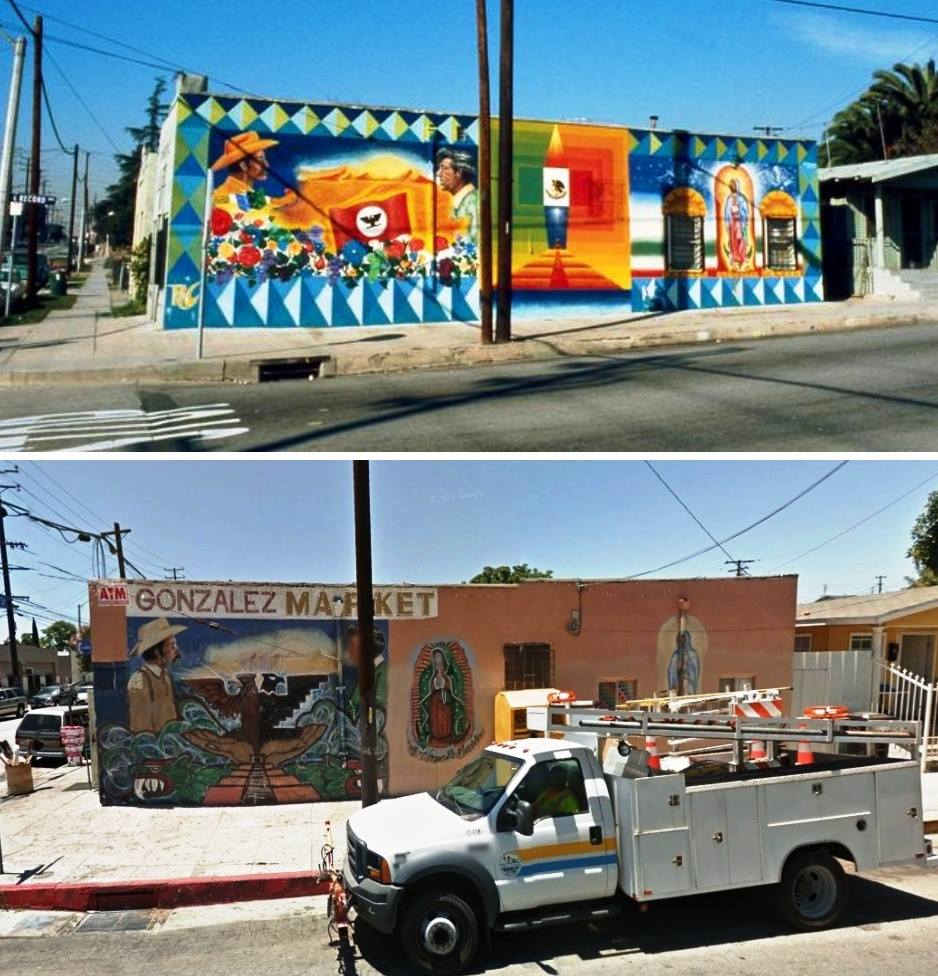
Record Avenue & Hammel Street

City Terrace is a neighborhood saturated with art. The Goez Art Studio was co-founded by David Rivas Botello, Jose-Luis Gonzalez and Juan Gonzalez in 1969. In 1975, Botello and Wayne Alaniz Healy co-founded Los Dos Streetscapers, later adding Charles Solares, Fabian Debora, George Yepes, Paul Botello, Ricardo Duffy, Rich Raya, and Rudy Calderon to their ranks and renaming themselves East Los Streetscapers. The ceramic mural at the City Terrace Branch Library, Ofrenda Maya 1, was created by Goez Studios' Jose Luis Gonzalez. Another mural created in 1994 by George Yepes, a member of the East Los Streetscapers who is known for creating the cover art for Los Lobos' 1988 album, is seen on one of the walls at City Terrace Elementary.

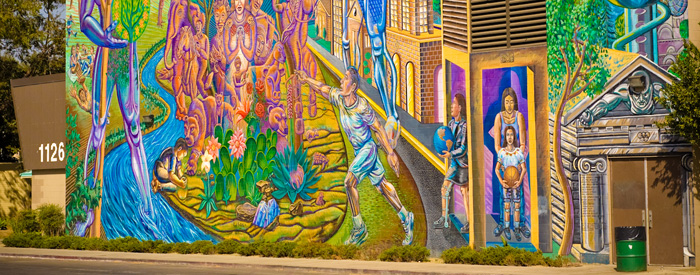
City Terrace Park Mural

== Park ==
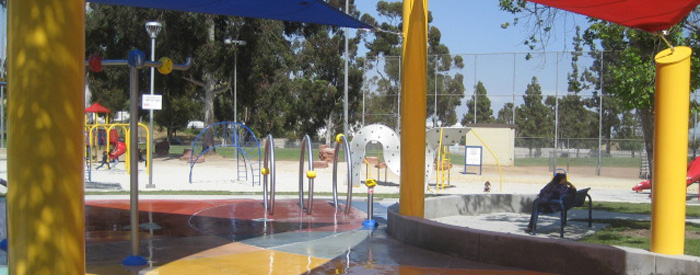
City Terrace Park

City Terrace Park was developed in 1933 by Works Progress Administration crews. It occupied a piece of 3.5 acres (1.4 hectares) terrace that was formed after crews hacked a rugged and barren hill. In 1957, 600,000 cubic yards (460,000 m^{3}) of soil that had been removed from the construction of the Los Angeles Civic Center was transported to the City Terrace County Park. The soil filled a ravine, tripling the park's original acreage. It has swimming, basketball and tennis, plus a playground, a splash pad, picnic areas and a gymnasium. In addition, City Terrace Park hosts many activities for youth and Teens such as cheer, basketball and computer club, as well as activities for adults and families such as ceramics classes and aquatics programs.

== Library ==
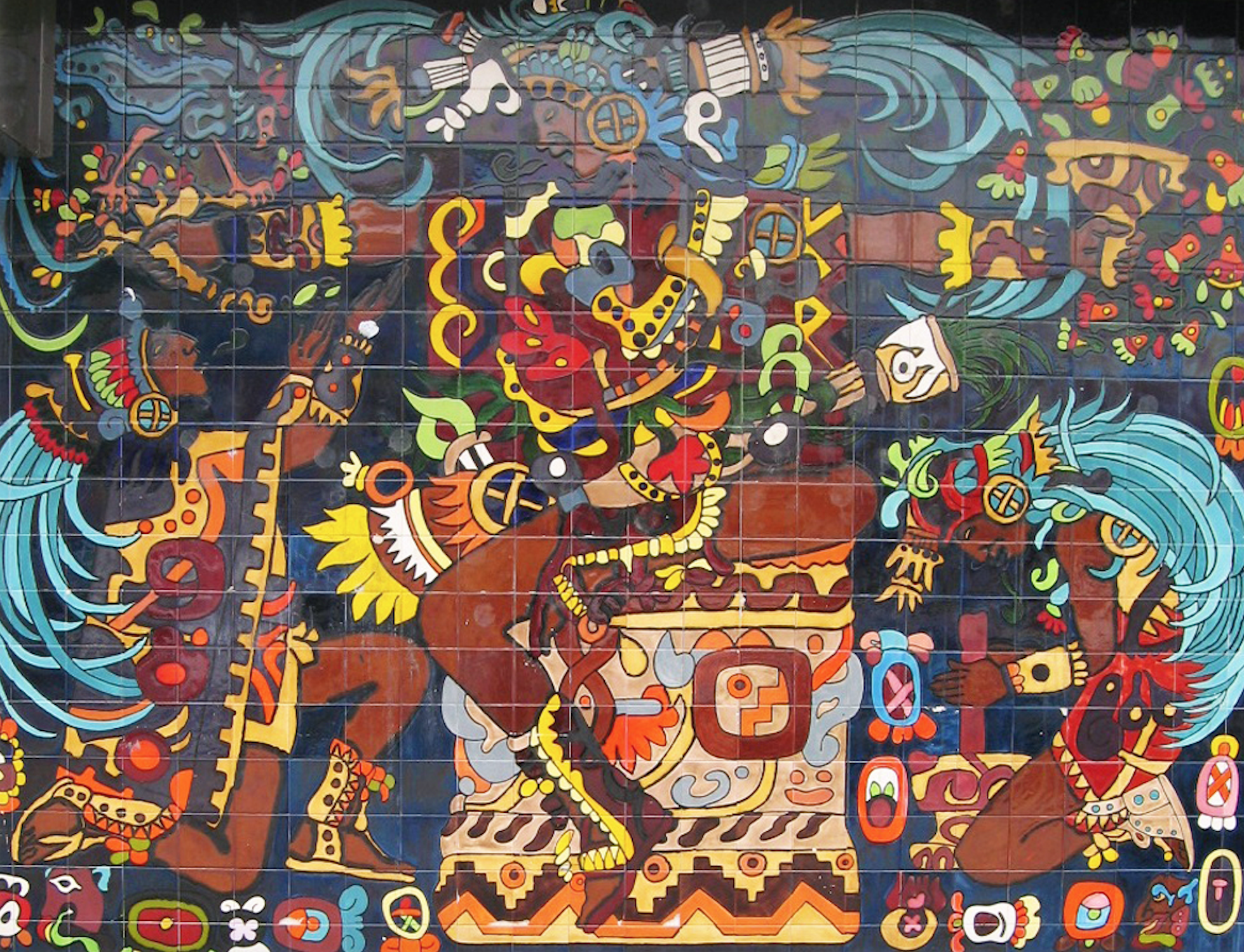
City Terrace Library Mural

The County of Los Angeles Public Library operates the City Terrace Library. The library has been in its current location since 1979 and was refurbished in 2009. The library offers homework help for children and teens, internet resources such as downloadable audio books, and occasionally hosts seminars for the community.

== Other infrastructure ==
The Los Angeles County Department of Health Services operates the Central Health Center in Downtown Los Angeles, serving City Terrace.

== Government ==
City Terrace is in the:

• 34th US congressional district, represented by Rep. Jimmy Gomez (D)

• 51st State Assembly district, represented by Assembly Member Wendy Carrillo

• 5th District Los Angeles County Unified School District, represented by Board Member Jackie Goldberg

== Education ==
The Los Angeles Unified School District serves City Terrace. The district operates City Terrace Elementary School, Robert F. Kennedy Elementary School, William R. Anton Elementary School, Harrison Elementary School Belvedere Middle School and Esteban Torres High School.

== Notable people ==
- Anthony Quinn, actor
- Antonio Villaraigosa, politician and mayor of Los Angeles
