= Renaissance (disambiguation) =

The Renaissance (French for 'rebirth') was a period in European history in the 15th and 16th centuries, characterized by an effort to revive and surpass ideas and achievements of classical antiquity. Parallel developments include

- Renaissance philosophy
- Renaissance literature
- Renaissance art
- Renaissance sculpture
- Renaissance music
- Renaissance architecture
- Renaissance science
- Renaissance technology

Renaissance may also refer to:

== Cultural movements ==
=== In Africa ===
- African Renaissance, the concept that African people and nations shall achieve cultural, scientific, and economic renewal
- Arab Renaissance (Arabic: النهضة, an-Nahḍah), a cultural renaissance from the late 19th century in Egypt and the Arabic world
- Ethiopian Renaissance, sociopolitical movement and national myth espousing positive attitude for traditions and history of Ethiopia

=== In the Americas ===
- American Renaissance (disambiguation), several meanings
- Chicago Black Renaissance, a creative movement in the 1930s and 1940s
- Disney Renaissance, series of film releases from 1989-1999 by Walt Disney Animation Studios that saw the company achieve renewed critical and commercial success
- Harlem Renaissance, an intellectual, social, and artistic explosion in 1920s New York City
- Hawaiian Renaissance, a resurgence of distinct cultural identity
- Native American Renaissance, an increase in literary works by Native Americans from the 1960s
- San Francisco Renaissance, a range of poetic activity
- Southern Renaissance (United States), the reinvigoration of American Southern literature in the 1920s and 1930s

=== In Asia and Oceania ===
- Bengali Renaissance, a cultural, social, intellectual and artistic movement during the British Indian Empire
- Islamic Renaissance, a revival of the Islamic religion (not to be confused with Islamic Golden Age)
- Omani Renaissance, Omani modernization era that began in 1970
- Persian Renaissance, a period in history which saw the rise of various native Iranian Muslim dynasties in the Iranian Plateau after the 7th-century Muslim conquest of Iran and the fall of Sasanian Empire
- Māori renaissance, a late-20th-century revival in New Zealand
- Sumerian Renaissance, outdated term for a perceived renaissance of Sumerian literature during the Ur III period
- Timurid Renaissance, religious, scientific, and artistic historical period from 14th to 16th century

=== In Europe ===
- High Renaissance, a short period of exceptional artistic production in the Italian states around 1500
- Italian Renaissance, a period from the 14th to 17th centuries
- Macedonian Renaissance, the period of the Macedonian dynasty of the Byzantine Empire (867–1056)
- Palaeologan Renaissance, the period of the Palaiologoi, the last dynasty of the Byzantine Empire (1261–1453)
- Medical Renaissance, a period of progress in European medical knowledge from 1400 to 1700
- The three medieval renaissances
  - Carolingian Renaissance, a period of cultural activity in the Carolingian Empire
  - Ottonian Renaissance, a renaissance of Byzantine and Late Antique art in Europe in the Ottonian dynasty (936–1002)
  - Renaissance of the 12th century, a period of change at the outset of the high Middle Ages
- Portuguese Renaissance, a cultural and artistic movement in Portugal during the 15th and 16th centuries
- Provençal Renaissance (French: Le Félibrige, Occitan: Lo Felibritge or Lou Felibrige), a literary and cultural association in France
- Roman Renaissance, from the mid-15th to the mid-16th centuries
- Scottish Renaissance, a mainly literary movement of the early to mid-20th century
- Urban renaissance (UK), a recent period of repopulation and regeneration of many British cities
- Yiddish Renaissance, a cultural and linguistic movement among Eastern European Jews in the late 19th century

=== Other cultural movements ===
- Dinosaur renaissance, renewed academic and popular interest in dinosaurs from the late 1960s
- Neo-Renaissance, a group of 19th century architectural revival styles
- Nuclear renaissance, a possible nuclear power industry revival

== Arts and entertainment ==
=== Music ===
==== Bands and labels ====
- Renaissance (band), an English progressive rock band
- Renaissance (club), a British electronic dance music club brand and record label
- Renaissance Recordings, a British record label

==== Albums ====
- Renaissance (The Association album), 1966
- Renaissance (Beyoncé album), 2022
- Renaissance (Branford Marsalis album), 1987
- Renaissance (Cheyenne Jackson album), 2016
- Renaissance (Diablo album), 2002
- The Renaissance (E.Town Concrete album), 2003
- Renaissance (Lionel Richie album), 2000
- Renaissance (Marcus Miller album), 2012
- Renaissance (Mickey Finn's T. Rex album), 2002
- Renaissance (The Miracles album), 1973
- Renaissance (Mónica Naranjo album), 2019
- The Renaissance (Q-Tip album), 2008
- Renaissance (Rémy album), 2022
- Renaissance (Renaissance album), 1969
- Renaissance (Soweto String Quartet album), 1996
- The Renaissance (Super Junior album), 2021
- Renaissance (The Underachievers album), 2017
- Renaissance (Vanilla Fudge album), 1968
- Renaissance (Village People album), 1981
- Renaissance: The Mix Collection, a 1994 album by Sasha & John Digweed
- Renaissance, a 1992 album by Allen Eager
- The Renaissance EP, by MxPx, 2001

==== Songs ====
- "Renaissance" (M People song), 1994
- "Renaissance" (Eminem song), 2024
- "Renaissance", by Barry Harris from Vicissitudes, 1975
- "Renaissance", by Hell Razah from Renaissance Child, 2007
- "Renaissance", by Jean-Luc Ponty from Aurora, 1976
- "Renaissance", by Lalo Schifrin from The Dissection and Reconstruction..., 1966
- "Renaissance", by Matt Kearney from Bullet, 2004
- "Renaissance", by San Fermin from San Fermin, 2013
- "Renaissance", by Tony Harris from Five, 2018
- "Renaissance", by Trudy Pitts from A Bucketful of Soul, 1968
- "Renaissance", by Virgin Black from Elegant... and Dying, 2003
- "Renaissance", by WJSN from Dream Your Dream, 2018
- "Renaissance 2.0", by R.A. the Rugged Man from Legendary Classics Volume 1, 2009
- "La Renaissance", the national anthem of the Central African Republic

=== Film and television ===
- Renaissance (1964 film), a French animated short
- Renaissance (2006 film), or Paris 2054: Renaissance
- Renaissance (TV show), a fictional show in the British TV series Moving Wallpaper
- Renaissance: A Film by Beyoncé, a 2023 documentary concert film by American singer Beyoncé

=== Literature ===
- Renaissance (novel), by Raymond F. Jones, 1951
- Renaissance Magazine, a publication about renaissance fairs
- The Renaissance, the English title for New Tide, a 1919–1922 Chinese student's magazine

=== Other uses in arts and entertainment ===
- Renaissance (Bakalar), a 1989 public artwork
- Renaissance (Fabergé egg), an 1894 jewelled agate Easter egg
- Renaissance (game), a historical, roleplaying play-by-mail game
- Ultima Online: Renaissance, a 2000 computer game expansion
- Disney Renaissance, a period between late 80s and 90s during which Walt Disney Studios returned to producing critically and commercially successful animated films
- Renaissance World Tour, a 2023 concert tour by American singer Beyoncé

== Businesses and organisations ==
=== Companies and establishments ===
- Renaissance (demogroup), creators of the Zone 66 video game
- Renaissance Ballroom & Casino, New York City, U.S.
- Renaissance Books, a bookstore in Milwaukee, Wisconsin, U.S.
- Renaissance Broadcasting, an American TV broadcasting company
- Renaissance Capital, a Russian investment bank
- Renaissance Capital Bank, a Ukrainian financial institution
- Renaissance Credit, a Russian commercial bank
- Renaissance Enterprises, an American nonprofit organization
- Renaissance Hotels, a hotel brand
- Renaissance Learning, an educational software company
- Renaissance restaurant, a restaurant inside Scientology Celebrity Centre's Château Élysée building
- Renaissance Technologies, a hedge fund management company
- Renaissance Theatre Company, a theatre production company 1987–1992
- Renaissance Theatre (Mansfield, Ohio), a movie theater

=== Politics ===
- Renaissance (French political party), or En Marche
- Renaissance (Italian political party)
- Renaissance (Monegasque political party)
- Renaissance Party (Egypt), founded 2011
- Egypt Renaissance Party, made up of former members of the National Democratic Party
- Ennahda, or Renaissance Party, in Tunisia
- L’Europe Ensemble Delegation to the European Parliament, originally called Renaissance

=== Schools ===
- Renaissance Academy (disambiguation), several uses
- Renaissance Charter School (disambiguation), several uses
- Renaissance College, in Hong Kong
- Renaissance College of Commerce and Management, in Indore, Madhya Pradesh, India
- Renaissance High School (Michigan), in Detroit, Michigan, U.S.
- Renaissance High School (Idaho), U.S.
- Renaissance University, Nigeria

== Sports ==
- Renaissance FC, a football club in N'Djamena, Chad
- Renaissance FC de Ngoumou, a football club in Ngoumou, Cameroon

== Transportation ==
- Renaissance Cruises, a Norwegian cruise ship operating company
- Renaissance (railcar), a fleet of passenger cars in Canada
- Renaissance Trains, a British rail transport company
- La Renaissance (barge) (French: The Renaissance), a hotel barge
- List of ships named Renaissance

=== Fictional transports ===
- Weyland-Yutani Renaissance, a fictional mobile space station composed of WY Romulus and WY Remus substations, the primary setting of the 2024 film Alien: Romulus

== Other uses ==
- Renaissance, Georgia, a rejected name for the city of South Fulton
- Renaissance, Lewisham, a mixed-use development in London, England
- Renaissance Community, a commune in the northeast US 1968–1988

== See also ==
- Renaissance fair (disambiguation)
- Renaissance Island (disambiguation)
- Renaissance Man (disambiguation)
- Renaissance theatre (disambiguation)
- Renaissance Tower (disambiguation)

Not to be confused with

- Ba'ath Party (disambiguation), (Arabic: بعث, romanized: baʿth, lit. 'resurrection'; "Renaissance Party")
- Renascence (disambiguation)
- Reconnaissance (disambiguation)
- Resurrection (disambiguation)
- Rebirth (disambiguation)
