= Hippo Press =

American newspaper publisher

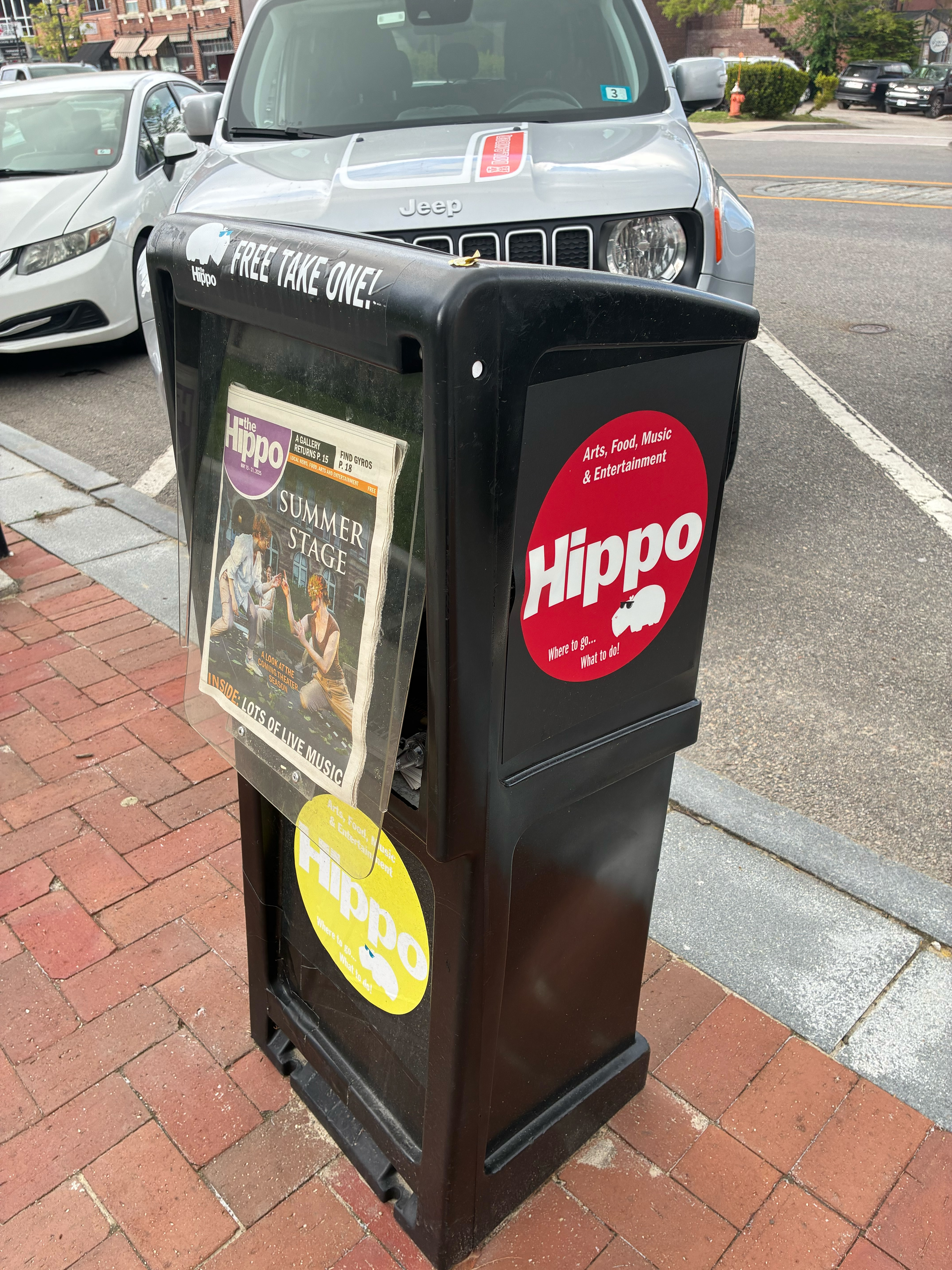
- Newspaper vending machine for the Hippo Press located in Concord, New Hampshire
- Type: Alternative weekly
- Owner(s): Jody Reese; Jeff Rapsis; Dan Szczesny
- Publisher: Hippo Press LLC
- Founded: January 2001
- Headquarters: Manchester, New Hampshire
- Website: hippopress.com

Hippo Press is the publisher of the free weekly newspaper Hippo, based in Manchester, New Hampshire. As of March 2026, it claims a print circulation of more than 34,000 free copies, distributed in more than 1,000 locations around the state of New Hampshire.

== History ==
In 2000, Jody Reese was hired to work was a reporter at the New Hampshire Union Leader. At that time he mainly covered the 2000 United States presidential election. In his free time, Reese published a blog, reporternotebook.com. The site featured tidbits, analysis and snarky satire he couldn't publish in the Union Leader. This was later changed to hippopress.com. Reese was soon joined by Dan Szczesny and a year later by Jeff Rapsis, both from the paper.

In January 2001, Reese, Rapsis, and Szczesny started the Hippo newspaper. In 2004, they launched a second edition in Nashua, and in 2005 started a third in Concord. In 2007, the editions were combined into one newspaper with a circulation of 42,000.

In 2009, the Hippo purchased The York Independent, a twice-monthly newspaper in York, Maine, that ceased publication around 2011.

=== Manchester Express ===
Manchester Express logo

On May 22, 2006, the Hippo's owners launched a free weekday newspaper in Manchester called the Manchester Daily Express. It was published five days a week until February 27, 2008. The paper was then published on a weekly basis. Andrew Manuse was the editor; Jody Reese was the publisher. The January 4, 2009, issue was the final issue.

Modelled on free daily commuter papers in larger cities, publisher Jody Reese wrote in a front-page article on the final day of daily production that the paper was unable to generate enough advertisement revenue to support daily publication. The paper also laid off two employees.

The Manchester Express was owned by Quality of Life Publications, the parent company of Hippo Press, which also produces the free arts and entertainment weekly paper, The Hippo, and other local publications.

The Express was printed at the presses of Foster's Daily Democrat. It had a circulation of 12,000 in 2006.

== In popular culture ==
In 2006, Matt Farley included a song about the Hippo Press on the Moes Haven album "September: In Manchvegas".
