= Terra II =

Terra II or Terra 2 may refer to:

- A fictional planet in the Japanese anime series Saber Marionette J
- The second fictional character to be called Terra in DC Comics
- Terra II (game), a play-by-mail game published by Clemens & Associates
- A TV program created and broadcast by TV Cultura, with psychoanalyst Jorge Forbes
