= Magic Spot =

2022 American film by Charles Roxburgh

- Promotional release poster
- Directed by: Charles Roxburgh
- Written by: Matt Farley; Charles Roxburgh
- Produced by: Matt Farley
- Starring: Matt Farley; Kevin McGee
- Cinematography: Charles Roxburgh
- Edited by: Matt Farley
- Music by: Tom Scalzo
- Production company: Motern Media
- Release date: May 2022
- Running time: 87 minutes
- Country: United States
- Language: English

Magic Spot is a 2022 American comedy film directed by Charles Roxburgh, who co-wrote the film with producer and editor Matt Farley. Farley also stars in the film as Walter, who along with his cousin Poopy (Chris Peterson), use a magic rock in the woods that, when stood upon, allows for time travel, to put the soul of their deceased Uncle Dan (Kevin McGee) to rest and rekindle a failed romance.

== Premise ==
Walter Moore is the host of a live public access TV talent show in the fictional New England town of Tussleville. He and his cousin Poopy learn that their Uncle Dan appeared to them as a ghost when they were both children, imparting to them a rhyme about a "Magic Spot" in the town. The Magic Spot is a rock in the local woods that, when stood atop, causes one to travel back in time and observe the past as an incorporeal observer. The Magic Spot can only be used during the winter. Traveling back in time with the Magic Spot causes one to become cold, and one must "acclimate" to the temperature upon returning to the present; Uncle Dan died using the Magic Spot in the summer, as he failed to acclimate and died of hypothermia.

Walter and Poopy seek to retrieve their Uncle Dan from "the beyond", the realm which Magic Spot users travel to and observe, so that his soul can be put to rest. At the same time, Walter uses the Magic Spot in the hopes of rekindling a romance with a woman named Alyssa, who will only allow Walter to take her out on a date on the condition that he remembers what outfit she wore on a date they had two years prior.

== Cast ==
- Matt Farley as Walter Moore
- Kevin McGee as Uncle Dan Port
- Elizabeth M. Peterson as Alyssa Caitlyn Pouliot
- Tom Scalzo as Buster H. McHenry
- Chris Peterson as Poopy McMillen

== Production ==
Magic Spot is one of a number of collaborations between writers Matt Farley and Charles Roxburgh, like Don't Let the Riverbeast Get You! (2012), filmed in Manchester, New Hampshire and released under Farley's production banner of Motern Media. Elizabeth Peterson, who plays Alyssa in Magic Spot, is Farley's wife.

== Release and reception ==
Magic Spot premiered in May 2022, and screened at Fantastic Fest in September 2022 as part of the festival's "Burnt Ends" program.

Brianna Zigler of Paste, writing about Magic Spot and other films produced by Farley and Motern Media, stated: "For what they are, what they’re doing and what they exceedingly accomplish, they are very good movies." Ashley Naftule of the Phoenix New Times gave Magic Spot a positive review, calling it "as much a film about ephemerality and questioning what's worth preserving for future generations as it is about laughing at a guy named Poopy."
