= Torres High School =

Torres High School can refer to:

- Esteban Torres High School (Los Angeles County, California, United States)
- Florentino Torres High School (Manila, Philippines)
