= Renaissance Academy =

Renaissance Academy may refer to one of several schools:

- Crater Renaissance Academy a public high school in Central Point, Oregon.
- East Los Angeles Renaissance Academy (ELARA), a public high school in East Los Angeles, California.
- Highland Park Renaissance Academy, a public K-8 school in Highland Park, Michigan.
- Renaissance Academy (Baltimore), a charter high school in Baltimore, Maryland.
- Renaissance Academy Charter School, a charter K-12 school in Phoenixville, Pennsylvania.
- Renaissance Academy, a Small Learning Community within John Marshall High School (Los Angeles), a public high school in Los Angeles, California.
- Renaissance Academy, an academic program within Albert Einstein High School, a public high school in Kensington, Maryland.
- Renaissance Academy (of Arts, Science and Social Justice), a middle school (grade 6-8) in Alum Rock Union Elementary School District, San Jose, California.
- Renaissance Academy, a special school within Davis School District, Kaysville, Utah.
- Renaissance Public Academy, a former charter school for grades 4–12 in Molalla River School District, Molalla River, Oregon.
- Syracuse Renaissance Academy at Carnegie, an alternative school in Syracuse City School District, Syracuse, New York.
