= Newspaper vending machine =

Vending machine designed to distribute newspapers

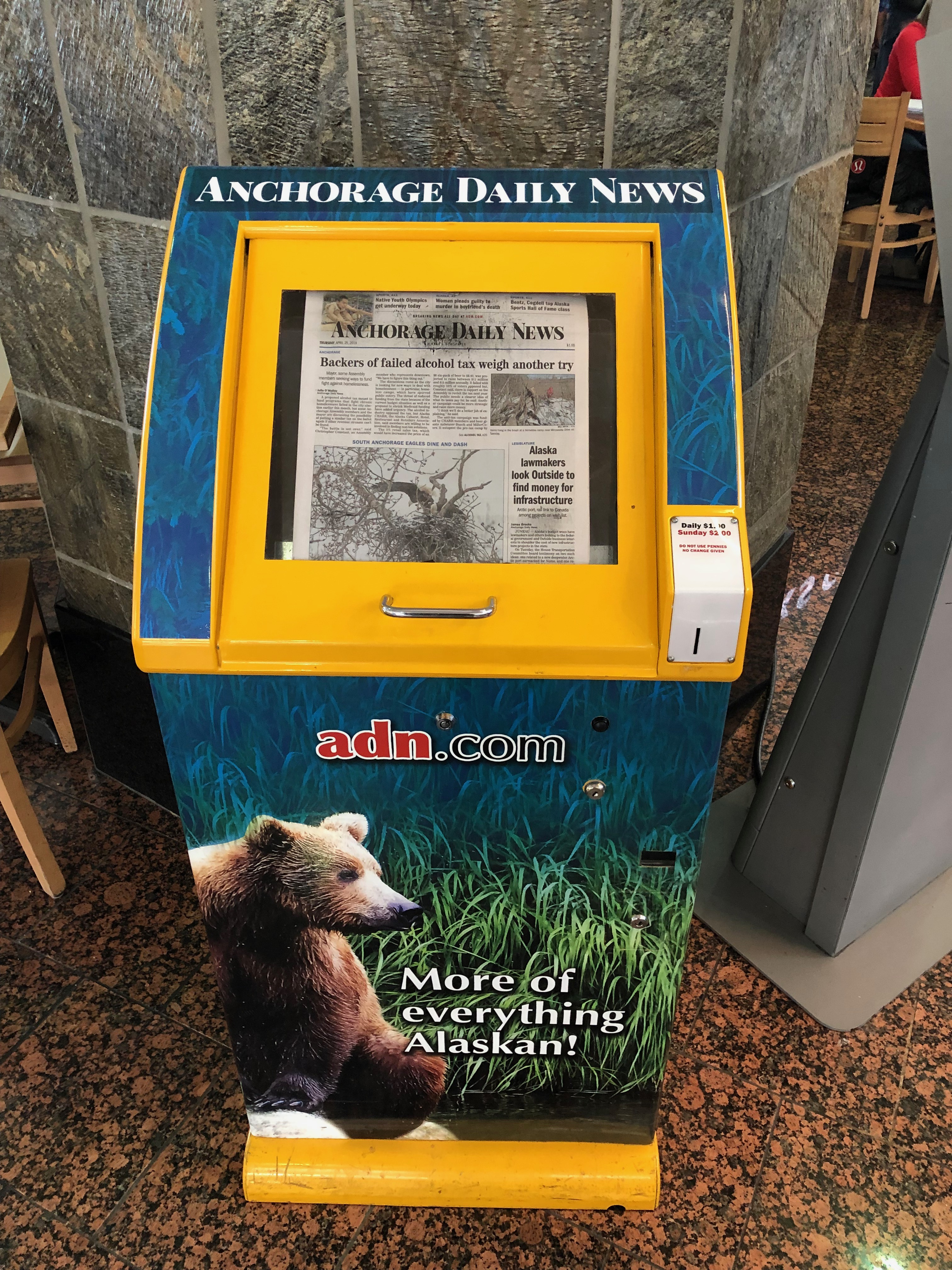
Anchorage Daily News vending machine

A newspaper vending machine or newspaper rack is a vending machine designed to distribute newspapers. Newspaper vending machines are used worldwide, and they are often one of the main distribution methods for newspaper publishers.

According to the Newspaper Association of America, in recent times in the United States, circulation via newspaper vending machines has dropped significantly: in 1996, around 46% of single-sale newspapers were sold in newspaper boxes, and in 2014, only 20% of newspapers were sold in the boxes. It is believed that as of 2025, less than 0.5% of newspapers are now sold out of vending machines.

== History ==
The coin operated newspaper vending machine was invented in 1947 by inventor George Thiemeyer Hemmeter. Hemmeter's company, the Serven Vendor Company, was based in Berkeley, California, and had been making rural mail tubes and honor racks. The new invention could be adjusted to accept coins of different denominations (depending on the cost of the paper sold). The newspaper rack was able to be used with one hand, and took around 30 seconds to dispense a paper. Two models, one with a capacity for 1,250 pages of newsprint, the other 2,500 pages, were brought into production initially. By 1987, over one million machines had been distributed.

One of the most popular newsrack manufacturers is Kaspar, a Shiner, Texas–based wire works company famous for their "Sho-Racks".

The first newspaper machine that accepts Bitcoin as a payment method has been in operation since March 6, 2024. On the left side of the machine there is a display behind a flap that shows a QR code. This code is scanned using a smartphone with a Bitcoin Lightning wallet installed. After successful payment, the user receives a four-digit PIN from the payment server. This PIN is entered into the payment terminal of the newspaper machine via the touch display. Once entered, the flap is unlocked and the newspaper can be removed. The newspaper machine only requires a power supply, for example in the form of a battery, and does not rely on an internet connection.

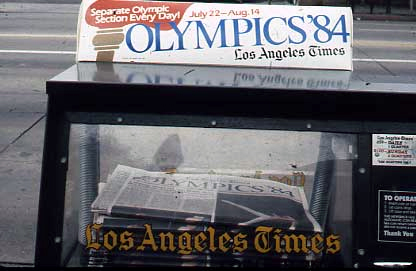
A Los Angeles Times news rack in 1984, with advertising for the 1984 Summer Olympics

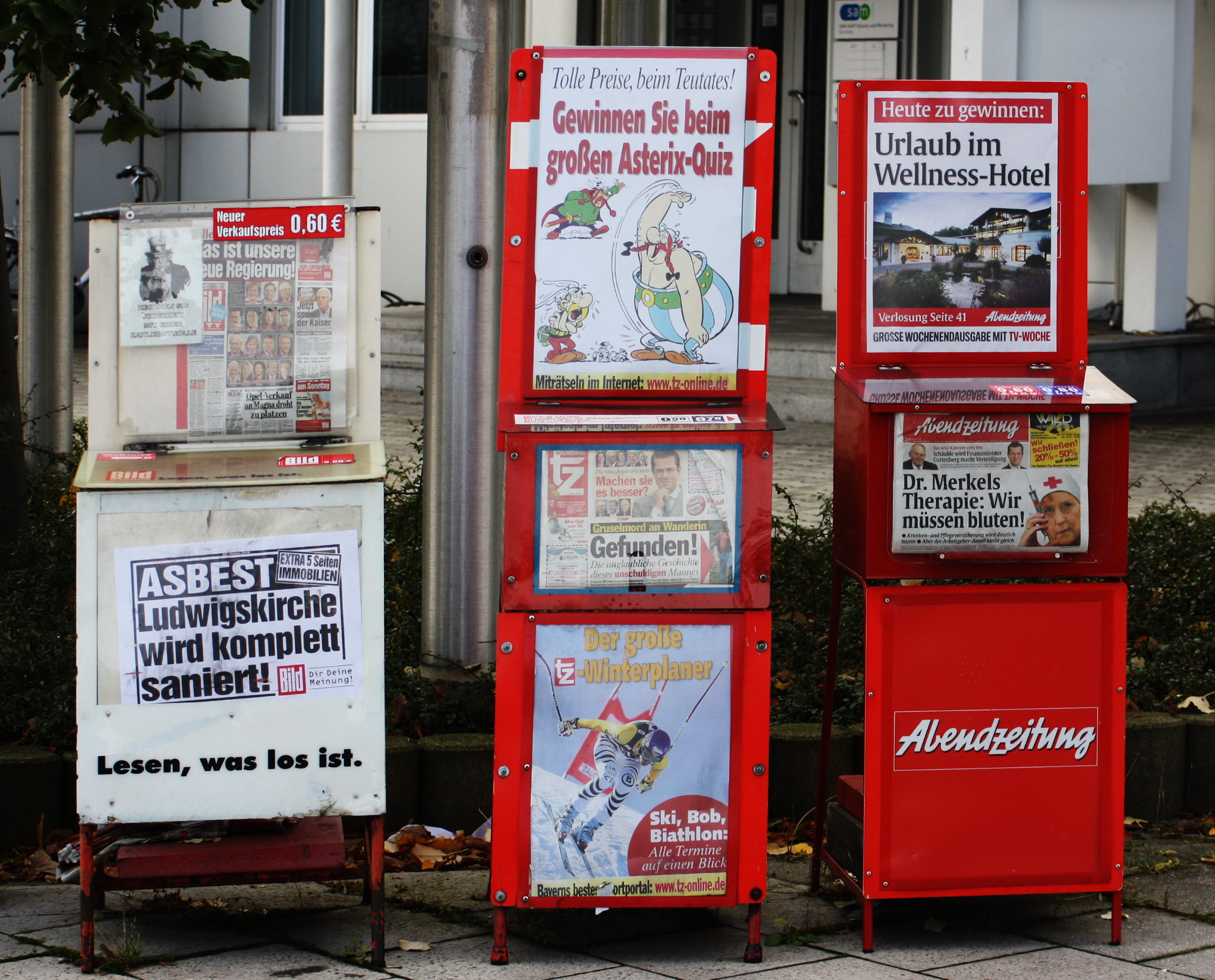
In Munich, Germany, the dispensers for the three local tabloids (depicted) have only transparent plastic lids on top which can be readily opened without inserting a coin - which is, however, demanded. Hence, the sellers have a significant amount of trust in people.

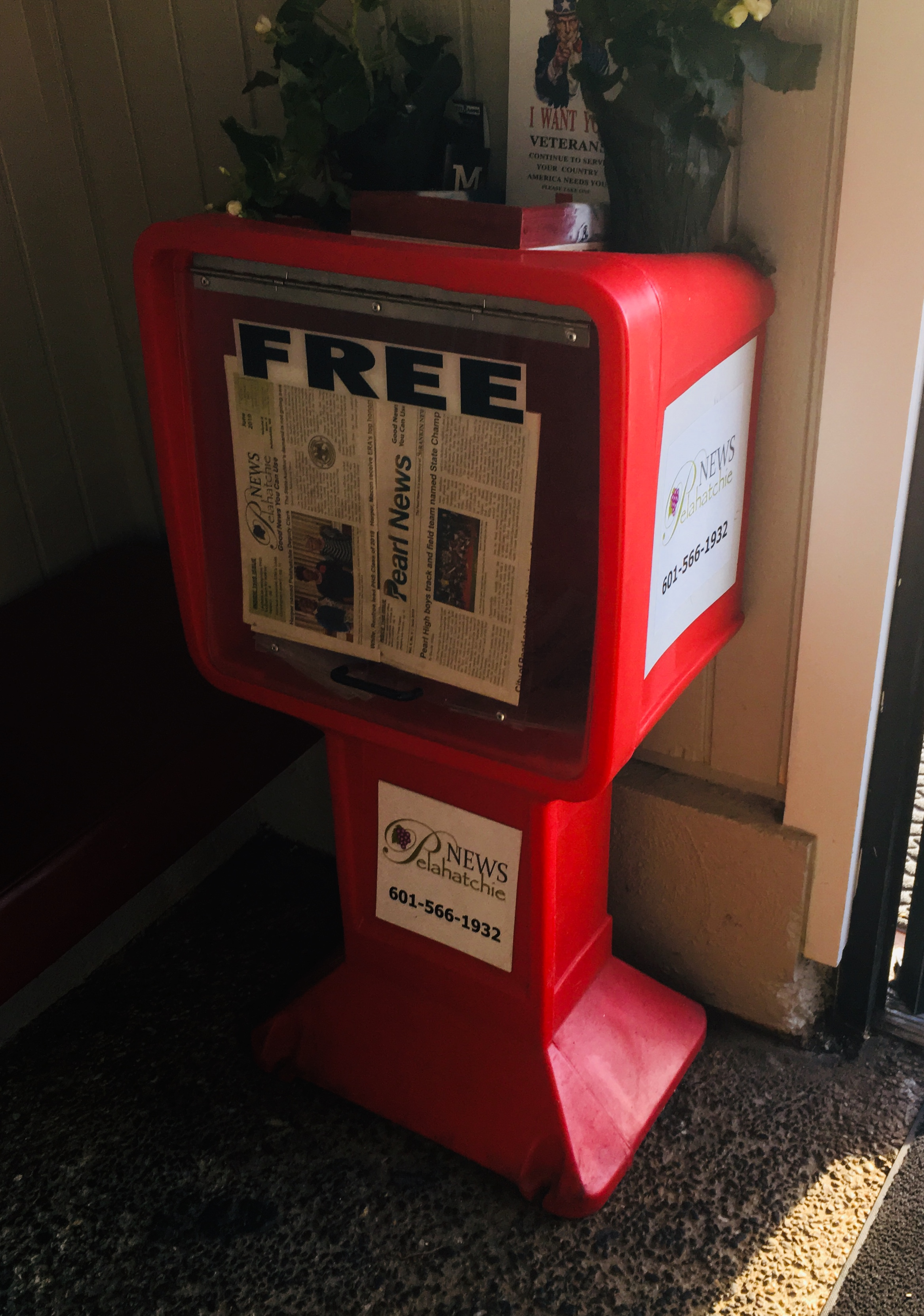
A newspaper vending machine in Mississippi, USA

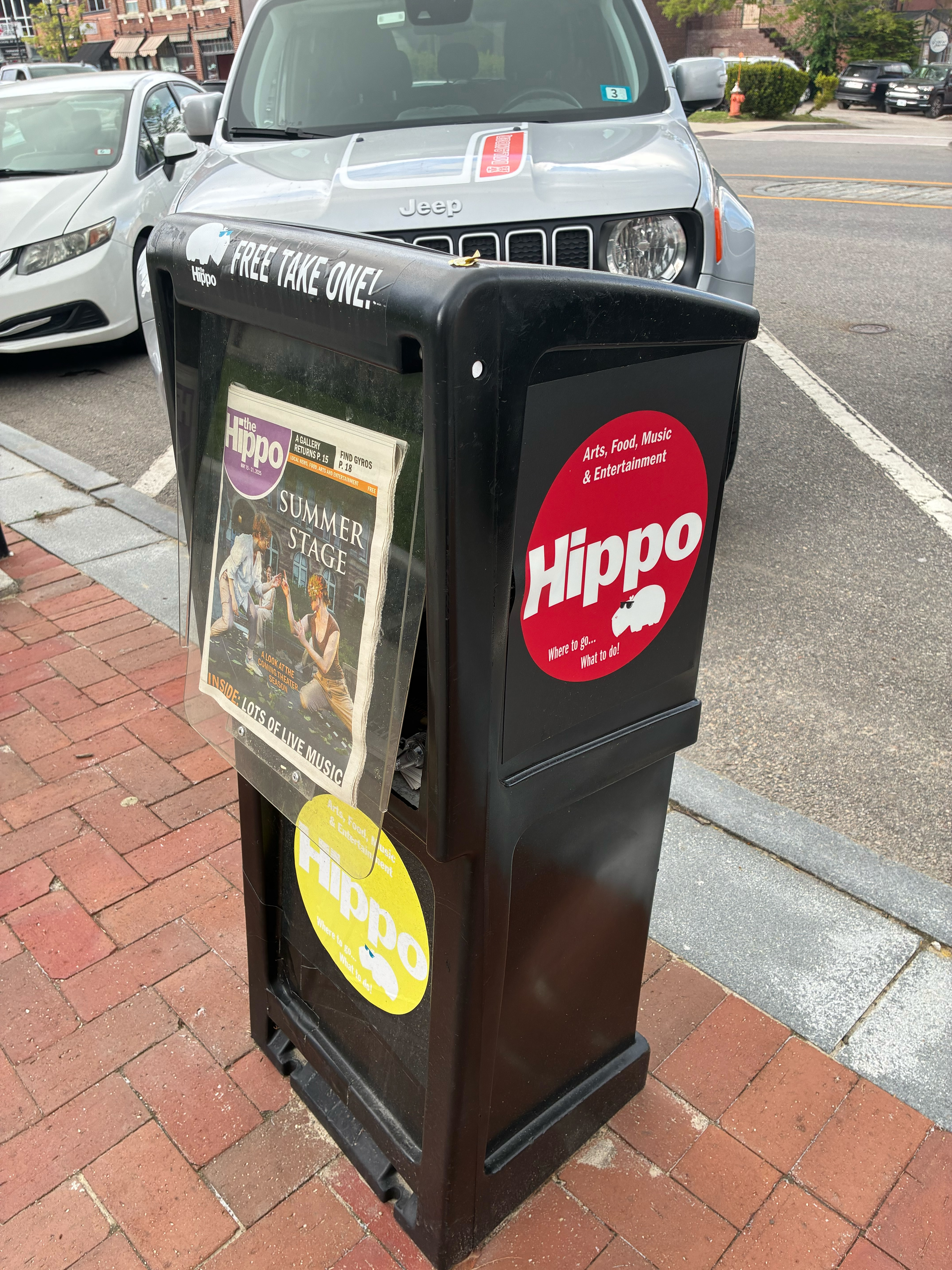
A newspaper vending machine for the Hippo Press in Concord, New Hampshire

=== Legal issues ===
In the United States, publishers have said that the distribution of newspapers by means of street racks is "an essential method of conveying information to the public" and that regulations regarding their placement are an infringement of the First Amendment to the United States Constitution.

In 1983, the city of Lakewood, Ohio adopted an ordinance that gave the mayor of the city complete control of where newspaper racks could be placed, and which newspapers could be placed in them. On June 17, 1988, this ordinance was overturned by the United States Supreme Court in a 4–3 ruling, citing that the ordinance could potentially be used to penalize newspapers that criticize the local government.

=== Re-purposing ===
The newspaper vending machines began to lose popularity as many newspapers switched to online distribution, and as newspaper prices rose; as most vending machines are completely mechanical few of them have paper currency validators, which need some kind of electrical power to work, requiring multiple quarters or dollar coins to be inserted. This is especially true for Sunday newspapers (for example, the Sunday New York Times costing $6 nationally and requiring 24 quarters in a vending machine), which see machines go unfilled by some papers due to the bulk of those editions reducing the number of copies that can possibly be sold. By 2009, various artists and inventors had begun working on re-purposing the boxes.

== See also ==
- Printing press
