= Pat Downey (American football) =

American football player (born 1974)

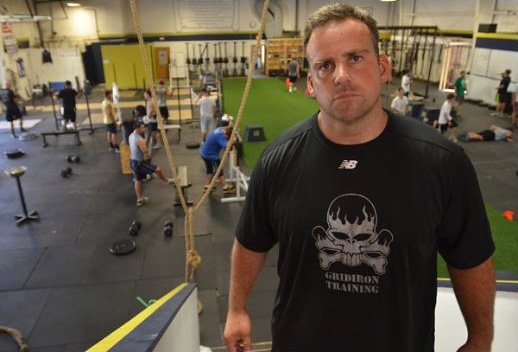

Profile
- Position: Center

Personal information
- Born: June 21, 1974 (age 52); Salem, Massachusetts
- Listed height: 6 ft 2 in (1.88 m)
- Listed weight: 320 lb (145 kg)

Career information
- College: New Hampshire

Career history
- 1998: San Diego Chargers*
- 1999–2001: Nashville Kats
- 2002: Frankfurt Galaxy
- 2002: New England Patriots*
- 2002: Atlanta Falcons*
- 2002: Washington Redskins
- 2004: Colorado Crush
- * Offseason or practice squad member only

Pat Downey (born June 21, 1974) is an American former football center. He played in NFL Europe in 2002 for the Frankfurt Galaxy, where he started at both center and guard, and in the Arena Football League for the Nashville Kats from 1999 to 2001 and the Colorado Crush in 2004. He played college football for the New Hampshire Wildcats.

== Early life, education, and amateur career ==
Downey was born in Salem, Massachusetts, and was a two-sport all-star in football and track & field at Bishop Fenwick High School in Peabody. He was a two-time all-star in football and was named captain of the Harry Agganis All-Star Classic. He also holds the school record in the shot put (53'6") for track & field. Downey did a postgraduate year at Worcester Academy, where he was named MVP of the 1992 Hilltoppers football team as a center. Downey received a full athletic scholarship to play college football at the University of New Hampshire, a national powerhouse Division I-AA program. At UNH, Downey was named team captain in 1997 and was a two-time All-Star. He was named First-team All-Atlantic 10, First-team All-East and First-team All-New England for the Wildcats.

== Professional career ==
Downey was signed by the San Diego Chargers in 1998 as an undrafted free agent, but was cut prior to training camp for salary cap reasons.

Downey played for the Nashville Kats of the Arena Football League from 1999 to 2001, including Arena Bowl appearances in 2000 and 2001.

In 2002, Downey played for the Frankfurt Galaxy of NFL Europe before being injured midseason. He then spent training camp with the New England Patriots.

Downey was on the 53-man roster of the Washington Redskins in 2002. He also attended training camp with Washington in 2003.

Downey signed with the Colorado Crush of the Arena Football League in October 2003, and played for the team the following season, his last as a professional player.

== Post-playing career ==
Downey was named offensive/defensive line coach of the Arena Football League's Philadelphia Soul in 2005, and coached for the team in 2006 and 2007. He then became an associate head coach of the Columbus Destroyers before the league folded in 2008.

Along with working for the athletic training firm The Program, Downey started a business called Gridiron Training in June 2009.

== Personal life ==
Downey has three children with his wife Andrea. As of 2009, they lived in Swampscott, Massachusetts.
