= Bob Rowe (musician) =

American singer

Robert J. "Bob" Rowe (born September 21, 1954 in Battle Creek, Michigan) is an American musical performer and recording artist. He is well known for bringing music to residents of long term care facilities. Rowe founded the nonprofit Renaissance Enterprises in 1988 for the benefit of residents of nursing homes, VA hospitals, and similar facilities. Since then, he has devoted much of his life to bringing live music to the residents.

In 2006, he received the Mother Teresa Award, sponsored by the St. Bernadette Institute of Sacred Art. The award was for his role as American friend of the elderly, especially in the field of music.

== Biography ==
Rowe began his career singing in local clubs and coffee houses in Chicago, Detroit, New York, Milwaukee, and other cities throughout the United States and Canada. In the late 1970s and early 1980s, he began to concentrate on performances for "special" groups and audiences, such as the developmentally disabled, visually impaired, and the elderly. His music was inspired (and mentored) by Judy Collins, Joan Baez, and Peter, Paul and Mary.

== Activism ==
Rowe founded the nonprofit Renaissance Enterprises in 1988 for the benefit of residents of nursing homes, VA hospitals, and similar facilities. For a decade, Rowe maintained a correspondence with Mother Teresa about his work and sought her advice.

In 1994, Teresa wrote: "Your work of love in nursing homes, hospitals and for the aged, the neglected and the forgotten is truly the work of peace, for the fruit of love is service and the fruit of service is peace. Works of love like yours bring one face to face with God. Continue to use music to make the presence of God - His love and compassion better known to those in need - His little ones who have forgotten to smile. My prayer is with you in a special way and also with all connected with Renaissance Enterprises."

Rowe published a booklet on the Renaissance web page providing guidance for artists when serving this audience.

== Awards and recognition ==
Recognition for his work has come from organizations including the Giraffe Heroes Project award (1996) for sticking his neck out. He was also noted in 1997 by Time magazine as a "local hero".

Other recognition includes:

- Mother Teresa Award, sponsored by the St. Bernadette Institute of Sacred Art (as noted above).
- Community Medal for Arts, awarded to Rowe in 2015 by the Arts Council of Greater Kalamazoo (Michigan).
- New Song Online Ministries recognition.
- World Poetry Contest: Rowe was the winner for 2000 with his poems "Don't be Afraid" and "The Window".
- United Catholic Music and Video Association "Inspiration Award."
- Time magazine, May 5, 1997 recognized Bob as a "local hero." They wrote: "In his teens, before he became a professional musician, Rowe visited nursing home to perform for the residents. In 1988 he established a nonprofit organization for musicians and artists who travel across the country providing entertainment as therapy to people living in nursing homes and other health-care facilities. Singing to these people, says Rowe, allows him to use his music as an 'instrument of healing.'"
- Familyland Television Network Christmas Special, with Rowe as their lead artist.
- Weekly Reader magazine recognized Rowe in February, 1997, as a "hero."

== Discography ==
His recordings include 21 albums from 1974 to 2010. His work includes folk and country music, Irish ballads, and standards. Proceeds from sales of many of his recordings go directly to the work of Renaissance Enterprises.

- Legacy (2010), September/Heartbeat
- Loving You-Sacred Folk Songs (2012)
- When October Goes (2006) CD, September
- Christmas is Here (2003) CD, September
- Healer of the Universe (2001) CD, September/Heartbeat
- Tom Thumb's Blues - Tribute to Judy Collins (2000) CD, September
- Celebration (1998) CD, Revolution/Heartbeat
- Christmas Bells (1997) CD, Revolution/TNR
- Portraits (1997) CD, Revolution/Heartbeat
- Coming Home Again (1996) CD, Revolution
- We Are One (1996) CD, Revolution/Heartbeat
- One Heart (1994) CD, September
- Love Song (1994) Cassette, September
- A Christmas Song (1991) Cassette, September
- From The Heart (1989), Cassette, Renaissance,
- Bless The Lord (1988) Cassette, Resource Pub.
- We Are One (1987) Cassette, Resource Publications
- You & Me (1985) Cassette, September
- A New Beginning (1981) LP, World Library
- "Don't Let It End Like This" (1978) Single
- "Love IS All That Matters" (1974) Single, Venture

== Other published works ==
- Loving and Caring for One Another (current, on line)
- We Are One Songbook (1999)
- Bless the Lord Songbook (1989)
- We Are One Songbook (1987)
- The Best of All Seasons (Poetry) (1984)
- A New Beginning (Songbook) (1984)
- People's Mass Book (1983)

== Media appearances ==
Rowe's numerous media appearances include his Christmas special for Familyland Television (2005) and appearances on Sirius and XM radio. Others appearances include:

- TCT Network (2005)
- Skyangel Network (2005)
- XM Satellite Radio Christmas Specials (2003,4)
- PBS Short Documentary (1998)
- TBN (1998)
- Kalamazoo Lively Arts (2003)
- Eternal Word TV (1997,8)

== Other sources ==
- "The Catholic Jukebox". 22 April 2006. Archived from the original on 2006-04-22.
- "HeartBeatRecords.Com - Bob Rowe". 31 October 2006. Archived from the original on 2006-10-31.
- Carlson, Chuck. "Bob Rowe still loves to sing his songs". Battle Creek Enquirer.
- "Catholic Digest Magazine". Catholic Digest. Archived from the original on 28 June 2013.
