= Renaissance Charter School =

Renaissance Charter School may refer to the following schools in the United States:

- Boston Renaissance Charter Public School in Hyde Park, Boston, Massachusetts
- Renaissance Charter School (Queens), Jackson Heights, Queens, New York City
- Renaissance Elementary and Middle Charter School, in Doral, Florida
- Renaissance Charter Schools at Pines, Pembroke Pines, Florida
- Renaissance Charter School at Hunter's Creek, Hunter's Creek, Florida
- Renaissance Charter School at Poinciana K-8, Osceola County, Florida
- Renaissance Charter School at Tapestry K-8, Kissimmee, Florida
- Renaissance Charter School at Crown Point, Ocoee, Florida
- Renaissance Charter School at Goldenrod K-8, Orlando, Florida

== See also ==
- Renaissance (disambiguation)#Schools
