= Recon (disambiguation) =

Recon, or reconnaissance, is a military term for gathering information.

Recon may also refer to:

== Arts and entertainment ==
- "Recon" (Lost), a TV episode
- Recon (role-playing game), 1982–1984
- Recon (band), an American Christian metal band
- Recon, a short film by Breck Eisner, starring Peter Gabriel
- Recon CS-6, a 2006 Nerf Blaster

== Other uses ==
- Recon Instruments, a Canadian technology company
- River, Estuary and Coastal Observing Network, a waterway observing system in North America
- Recon (app), an online dating service for gay men
- Jeep Recon, an electric sport utility vehicle

== See also ==
- Recce (disambiguation)
- Tom Clancy's Ghost Recon, a series of tactical shooter video games
- Halo 3: Recon, a standalone expansion for the video game Halo 3
