= Bishop Fenwick High School (Peabody, Massachusetts) =

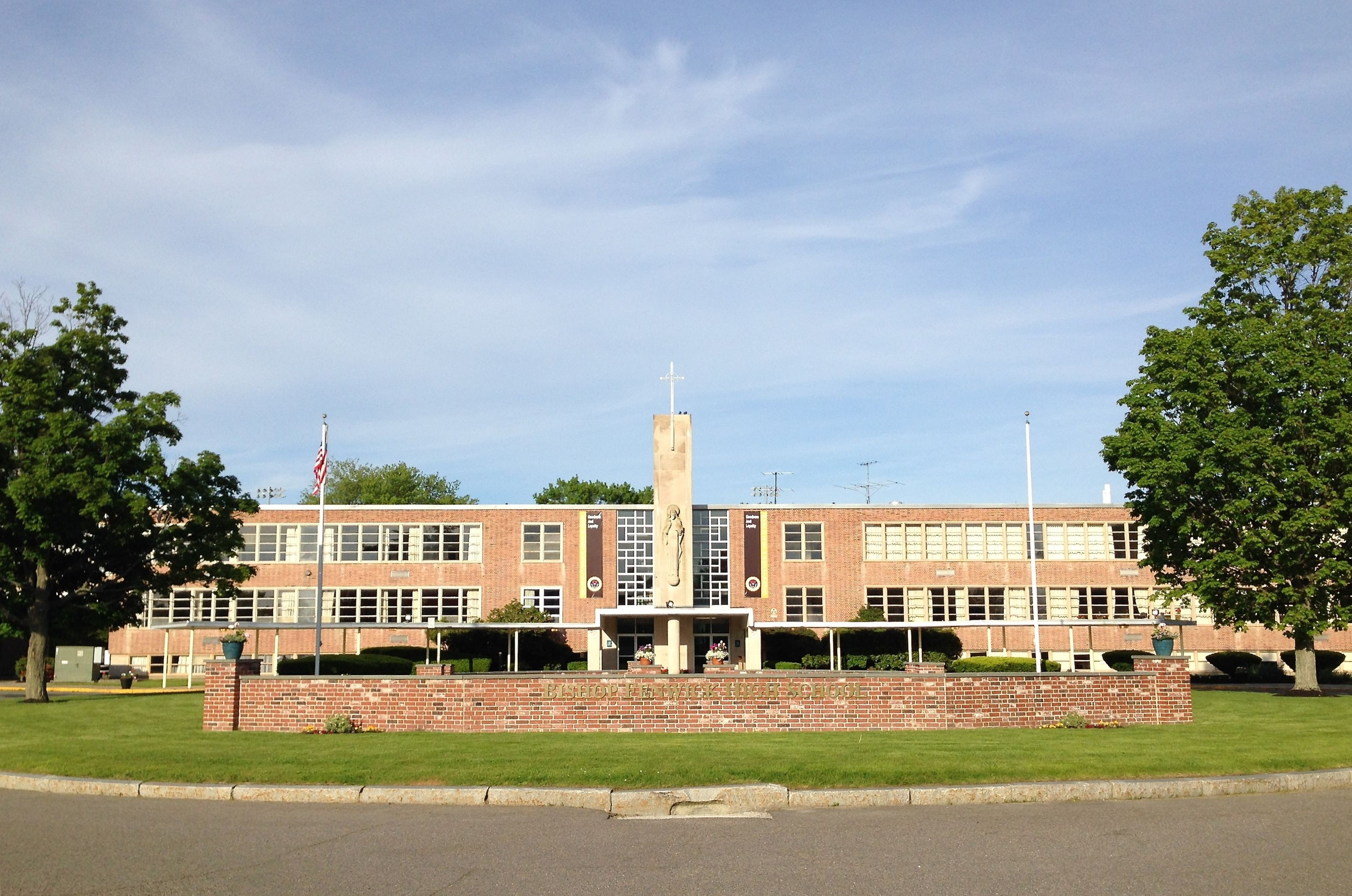

Location
- 99 Margin Street; Peabody, (Essex County), Massachusetts 01960; United States; 42°32′23.14″N 70°55′5.58″W

Information
- Type: Private, Coeducational
- Motto: "Bonitas et Fidelitas" (goodness and fidelity)
- Religious affiliation: Roman Catholic
- Established: 1959
- President: Thomas Nunan
- Principal: Christopher Canniff
- Faculty: 46.0 (on an FTE basis)
- Grades: 9–12
- Enrollment: 582 (2017–18)
- Student to teacher ratio: 20 to 1
- Campus size: 59 acres (240,000 m^{2})
- Colors: Black and Gold
- Athletics conference: Catholic Central League
- Mascot: Crusader
- Accreditation: New England Association of Schools and Colleges
- Newspaper: The Fenwickian
- Website: http://www.fenwick.org

Bishop Fenwick High School (better known simply as "Fenwick") is a private Roman Catholic high school in Peabody, Massachusetts. It is named after Boston bishop Benedict Joseph Fenwick, the founder of the College of the Holy Cross.

While located in the Roman Catholic Archdiocese of Boston, the school is operated independently and with the blessing of the Archdiocese. Students who attend Bishop Fenwick come from over 40 towns and communities in New England, primarily those closest to the campus such as Saugus, Salem, Peabody, Beverly, Marblehead, and Danvers, Massachusetts. The school also has a small number of international students, having welcomed its first international students in 2014.

== History ==
Bishop Fenwick High School was founded in 1959 by the late Cardinal Richard Cushing and was named for the second bishop of Boston, Benedict Joseph Fenwick, S.J. The school was the first coeducational Catholic high school on Boston's North Shore and was staffed by the Sisters of Notre Dame de Namur. In 2003, the Archdiocese of Boston relinquished control of its "Central High Schools," including Fenwick, in response to financial difficulties in the wake of the child sex abuse scandal. The Archdiocese still owns the property and is involved in school governance, making appointments to the board of trustees; for that reason it is not considered truly independent. It is, however, financially independent of the umbrella of the archdiocese of Boston.

As of the 2018-19 school year, it was one of the ten largest coeducational high schools in the Archdiocese of Boston, with a student body of 565.

In the summer of 2018, it was announced that Fenwick will assume sponsorship of St. Mary of the Annunciation School in Danvers, Massachusetts.

== Athletics ==
Bishop Fenwick's Crusaders have athletic programs in 26 interscholastic sports at a variety of levels, primarily competing in the Boston area's Catholic Central League.

In August 2023, the school was banned from MIAA sports based competitions for the 2023-2024 school year.

== Tuition ==
Tuition for the 2023-2024 academic year is $19,750.

== Notable alumni ==
- Frederick Berry, disability rights advocate and member of Massachusetts senate
- Pat Downey, football player
- Matt Farley, musician and film-maker
- Alex Newell, actor and singer
- Ashley Phillips, soccer player
- Sonja Santelises, school district administrator
