= George Thiemeyer Hemmeter =

American inventor

George Thiemeyer Hemmeter (1906 – April 8, 2000) was an American inventor primarily known for inventing the Newspaper vending machine. He also worked on other ideas for devices such as a food dehydrator used during the second world war, and a self-balancing washing machine.
