= American Renaissance (disambiguation) =

American Renaissance is the period from 1876 to 1917 in American architecture and arts, characterized by renewed national self-confidence and a feeling that the United States was the heir to Greek democracy, Roman law, and Renaissance humanism.

American Renaissance may also refer to:

- American Renaissance (literature), period in American literature running from about 1830 to around the Civil War
- American Renaissance (magazine), a monthly white supremacist online publication founded and edited by Jared Taylor and published by the New Century Foundation
- American Renaissance: Art and Expression in the Age of Emerson and Whitman, a 1941 book published by F. O. Matthiessen
- Native American Renaissance, term originally coined by critic Kenneth Lincoln to categorise the significant increase in production of literary works by Native Americans in the United States in the late 1960s and onwards

== See also ==
- Renaissance (disambiguation)
