= Reconnaissance (disambiguation) =

Reconnaissance is the exploration of an area by military forces to obtain information.

Reconnaissance may also refer to:

- Reconnaissance (rallying), observation of racetrack prior to rally motorsport races
- Reconnaissance, a 2015 poetry collection by Carl Phillips

== See also ==
- Recce (disambiguation)
- Renaissance (disambiguation)
- Intelligence, surveillance, target acquisition, and reconnaissance
- Surveillance, monitoring for the purpose of information gathering
- Vulnerability scanner, a computer program designed to assess computers for known weaknesses
- Reconnaissance aircraft, an aircraft used for reconnaissance.
