= Renaissance (Soweto String Quartet album) =

1996 studio album by the Soweto String Quartet

Studio album by Soweto String Quartet
- Released: October 1996
- Recorded: 1996
- Genre: Classical; African pop; folk; worldbeat
- Length: 41:22
- Label: BMG
- Producer: Grahame Beggs

Soweto String Quartet chronology
Zebra Crossing (1994)	Renaissance (1996)	Millennia (1998)

Renaissance is the second studio album by the South African quartet the Soweto String Quartet, released in October 1996 by BMG Records. It follows the national and international success of their debut album Zebra Crossing (1994), and was produced by Grahame Beggs. As with their previous album, Renaissance blends classical music with African pop and folk music, while also exploring new textures, with styles on the album including marabi, kwela and worldbeat. Quartet member Reuben Khemse described the album's themes as reawakening, revival and the dawn of new eras.

The album received commercial success, reaching number 8 in New Zealand. Put together, Zebra Crossing and Renaissance have sold a total of some 400,000 copies. The band toured internationally in promotion of the album in 1997, during which it was released by RCA Victor in the United States. Critical acclaim generally greeted the album with critics complimenting the quartet's unusual sound. At the 1997 South African Music Awards, Renaissance won the award for "Best Instrumental Performance," while Graeme Beggs won the award for "Best Producer."

== Background ==
The members of the Soweto String Quartet, consisting of the three Khamese brothers, alongside their friend, Makhosini Mguni, formed in the early 1980s. Finding escape from their apartheid-imposed poverty, brothers Reuben and Sandile Khemese studied classical music in their native Soweto and later in England, and returning to their township, they formed the Soweto String Quartet with their brother Thami and friend Makhosini Mguni in the early 1980s. It was not until 1992 that the band became a full-time professional ensemble, and their 'big break' came when producer Grahame Beggs, who worked for BMG Records, saw the quartet perform on TV and during their nine-month residency at the Sun City resort, Beggs signed them to the BMG Africa label, who released their debut album Zebra Crossing in 1994. In their native South Africa, Zebra Crossing sold some 50,000 copies and went Platinum.

The success of Zebra Crossing ensured international demand for the quartet's live performances, and also saw the band win "Best New Artist," "Best Instrumental Performance" and "Best Pop Album," a combination one critic called "truly rare," at the FNB South African Music Awards. The album's release in the United Kingdom by BMG in April 1996 and later on that year in the United States by RCA Victor secured the band an international audience. In 1996, the quartet recorded the album's follow-up, Renaissance, again fusing European classical chamber music with bittersweet lyricism and "lithe rhythms of South Africa’s Township Jive." Beggs returned as producer, while Richard Mitchell recorded and mixed the record.

== Composition ==
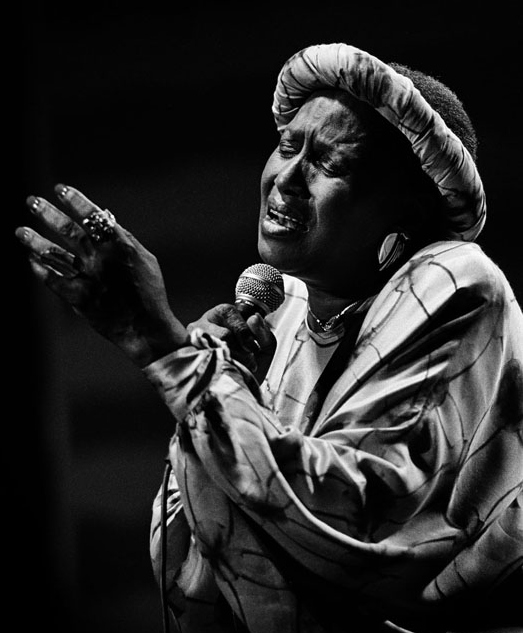
The album includes a cover of Miriam Makeba's "Pata Pata"

Renaissance mixes classical arrangements with African pop music. In the album's weaving elements of pop music into classical music, the quartet dabble in styles such as marabi, kwela, African folk music, as well as an array of indigenous African songs. The Beat felt the album provides an "original interpretation of South African song," an opinion echoed by Jazz Times who felt the numerous South African folk songs on Renaissance are arranged as worldbeat fusions. Classic CD magazine felt that the album shows the quartet developing further in the direction of "crossover international pop." While the classical and pop-crossover elements are a continuation of their approach from Zebra Crossing, producer Grahame Beggs helps the band introduce new textures to the album. Quartet member Reuben Khemse described the themes of the album as reawakening and the dawn of a new era. He said:

"Renaissance is a very important album to us because it has a message. It's about a new era, about reawakening, revival. We say there's hope, that song and dance can create harmony and be a buffer against any form of conflict. Even William Shakespeare warned about men with no music in their hearts."

While the album includes South African standards such as "Imbube" and Miriam Makeba's "Pata Pata," it also includes an original composition, "Writing on the Wall". "Imbube" features interlocking violins which explore the track's "various nuances," while "Songs My Mother Taught Me" is an atmospheric work written in 1880 by Antonín Dvořák. The quartet's rendition of Makeba's popular "Pata Pata" reflects what the quartet's violinist Makhosini described as their owing a "debt of gratitude to the pioneers of South African popular music." They spoke of their appreciation towards Miriam Makeba, Letta Mbulu, Hugh Masekela, Caiphus Semenya and "others whose music had to be smuggled into South Africa while they lived in exile during the apartheid era."

South African musician Vusi Mahlasela performs guest vocals on "Weeping," a protest song written by Dan Heymann, a young white soldier in the South African Army who was horrified with the apartheid system. The lyrics include the lines "I knew a man who lived in fear. It was huge, it was angry, it was drawing near. Behind his house, a secret place was the shadow of a demon he could never face." The inclusion of a guest vocalist marks another departure for the quartet. The song was originally recorded by Heymann with the group Bright Blue in 1987, and was named the "All-time favorite South African Song" by the readers of the South African Rock Encyclopedia in 1999.

== Release ==
Renaissance was first released in October 1996 by BMG Africa. BMG also issued the album in the UK, whereas in the US it was released by RCA Victor in 1997. Building upon the far-reaching success of their previous album, Renaissance brought larger international audiences to the quartet. Following the release of the album, the quartet were invited to perform in Spain in April 1997, followed by a tour of France, Sweden, Norway, Denmark, Australia and New Zealand. Reuben noted in 1997: "We'd like to do a national tour of South Africa late this year after fulfilling our commitments abroad." To represent South Africa, the Soweto String Quartet played a "Commonwealth In Concert" show in Edinburgh, Scotland in 1997, and then followed it with a show in London to showcase material from Renaissance.

== Reception ==
Professional ratings
Review scores
Source	Rating
AllMusic	4/5 stars

Renaissance was a relative commercial success. It reached number 8 on the Official New Zealand Music Chart, and put together, Zebra Crossing and Renaissance have sold a total of some 400,000 copies. Renaissance also received generally favourable reviews from critics. African magazine Drum noted how the album was "causing a stir" in the region's music scene. Among international reviews, AllMusic named Renaissance an "Album Pick" and rated it four stars out of five. Arthur Goldstuck of Billboard said that Renaissance enhances upon the successful "classical and pop-crossover elements" of Zebra Crossing, complimenting the addition of "new textures" achieved with help from Grahame Beggs.

Pace magazine was favourable, noting how the quartet weave "elements of pop into staid classical music" and felt that the quartet have "internationalised local roots music and made it accessible to lovers of classical music." The Beat wrote that Renaissance provides "a totally original interpretation of South African song." He felt the mix of "classical arrangements with pop fusions" could sometimes be disconcerting, but nonetheless said "there is no doubt that SSQ achieves moments of clear beauty in its effort clear beauty in its effort to transcend the classical quartet structure." John Murph of Jazz Times was generally unfavourable, finding the album to amount to "pre-fab piffle" suited for "jazzy" radio stations and "weather channel background music," and criticised how the "[t]he collections of various South African folk songs are filtered through gooey global-beat fusion." He did however praise "Weeping" for its vocals, which he felt were reminiscent of Peter Gabriel's worldbeat albums. At the 1997 South African Music Awards, Renaissance won the award for "Best Instrumental Performance," while Graeme Beggs won the award for "Best Producer."

== Track listing ==
1. "Imbube" – 4:47
2. "Writing On The Wall" – 4:16
3. "Songs My Mother Taught Me" – 2:23
4. "Weeping" – 5:40
5. "Eureka" – 3:35
6. "Thula Sizwe Khay'elisha" – 1:54
7. "Pata Pata" – 4:07
8. "Mangwane/Ee'Motswala" – 1:56
9. "Sikelela" – 4:03
10. "Sophiatown" – 2:11
11. "My Lover (Isithandwa Sam)" – 2:27
12. "Blue Fountain" – 2:57
13. "Imbube (Reprise)" – 1:06

== Personnel ==
- Grahame Beggs – production
- Richard Mitchell – recording and mixing
- Kenta Mpahlwa – assistant to Mitchell
- Simon Heyworth – mastering (Chop em Out Studios, London)
- Nicky Kaminski – sleeve design
- Claude Jardine – design
- Paul Chedlow – band photography

== Charts ==
Chart performance for Renaissance
Chart (1997)	Peak position
Australian Albums (ARIA)	29
New Zealand Albums (RMNZ)	8
