= Recce (disambiguation) =

Recce /ˈrɛkiː/, or reconnaissance, refers to military scouting.

Recce may also refer to:

- Recce (filmmaking), a pre-shoot reconnaissance of a film location
- SEAL Recon Rifle, nicknamed the Recce
- South African Special Forces Brigade, nicknamed the Recces
- Recce (web series), an Indian Telugu-language crime thriller series

== See also ==
- Reconnaissance (disambiguation)
- Recon (disambiguation)
- Reece (disambiguation)
