= Renaissance (game) =

Play-by-mail fantasy game

- Publishers: Constantine Xanthos
- Years active: 1983 to current
- Genres: role-playing, play-by-mail
- Languages: English
- Playing time: unlimited
- Materials required: Instructions, order sheets, turn results, paper, pencil
- Media type: Play-by-mail or email
- Website: suspense-and-decision.com/index/

Renaissance is a historical, roleplaying play-by-mail (PBM) game.

== History and development ==
Renaissance is a hand moderated, play-by-mail game. Gameplay is open-ended. Constantine Xanthos of Hillsboro, FL published the game in 1983. Renaissance was "The only true historical role playing game on the market" as of 1983. Game turnaround times were monthly as of the early 1990s.

In September 1991, the publisher released Renaissance II, a fully computer-moderated update. As of January 2023, the game is still active.

== Gameplay ==
The setting is the late 15th century, with games starting in 1495 and turns lasting one month of game time. Roleplay involves members of Renaissance families. The game features thousands of cities. Elements of gameplay include exploration, economics, and combat.

== Reception ==
A reviewer in a 1987 issue of The Postal Warrior stated that, "Renaissance is not a game for everyone. It has problems which you, the player, must be prepared to tolerate. However, if you are interested in history, and you'd like to be part of it, then playing Renaissance can be most rewarding!" Another reviewer in 1987 called it "fascinating, enjoyable, and mind-boggling at times," as well as "addicting".

== Reviews ==
- 1986 Games 100

== See also ==
- Aegyptus (game)
- List of play-by-mail games
- Terra II (game)

== Bibliography ==
- Alexander, Mark (June 1987). "Playing Renaissance: Another Advisor's View". The Postal Warrior. No. 2. pp. 21–22.
- Constantine Xanthos (September–October 1991). "Renaissance: The Historical Simulation by Constantine Xanthos". Paper Mayhem. No. 50. p. 25.
- de la Pena, Temis (February 1987). "Playing Renaissance". The Postal Warrior. No. 1. pp. 10–13.
- Dunne, Bill (Autumn 1984). "Renaissance – The Times They Are A-changin'". Flagship. No. 4. pp. 12–14.
- Editors (November–December 1983). "Gamealog: Renaissance". American Gamer. No. 1. p. 30.
- Muir, John C. (September–October 1991). "Renaissance: Open to the Public". Paper Mayhem. No. 50. pp. 23–26.
- Zachary, Raven (2022). "The Suspense & Decision Games Index". Suspense & Decision. Archived from the original on June 10, 2021.
