= Renaissance Academy (Baltimore, Maryland) =

High school in Baltimore, Maryland, United States

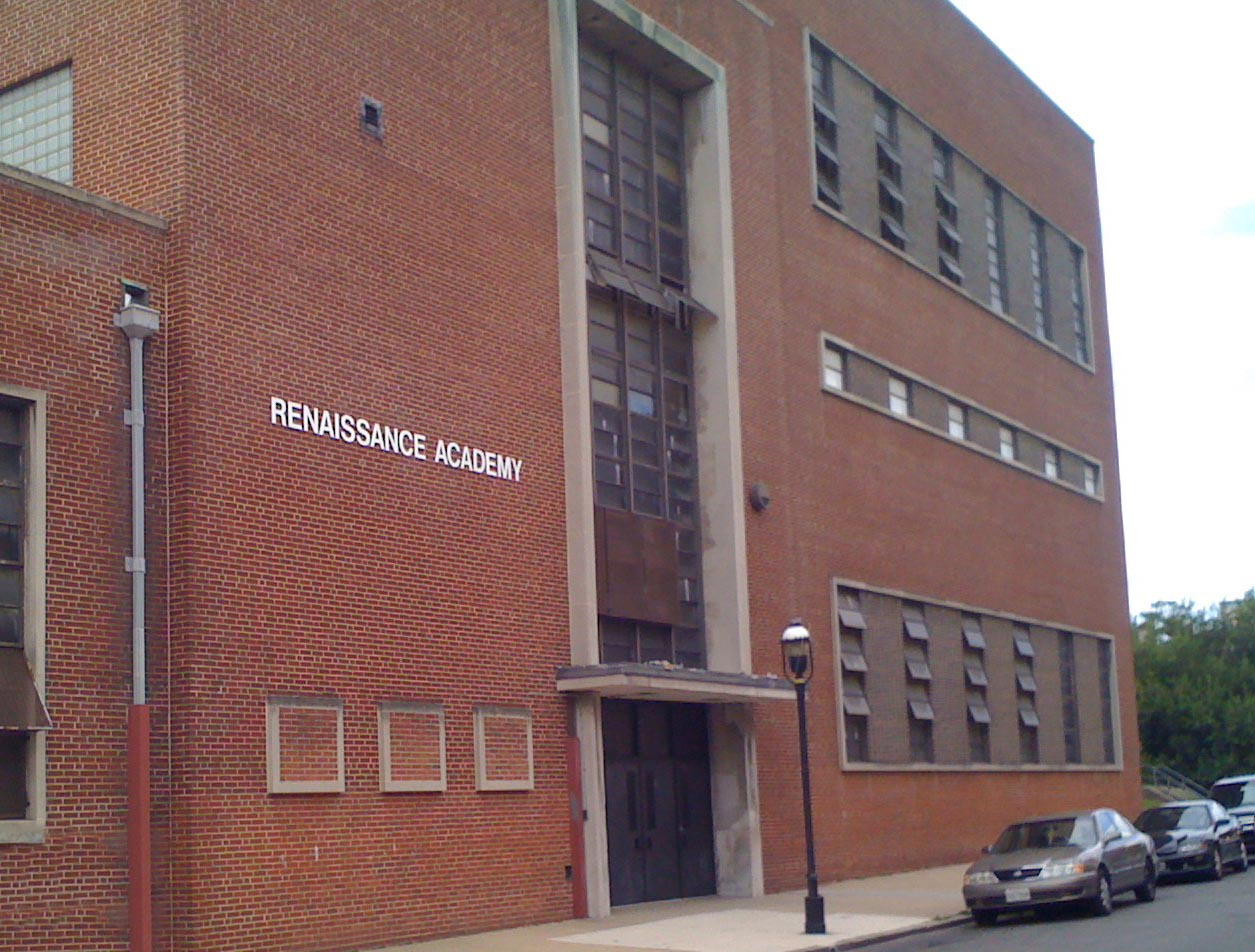

Location
- 1301 McCulloh Street; Baltimore, Maryland 21217; 39°18′11″N 76°37′40″W

Information
- School type: Public
- Founded: 2005
- School district: Baltimore City Public Schools
- Superintendent: Dr. Sonja Brookins Santelises [CEO]
- School number: 433
- Principal: Tammatha Woodhouse
- Grades: 9-12
- Enrollment: 245 (2018)
- Area: Urban
- Mascot: Rams

Renaissance Academy is a public high school in the Madison Park neighborhood of Baltimore, Maryland, United States. The school is part of the Baltimore City Public Schools (BCPSS) system.

== Administration ==
Principal Nikkia Rowe was appointed to lead the school in July 2013. Principal Rowe made national headlines in 2015 for her response to the 2015 Baltimore protests which followed the Death of Freddie Gray. Gray was arrested only 1.3 miles away from Renaissance. Rowe instituted new curricula in law and homeland security in the hopes of building a more civic-minded student population. In spring of 2015, Rowe also instituted a mentorship program, Seeds of Promise, which brought young adult men from the community into the school to attempt to connect with disengaged students.

Principal Rowe was replaced by Tammatha Woodhouse, former principal of Excel Academy at Francis M. Wood High School in West Baltimore's Poppleton neighborhood in July 2018. Rowe's firing came among concerns by City Schools administrators in regards to falling attendance and graduation rates. Rowe, however, told media that she was terminated due to a failure to resubmit her certification. Rowe's departure led to community fears that it was the preliminary step to the closure of the school.

In 2018, incoming principal Tammatha Woodhouse announced her intention to dramatically increase enrollment to 400 (from 242 in August 2018), and to add organized sports to the school's programming.

== Potential moves and closure ==
Renaissance Academy has been repeatedly reviewed by Baltimore City Schools for closure or relocation.

Initially based in the campus of the former Southwestern Senior High School, City Schools officials first began proposing moving Renaissance to the sites of Harlem Park Middle or Edmondson-Westside High School. The response to the proposal from the public was hostile, with complaints about lack of community involvement, longer commutes and a perception of more dangerous neighborhoods. A month later, the revised plan was released, which announced that Renaissance would instead move to open space in the campus of West Baltimore Middle School.

In November 2015, shortly after the unrest, Renaissance (now at the former West Baltimore Middle School site) was one of several schools in the most highly affected areas to be considered for closure, leading to community outcry and resistance. As a result of this community activism, CEO Gregory Thornton announced a reversal of the proposal, leaving Renaissance open.

Following the death of three students, City Schools, now under the leadership of CEO Sonja Santelises, once more recommended Renaissance for closure, this time at the end of the 2016–2017 school year, although Santelises also stated that she was exploring possible new sites for the school. In December of the same year however, the school board again delayed the vote on closing Renaissance, delaying until January 2017. When the board returned to the matter in January 2017, the Office of New School Initiatives released a report proposing Renaissance be relocated to the campus of Baltimore City Community College (BCCC) in the Burleith-Leighton neighborhood. This plan did not last long though, as management changes at BCCC ended the lease negotiations. After a $1 million donation was made to the school from an anonymous donor, City Schools again changed course, approving Renaissance to remain open at its present site, co-located in the same building as Booker T. Washington Middle School. The two schools share facilities such as the gymnasium and the auditorium, but are otherwise kept separate from one another.

== Grants and funding ==
Owing to both its high need and occasional national and local prominence, Renaissance Academy has been the recipient (in whole or part) of a large amount of outside funding to provide various supplementary services:

- In 2012, The United States Department of Education (USDE)'s White House Neighborhood Revitalization Initiative awarded a $500,000 "Promise Neighborhoods" grant to the University of Maryland School of Social Work's Promise Heights program to provide wrap-around services to a group of four schools, including Renaissance. The project proposed to provide medical screenings, job training, parenting support and other services to students and families. By 2015, this grant had increased to $720,000.
- In 2016, Renaissance received a $350,000 grant from the USDE's Project School Emergency Response to Violence (SERV). The grant allowed the school to fund programs to respond to a number of incidents of violent death involving students, including a fatal stabbing within the school itself.
- In 2017, Renaissance initially received an anonymous donation for $1 million, announced in February. It was revealed in July of that year that the source of the donation was the Baltimore Ravens, and the total donation increased to $1.5 million. The Ravens planned to not only provide the funding for building rehabilitation and improvements, but to arrange the logistics and contracting for the work.
- In 2018, the Promise Heights program announced it would be distributing part of a $30 million grant to five schools including Renaissance. The program would provide wrap-around social work services including college and career supports, mentorship and tutoring.

== Alumni ==
- Butch Dawson - Baltimore rapper
