= Soweto String Quartet =

String quartet

The Soweto String Quartet is a string quartet from Soweto (Johannesburg) in Gauteng, South Africa, composed of Reuben Khemese, Makhosini Mnguni, Sandile Khemese and Thami Khemese. Their music is a fusion of the "dance rhythms of Kwela, the syncopated guitars of Mbaqanga, the saxophones and trumpets of swaying African jazz and the voices of people singing in joyous, easy harmony".

The Soweto String Quartet is autonomous and independent and has not affiliated with any organisation or institution since its inception. The quartet became a full-time professional outfit in 1992. They performed at President Mandela's inauguration, after which Mandela started recommending them for other jobs. The album Zebra Crossing peaked at number 16 and Renaissance peaked at number 29 on the Australian ARIA Charts.

== Discography ==
- Zebra Crossing (1994)
- Renaissance (1996)
- Millennia (1998)
- Rhythms of Africa (1999)
- Four (2001)
- Our World (2003)
- Soweto String Quartet Plays Gospel (2005)
- Collections (2007)
- A Soweto String Quartet Christmas
- The Essential Soweto String Quartet
- SSQ Speel Afrikaans Treffers Vol. 2 (2013)

== See also ==
- Matlhaela Michael Masote
