= East Los Angeles Renaissance Academy =

Art school in Los Angeles, California

- Academia Renacimiento del Este de Los Ángeles (Spanish)

Location
- 4211 Dozier St. East Los Angeles; Los Angeles, California 90063; United States; 34°2′30.507″N 118°10′30.175″W

Information
- School type: Pilot school/ Public
- Religious affiliation: Secular
- Founded: 2010
- Status: Active
- School district: Los Angeles Unified School District
- School code: 7772
- NCES School ID: 12657
- Principal: Martin A Buchman
- Teaching staff: 21 Teachers
- Grades: 9–12
- Gender: Co-Ed
- Enrollment: 439 (2020-2021)
  - Grade 9: 128
  - Grade 10: 100
  - Grade 11: 117
  - Grade 12: 94
- Student to teacher ratio: 23:1
- Classrooms: 17
- Campus: Esteban Torres High School
- Campus type: Urban
- Color: Purple
- Mascot: Toro (Bull)
- Newspaper: The Renaissance Newsletter (discontinued)
- Website: elaratorreshs.lausd.org

East Los Angeles Renaissance Academy (ELARA) Renaissance; officially East Los Angeles Renaissance Academy at Esteban E. Torres High School No. 2, unofficially East Los Angeles Renaissance Academy, School of Urban Planning and Public Policy, is a small public, coeducational, pilot secondary school of the Los Angeles Unified School District (LAUSD) located in East Los Angeles, California. Founded in 2010 as an attempt to relieve student overcrowding at James A. Garfield High School, ELARA is one of five small schools established on the Esteban E. Torres High School campus, alongside East Los Angeles Performing Arts Magnet (ELAPA Magnet), Humanitas Academy of Arts and Technology (HAAT), Social Justice Leadership Academy (SJLA), and Engineering and Technology Academy (ETA).

ELARA is a four-year high school with an enrollment of 439 students for the 2020-2021 academy year. The school is distinctive for its curricular emphasis on the field of urban planning and public policy. Students are offered core academic courses, Advanced Placement (AP) courses, and courses required to prepare students for admission to University of California (UC) and California State University (CSU) systems.

== History ==
=== Pre-Construction ===
==== Overcrowding at James A. Garfield High School ====
By the late 2000s, the Eastside region of the City of Los Angeles and East Los Angeles, an unincorporated area of Los Angeles, had a problem with overcrowded high schools due minimal school choices for new students. However, it was the overcrowded conditions at James A. Garfield High School, the only high school in East Los Angeles, which led to the establishment of Esteban E. Torres High School and its five pilot schools. Garfield was founded in 1925 and was built to withhold 1,500 students; however, by the late 20th century, the student population at the school had increased to a point at which the school had to implement a multi-track/year-round calendar to relieve the overpopulation, though this did not last. The overcrowding problem continued into the 21st century, prompting demands for the construction of a second high school in the area.

==== Approval of East Los Angeles High School No. 2 ====
In 2004, the Board of the Education of the City of Los Angeles approved the construction of a new high school, then called “East Los Angeles High School No. 2”. On June 22, the Board of Education approved the final location of the future Esteban E. Torres High School.

Prior to the construction of the Torres High School campus, the land on which the ELARA building is now located was an agricultural center administered by the Los Angeles Conservation Corps.

=== Founding of ELARA ===
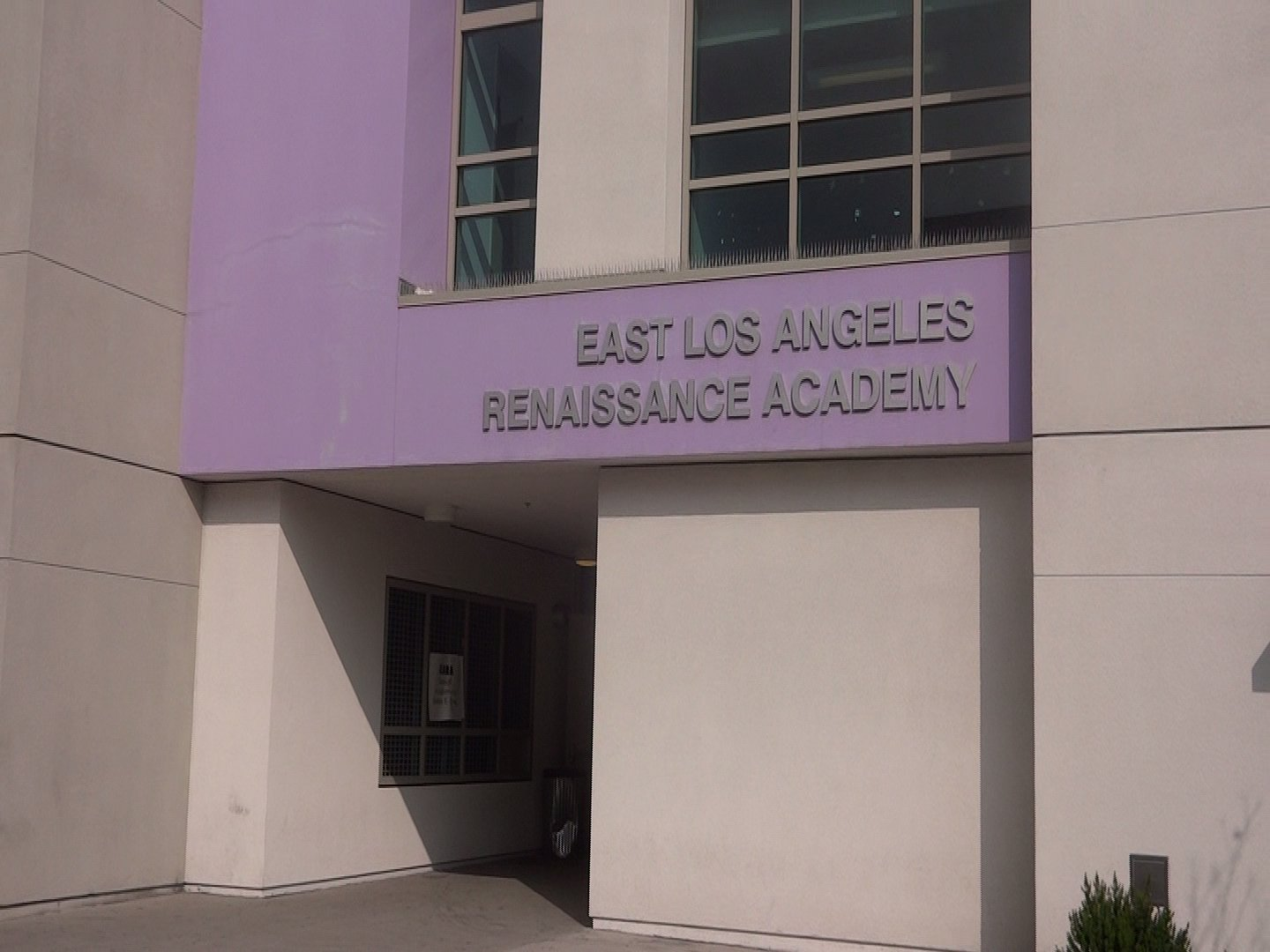
ELARA main entrance in 2013

In 2009, seven James A. Garfield High School teachers, along with students, parents, and representatives from community-based organizations, such as Inner City Struggle, joined and submitted a proposal to the Los Angeles Unified School District Public School Choice motion in order to found the proposed East Los Angeles Renaissance Academy as a Pilot School at the yet unopened Esteban E. Torres High School campus. The main Design Team was composed of Martin Buchman, Michael Leavy, Zoe Souliotis-Foley, Michael Rocha, Rachel Varty, Norm Chen, and Adrianne Harwood.

=== 2010-present ===
After being approved by the motion, the East Los Angeles Renaissance Academy opened, alongside its four other sister schools—East Los Angeles Performing Arts Academy (now Magnet), Engineering and Technology Academy, Humanitas Academy of Art and Technology, and Social Justice Leadership Academy—on September 13, 2010, at Torres campus.

On June 21, 2012, ELARA held its first class graduation. On June 5, 2014, the last of the founding student body graduated from the school.

On September 24, 2018, former biology teacher, Gina Murry, was accused of sexually assaulting a 15-year-old student during the months of May and June. She faces six counts of unlawful sexual intercourse and four counts each of committing a lewd act on a child, oral copulation of a person under 16, and sexual penetration by a foreign object. On November 5, 2019, Murry pleaded no contest to the accusations. On January 14, 2020, she was sentenced to 2 years in state prison.

== Education ==
=== School of Urban Planning and Public Policy ===
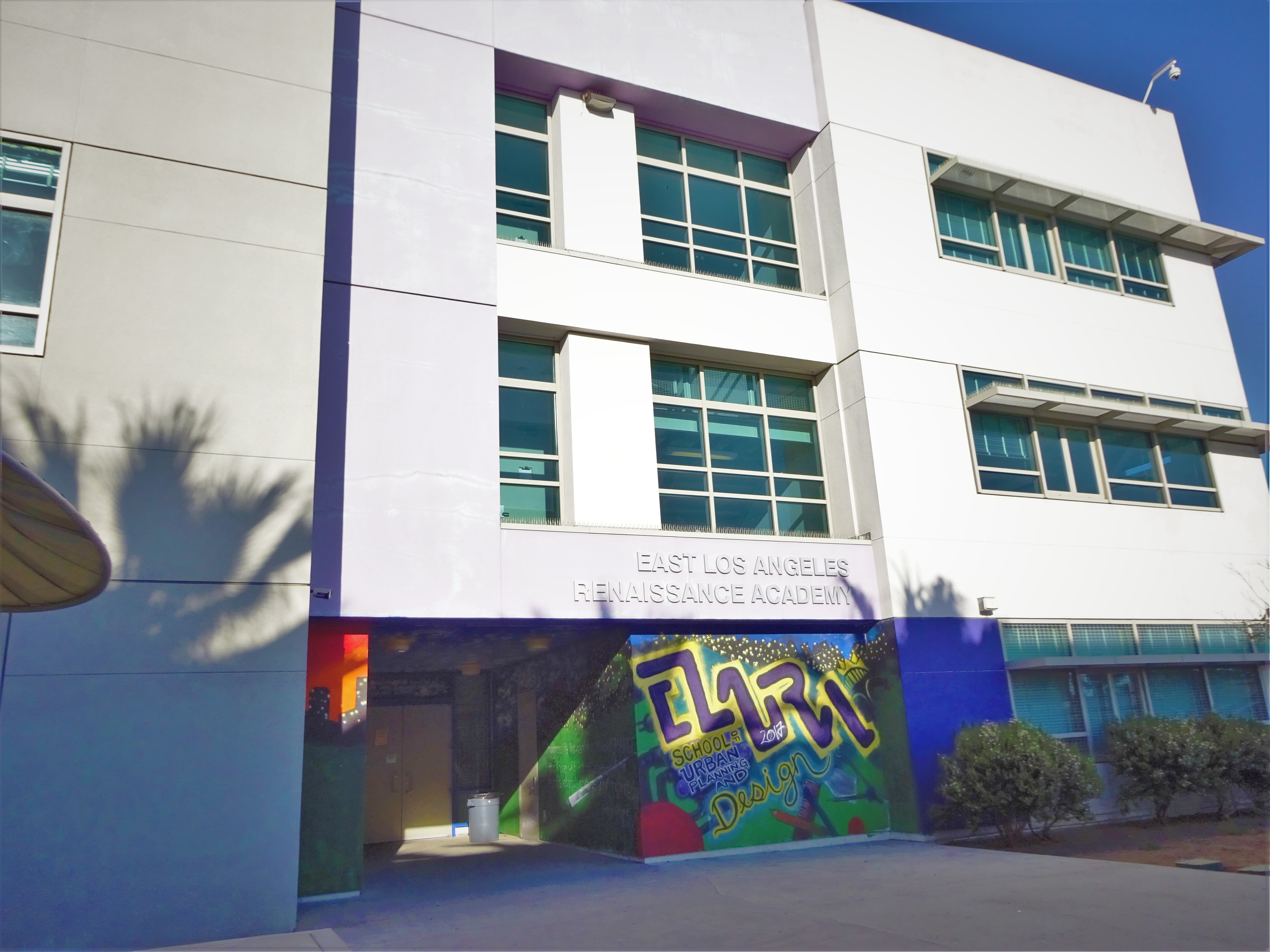
ELARA main entrance in 2017

ELARA was designed to prepare students in the field of urban planning and public policy. The mission of the school is for students to see themselves as architects of their own future and of their community.

ELARA offers to its students a full range of college preparatory classes, independent study opportunities, project-based electives in Journalism and Urban Planning, and community-based internships—all with an emphasis in urban planning and public policy.

ELARA graduates obtain broad-based knowledge, collaborative skills, and professional preparation for their communities and professions.

Renaissance is "one of only three high schools in the United States with an Urban Planning/Public Policy focus".

=== Principals of ELARA ===
| Term as Principal | | Principal | Prior Position | Term | Assistant Principal |
|---|---|---|---|---|---|
| 1 | September 13, 2010 – June 22, 2012 | Maricela Ramirez | Theodore Roosevelt High School; Social Studies Teacher | – | none |
| 2 | August 14, 2012 – June 10, 2016 | Jose Gonzalez | Special Education Coordinator | August 18, 2015 – June 10, 2016 | Martin A. Buchman |
| 3 | August 16, 2016 – Present | Martin A. Buchman | Renaissance; Lead Teacher & Assistant Principal | Current | Diana Martinez |

=== Schedule ===
==== Block Schedule (2010-2012) ====
During its first two years, ELARA functioned under a 2x8 block schedule system that allowed for the flexibility to accommodate students who needed to remediate their academic stance, accelerate in their studies, and acquire special needs during the regular school day. Under this schedule, students were granted an advantage in gaining more course credits than they would have gotten on a traditional schedule where a student would go to all their classes in a single day.

Ex. 2x8 Block Schedule of an 11th Grader (2011-2012)
| Period | 1st Semester | | 2nd Semester | |
| Period | Day A | Day B | Day A | Day B |
|---|---|---|---|---|
| Period 1/5 | Draft Architecture 1A | Trigonometry A | Draft Architecture 1B | Trigonometry B |
| Period 2/6 | AP English Lit. A | AP Spanish Lang. A | AP English Lit. B | AP Spanish Lang. B |
Advisory
Lunch
| Period 3/7 | Sociology | U.S. History A | Psychology | U.S. History B |
| Period 4/8 | Drawing A | Filmmaking A | Drawing B | Filmmaking B |

==== 6-Course Rotating Schedule (2012-present) ====
During the 2012–2013 school year, ELARA switched from the 8-course block schedule system to a 6-course rotating schedule system. Under this system, students meet for five of their six classes on any one day. Each day, one class of the six is “dropped” in the first rotation and another is “dropped” in the second rotation, adding the previously missing class to the beginning of the rotation. The rotation takes six days to complete and the process repeats beginning on the 7th school day.

Under this schedule system, ELARA class periods, or "tracks", are not listed in numerical hierarchy (1, 2, 3...) but in a letter-based hierarchy (A, B, C...).

=== Community Partners ===
ELARA is in partnership with:

- UCLA
- USC
- Huntington Library
- Los Angeles Education Partnership
- Public Matters LLC
- 826LA
- Inner City Struggle
- Tony Bennett's Exploring the Arts
- Los Angeles Service Academy

== Academics ==
Overall, ELARA had in 2011 a sophomore population that placed it slightly below average in the California High School Exit Exam (CAHSEE).

In 2015, several ELARA 10th grade students took the CAHSEE, with 78 students taking the Mathematics subject exam and 75 taking the English-Language Arts (ELA) subject exam. 78% passed the Math subject, falling 7% below the statewide average of 85%. 87% passed the ELA subject, rising 2% above the statewide average of 85%.

ELARA had also in 2011 a student population that placed it below average in the California Standardized Test (CST) or STAR.

On January 1, 2014, the STAR Program was replaced by the California Assessment of Student Performance and Progress (CAASPP) System "to assist teachers, administrators, students, and parents by promoting high-quality teaching and learning through the use of a variety of assessment approaches and item types". During the 2014–2015 school year, ELARA's 11th grade class taking the CAASPP resulted with 11% exceeding the standard, 26% meeting the standard, 37% nearly meeting the standard, and 26% not meeting the standard in English Language Arts/Literacy. 2% exceeded the standard, 7% met the standard, 24% nearly met the standard, and 67% did not meet the standard in Mathematics. The 2015-2016 11th grade class resulted with 19% exceeding the standard, 49% meeting the standard, 25% nearly meeting the standard, and 7% not meeting the standard in English Language Arts/Literacy. 3% exceeded the standard, 19% met the standard, 39% nearly met the standard, and 39% did not meet the standard in Mathematics.

=== Academic Decathlon ===
ELARA is the only school on the Torres campus that provides and maintains an Academic Decathlon program for its students only. The program is provided as an elective class. In this class, students are placed into either one of three competitive team ranks based on their grade-point average and skill level: Varsity, Scholastic, and Honors. Focusing on a selected subject determined by the United States Academic Decathlon Association (USADA), the class divides its curriculum into ten different disciplines: Language & Literature, Economics, Art, Music, Mathematics, Social Science, Science, Essay Writing, Speech, and Interview.

== Demographics ==
=== Ethnicity ===
ELARA is located in East Los Angeles, California, a predominantly Hispanic/Latino community. Based on the 2010 United States census, 97.1% of the population in East Los Angeles was Hispanic or Latino.

Ethnic composition of student body
| Ethnicity | 2010-2011 | 2011-2012 | 2012-2013 | 2013-2014 | 2014-2015 | 2015-2016 | 2016-2017 | 2017-2018 | 2018-2019 |
|---|---|---|---|---|---|---|---|---|---|
| Non-Hispanic White | 0% | 4.3% | 0.5% | 1.2% | 1% | 1% | 0.7% | 0.5% | 0.7% |
| Hispanic or Latino | 98.9% | 95.3% | 98.6% | 98.3% | 97.1% | 97.8% | 98% | 98.7% | 99.3% |
| Asian American | 0% | 0% | 0.2% | 0.2% | 0.2% | 0.2% | 0.2% | 0.5% | 0% |
| African American | 0.3% | 0.2% | 0.2% | 0.2% | 1% | 0.7% | 0.5% | 0.3% | 0% |
| Native American | 0% | 0% | 0.2% | 0% | 0.2% | 0.2% | 0.5% | 0% | 0% |
| Other* | 0.8% | 0.2% | 0.2% | 0% | 0.5% | 0% | 0% | 0% | 0% |
*including unreported

=== Enrollment ===
Total Enrollment by Academic Year
| Academic Year | Enrolled |
|---|---|
| 2010-2011 | 361 |
| 2011-2012 | 471 |
| 2012-2013 | 442 |
| 2013-2014 | 420 |
| 2014-2015 | 418 |
| 2015-2016 | 402 |
| 2016-2017 | 406 |
| 2017-2018 | 392 |
| 2018-2019 | 402 |

Enrollment by Grade Level
| Grade Level | 2010-2011 | 2011-2012* | 2012-2013 | 2013-2014 | 2014-2015 | 2015-2016 | 2016-2017 | 2017-2018 | 2018-2019 |
|---|---|---|---|---|---|---|---|---|---|
| 9th | 168 | 215* | 186 | 176 | 170 | 123 | 132 | 150 | 129 |
| 10th | 120 | 139 | 113 | 101 | 93 | 136 | 108 | 84 | 107 |
| 11th | 73 | 57 | 89 | 63 | 89 | 69 | 73 | 76 | 72 |
| 12th | 0 | 60 | 54 | 80 | 66 | 74 | 93 | 82 | 94 |
*2011-2012 enrollment data shows one student enrolled as an 8th grader; outlier figure is added to 2011-2012 9th grade enrollment

During the 2017–2018 school year, 16.6% of the student body were classified as English language learners. 64 of these students had Spanish as their primary spoken language. 1 student had Mandarin Chinese as their primary language.

93.6% of the ELARA 2017-2018 student body come from low-income families. This designation is based on data presenting 367 out of the 392 students being eligible for free or reduced-price lunch. This is an increase of 8.9% from the 2016–2017 school year.
