= Renaissance Man =

Renaissance Man may refer to:

- Polymath, a person in the archetype of the High Renaissance of broad talents and expertise
- Renaissance Man (film), a 1994 comedy-drama film
- "Renaissance Man" (Star Trek: Voyager), the penultimate episode of the TV series Star Trek: Voyager
- Renaissance Man (album), a 2011 album by Jaimoe's Jasssz Band
- The Renaissance Man, an audio drama
