= Renaissance theatre =

For Renaissance theatre as subjects, see:

- History of theatre#English Elizabethan theatre
- English Renaissance theatre
- Theatre of France#Renaissance theatre
- Renaissance tragedy

For Renaissance Theatre or Renaissance Theater as venues, see:

- Renaissance Theatre (Mansfield, Ohio), movie palace-type theater
- Renaissance Theatre Company (1987–1992), London-based company founded by Kenneth Branagh and David Parfitt
- Renaissance Ballroom & Casino (formerly known as Renaissance Theatre) (1921–1979), Harlem, Manhattan
