= List of ships named Renaissance =

Several ships have been named Renaissance:

- La Renaissance (barge) (1960) is a French inland waterways passenger vessel, converted from a cargo barge in 1997
- MS Renaissance (1966) was a cruise liner, built for French company Paquet Cruises. She was sold in 1977 and subsequent names included Homeric Renaissance and World Renaissance.
- MS Renaissance (1992) is a cruise ship, purchased by Compagnie Française de Croisières in 2022.
- Renaissance-class cruiseships were named Renaissance I to Renaissance VIII, and operated by Renaissance Cruises between 1989 and 2001, including:
  - Renaissance II, launched in 1988
  - Renaissance VII, built in 1991
