= Esteban Torres High School =

Location
- 4211 Dozier St; Los Angeles, California 90063; United States; 34.041817°N 118.175483°W

Information
- School type: Public
- Opened: September 13, 2010; 16 years ago
- Locale: Suburban, Large
- School district: Los Angeles Unified School District
- NCES District ID: 0622710
- NCES School ID: 062271012787
- Teaching staff: 21.64 (on an FTE basis)
- Grades: 9–12
- Enrollment: 243 (2024–25)
- Student to teacher ratio: 11.23
- Colors: Black Red White and Grey
- Mascot: Toros
- Website: torreshaaths.lausd.org

Esteban Torres High School is a public high school, it opened in 2010 in East Los Angeles, an unincorporated section of Los Angeles County, California.

== History ==
The school was originally known as East Los Angeles Area High School #2. In 2006 the school was named Esteban E. Torres High School, after retired U.S. Representative Esteban Edward Torres. The school opened on September 13, 2010 with students in grades 9–12.

== Campus ==
The school is sited on 12.15 acres which was formerly occupied by Hammel Street Elementary School and commercial and housing developments. The buildings were designed by Langdon Wilson Architects.

== Curriculum ==
The school is composed of five smaller schools:

School	Principal	Focus
East Los Angeles Performing Arts Academy	Carolyn L. McKnight	Dance, theater, and music, college preparatory curriculum. Students in grades 8-11 may apply online at echoices.lausd.net. Website: elapaa-lausd-ca.schoolloop.com In 2020 serves around 409 students in grades nine through twelve, with a student-teacher ratio of 19:1. Full-time teachers 21. Demographics of student body: Ethnic Breakdown / 2021 / 2020; American Indian/Alaskan Native / 0.2% / 0.5%; Hispanic and Latino American / 92% / 91%; Black / 6% / 6%; Asian American / 1% / 0.2%; Native Hawaiian or other Pacific Islander / 0% / 0%; White / 1% / 2%; Multiracial Americans / 0% / 0.2%; Female / 61% / 62%; Male / 39% / 38%; US News 2021 rankings: 73 in Los Angeles Unified School District High Schools; 303 in Los Angeles metropolitan area High Schools; 466 in Magnet High Schools; 767 in California High Schools; 5,394 in National Rankings; US News 2020 rankings: 80 in Los Angeles Unified School District High Schools; 201 in Los Angeles metropolitan area High Schools; 329 in Magnet High Schools; 457 in California High Schools; 3,079 in National Rankings; US News 2019 rankings: 313 in Los Angeles metropolitan area High Schools; 461 in Magnet High Schools; 865 in California High Schools; 6,553 in National Rankings
Engineering and Technology Academy	Dr. Luis Rodriguez	Science, technology, engineering and mathematics In 2020 serves around 397 students in grades nine through twelve, with a student-teacher ratio of 21:1. Full-time teachers 19. Demographics of student body: Ethnic Breakdown / 2021 / 2020; American Indian/Alaskan Native / 0.3% / 0.3%; Hispanic and Latino American / 99% / 99%; Black / 0% / 0%; Asian American / 1% / 1%; Native Hawaiian or other Pacific Islander / 0% / 0%; White / 0.3% / 0%; Multiracial Americans / 0% / 0%; Female / 23% / 23%; Male / 77% / 77%; US News 2021 rankings: 84 in Los Angeles Unified School District High Schools; 326 in Los Angeles metropolitan area High Schools; 877 in California High Schools; 6,295 in National Rankings; US News 2020 rankings: 110 in Los Angeles Unified School District High Schools; 269 in Los Angeles metropolitan area High Schools; 676 in California High Schools; 4,609 in National Rankings; US News 2019 rankings: 367 in Los Angeles metropolitan area High Schools; 1,112 in California High Schools; 10,128 in National Rankings
Humanities Academy of Art and Technology	Deborah A. Lowe	Arts-based study of the humanities In 2020 serves around 415 students in grades nine through twelve, with a student-teacher ratio of 21:1. Full-time teachers 20. Demographics of student body: Ethnic Breakdown / 2021 / 2020; American Indian/Alaskan Native / 0.3% / 0.2%; Hispanic and Latino American / 99% / 98%; Black / 0.3% / 0.2%; Asian American / 0% / 0%; Native Hawaiian or other Pacific Islander / 0% / 0%; White / 1% / 1%; Multiracial Americans / 0% / 0.2%; Female / 53% / 56%; Male / 47% / 44%; US News 2021 rankings: 51 in Los Angeles Unified School District High Schools; 239 in Los Angeles metropolitan area High Schools; 559 in California High Schools; 3,681 in National Rankings; US News 2020 rankings: 62 in Los Angeles Unified School District High Schools; 168 in Los Angeles metropolitan area High Schools; 365 in California High Schools; 2,560 in National Rankings; US News 2019 rankings: 122 in Los Angeles metropolitan area High Schools; 274 in California High Schools; 1,827 in National Rankings
East Los Angeles Renaissance Academy	Martin A Buchman	Urban planning and design In 2020 serves around 392 students in grades nine through twelve, with a student-teacher ratio of 20:1. Full-time teachers 20. Demographics of student body: Ethnic Breakdown / 2021 / 2020; American Indian/Alaskan Native / 0% / 0%; Hispanic and Latino American / 99% / 99%; Black / 0% / 0.3%; Asian American / 0% / 1%; Native Hawaiian or other Pacific Islander / 0% / 0%; White / 1% / 1%; Multiracial Americans / 0% / 0%; Female / 50% / 47%; Male / 50% / 53%; US News 2021 rankings: 94 in Los Angeles Unified School District High Schools; 352 in Los Angeles metropolitan area High Schools; 1,029 in California High Schools; 8,185 in National Rankings; US News 2020 rankings: 115 in Los Angeles Unified School District High Schools; 280 in Los Angeles metropolitan area High Schools; 708 in California High Schools; 4,874 in National Rankings; US News 2019 rankings: 233 in Los Angeles metropolitan area High Schools; 545 in California High Schools; 3,783 in National Rankings
Social Justice Leadership Academy	Roseann M. Cazares	Social justice; Law In 2020 serves around 346 students in grades nine through twelve, with a student-teacher ratio of 22:1. Full-time teachers 16. Demographics of student body: Ethnic Breakdown / 2021 / 2020; American Indian/Alaskan Native / 0.3% / 0%; Hispanic and Latino American / 98% / 99%; Black / 0.3% / 0.3%; Asian American / 0% / 0%; Native Hawaiian or other Pacific Islander / 0.3% / 0.3%; White / 1% / 1%; Multiracial Americans / 0% / 0%; Female / 56% / 55%; Male / 44% / 45%; US News 2021 rankings: 33 in Los Angeles Unified School District High Schools; 172 in Los Angeles metropolitan area High Schools; 390 in California High Schools; 2,561 in National Rankings; US News 2020 rankings: 125 in Los Angeles Unified School District High Schools; 295 in Los Angeles metropolitan area High Schools; 787 in California High Schools; 5,827 in National Rankings; US News 2019 rankings: 294 in Los Angeles metropolitan area High Schools; 787 in California High Schools; 5,709 in National Rankings

== Sports ==
Soccer, cross country, basketball, wrestling and volleyball are offered for both boys and girls. Additional sports for boys include baseball and football, and for girls they have a softball team.

== Noted person ==
Actress Candy Moore taught English at the East Los Angeles Performing Arts Academy Magnet at the school till 2019.
