= Sonja Santelises =

American education executive

- Born: 1968 (age 57–58)
- Education: Brown University (BA), Columbia University (MA), Harvard University (PhD)
- Occupation: CEO of Baltimore City Public Schools (BCPS)

Sonja Santelises has been the CEO of Baltimore City Public Schools since May 2016.

== Biography ==
Sonja Santelises (née Brookins) was raised in Peabody, Massachusetts, just north of Boston. Her father Jackson Andrew Brookins was a chemist from Mississippi who was also an industrial relations executive for Eastman Kodak, and her mother Verna was a former social worker who was in charge of community relations at Polaroid as well as a district minister for the Pentecostal church. Both of her parents grew up in the Jim Crow south. She has a younger sister, Shahara, who became a college professor.

Her family were Protestants, but Santelises went to Bishop Fenwick High School, a private Catholic high school. She received a bachelor's degree in English literature and International Relations from Brown University, a Master's degree in Education Administration from Columbia University, and a doctorate in Education Administration, Planning and Social Policy from Harvard University. She worked for 25 years for urban school systems as an administrator and educator before heading BCPS.

She is married to Lew Santelises, who is an American hedge fund and private equity fund manager who founded Santelises Fund Management. They have three daughters, including two fraternal twins. She has given a TEDx talk.

From 2010 to 2013, Santelises was the chief academic officer in Baltimore, then served as vice president for The Education Trust, where she worked on K-12 policy and practice.

== In Baltimore City ==
Santelises became the CEO of Baltimore City Public Schools in July 2016, replacing Gregory Thornton, who was ousted by the school board. She has advocated for improving the curriculum as a way to help close the achievement gap, and has conducted audits to find out where students are receiving gaps in their education. She has advocated for literacy programs and stopping teacher layoffs.

=== Criticism ===
In 2017, Santelises had to defend and explain how she would fix the district's $130 million budget deficit, which she inherited from the previous administration. She received national criticism in January 2018 when several Baltimore schools had to close for days due to heating systems going down, causing near freezing temperatures in classrooms, which she said was the result of systemic and long term underfunding of the school district.
