= Matt Farley =

American musician, filmmaker and podcaster

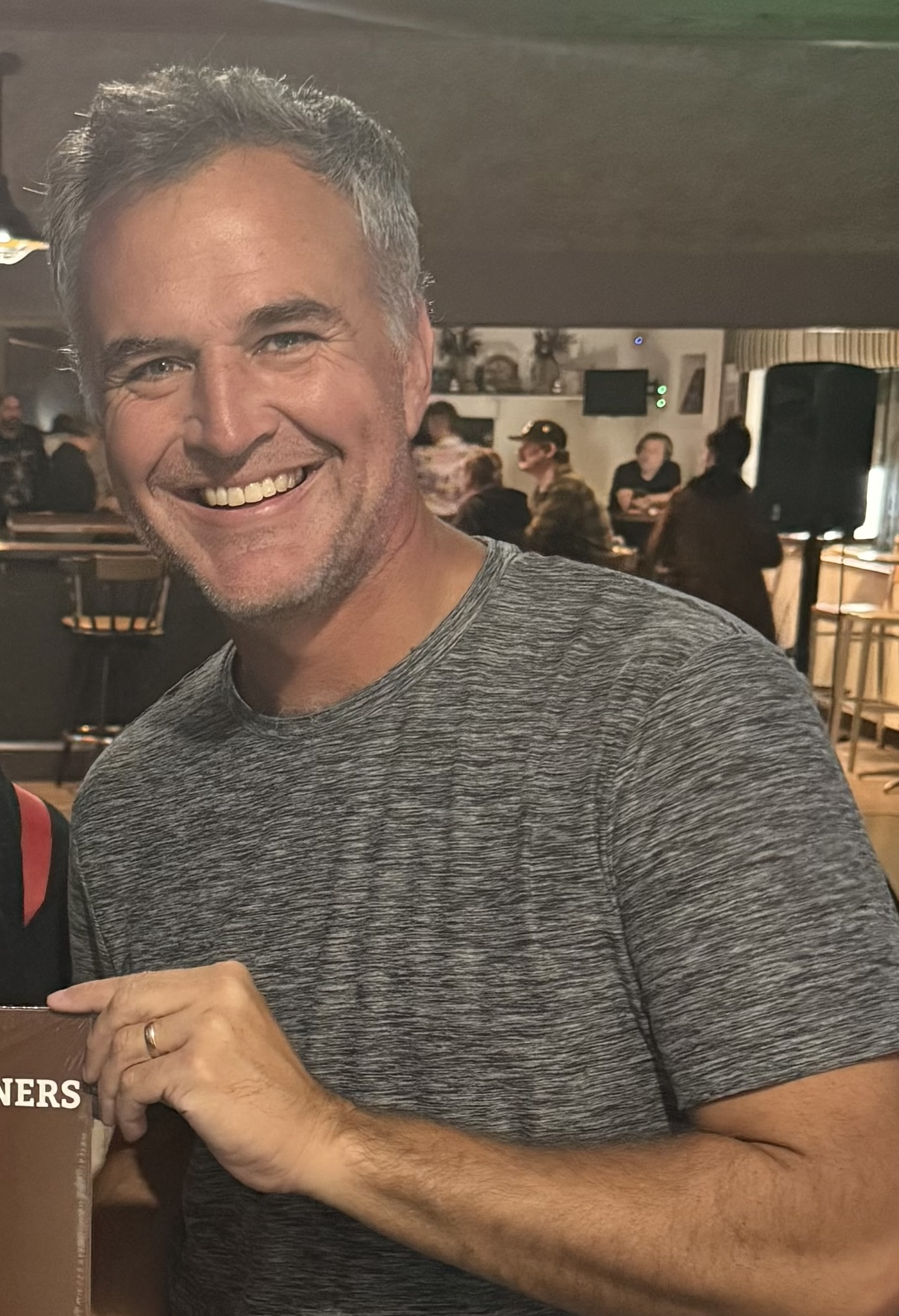
- Farley in 2025

Background information
- Born: June 3, 1978 (age 48); Massachusetts, U.S.
- Origin: Danvers, Massachusetts, U.S.
- Genres: Alternative rock, rock music, folk, novelty songs
- Occupations: Musician, filmmaker, podcaster, author
- Instruments: Vocals, piano, keyboards, guitar
- Years active: 1996–present
- Label: Motern Media
- Spouse: Elizabeth Peterson (m. 2012)
- Website: moternmedia.net

Matt Farley (born June 3, 1978) is an American singer-songwriter, musician, filmmaker, author and podcaster who has released more than 26,000 songs as of April 1, 2025. Farley's creative output is released under his label Motern Media, and he usually presents his musical work under a variety of pseudonyms and band names, including The Toilet Bowl Cleaners, Papa Razzi and the Photogs, The Hungry Food Band, The Guy Who Sings Songs About Cities & Towns, and The Odd Man Who Sings About Poop, Puke and Pee.

Farley has starred in, co-written, co-produced and released over 15 amateur feature-length movies with his friend Charlie Roxburgh including Don't Let the Riverbeast Get You! (2012); he also hosts two podcasts.

== Life and musical career ==
Farley grew up in Peabody, Massachusetts, and graduated from Bishop Fenwick High School in 1996. He majored in English at Providence College in Rhode Island. There he met guitarist Tom Scalzo, and they started musical duo Moes Haven. Farley says he wrote many songs with Scalzo before they graduated in 2000, including writing an entire half-hour album every day for a college year. Farley continued to release music with Moes Haven, including making a 30 minute album a day in 2006, releasing the best songs from each month. Farley then moved to Manchester, New Hampshire, specifically because he knew no-one who lived there. He left CDs of the band's work in public places across the city, and drove people to his local airport so he could get them to listen to the band's music. Moes Haven was strongly influenced by Bob Dylan, Van Morrison and Pink Floyd. Farley also worked a 40-hour-week day job for three days a week at a group home for teenagers, and continued to do so until 2017.

Farley states that in 2004, the pair learned they could upload music to CD Baby. A few years later, he discovered that "Shut Up Your Monkey", a comical song by the band, had become its only song to be downloaded in large numbers, and that their songs with silly titles were the only ones to generate revenue. He soon began writing and recording songs about common terms he thought people might type into a search bar. He said in 2014 that "people were searching for unique words – words that aren't usually in song titles." He later uploaded Moes Haven's catalogue to iTunes, and then Spotify. Farley created the umbrella name for all of his works, Motern Media, after misspelling the word "intern" in a work-in-progress 10,000-page novel.

By January 2014, he had released over 14,000 songs in 200 albums under 65 different band names, at an average pace of around 20 per day, or 100 per day maximum. In January 2015, Farley said he was recording 200 songs per month, having written over 16,000 songs at that point, including a 92-song album about office supplies. He had set a goal to quit his day job so he could make music seven days a week.

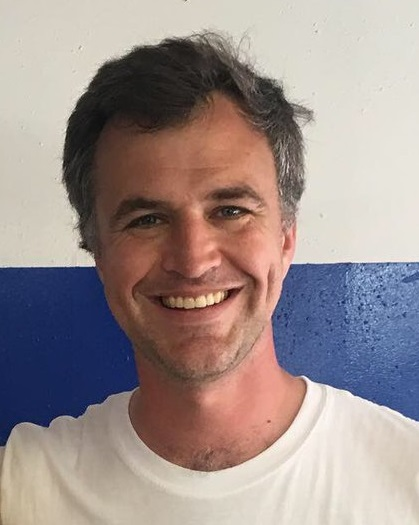
Farley in 2019

In 2016, he performed "Used to Be a Pizza Hut", a song topic derived from internet traffic about how re-purposed locations of the American chain restaurant still retain their distinctive roof style, on The Tonight Show Starring Jimmy Fallon. The Reply All podcast has featured Farley multiple times and used his custom songs. By 2017, his musical career was so lucrative that he was able to focus on it full-time, leaving behind his day-job at a group home for teenagers.

Jonathan Eig of The Wall Street Journal wrote about his experience writing a song for his children, "Armpit Farts, A Love Song," with Farley in 2020. In 2021, Farley self-published a 136-page manifesto on creativity titled "The Motern Method". In 2024, New York Times journalist Brett Martin found that Farley had written a song about him specifically, 11 years prior. Farley has now slowed down to producing one 50-song album per month, and he performs an annual five-and-a-half-hour concert "extravaganza" in Danvers, Massachusetts, where he now lives. His songs received attention on TikTok in October 2024 when users of the site discovered they could find their own personalized "poop song".

== Musical artistry ==
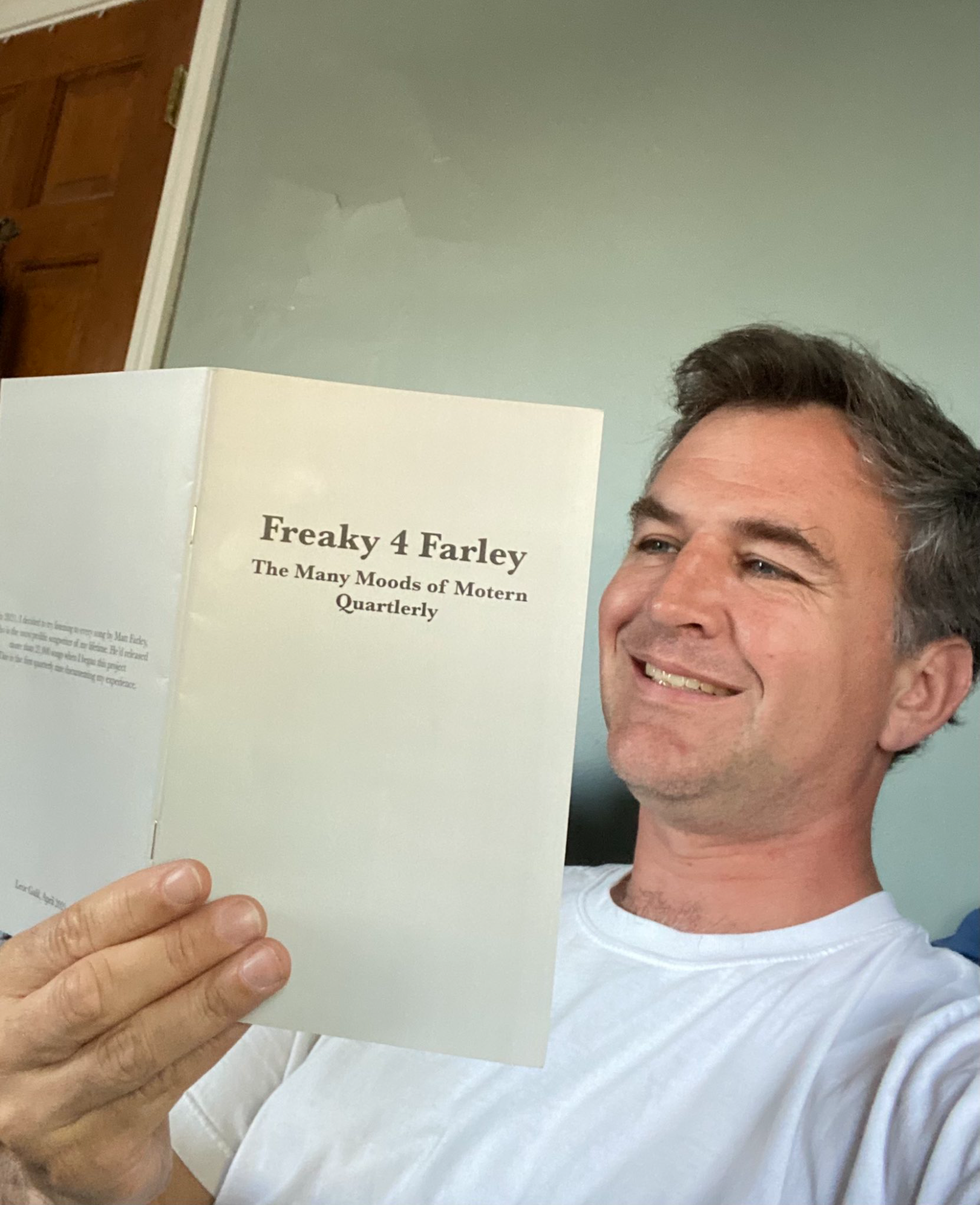
Farley reading a zine about his music in 2021

Much of Farley's output consists of piano-and-vocals compositions. His albums can be up to 100 songs in length. Farley's pseudonyms, which as of 2024 number about 80, often correlate to the subject of their songs; he releases albums about celebrities as Papa Razzi and the Photogs, releases songs about food as the Hungry Food Band, has performed 70 different versions of “We Wish You a Merry Christmas” as the Motern Media Holiday Singers, and sings songs about cities and towns as the Guy Who Sings Songs About Cities & Towns. As part of the latter, his lyrics are largely derived from reading Wikipedia articles on each town. Thousands of his songs under the name the Best Birthday Song Band Ever celebrate birthdays, each sung about a different name. As of 2024, 600 of his songs invite different feminine names to the prom, and 500 of them are marriage proposals. The Sorry Apology Person is another of his pseudonyms, with songs for specific apologies. Other albums consist of topics such as sports teams, animals, jobs, weather, and furniture. His other band names include the Guy Who Sings Your Name Over and Over, the New Orleans Sports Band, the Chicago Sports Band, the Singing Film Critic, the Great Weather Song Person, the Paranormal Song Warrior, the Passionate & Objective Jokerfan and the Birthday Band For Old People.

Farley has two pseudonyms dedicated to songs about fecal matter; The Toilet Bowl Cleaners, which he describes as "making statements with their albums", and The Odd Man Who Sings About Poop, Puke and Pee, which he says is "more shameless". According to Farley, one song that contains only the word "poop" repeated over and over generated $500 in streaming revenue every month as of 2018, likely in part because children requested it from Alexa or other devices. "Poop in My Fingernails" by the Toilet Bowl Cleaners is one of his most popular songs, with over 4.4 million streams on Spotify as of March 2024.

Some of his albums, even from a band such as the Toilet Bowl Cleaners, contain more serious output; that band's 11th album is titled Mature Love Songs, none of which are about fecal matter. Farley refers to these more serious and less lucrative albums as "no jokes" albums.

Farley often includes his personal phone number in his lyrics, which often yields calls and texts from fans surprised to find the number is real. He has stated that director Dennis Dugan once called him after hearing his song “Dennis Dugan, I Like Your Movies Very A Lot,” but that he did not realize who Dugan was until it was too late.

== Earnings ==
Farley has spoken frequently about his earnings from his music over time. Farley earned $3,000 from his music in 2008, and this had increased to $24,000 in 2012. He earned over $23,000 in 2013 from his song catalog, with 60% of this money coming from MP3 downloads and the rest from streaming. He earned over $27,000 in 2014, around $65,000 per year by 2018, and almost $200,000 per year by 2023. Until 2021, Farley generated $2,000 or more in revenue per month from writing custom songs.

As of 2024, Farley has earned approximately $469,000 from his pseudonyms the Toilet Bowl Cleaners and the Odd Man Who Sings About Poop, Puke and Pee collectively. Additionally, he has earned $41,000 from Papa Razzi and the Photogs, $38,000 from the Best Birthday Song Band Ever, and $80,000 from the Guy Who Sings Your Name Over and Over. Many of his other pseudonyms have earned between two and four digits.

== Filmmaking ==
Alongside his musical output, Farley has also made more than a dozen independently financed low-budget films, almost all as collaborations with director Charles Roxburgh, which star their family and friends, with titles such as Freaky Farley (2007) and Slingshot Cops (2016). Don't Let the Riverbeast Get You! (2012) is his most popular work, about a cryptid threatening a small New England town, featuring his father as big-game hunter.

Their early films were mostly comedy-horrors, but their more recent films have broadened in their genre. As an example, in Magic Spot (2022), fan-favorite recurring actor Kevin McGee stars as the deceased Uncle Dan Port, who as a ghost visits his young nephews and nieces to teach them a poem; when his nephews Walter (Farley) and Poopy (Chris Peterson) reflect on the poem as adults, they find that it reveals the secret to both time travel and their uncle's mysterious death. From 2021 through 2025, Farley and Roxburgh are attempting to release two films per year.

His working method, primarily relating to his music, is the subject of a 2018 Australian documentary, Lessons from a Middle Class Artist. He wrote and directed two fictionalized self-portraits on his life and career, 2013's Local Legends and 2024's Local Legends: Bloodbath!, the only films Farley has made where Roxburgh is not credited as director and co-writer.

Farley's film work has been chronicled in the book of interviews Motern on Motern: Conversations with Matt Farley and Charles Roxburgh by Will Sloan and Justin Decloux, whose podcast The Important Cinema Club helped spur the films to notoriety. In 2020, Spectacle Theatre and Laserblast Film Society presented an online retrospective of Motern's film work; Spectacle also hosted an in-person retrospective in Brooklyn in 2024.

== Other works ==
Farley also hosts two podcasts, The Motern Media Infomercial Podcast, on which he describes his life in the music/arts industry, and The Motern Media Celtics Podcast, a fortnightly basketball podcast focusing on the Boston Celtics and the NBA, that he co-hosts with bandmate and friend Doug "Froggy" Brennan.

Farley released his first book, The Motern Method, in December 2021. He describes it is a self help book about his creative process. He has also released three other books: The 50, Magic Spot; the original screenplay, and The Selected Works of The Toilet Bowl Cleaners.

== Personal life ==
Farley has two children with his wife Elizabeth, and lives in Danvers, Massachusetts. He owns a cockapoo named Pippi.
