= Renaissance Tower =

Renaissance Tower may refer to the following in the United States:

- Renaissance Tower (Dallas)
- Renaissance Tower (Sacramento)
- Renaissance Center, Detroit, Michigan
