= The Beat (magazine) =

British magazine

- Categories: Police
- Frequency: Quarterly
- Publisher: Met
- First issue: 4 April 2010
- Country: United Kingdom
- Based in: London

The Beat is a free magazine for young Londoners.

The quarterly magazine is funded by the Association of Chief Police Officers. It covers problems such as gangs, drug abuse and weapons, besides dispensing advice on crime-prevention and tips on how the young can keep their communities safe.

About 100,000 copies are being sent to state schools in London, reaching almost every year-six student in the capital. The inaugural issue was distributed during Easter, April 2010.
