= Renaissance Enterprises =

Non-profit organization

- Formation: 1988; 38 years ago
- Founder: Bob Rowe
- Purpose: Therapeutic entertainment
- Location(s): Michigan, Indiana, Illinois, Tennessee and New York

Renaissance Enterprises is a nonprofit organization whose goal is to increase the quality of life for elderly people in long term care facilities and senior centers by providing regular interaction with creative arts, artists, artisans, and performers.

== Origins ==
Audience for a Renaissance program

Renaissance Enterprises was founded in 1988 by Bob Rowe to reach out to elderly members of the community. The organization operates in Michigan, Indiana, Illinois, Tennessee and New York as well as some neighboring states.

== Mission ==
Renaissance Enterprises provides arts and music programs to nursing homes and related care facilities utilizing the services of artists, artisans and performers to serve the elderly through the arts to assist healing and ease suffering. They provide music, dance, puppetry, live art, and others.

Renaissance produced a booklet for artists to guide them in performances for these special audiences.

Renaissance has a staff of 25 volunteer artists and typically delivers over 100 performances per year to audiences that are confined.

Renaissance Enterprises provides programming but does not provide art therapy, music therapy, or dance and movement therapy, as they are not trained to do so. Unlike Renaissance Enterprises' volunteer staff, art therapists, music therapists, dance therapists, and creative arts therapists are allied and/or mental health care professionals who go through a lengthy educational and training process, complete supervised fieldwork, and pass license or board exams.

== Notability ==
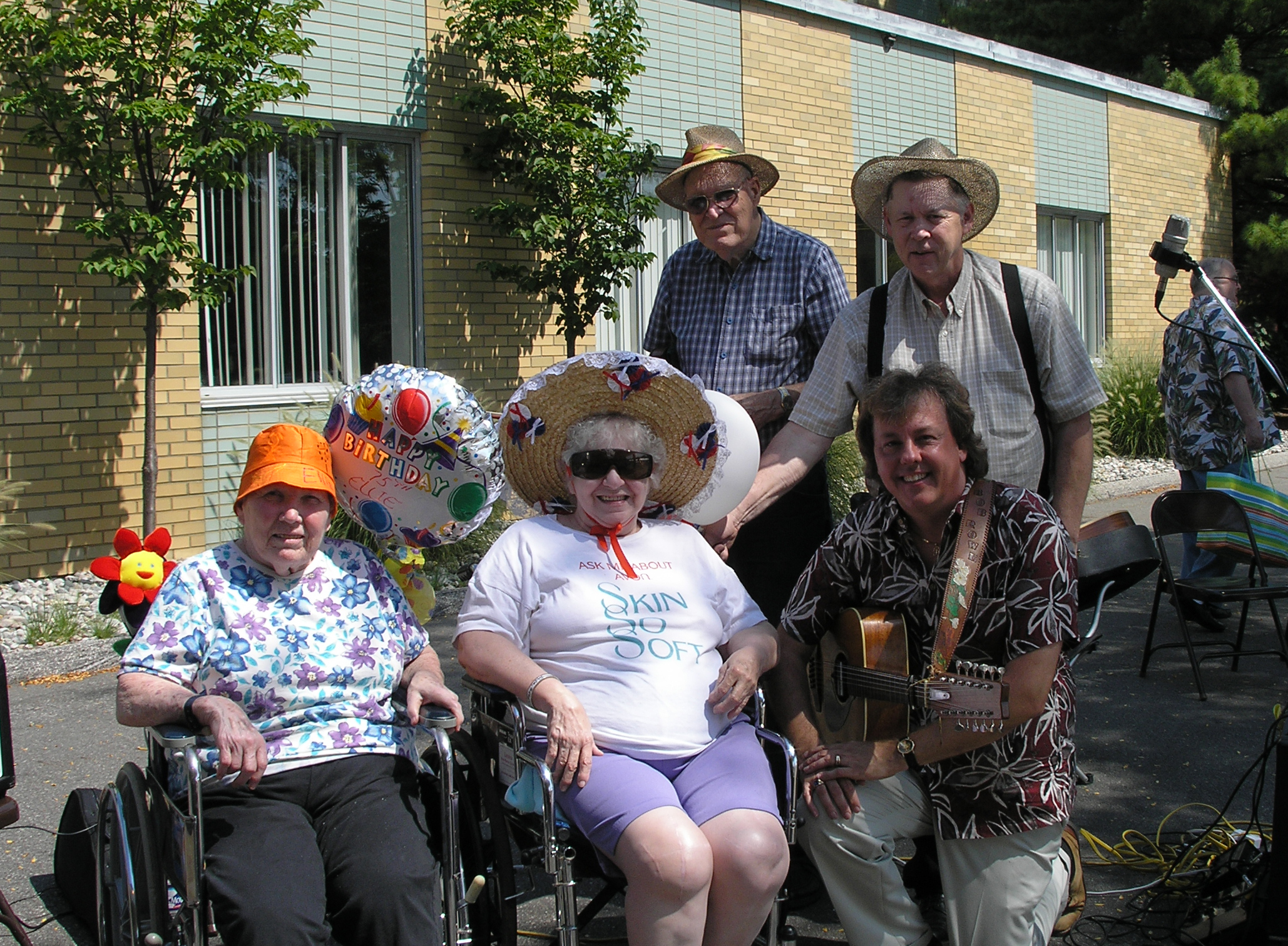
Bob and the Green Valley Boys pose with some residents after a concert in Battle Creek Michigan

In 2006 the executive director was presented with the Mother Teresa Award for this work.

In 1992, Mother Teresa wrote: "Your work of love in nursing homes, hospitals and for the aged, the neglected and the forgotten is truly the work of peace, for the fruit of love is service and the fruit of service is peace. Works of love like yours bring one face to face with God. Continue to use music to make the presence of God - His love and compassion better known to those in need - His little ones who have forgotten to smile. My prayer is with you in a special way and with all connected with Renaissance Enterprises."

The organization's work has been featured in Catholic Digest.

== Funding ==
Renaissance is supported by charitable foundations, individual donations, corporate donations and support from the care facilities where they work and from sales of artist's CDs.

Foundations that have supported Renaissance Enterprises include:

- Arcus Foundation
- Arts Council of Greater Kalamazoo
- Battle Creek Community Foundation
- Berrien Community Foundation
- Dorothy U. Dalton Foundation
- Frey Foundation
- Frederick S. Upton Foundation
- Guido Binda Foundation
- Harold & Grace Upjohn Foundation
- Irving S. Gilmore Foundation
- Kalamazoo Community Foundation
- Leo Buscaglia Foundation
- Frederick S. Upton Foundation
- Michigan Council for Arts and Cultural Affairs (MCACA)

== Sources ==
- http://newmusic.clearchannel.com/artist/bobrowe
