= Renaissance Island =

Renaissance Island may refer to:

- Renaissance Island, Oranjestad, Aruba
- Vozrozhdeniya Island, in the Aral Sea
