= Don't Let the Riverbeast Get You! =

- Promotional poster
- Directed by: Charles Roxburgh
- Written by: Matt Farley, Charles Roxburgh
- Produced by: Matt Farley
- Starring: Matt Farley; Kevin McGee; Sharon Scalzo; Elizabeth Peterson; Jim McHugh; Joanie Greenan; Chris Peterson; Jim Farley; Kyle Kochan; Tina Kochan; Bryan Fortin; Millhouse G.; Tiffany L'Heureux; Nick Lavallee; Tom Scalzo
- Release date: September 2, 2012
- Running time: 99 minutes
- Country: United States
- Language: English

Don't Let the Riverbeast Get You! is a 2012 American low budget comedy-horror film directed by Charles Roxburgh and starring Matt Farley.

== Plot ==
Disgraced tutor Neil Stuart returns to his hometown of Rivertown, USA to attend his god cousin's wedding, having previously been exiled from town due to his claims of a “riverbeast” living in the nearby woods, his reputation further diminished by defamatory articles written about him by local reporter Sparky Watts. He moves back in with his former bandmate Teddy Hollingsworth and discovers his ex-fiancée Emmaline Price has since become engaged to the volatile Danny O’Grady, with whom she plans to raise Bradley, Danny’s son from a previous marriage.

Neil reconnects with fellow Rivertown tutors Milly Jensen and Troy Keil and begins picking up tutoring jobs around town, including that of Allie Stone, a perceptive yet lazy local teenager and aspiring journalist who’s struggling with her grades at finishing school. With encouragement from Allie, Neil sets out to restore his reputation and win back Emmaline, first by proving the existence of the riverbeast with the help of famed big game hunter Ito Hootkins. Meanwhile, Teddy begins busking in a local park and falls in love with Pamela Gladwell, a free-spirited vagabond and dancer who joins him in busking. She gifts him a packet of kitty litter, which she claims is one of the world’s most versatile materials.

Neil’s attempts to improve his reputation are consistently ruined by Sparky, who reports his activities with Ito as the actions of a delusional madman. However, the riverbeast soon begins slaughtering various citizens who enter the woods, including Danny and Sparky, while Pamela goes missing, devastating Teddy. Sheriff Paultique Hanson believes Neil to be responsible and enlists Allie’s stern father Frank to conduct a citizens’ arrest, locking Neil in the town jail. Allie pledges to prove the riverbeast’s existence and free Neil’s name, teaming up with Ito and Troy in order to do so. However, the plan goes awry when the riverbeast attacks and kills Ito and Troy. Their disappearance, along with Bradley’s account of having witnessed his father’s death at the hands of the riverbeast, convinces Hanson to free Neil on the condition that he kills the riverbeast.

Neil enters the woods with Teddy and Milly, and the trio rescue Allie, whom the riverbeast has been hunting after the killing of Ito and Troy. While Neil observes that the riverbeast needs to consistently hydrate itself in order to survive, Allie flees and alerts Frank to the riverbeast’s presence, prompting him to join the others in confronting it. During the ensuing battle, the riverbeast knocks Teddy and Milly unconscious and kills Frank before setting its sights on Neil. Neil, using some of Pamela’s kitty litter given to him earlier by Teddy, manages to dehydrate and ultimately kill the riverbeast.

One year later, Neil has restored his reputation and resumed his relationship with Emmaline, with whom he plans to raise Bradley, while Allie has become an investigative journalist and written articles about the group’s encounter with the riverbeast. Rivertown holds a ceremony commemorating those involved in the incident and unveils a silver statue of Frank in honor of his memory. Pamela arrives during the ceremony and explains to Teddy that she had left town to continue her freewheeling lifestyle, only to realize she wants to live a life with Teddy, and the two reconcile. Allie asks Hanson for a final word regarding the incident, to which he reveals that the President of the United States has acknowledged the bravery of the town’s citizens before Hanson himself proclaims “we didn’t let the riverbeast get us.”

== Cast ==
- Matt Farley as Neil Stuart, a disgraced tutor.
- Kevin McGee as Frank Stone, a former professional athlete and Allie's father.
- Sharon Scalzo as Allie Stone, a perceptive yet lazy teenager whom Neil tutors.
- Tom Scalzo as Teddy Holligsworth, Neil's friend and former bandmate.
- Elizabeth Peterson as Emmaline Price, Neil's ex-fiancée.
- Jim McHugh as Sheriff Paultique Hanson, Rivertown's no-nonsense sheriff.
- Joanie Greenan as Godmother Peggy, Neil's godmother.
- Chris Peterson as Professor Ned Matthews, a professor at Farmingham Finishing School who routinely peeps on Allie.
- Jim Farley as Ito Hootkins, a professional big game hunter.
- Kyle Kochan as Sparky Watts, a local reporter with a particular distaste for Neil.
- Tina Kochan as Connie, Sparky's assistant and photographer.
- Bryan Fortin as Troy Keil, Neil's former bandmate and a fellow tutor.
- Millhouse G. as Milly Jensen, Neil's former bandmate and a fellow tutor.
- Tiffany L'Heureux as Pamela Gladwell, a vagabond and dancer with whom Teddy falls in love.
- Nick Lavallee as Danny O'Grady, Emmaline's volatile current fiancée.
- Max McGee as Maxwell Stone, Frank's son and Allie's younger brother.
- Colin Hebert as Bradley O'Grady, Danny's son from a previous marriage.
- Jon Noble as Phillipe, Cynthia's fiancée.
- Michelle Briand as Cynthia, Neil's god cousin.

== Production ==
The film is the ninth low-budget movie created by Matt Farley (also known as a prolific songwriter) and Charles Roxburgh. The Riverbeast costume was created from a broken wet suit bought off eBay. It was filmed in New Hampshire, Massachusetts, and Connecticut over four months in 2011, primarily with an amateur cast that the filmmakers use in most of their movies.

== Release ==
Released to little acclaim with a film premiere in West Newton, Massachusetts and DVD release in 2012, the film slowly began to take on cult status in the early 2020s with successful movie screenings and online fan reviews, becoming their most popular film.
