= Renascence =

Renascence may refer to:

- Renascence (comics) or Wind Dancer, a fictional character in the Marvel Universe
- "Renascence" (poem), a 1912 poem by Edna St. Vincent Millay
- Renascence (journal), an academic journal

== See also ==
- Renaissance, a historical period in Europe
- Renascença, a municipality in Paraná, Brazil
