= Terra II (game) =

Medieval period play-by-mail game

- Publishers: Clemens & Associates
- Years active: ~1983 to unknown
- Genres: play-by-mail
- Languages: English
- Playing time: Unlimited
- Materials required: Instructions, order sheets, turn results, paper, pencil
- Media type: Play-by-mail or email

Terra II is an open-ended, play-by-mail (PBM) wargame published by Clemens & Associates.

== History and development ==
Terra II was a tribal-based play-by-mail game published by Clemens & Associates of San Clemente, CA. The game was computer moderated and open-ended.

== Gameplay ==
The game's setting was the medieval period. Its map comprised 10-mile hexes with 22 types of terrain. In the game, players led tribes displaced by an ice age. Available tribe actions included "herding, hunting, weapon making, mining, and most of the other actions that would be found in a medieval period". The game featured realistic and detailed combat. Player could choose from a variety of paths, including exploration, trading and economics, combat, and business pursuits.

== Reception ==
William Callaway reviewed the game in a 1984 issue of Paper Mayhem. He stated that the only game drawback related to its complexity which "may only appeal to the most sophisticated and experienced PBM gamers". John Rees reviewed the game in a 1984 issue of Flagship, stating, "I recommend this game with slight hesitation", pointing to a preference toward more active closed-end games. In a later 1984 issue of Flagship, John Muir stated, "this is an excellent, fast-paced game with moderate charges". The editor of the U.S. edition of Flagship, Tim Sullivan, reviewed Terra II in a 1988 issue of the D2 Report. He stated that it was "one of the most realistic and reliable tribal clan simulations around".

Chris Frink reviewed Terra II for Fantasy Gamer magazine and stated that "Terra II is one of the more flexible PBMs around — there is so much to do and see. The combat system allows players almost unlimited ways to equip and use their forces, Because of the options offered, players can have their tribes be almost anything they want: fierce cavalry raiders, precious-metal miners, peaceable sod-busters, or wandering traders; the structure is there."

== See also ==
- List of play-by-mail games

== Bibliography ==
- Callaway, William (July–August 1984). "A Game Review... Feature: Terra – II". Paper Mayhem. No. 7. pp. 5–6.
- Harlee, Jack (Autumn 1987). "A Strategy for Terra II". Flagship. No. 16. pp. 46–47.
- McLain, Bob (November–December 1983). "Gamealog". PBM Universal. No. 1. pp. 27–33.
- Muir, John (Autumn 1984). "Advanced Terra II". Flagship. No. 4. pp. 4–7.
- Rees, John (Spring 1984). "Terra II". Flagship. No. 2. pp. 8–9.
- Sullivan, Tim (February–March 1988). "From the Helm". D2 Report: The Play-by-Mail Gamer's Reading Companion. No. 15. pp. 29–30.
