= Raul Ruiz (journalist) =

American journalist (died 2019)

Raúl Ruiz
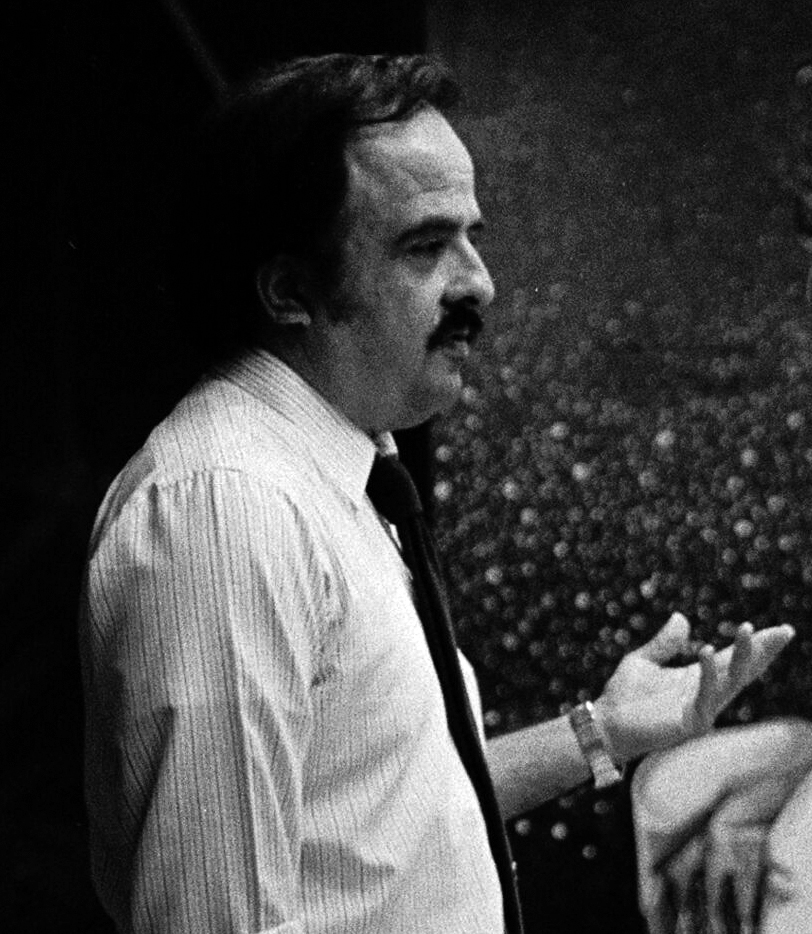
- Ruíz in 1983
- Born: July 11, 1940; El Paso, Texas, U.S.
- Died: June 13, 2019 (aged 78); Los Angeles, California, U.S.
- Education: California State University, Los Angeles (B.A., M.A.); Harvard Graduate School of Education (Ed.D., 1988)
- Occupation: Journalist · Photographer · Professor · Activist
- Years active: 1960s–2019
- Organizations: La Raza newspaper; California State University, Northridge (Chicano Studies Department); Raza Unida Party
- Known for: Editor–photographer at La Raza; iconic images of Chicano Moratorium and Ruben Salazar’s death; professor of Chicano Studies at CSUN
- Notable work: Documentary photojournalism on East L.A. walkouts and Vietnam-era protests; leadership in underground Chicano press

Raul Ruíz (11 July 1940 – 13 June 2019) was an American journalist, professor, and political activist for Chicano civil rights during the Chicano movement and for the Peace movement of the 1960s and '70s.

== Early life and education ==
Ruiz was born in El Paso, Texas but moved to Los Angeles in his teen years. He attended California State University, Los Angeles (Cal State LA) where he earned both a bachelor's degree and a master's degree. He received his doctorate from the Harvard Graduate School of Education in 1988.

== Career ==
As a reporter, and editor of La Raza, Ruíz covered the Chicano Moratorium. He notably photographed the police aiming tear gas launchers at the Silver Dollar Café, where Ruben Salazar was killed. Ruiz's photo, considered an essential historical image of the Chicano movement, ran on the cover of the L.A. Times and was reproduced around the world.

Ruiz was a candidate for La Raza Unida Party, a Chicano political party. He ran for the 48th Assembly district seat in Los Angeles in 1971, gaining 8 percent of the vote. In 1972 he ran for the 40th Assembly district seat, covering East L.A., under the La Raza Unida ticket, gaining 13 percent of the vote.

Ruiz taught for many years in the department of Chicano Studies at California State University, Northridge.

== Death ==
Ruiz died in Los Angeles on June 13, 2019.

== Legacy ==
On May 8, 2025, the Library of Congress announced that it had acquired “photographs, manuscripts and periodical collection of Raúl Ruiz." The Raúl Ruiz Chicano Movement Collection includes photographs, manuscripts, and other papers and was donated by his daughter Marcela Ponce and Marta E. Sánchez, one of his close friends. The collection will be housed in the Library’s Prints & Photographs Reading Room, Manuscript Reading Room, and Newspaper & Current Periodical Reading Room.
