= La Raza (newspaper) =

Chicano newspaper based in Los Angeles

La Raza was a bilingual newspaper and magazine published by Chicano activists in East Los Angeles from 1967 to 1977. The paper played a seminal role in the Chicano Movement, providing activists a platform to document the abuses and inequalities faced by Mexican-Americans in Southern California. Taking a photojournalistic approach, the editors and contributors at La Raza were able to capture images of police brutality, segregation, and protests that rallied support to the Chicano cause.

La Raza was founded in the basement of an East L.A. church with the objective of driving community organization for the Chicano movement, which was still on the rise, and improving awareness of the Mexican-American experience in Los Angeles, which the editors felt was neglected by the large media outlets. During its first three years, La Raza was published as an eight-page tabloid. The paper quickly grew in popularity, though, as the growth of the Chicano movement prompted the dispersal of copies of La Raza across the United States. In June 1970, the publication changed to a 20-page magazine format to gain more revenue and provide its readers with more content.

As the newspaper's popularity grew, so did the scope of its coverage, and it began to go beyond Los Angeles to discuss national and international issues from a Chicano perspective. La Raza took an ardently anti-Vietnam War stance, joining in the surge in the underground press prompted by backlash to the war. The staff at La Raza, meanwhile, became increasingly active and even militant members of the Chicano movement, helping to organize marches and clashing with officials.

By the time the magazine was shut down in 1977, an archive of 25,000 images capturing some of the most prominent events in the Chicano movement had been amassed. The archive is currently held at the Chicano Studies Research Center at UCLA.

== La Raza newspaper (1967-1970) ==
The founding of La Raza was spearheaded by Episcopalian Reverend John Luce, Cuban-born activist Elizier Risco, and Ruth Robinson, Risco's girlfriend. The three initially met in early 1967 while Robinson and Risco were working for Cesar Chavez on El Malcriado, the Chicano farmworker's union newspaper, when Chavez asked Luce to provide housing and food to farm workers. The three recognized the need for a voice to represent the urban Chicano population in Los Angeles and began to conceive of what would eventually become La Raza. Risco, who wanted to direct his efforts towards helping the urban population rather than farm workers, eventually had a falling out with Chavez, and soon after the trio of Luce, Risco, and Robinson began the process of creating the newspaper.

La Raza was officially founded in mid-1967 by Luce, Risco, Robinson, and a small group of staff members in the basement of Luce's church, the Church of the Epiphany in Lincoln Heights. It was at this meeting where the title "La Raza" was chosen for the paper, as the group felt that this phrase appealed to the highly diverse Mexican-American population in Los Angeles. During the first eight months of publication, the paper issues were typed and printed in the church basement. Risco and Robinson oversaw the writing and production of the issues while Luce provided the resources and equipment.

The first issue of La Raza was published in September, 1967 and included Corky Gonzalez's landmark poem I Am Joaquín. This first issue also included an editorial written by Richard Vargas which encapsulated the newspaper's mission:

"Mis Amigos Chicanos, the time has come to stop apologizing for being Mexicans...We must unify, organize and mobilize the entire Mexican Community into political and militant action."

=== Educational reform and the East L.A. walkouts ===
One of the major tenants of La Raza's initial platform was to improve conditions in educational institutions for minority students in Los Angeles. In its first issues, the newspaper called for improved representation of minorities among school administrators and teachers, safer conditions in schools populated by mostly minority students, and hot lunches for all students.

On December 2, 1967, La Raza announced the founding of the Barrio Union for Scholastic Community Action (BUSCA), a project headed by Risco that was committed to establishing a community educational effort through which parents and community leaders took educating Chicano students into their own hands. The project was motivated by frustration with the L.A. school system and concerns that children were not being taught enough about their Mexican-American heritage. BUSCA put an emphasis on self-expression and self-identity, teaching children to read and write in both English and Spanish and providing education in culture, history, and the arts.

La Raza gained a new level of prominence in the community in the aftermath of the East L.A. Walkouts, or the "Chicano Blowouts." The walkouts, during which thousands of high school students walked out of schools to protest educational conditions for Chicanos in L.A., served as one of the first mass mobilizations of Chicanos in the city and dramatically heightened tensions between the LAPD and the city's Mexican-American population. Risco and fellow La Raza staff members Joe Razo and Raul Ruíz helped advise the leaders of the protests, and the newspaper covered the demonstrations with an activist stance, detailing incidents of police brutality committed against protesting students. On May 31, 1968, District Attorney Evelle Younger gained indictments from a grand jury against 13 of the walkout organizers for conspiracy to commit a misdemeanor, a felony carrying a maximum prison sentence of six years. The "East L.A. Thirteen" included Risco and Razo as well as two other La Raza staff members, Moctezuma Esparza and Fred Lopez, and during the arrests, the LAPD raided La Raza headquarters.

The arrests provoked a surge in protests against law enforcement. On June 2, 1968, 2000 protesters gathered outside LAPD headquarters in what was at the time the largest Mexican-American demonstration in L.A. history; La Raza described the scene by saying the Chicano community "picked up the gauntlet and shoved it down [police chief] Reddin's throat" in protest of the "political imprisonment" of the East L.A. 13. The defendants also asserted their status as political prisoners, going on a hunger strike in prison. In a press conference following the arrests, Risco argued that the arrests were motivated by upcoming political elections and officials' desire to appear as white saviors descending on a Chicano menace. La Raza, meanwhile, lambasted the arrests as a violation of its First Amendment rights, claiming that pictures and articles prepared for future publication, telephone lists, and thousands of anti-LAPD leaflets were confiscated during the raid. The newspaper stayed on the offensive, publishing "The Yearbook" in September 1968, an issue containing an article listing the students extensive demands for educational reform. Ultimately, the Chicano community's outcry to the arrests was successful, and the East L.A. Thirteen were acquitted of all charges in October 1968. Despite its short lifespan, the saga permanently strained relations between La Raza and law enforcement, planting the seeds for the increasingly political stance the paper would take in the following years.

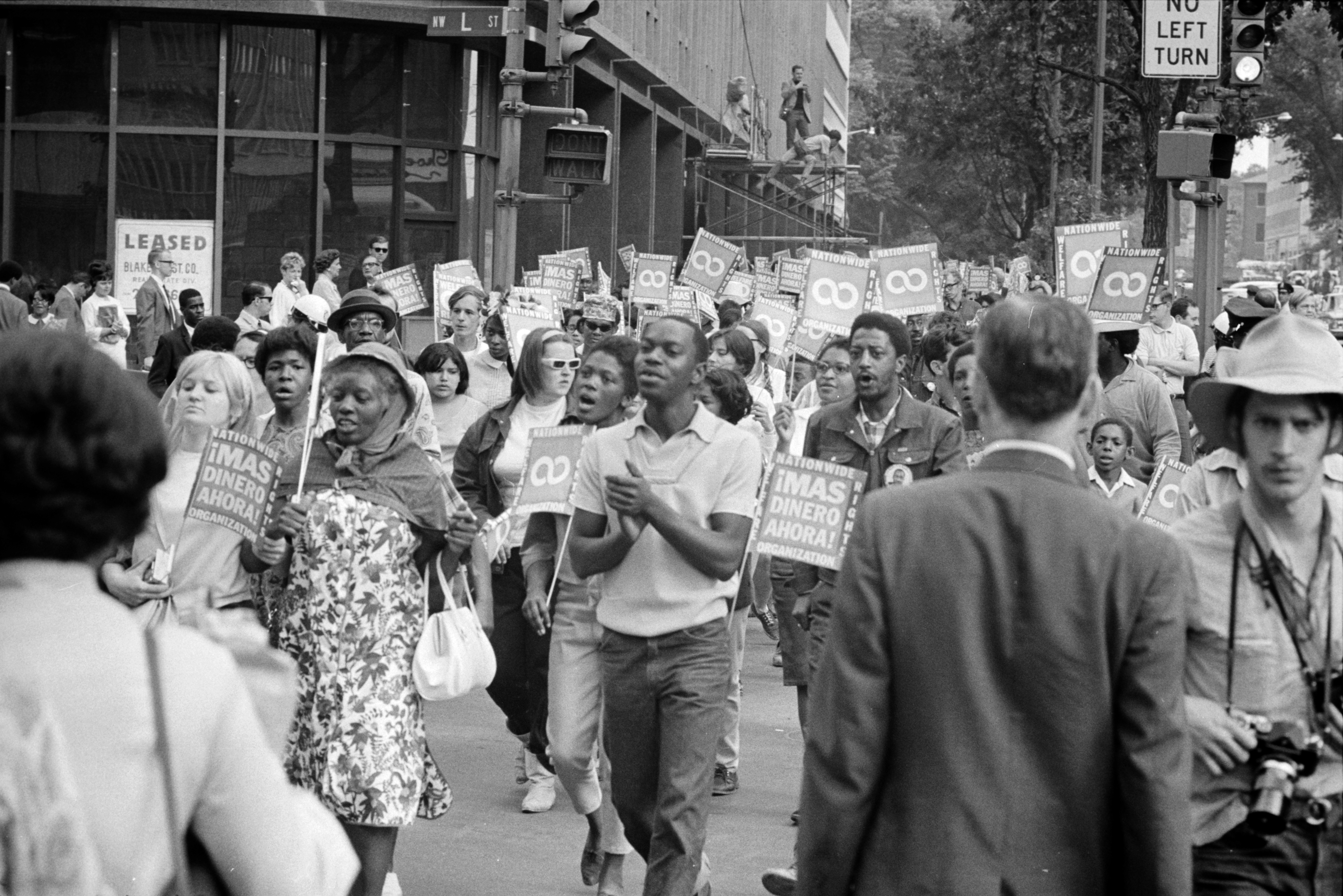
Protesters march in Poor People's Campaign, Washington D.C., 1968

=== Poor People's Campaign ===
On May 11, 1968, La Raza released one of the most prominent issues in the publication's history, a special edition devoted to documenting the Poor People's Campaign in Washington, D.C. The Quaker Church financed the issue, and 100,000 copies were printed and distributed nationwide. The issue also included an image of a young Chicanita distributing La Raza issues at the march in Washington, which became one of the most famous images in the paper's archives.

=== Internal conflict and administrative changes ===
Soon after Ruíz joined the staff of La Raza in the summer of 1968, he and Risco began to disagree over the communication style and tone that should be used in the paper, with Ruíz asserting that Risco did not understand the barrio and communicated with the Chicano community as if they were all "Bato-Locos," or gangsters. Other staff members eventually sided with Ruíz in the dispute and Risco left the paper in June, 1969, leaving Ruíz and Razo as the co-editors. This editorial change was a landmark moment in the publication's history; Ruíz remained editor until publishing ceased in 1977, exerting great influence on the objectives and activities of La Raza.

Another prominent development in 1969 was the relocation of La Raza offices in November to 3571 Terrace Drive. This was the fourth and final office change; the Terrace Drive location served as newspaper headquarters through 1977 and served as a meeting place for former staff members and activists even after La Raza was discontinued.

=== Católicos por la Raza ===
Razo and Ruíz played key roles in assisting Ricardo Cruz in the formation of Católicos por la Raza (CPLR) and La Raza provided a vehicle through which the CPLR could freely and publicly voice its criticisms of the Catholic Church. These criticisms were aired in the December, 1969 issue of the newspaper, which lampooned Los Angeles's Cardinal James Francis McIntyre as "His Eminence the Wall Street Broker." The issue also included an article titled "The Church and La Raza" which was co-written by the paper and the CPLR and called on the Catholic Church to mobilize to help Chicanos and to improve Chicano representation in the Church hierarchy. Later that month, Ruíz, Razo, and La Raza staff members Luis Garza, Fred Lopez, Roberto Gandara, and Richard Martinez were among those arrested at the violent protests at the Christmas Midnight Mass at St. Basil's Catholic Church in Los Angeles, during which 200 Chicano protesters stormed the building and smashed windows in response to the Church's decision to spend $3 million on the new cathedral rather than using the funds to help the East L.A. community. La Raza and the CPLR's conflict with the Catholic Church eventually attained positive and tangible results, with the Catholic Campaign for Human Development awarding $500,000 in grants for Chicanos in 1971, nearly 20% of which went to groups in Los Angeles.

== La Raza magazine (1970-1977) ==
In February, 1970, La Raza published its last issue using a tabloid newspaper format, transitioning to a magazine format thereafter. Publishing as a magazine enabled the publication to raise its subscription prices. The magazine format also contained longer, more sophisticated articles, serving as a more effective medium for the advocacy of the staff's long-term political goals. The format switch coincided with La Raza's move away from social activism towards more involvement in Los Angeles politics.

=== The National Chicano Moratorium March ===
One of the most significant events documented by La Raza was the National Chicano Moratorium March in Los Angeles on August 29, 1970. The march, which stands as the largest demonstration ever conducted by people of Mexican descent in the U.S., was carried out by 20,000-30,000 individuals in protest of Mexican-American casualties in the Vietnam War. The march is most infamous, though, as the scene of the death of Ruben Salazar. Salazar, a journalist for the Los Angeles Times and the director of KMEX News, was the most prominent Chicano voice in LA media. He was killed after being struck by a tear gas projectile fired by LA County deputy sheriff Thomas Wilson into the Silver Dollar Cafe, where Salazar sat drinking a beer.

Ruíz and Razo photographed the entire incident at Silver Dollar, even managing to capture a photo of the exact moment Wilson aimed his tear-gas launcher into the restaurant, a photo that became one of the most prominent images of the Chicano Movement. After struggling to find a mainstream media outlet to increase circulation of the images, Ruíz was eventually able to convince the Times to not only run them but also attribute them to La Raza.

Beyond contributing images of the scene of Salazar's death, Ruíz and Razo also served as community observers and sworn witnesses at the inquest into the incident. They vehemently condemned the treatment received by Ruíz in particular when he took the stand, arguing that he was unnecessarily interrogated and attacked by hearing officers because he was a Chicano activist. La Raza's reporting on Salazar's death further intensified the conflict between the magazine and LA authorities, contributing to the magazine's emerging ambition to enter the city's political arena.

=== La Raza Unida ===
La Raza played a substantial role in the development of El Partido de la Raza Unida in Los Angeles, a Chicano nationalist political party that gained prominence in Texas and Southern California in the 1970s. As the magazine shifted its focus towards L.A. politics in the early 1970s, it began to call for increased Chicano influence in government affairs. A 1971 La Raza article, likely written by Ruíz, argued that this influence could only be achieved through the creation of a new political party and demanded that the Chicano community break away from the Democratic and Republican parties to join La Raza Unida, which had recently established a foothold in the city. Although Chicanos had traditionally voted Democrat, the community was sick of being a "hip-pocket vote" that had been heavily gerrymandered to serve the interests of the Democratic party. By the end of 1971, La Raza was working to register as many Partido voters as possible in order to gain statewide access to the ballot, with the ultimate goal of electing Ruíz as a state assemblyman in the state's 48th district. The Party used La Raza's office as its headquarters, and La Raza suspended publication until after the election so the magazine's staff members could work for the Party.

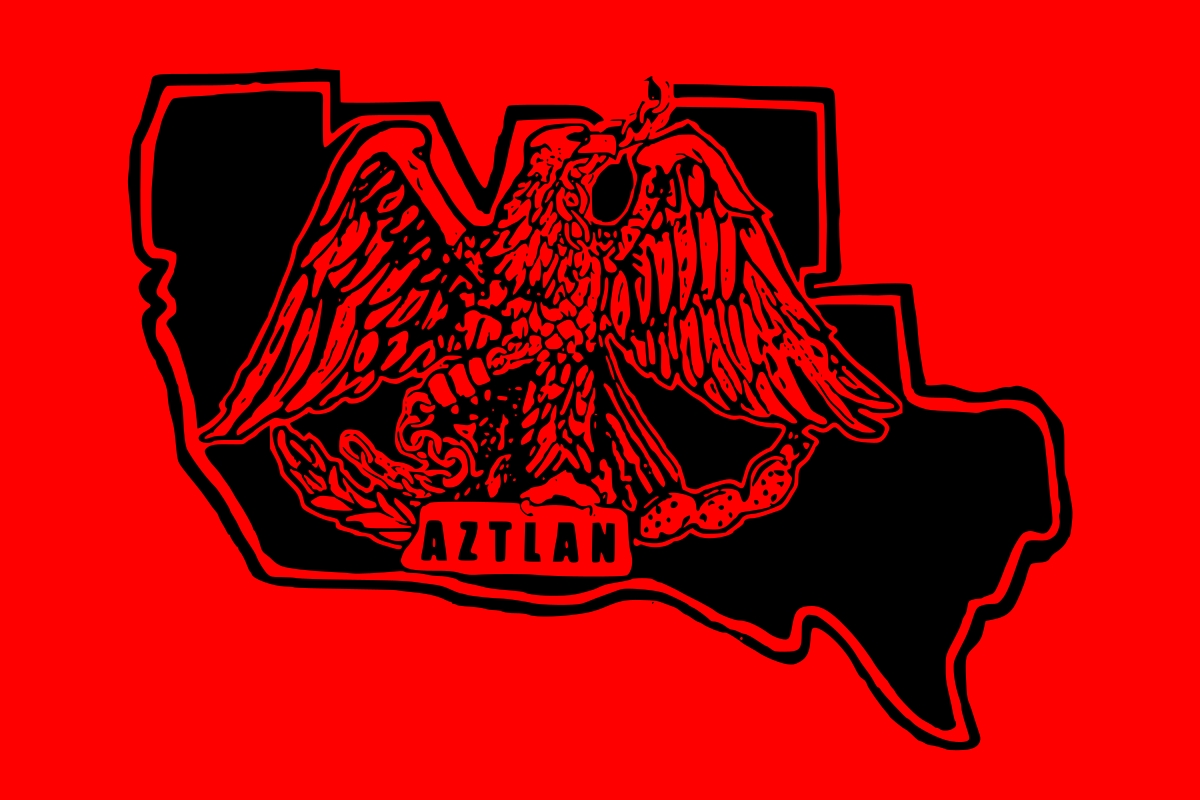
La Raza Unida Party Flag

The Party failed to register enough voters by the November 1971 special election for state assembly, forcing Ruíz to run as an independent. Even so, Ruíz earned 7% of the vote. Furthermore, Republican Bill Brophy upset Democrat Richard Alatorre in the election despite Democrats outnumbering Republicans 2-to-1 in the district; La Raza Unida and Ruíz claimed responsibility for Alatorre's loss and argued that the election was a victory for the Party, as it had succeeded in taking votes from the "Democratic machine" and raising political awareness for Chicanos. Two years later, however, reports surfaced that the Republican party had provided under-the-table funding to La Raza Unida to defeat Alatorre. In 1972, the magazine again suspended publication in the latter half of the year to support another Ruíz campaign for state assembly, this time in the 40th district. Ruíz obtained 13% of the vote, but despite performing better than he did in 1971, this election loss prompted Ruíz to take a more pessimistic view of Chicano unity in Los Angeles and give up on his quest to be elected to the state government.

La Raza Unida launched one last-ditch effort to gain political influence in L.A. in 1974 when it fought for Proposition X, a measure to incorporate East Los Angeles as its own city. In December, an incorporation election was held in which voters voted both on the proposition and the city council members who, if the proposition passed, would lead the new city. Three La Raza staff members ran in the election - Ruíz, Arturo Sanchez, and Daniel Zapata - but Proposition X was ultimately defeated. This defeat marked the end of La Raza Unida's run in Los Angeles and dashed any remaining political aspirations held by La Raza

=== Decline and cessation of publishing ===
With the stagnation of La Raza Unida, La Raza no longer played an active role in the community and lacked a signature cause to dedicate itself to. In 1975, staff numbers plummeted, and no issues were published in 1976. La Raza returned with two issues in 1977, but these issues were written with a more moderate, pragmatic viewpoint, and began to examine the Chicano movement in retrospect. Publishing was officially discontinued in 1978.

== Staff ==
La Raza was staffed by young, radical left-wing Chicanos in Los Angeles. They were predominantly self-taught photographers who did not play the role of traditional journalists, but instead approached their work as activists. Working for La Raza gave them a platform to amplify the Chicano voice in Los Angeles and their work for the newspaper was written from a Chicano perspective. In addition to documenting the Chicano movement, the staff members also played prominent roles in driving it, often organizing protests and campaigns.

Even during its peak years, La Raza usually operated as a small, tight-knit operation with around 20 staff members. In 1974, when La Raza Unida's efforts were at their peak in Los Angeles, La Raza's staff reached an all-time high of 41 members, but it fell back down to below 20 members within a year. After the discontinuation of the magazine, the staff continued to perform social and political activism in LA and around the U.S.

La Raza had three different editors during its lifetime. Risco, who edited the paper during its first two years, left in 1969, leaving the paper in the hands of Ruíz and Razo. Razo left in 1972 due to concerns he had that the paper's staff was becoming too radical.

Editing History
Year	Editor(s)
September 1967 - June 1969	Elizier Risco
June 1969 - April 1972	Raul Ruíz and Joe Razo
April 1972 - 1977	Raul Ruíz

== Legacy ==
From September 2017 - February 2018, the Autry Museum of the American West in Los Angeles held an exhibit celebrating La Raza's influence on Latino culture in Los Angeles. The exhibit, co-curated by Luis Garza and museum chief curator Amy Scott, was part of Pacific Standard Time: LA/LA, a sprawling project through which artistic and historical institutions in Southern California set up exhibitions celebrating Latino culture and influence in Los Angeles. The exhibit featured 200 of the most prominent photos from the publication and marked the first time La Raza's work had been displayed for the public in 40 years.

Following the exhibit, an exhibition catalogue titled La Raza was published to remember the 50-year anniversary of the newspaper and includes essays written from the previously mentioned curators Luis Garza and Amy Scott. The editor, Colin Gunckel writes on the methods La Raza photographers used to capture the riots, including photomontage and street photography.

=== La Raza Photography ===
La Raza photographers photographed the community to redefine the image of Chicano protestors. Photomontage was used in La Raza newspapers as a way to enlarge crowds while keeping more detailed people in the foreground. This was used to bring feelings of solidarity during protests. As Gunckel notes, "montage in La Raza postulated a power that resided with the people in open defiance of the state." Photos included groups of police at riots and their involvement in ending them. Photographers also captured the empty streets after protests to show the damage of how Chicana/o protestors were treated.
