= Gloria Arellanes =

American political activist (1946–2024)

- Born: April 26, 1946; East Los Angeles, California, United States
- Died: October 12, 2024 (aged 78)
- Occupations: Activist; speaker
- Organizations: Brown Berets; Las Adelitas de Aztlán

Gloria Arellanes (March 4, 1946 – October 12, 2024) was a political activist known for her involvement with the Brown Berets during the Chicano Movement and has been influential in the development of Chicana feminism. As the first female prime minister of the Brown Berets, Arellanes worked to include the Chicana perspective in fighting for Mexican rights in Los Angeles in the 1960s and 1970s.

Conflicts of covert "macho attitude" within the delegation of labor in the Brown Berets led Gloria Arellanes along with other female Brown Berets to leave the organization and create Las Adelitas de Aztlán. Similar to the Brown Berets, Las Adelitas de Aztlán strived to assist its community members in creating awareness for better bilingual education in Los Angeles as well as protesting against the Vietnam War. Arellanes was also a prominent figure in the National Chicano Moratorium Committee, leading Las Adelitas de Aztlán to participate in marches against the violence of the Vietnam War.

== Early life and education ==
Arellanes was born in East Los Angeles, and a few years later her family moved to El Monte, California. Gloria's father, César Barron Arellanes, was a Mexican immigrant. Her mother was Aurora Arellanes. Gloria identified her mother as being of Indigenous Mexican descent from present-day Azusa. William (Bill) Cesar was Gloria's brother.

Gloria attended El Monte High School from 1960 to 1964, which is where her political consciousness began to develop. Her high school had a large mix of white and Chicano population. The Chicanos, although from different barrios, often stuck together and supported each other. Fights would break out in her high school constantly until a counselor named John Bartan held a Human Relations Club where white and Latino kids could work through their problems. Through this engagement and community-building, her identity as a Chicana began to grow. She identified many racist aspects of her high school, including discriminatory arrests made in school, teachers ignoring Chicano/a students when they raised their hands, and tracking Chicano/a students into vocational classes. After graduating high school, Gloria enrolled in East Los Angeles College but quit after one year. She went on to become involved in community work and got a full-time job with the Neighborhood Adult Participation Project, an anti-poverty program where she organized Black and Chicano communities and worked on voter registration.

== Brown Berets ==
In 1967, Arellanes and some of her friends visited La Piranya, a coffeehouse owned and operated by the Brown Berets. Arellanes met future prime minister of the Brown Berets, David Sánchez, and was encouraged by Sánchez to join the Berets at the coffeehouse. She began attending community meetings and events, and eventually decided to join. In 1968, Arellanes was named the minister of finance and correspondence, the first female minister of the Brown Berets. Early in her career she represented the Brown Berets when they were awarded the Ghetto Freedom Award by the Greater Los Angeles Urban League in 1968.

The Brown Berets worked to raise their community by calling for improvement on education and employment, demanding more resources for the Chicano/a movement, and exposing police brutality against the Mexican-American people. The first important move the Brown Berets made was their involvement in the 1968 East L.A. blowouts, which Arellanes had been forced to sit out by her boss at the time. She was informed that her friend and companion Andrea Sánchez was arrested by Sergeant Arias of the Special Operation Conspiracy Force of LAPD under the assumption that he had arrested Arellanes.

Arellanes organized marches during her time with the Brown Berets in partnership with the East L.A. Blowouts, in opposition to policy brutality against Chicanos, and for El Barrio Free Clinic. In 1969, she arranged for the Brown Berets to use a tank for their float in the September 16 parade. She requested it without informing the clinic it would be used for Brown Berets because of the known sentiments against the Brown Berets. Arellanes was also in charge of fundraising for the Berets on a couple occasions. She organized a "Zoot Suit Party" where they made money selling beer to fund the Brown Berets' activities.

Arellanes, among many other women Berets, chiefly arranged and assembled the newsletter that went out for Mexicans and Chicanos to read, titled La Causa. However, limited resources and funds made the production and distribution of the paper difficult.

=== East L.A. Free Clinic / El Barrio Free Clinic ===
In 1969, David Sanchez brought the news about the Barrio Free Clinic which Arellanes was given the responsibility of coordinating. The Brown Berets created the East L.A. Free Clinic, later to be known as El Barrio Free Clinic, on Whittier Boulevard. Arellanes headed the clinic for the Brown Berets, partnering with professionals that offered medical services "including drug addiction counseling, immunizations, physical exams, STI screenings and even small surgical procedures." The clinic struggled to fundraise because of its casual approach in its "provided counseling for unwanted pregnancies." Though it funds were not always steady, the clinic provided a space where young people in L.A. felt safe in receiving important services, even giving comfort to those who were worried of attaining health services because of their legal status in the United States.

Coordinating El Barrio Free Clinic, Arellanes had helped better the name of the Brown Berets, who had been seen as an outrageous radical group, as many had viewed the Black Panthers during this time. In July 1969, Arellanes had become the official Clinic Director of the Barrio Free Clinic. El Barrio Free Clinic is what Arellanes called, "the most significant contribution of the East L.A. Brown Berets." While the clinic significantly aided the Brown Berets in their reputation within the community, it led to the departure of many female Brown Berets because of the gendered distribution of work that it came with. Arellanes faced conflict in her duty to maintain the family-friendly environment of the Clinic while the men of the organization used the Clinic as a location of socialization, where she would be forced to remove their mess frequently to preserve its orderly image for its patients.

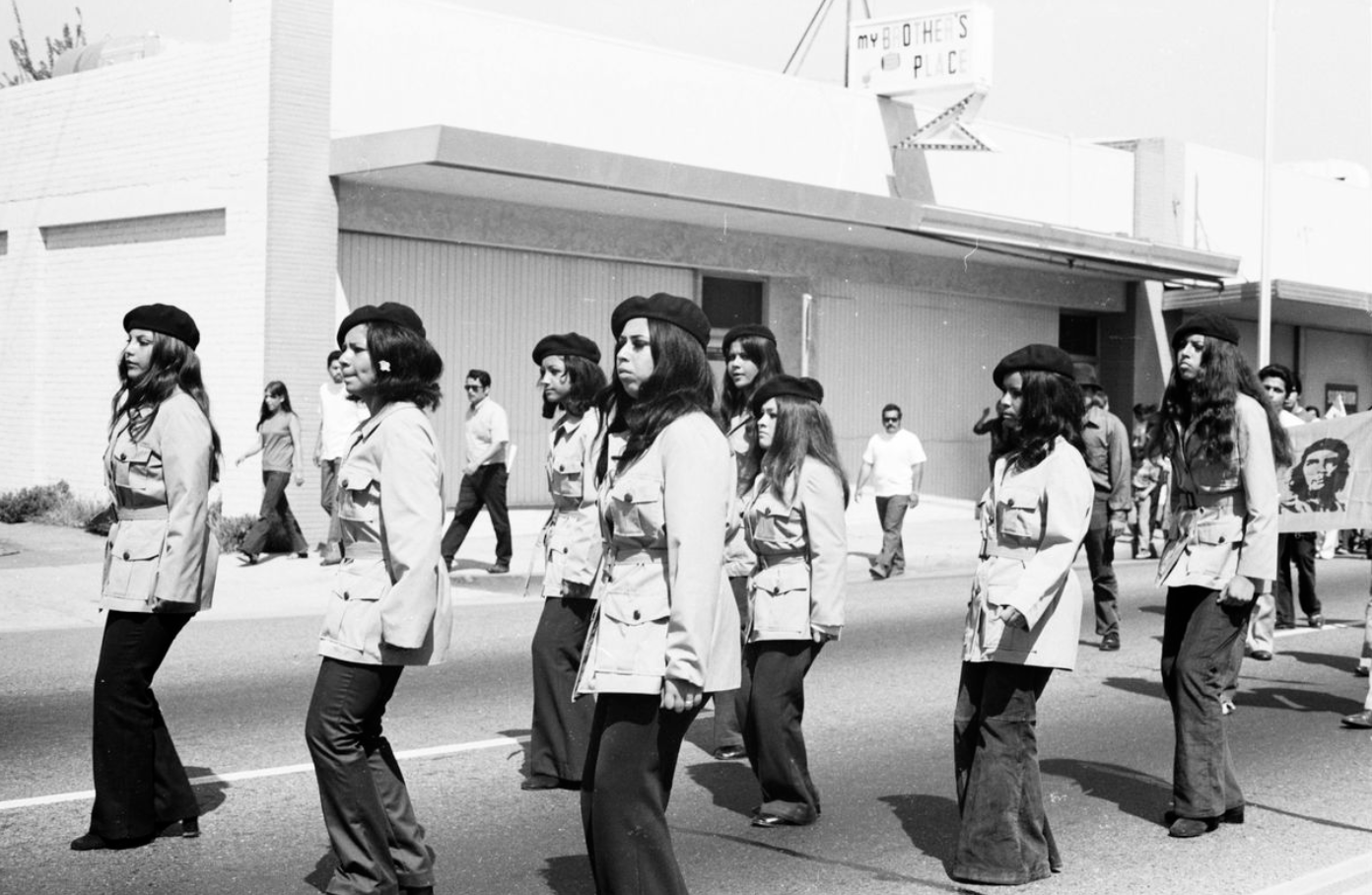
Brown Beret women march in step, 1970.

While they got along for the most part, the women were expected to work the clinic and the men took little part in volunteering and participating in the daily functions of the clinic. The Beret women were not initially aware of their "second-class" membership within the organization because they "never openly expressed macho attitude," but the clinic enabled the women to recognize the difference in the roles of the men and women in the Brown Berets. Arellanes mentions in her testimony that many of the women left the Brown Berets around the same time in February 1970 due to what they saw as gender inequality perpetuated by the male Brown Berets in the Chicano movement. She said this was because they "found that the Brown Beret men have oppressed us more than the pig system has." They left by verbal resignation but wrote letters to other chapters explaining their reasons for leaving. The letter was signed, "Con Che!" due to Che Guevara's stance on equality among the sexes.

== Las Adelitas de Aztlán ==
After leaving the Brown Berets, Arellanes, alongside Gracie and Hilda Reyes, Andrea and Esther Sánchez, Lorraine Escalante, Yolanda Solis, and Arlene Sánchez, formed a short-lived Chicana group named "Las Adelitas de Aztlán" in 1970. The group combined its activism for the Mexican-American and the women, focusing on women's rights for Chicanas. The group takes its name from the revolutionary woman who fought alongside the men in Mexico's revolution, La Adelita. "Las Adelitas de Aztlán" were a combined group of women from the Brown Berets and other similar organizations created to support one another in their goals to fight for Chicano rights and aid one another in their obstacles as women in the Chicano movement. The goal of this group was not to be a formal organization, but rather a "discussion and support group."

== National Chicano Moratorium ==
While in the process of leaving the Brown Berets, Arellanes joined the National Chicano Moratorium Committee in 1969. Anti-war sentiments towards the Vietnam War were increasing amongst the Mexican-American youth in Los Angeles as they rallied to focus on the social justice issues at home, rather than the war in Vietnam. Led by co-chairs, Ramsés Noriega and Rosalio Muñoz, the East L.A. demonstrations formed in protest of the war in Vietnam and injustices it placed on the Mexican-American. In their first demonstration, Arellanes was still in the Brown Berets and was asked to attain permission from the LAPD for the Moratorium to march down the streets of East Los Angeles.

In attendance of these East Los Angeles demonstrations, Las Adelitas de Aztlán, led by Gloria Arellanes, seen to be the first instance of a Chicana group protesting in their own right. The women marched in the second moratorium, the "March in the Rain" of February 28, 1970 brandishing white crosses of Chicano men from L.A. that had been killed in the war, Arellanes toting a cross with the name of her own cousin, Jimmy Vásquez.

=== Chicano Moratorium march of August 29, 1970 ===
In preparation for what came to be the largest march by the Chicano Moratorium, with between 20,000 and 30,000 participants, Arellanes enjoyed her heavy involvement in its planning. On the Moratorium Committee Arellanes would handle clerical work like taking phone calls and also outreach in the North California Bay Area region. She traveled to the Bay Area to motivate Northern Californian Chicanos to participate in the Moratorium and to community centers in East L.A. to hand out flyers. In her tasks of managing attendance, Arellanes connected thousands of out-of-state attendees with housing accommodations for the moratorium.

The march of August 29, 1970, in the chaos that ensued with the police intervention, resulted in arrests and deaths that drove Arellanes away from participating in the moratorium. After having an experience as a target of a tear gas canister, Arellanes fled from the stage of the demonstration and went back to the Brown Beret Office. This event marked the end of Arellanes' involvement with the Moratorium Committee and the Chicano Movement altogether.

== La Clínica Familiar del Barrio ==
Gloria Arellanes found a passion for helping those in her community through the Barrio Free Clinic in her time as a Brown Beret and opened another clinic after her departure from the Chicanx organizations with former female Brown Berets and Adelitas de Aztlán. La Clínica Familiar del Barrio opened on Atlantic Boulevard on March 15, 1971. The clinic was coordinated by Arellanes and supplied free medical services to the community, as the Brown Berets' Barrio Free Clinic shut down after the withdrawal of the Chicana women from the Brown Berets. The success of the clinic gladdened Arellanes, though she would resign from the clinic in 1972 in response to the "pressure from some board members" of the clinic. La Clínica Familiar del Barrio continues to service the East Los Angeles community as AltaMed.

== Tongva rights activism ==
Arellanes' focus shifted to the civil rights activism of the Native American people. Her knowledge in coordinating the free clinics in East L.A. aided her role as a community health advocate as well as a speaker on Tongva issues.

== Personal life ==
Arellanes lived in El Monte, California, and had two sons and a grandson.
