= Salazar Park =

Park in Los Angeles, California, United States

Coordinates: 34.0232°N 118.19033°W

- Interactive map of Salazar Park
- Location: 3864 Whittier Blvd. Los Angeles, CA 90023

Ruben F. Salazar Park (formerly Laguna Park) is a park in East Los Angeles, Los Angeles County, California. The park is located at 3864 Whittier Boulevard, about 2 miles (3.2 km) east of Downtown Los Angeles, and managed by the Los Angeles County Department of Parks and Recreation.

Laguna Park was renamed Ruben F. Salazar Park in honor of the journalist Ruben F. Salazar, who was murdered by East LA police enforcement in Silver Dollar, a coffee shop near the park, during the 1970 National Chicano Moratorium march. Salazar was a well-known journalist for the Los Angeles Times; he leveraged his profession to amplify the Chicano social justice movement. The park is a historical site of Chicano activism against Mexican-American participation in the Vietnam War. Currently, Salazar Park continues to serve as a Latiné community landscape and recreational site, offering diverse amenities and artistically reflecting, through indoor and outdoor murals, Latiné resilience and the continued fight for justice.

== History of the park's establishment and name ==
Before the park's construction, a Jewish Hospital was located on the site. However, in 1938, the land that in 1940 became Laguna Park was purchased by the Los Angeles County from Cedars of Lebanon Hospital.In 1969, a building for senior citizens opened at the park. A year later, on September 17, 1970, Laguna Park was renamed Salazar Park in response to the murder of Ruben Salazar during the 1970 Chicano Moratorium protest.

== Chicano Moratorium ==
On August 29, 1970, united by common goals, between 20,000 and 30,000 demonstrators gathered for what was, at the time, the largest Mexican American march in U.S. history. They began at East 3rd Street by the Los Angeles Civic Center and marched to their final destination, Laguna Park. Following this route, the demonstrators, including women and children, covered almost 3 miles over more than an hour. A leading motivator of the march was the overrepresentation of Chicanos in the Vietnam War, where a disproportionate number of Mexican Americans were drafted and lost their lives. The Chicano community in the U.S was devastated by the high Chicano casualty rate overseas. It was reported that Chicanos accounted for 22% of total casualties in the Vietnam War, even though at that moment, in the early 1970s, Chicanos were only 5% of the total U.S. population. Chicanos risked their lives abroad and received scant recognition during the Vietnam War. Because of this, the Moratorium sought to encourage Chicanos to remain in their places of origin to fight for their community's rights and for social justice.

The march was intended to portray a positive and festive atmosphere, highlighting the Chicano community's resistance and unity. In fact, many described the march as a parade.Throughout the march, the crowd was chanting "Chicano Power" and "Viva la Raza" and holding banners, such as "Brown is Beautiful".For most of the Moratorium, this peaceful climate prevailed because even after arriving at Laguna Park, the demonstrators were cheerfully singing, Folkloric dancers were moving along, and others were simply relaxing on the park's grass. However, shortly after they arrived at the park, the fiesta atmosphere became a chaotic battlefield.

The LA County Sheriff's Department responded to a theft report at Green Mill Liquor Store, adjacent to Laguna Park.Many Chicanos entered the store to make a purchase, but it was reported that they had supposedly left without paying for their items. However, there is controversy on who notified the authorities because the store salesperson denied calling the sheriff's station for assistance on the matter. More than 40 sheriff deputies arrived at the site, and what was intended to be a joyous event quickly escalated into a violent, war-like scene at Laguna Park. Arguing that the anti-war march was an unlawful assembly, multiple officers were beating individuals and throwing tear gas at people, including children, without any warning. As an act of self-defense and confused by the strong presence of police authorities, the protestors started fleeing the park.Young activist Carmen Ramirez, a student at Loyola Law School, escaped Laguna Park and took refuge at East LA Doctors Hospital.The clashes with law enforcement led to property damage; buildings were set on fire.The violent scene resulted in more than a hundred arrests, around a dozen injuries, and three fatalities, among them journalist Ruben Salazar.

== Ruben Salazar's death ==
Serving as a voice for the Chicano community, forty-two-year-old journalist Ruben F. Salazar found his fate during his last report assignment for the Chicano Moratorium. Salazar was born in Ciudad Juárez, Mexico, and later became a U.S. citizen. He overcame generational barriers by working as a well-known journalist for the Los Angeles Times. Proud of his roots and community, he consistently wrote columns in the LA Times addressing issues concerning the Chicano community. Examples of his columns include: "Who Is A Chicano? And What Is It the Chicanos Want?" and "Chicanos Reminds Blacks They Are Not the Only Minority". Besides being a highly respected reporter, he was also the news director for KMEX-TV, a Spanish-language station which evolved into today's well-known Univision network.

Although this was the biggest Mexican-American march in U.S. history, this reporting assignment appeared to be no different because Salazar had previous experience covering other Chicano marches and participated in the 1965 Dominican Republic Revolution coverage.However, after walking alongside Whittier Boulevard to survey demonstrators, he entered Silver Dollar cafe, near Laguna Park, to make a purchase and to briefly rest, not knowing he would not come out alive. Responding to an unverified report of two armed men entering the bar/coffee shop, officers fatally wounded Salazar using a 10-inch Flite-Rite tear gas projectile. Salazar and the rest of the customers were not given a warning about the tear-gas, showcasing law enforcement's violent response to the Chicanos' peaceful protest. Chicanos compared Salazar’s death at Laguna Park to the assassinations of Dr. Martin Luther King Jr., a leading figure in the Civil Rights Movement, and former president John F. Kennedy, framing Ruben F. Salazar as another symbol of the Chicano movement.

== Greater cultural and historical significance ==
Salazar Park is situated on a historically important location: Whittier Boulevard. The boulevard was recognized as a busy and congested shopping street.This arterial street was central to other Chicano movements seeking visibility and representation. For example, ASCO, a Chicano art collective, staged art performances on the boulevard to actively protest against police brutality and Mexican Americans' participation in the Vietnam War. Examples of ASCO performances staged in this thoroughfare include Stations of the Cross (1971) and First Supper (After a Major Riot) (1974). In Stations of the Cross, the performers walked along Whittier Boulevard until they reached a military recruiting station. First Supper (After a Major Riot) performance included a Whittier Boulevard sign in the background. Along with Salazar Park, these two ASCO examples highlight the significance of Whittier Boulevard to the Chicano community and the Moratorium organizers' strategic decision in making the park their final destination, since the street would capture public and media attention. Since the performances took place after 1970, this sheds light on the Whittier Boulevard's role in propelling Chicanos' social justice movement and motivating continued activism. In fact, Harry Gamboa Jr., was at Salazar Park during the Chicano Moratorium, and later said that the best way to respond to the violent police brutality was through cultural and creative means; thus, indirectly arguing that the Moratorium motivated the creation of ASCO. Furthermore, another main ASCO leader, Glugio "Gronk" Nicandro, emphasized that a major cause of ASCO was the same one that motivated the Chicano Moratorium: Chicanos' overrepresentation in Vietnam War battlefields and underrepresentation in media outlets.

== Recent updates ==
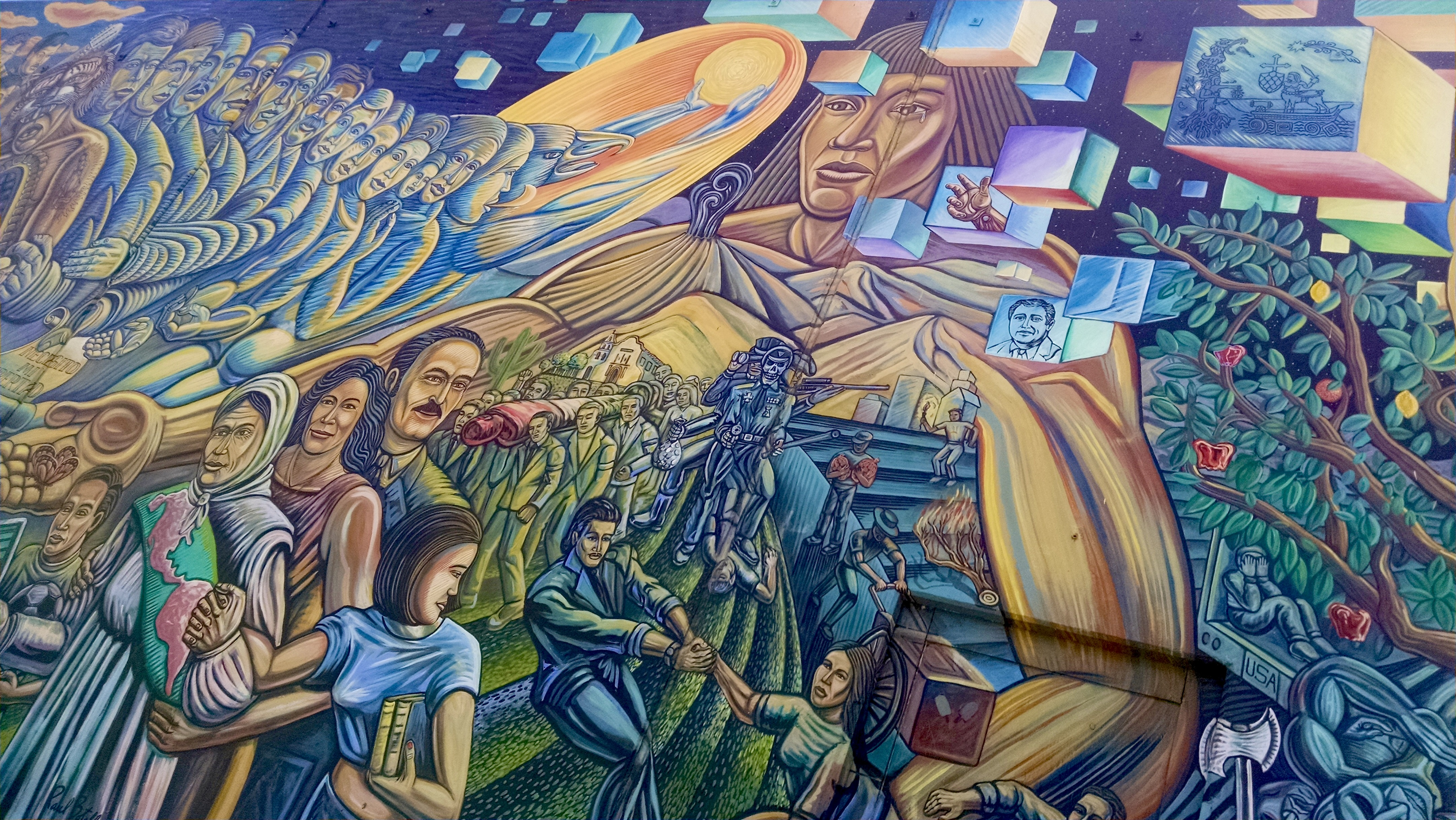
Photograph of "The Wall That Speaks, Sings, and Shouts," a work by community muralist Paul Botello. This mural is located on the exterior wall of the Salazar Park recreation center.

More than 40 years later, Salazar Park continues to be a place of Latinx community building and connection. In 2001, Los Tigres del Norte, a Mexican norteño band, commissioned the mural The Wall That Speaks, Sings, and Shouts made by community art muralist Paul Botello. The mural is located on one of the park's recreation exterior walls.Through the extensive area, the wall alludes to the Chicano Moratorium by depicting Ruben F. Salazar, marching men, women, and children, and police enforcement. Additionally, the mural includes an abundance of symbolic components, including what appears to be a family, a student with a laptop sending the message "De Paisano a Paisano", a sign reading "Necesito mi Libertad", a map of the Americas, and many more details. Through symbolism, this mural in Laguna Park addresses what the Chicano Moratorium fought for in the 1960s: visibility and representation. Furthermore, the mural portrays past and current struggles and values of the Latinx community, such as themes of resistance, immigration, scientific advances, and family life. Additionally, Salazar Park is home to indoor murals. For example, there is an indoor mural in the seniors' center, featuring well-known Mexican-American figures, including Selena Quintanilla.

More recently, on August 29, 2014, the Los Angeles County placed a plaque in Salazar Park in continued honor and remembrance of 44 years since Ruben Salazar's death. Salazar Park remains a colorful park with a strong Latinx presence. This is a place of convergence for seniors, adults, and children. In fact, the park has multiple areas dedicated solely to seniors, including senior centers, senior clubs, and senior meal programs. The park's amenities are tailored for families and children; they can benefit from parenting classes, children's play areas, teen clubs, and after-school programs. Additional facilities include tennis courts, computer labs, picnic tables, and the park also offers free lunches for children in the summer.
