= Rosalio Muñoz =

Mexican American activist

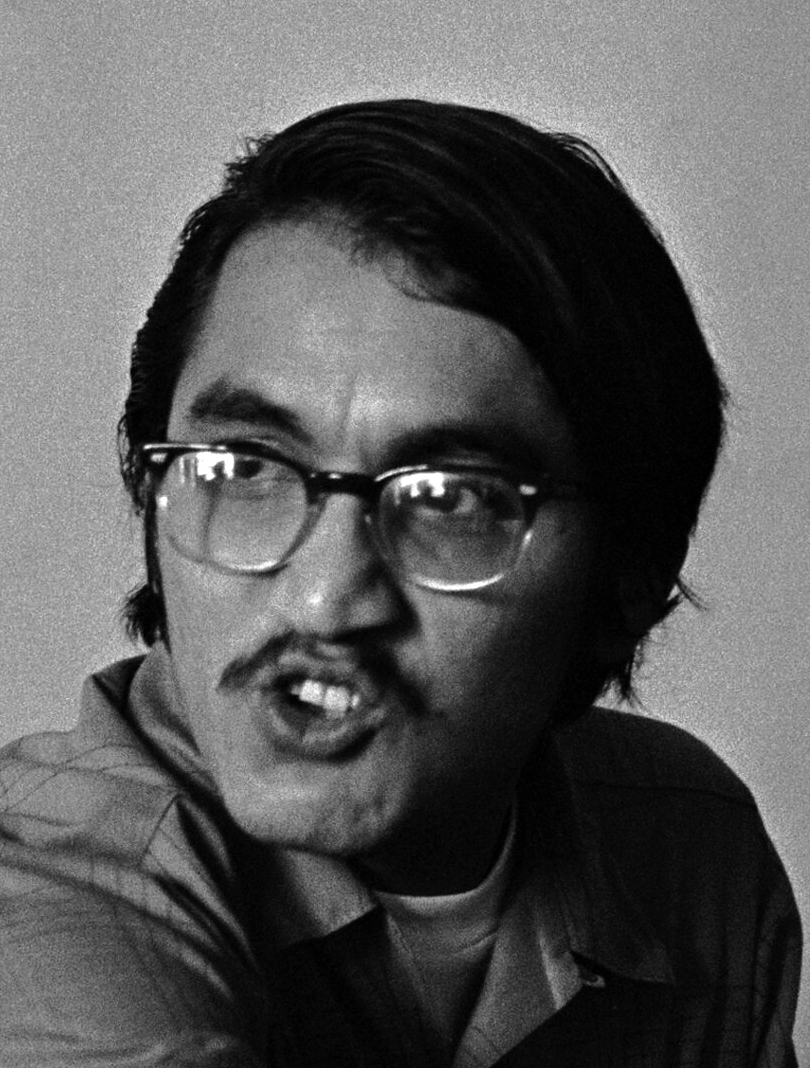
Muñoz in 1971

Rosalio Muñoz (born 1938) is a Chicano activist who is most recognized for his anti-war and anti-police brutality organizing with the Chicano Moratorium against the Vietnam War. On August 29, 1970, Muñoz and fellow Chicano activist Ramses Noriega organized a peaceful march in East Los Angeles, California in which over 30,000 Mexican Americans were in attendance to protest the war in Vietnam. The event became a site of police brutality after sheriffs attacked and tear gassed the crowd, leading to the deaths of three people, including Muñoz's friend and Chicano journalist Ruben Salazar.

== Early life and activism ==
Muñoz was a University of California, Los Angeles student who gained attention because of his position as class president, his strong position on Chicano politics, and his nonviolent protest ethics. Muñoz developed his Chicano identity and politics through inspiration from the Chicano Blowouts and in conversation with other Chicanos such as Moctesuma Esparza. Muñoz describes how he became attracted to the idea of Chicano nationalism through influences from Reies Lopez Tijerina, but "never became obsessed about the idea of the original homeland of the Aztecs somehow being the Chicano homeland as well," or the concept of Aztlán. Instead, Muñoz became more focused on what he referred to as creating more "concrete and practical social change" through activism: "I never fully became an ideologue."

Muñoz was appointed as the United Mexican American Students (UMAS) student-faculty representative and chaired the committee on Chicano and Black student recruitment at UCLA. He advocated for the need "to recruit Chicano and Black students who might not meet the requirements of the UC system, and specifically at UCLA, but who showed promise and potential," including many students who had participated in the walkouts. Muñoz notes how the school wanted to recruit more "minority students" yet wanted to maintain the requirements of high GPA and SAT test scores, yet expressed that it was these stringent requirements which were actively excluding Chicano and Black students at schools such as East L.A. High School. His recommendation was adopted as the High Potential Program.

The increasing visibility of Chicano student activism led to racist backlash, which eventually led to Muñoz resigning from student government. However, when the president later resigned, this opened a spot for Muñoz to run for the position, which he did with Ramses Noriega as his campaign manager. Muñoz notes how this was a part of his identity formation: "I ran as a Chicano. I was no longer Ross Muñoz. I was Rosalio Muñoz." He ran on a progressive platform, advocating for campus support for the United Farm Workers, disarming campus police, rent control in the apartments surrounding campus, and against the U.S. war in Vietnam. Muñoz won with over 60 percent of the vote and became the first Chicano student president at UCLA (1968–69).

His papers currently rest with the Online Archives of California.

== Chicano Moratorium ==
On August 29, 1970, Muñoz recalled that the march of 30,000, which included "a Black delegation from the Che Lumumba branch of the Communist Party; a representative from the Young Lords; a Puerto Rican youth group similar to the Brown Berets; and Anglo-American members of the local Peace Action Council," was being closely watched by the Los Angeles County Sheriff's Department, who described it as "boisterous" and "cheerful." Muñoz received a hug from Ruben Salazar, who congratulated him for the success of the march: "You did it. You really did it." Organizers and other participants shared in a feeling of accomplishment over the event. Muñoz and Ramsés Noriega had planned the event as a part of a series of protests throughout the Southwestern United States that would eventually culminate in the East Los Angeles march in August. The march was described by scholar Lorena Oropeza as "one of the largest assemblages of Mexican Americans ever."

Muñoz opened the post-march rally stating, "A year ago, when we started organizing against the war, there were very few of us," but now "a powerful call for social change" had been created. Muñoz proclaimed that "we have to begin organizing on the issue of police brutality, we have to bring an end to this oppression." In a bit of tragic irony, as noted by Oropeza, "shortly afterward, the bulk of demonstrators were running from the park in order to flee an assault by sheriff's deputies."

== Sabotage by police informer ==
Muñoz was sabotaged and ousted as leader of the Chicano Moratorium by Eustacio (Frank) Martinez, who was 21 years old at the time. At a press conference at the Los Angeles Press Club in 1972, Martinez admitted that he had worked as a police informer among Chicano activists in Texas and California. Martinez stated that he had become an informant and agent provocateur for the Alcohol, Tobacco and Firearms Enforcement Division (ATF) of the U.S. Treasury Department after being arrested for possession of an illegal weapon in July 1969. Martinez was approached by an ATF agent referred to as "Tito Garcia" who stated that he "would not be charged for the Federal Firearms violation if he would work as informant and agent provocateur for that agency." He carried out assignments of infiltrating the Mexican American Youth Organization (MAYO) and the Brown Berets in Houston and Kingsville. Under the instruction of ATF agents Fernando Ramos and Jim Riggs, Martinez committed illegal acts "which allowed the police to make arrests and raid headquarters of the Chicano Moratorium Committee."

Martinez spread rumors about Muñoz, who was chairman of the Chicano Moratorium Committee, that he was "too soft" and "not militant enough." This led to the ousting of Muñoz, who was replaced by Martinez himself in November 1970. Martinez continued as chairman until March 1971. In August 1971, on the anniversary of the Chicano Moratorium, Martinez was charged with inciting a riot and interfering with a police officer, orders he had received from the ATF. However, Martinez stated that Riggs appeared and attempted to force him to plead guilty, "with the intention of sending him back to Texas." Martinez went public at this time, stating that he did so "for the simple reason that I was beginning to be aware that our people were being railroaded, and for another thing, I was being sold out. I had good intentions for working with the government. I believed in it. When I began to see how corrupt the government was in destroying my people, I couldn't see it anymore." Martinez remarked, "[I]t does not pay to be an informer, because when they no longer need you, they'll frame you."

== 1971 letter to the Los Angeles Times ==
Muñoz authored a letter to the editor of the Los Angeles Times in 1971, "in response to your [the Times'] plea for some social facts to understand the strained situation between Chicanos and the police." In the letter, Muñoz details how "the current conflict between Chicanos and the police is a political confrontation that historically has its roots in the mid-1800s." He described the mass deportation of Mexican Repatriation (1929–36) by border patrol and law enforcement as a critical event which "strained and intensified the anger of people of Mexican descent toward the law and law enforcement." Muñoz also recorded how the Zoot Suit Riots (1943) were framed by the press as being initiated by the zoot suiters, who applied a "historically permanent label that implied 'the Mexicans did it,' thereby simultaneously protecting the servicemen from public ridicule." Muñoz then cites a police department's "biological basis" report, which stated that "people of Mexican descent were biologically prone to criminal behavior."

Muñoz described that Chicano protest action against discriminatory educational institutions, the Catholic Church, and the U.S. government's involvement in Vietnam has always been "met with police-initiated political violence." As a result, Muñoz described that Chicanos as well as the Black community are living in a "totalitarian-like atmosphere within a broader Los Angeles community," especially in the absence of political representation. Muñoz warned against the rise of the police in the United States as a "more powerful political force in our increasingly less-free democratic society," citing the Skolnic Report to the U.S. National Commission of the Causes and Prevention of Violence, which determined that "the ranks of law enforcement have become an ultraconservative social force which shrilly protest positive change." As a result, Muñoz concluded that "rather than calling off our protest, and returning to a life of fear under police totalitarian aggression we have to continue to protest for purposes of survival."

== Additional resources ==
- Online Archive of California, Rosalio Muñoz papers, 1938-2012
- KCET, 31 August 2011, The Muñoz Family: Civil Rights Activists
