= Las Adelitas de Aztlán =

Mexican American female civil rights organization

Las Adelitas de Aztlán was a short-lived Mexican American female civil rights organization created by Gloria Arellanes, Gracie and Hilda Reyes in 1970. Gloria Arellanes, Gracie, and Hilda Reyes were all former members of the Brown Berets, another Mexican American Civil rights organization that had operated concurrently during the 1960s and 1970s in the California area. The founders left the Brown Berets due to enlarging gender discrepancies and disagreements that caused much alienation amongst their female members. The Las Adelitas De Aztlan advocated for Mexican-American Civil rights, better conditions for workers, protested police brutality and advocated for women's rights for the Latino community. The organization's name was a tribute to Mexican female soldiers or soldaderas who fought during the early twentieth-century Mexican Revolution.

== Inspiration ==
Throughout the Chicano Movement during the 1960s and 1970s, Mexican American civil rights movements were at their peak, and one of the most prominent was the Brown Berets. The Brown Berets expressed a combination of civic activism and cultural and ethnic unity, but with elements of militarism to advocate for farm workers' rights, educational reform, anti-war activism, and to organize against police brutality. Female members of the Brown Berets served as a valuable asset to the organization and " gave the organization stability by fundraising, answering phone calls, writing letters, pasting up and writing for the newspaper, and running free clinics. They also became instrumental in organizing the marches against the Vietnam War." All three founders of Las Adelitas de Aztlán, Gloria Arellanes, Gracie and Hilda Reyes, had formerly been a part of the Brown Berets, but had felt that the male-dominated leadership was ignoring the demands and concerns of their female members. Though it was clear that women played a critical role in the organization some felt that the secretarial and clerical positions had devalued them as members. With the rise of second-wave feminism in the 1960s, women across the racial spectrum began expressing gender consciousness that rejected notions of passiveness or submission to male domination in civil rights circles. Many would even break away entirely to start their organizations. In February 1970 Arellanes, then the minister of correspondence and finance for the East Los Angeles chapter had handed in her letter of resignation to the Brown Berets's Minister of Education Aron Mangancilla stating "There has been a great exclusion on behalf of the male segment and failure of the ministers to communicate with us, among many, many other things." Arellanes had set a precedent that had echoed along with other second-wave feminists at the time that, despite being a member of an oppressed class of people, the female component of the Mexican American community had often been sidelined via male dominance. Shortly after her resignation, Arellanes began organizing a new group at the Euclid Heights Center in East Los Angeles and advertised it as an organization where Chicanas could express themselves and their ideas or where the dissatisfied could find a place to be included and welcomed. Gloria Arellanes discusses the reasoning of why she named the group Las Adelitas de Aztlán, saying in the book The Chicano Movement Testimonios Of The Movement, "I had come to learn more about the history of the Mexican Revolution of 1910 and was fascinated by the image of La Adelita, the female revolutionary who fought in the revolution… This was part of the Chicana search for historical role models." She continues to speak about the importance of Las Adelitas de Aztlán, saying that the group helped to give birth to Chicana feminism. As a group, Las Adelitas de Aztlán discussed how they were treated as women and talked about Machismo, specifically the macho mentality of Mexican American males. The group adopted the slogan: "Porque somos una familia de hermana (Because we are a family of sisters)".

== Gloria Arellanes's background ==
Gloria Arellanes was born in East Los Angeles on March 4, 1946. Throughout her early life, she became accustomed to the systemic racism and discrimination that had plagued the Mexican American community for decades. The post-World War II political economy had caused great demographic shifts in the Los Angeles area. It even allowed some Mexican American families like hers to have access to social mobility and middle-class lifestyles. However, many of these changes caused tension between Whites and Mexican Americans, and increased clashes between the two communities occurred. Arellanes experienced these tensions first-hand and sought community organization and guidance as a way to find a sense of security and comfort from police brutality and vigilante attacks. Arellanes later expressed that "I got involved with community services here with Chicano groups… we stuck together because there were race riots in the high school I went to, El Monte High School, and the police would come into the halls of the high school on their motorcycles and just arrest the Chicanos. They never arrested the white students". [3] For these reasons, Arellanes looked toward the Brown Berets for a sense of structure, security, and community organization that many other young Mexican Americans were striving for. Arellanes recalls, "There was something there that attracted us, and so I wanted to know more”.

== Important contributions ==
The Las Adelitas de Aztlan advocated heavily for women's reproductive rights and care, such as having access to free or reduced birth control, abortions, sex education, and even childcare. Much of this stemmed from creating health clinics across the American Southwest in Mexican-American communities. While under the banner of the Brown Berets, Arellanes worked closely in establishing the barrio Free Clinic in East Los Angeles in 1969, one of the first free clinics in a Spanish-speaking neighborhood in Los Angeles. Establishing free clinics was important for Arellanes, and she would carry on this sentiment into the Las Adelitas de Aztlan. The group would attend the Conferencia de Mujeres por la Raza or National Chicana Conference, the first of its kind in 1971 in Houston on May 28–30, 1971. Here, along with other Mexican-American civil rights organizations, Chicana women "gathered to organize stronger positions regarding women's roles. Gender discrimination, abortion, and birth control were given as much importance at the conference as inadequate educational opportunities, racism, welfare support, and employment discrimination, issues always at the heart of the Mexican-American civil-rights agenda. In addition, conference speakers urged the participants to work to change society."

== Expressions of femininity ==
The rise of Second-wave feminism coincided with that of the civil rights movements of the 1960s and 1970s, and would have a critical impact on the creation of Las Adelitas de Aztlán. The organization's goal, alongside the promotion of Mexican-American civil rights, was to provide a safe space, or a location for female expression. The Chicana feminist ideology that took hold during this time aligned itself with American East Coast interpretations of femininity. It denounced patriarchal male domination of women, both in private and public life. It also demanded accountability for actions that hindered the ability of female community members from having access to occupational, educational, political, and social opportunities and expression. However, women in the Mexican-American community faced unique challenges as members of a historically oppressed class of citizens, and focused on issues that carried with them racial and ethnic components. Women such as Gloria Arellanes, Gracie and Hilda Reyes often worked in concert with the larger Chicano civil rights movement in order to achieve their goals. The coordination of both males and females in the Mexican-American community allowed "Chicana women to find a collective voice through feminism and began to question machismo (sexist) attitudes, articulating their own criticisms and concerns involving issues of gender and sexuality, and organizing around these issues." Some of the motives of the organization's founders stressed that they did not intend to reveal the Brown Berets. However, some of their contemporaries felt it was a direct challenge to the Brown Berets as an institution. Arellanes argued that, " We envision strong women who would be supportive and always back one another up. Was it a feminist group?...I didn't call myself a feminist, nor did the other beret women, but in retrospect we were feminist in fact and in action".

== Expressions of Chicano Nationalism ==
The American civil rights period was a critical stepping stone for the Mexican American community to carve out a sense of cultural or Chicano nationalism that would be used as a platform to create a shared identity and respect. Creating a shared identity was important for the Chicano movement as a whole; as a result, the Las Adelitas de Aztlán would be used to express these ideas. The organization's name was chosen carefully to achieve this goal, as "a feminist symbol of the Mexican Revolution, La Adelita was the name of a woman soldier, a soldadera, who followed the troops, helped set up camp, and cooked for the soldiers." Referring to the Mexican Revolution, it invoked nationalist sentiment amongst Mexican-Americans by appealing to a history where the Mexican people fought to preserve their way of life, and also the fight against tyranny or persecution. In addition, making specific references to female soldiers was also deliberate to promote feminist ideology in the group and elsewhere. The image of the soldiers portrayed women as strong, brave, independent, and able to take on any task a man could do. The name Aztlan has an indigenous origin, but was also critical in creating nationalist sentiment. The Mexican-American community also recognized its Spanish and Indian past, and groups such as Las Adelitas de Aztlán would use it as a way to create a nationalist appeal. In Chicano Folklore and history, "Aztlan is the mythical place of origin of the Aztec peoples...In Chicano folklore, Aztlan is often appropriated as the name for that portion of Mexico that was taken over by the United States after the Mexican-American War of 1846, in the belief that this greater area represents the point of parting of the Aztec migrations."

== See also ==
- Latina lesbian organizations in the United States
