= Chicano Moratorium =

Anti-Vietnam War movement organized by Mexican-American activist groups (1960s-70s)

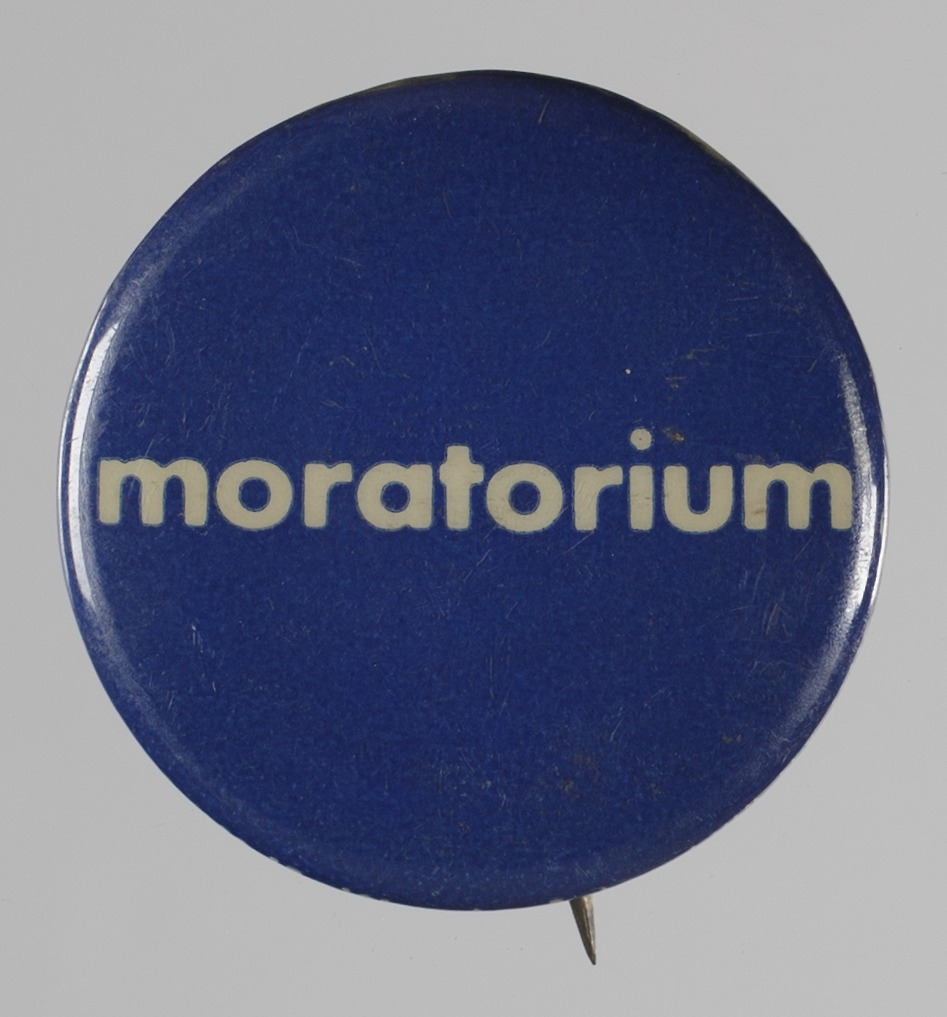
1969 Moratorium pinback button

The Chicano Moratorium, formally known as the National Chicano Moratorium Committee Against The Vietnam War, was a movement of Chicano anti-war activists that built a broad-based coalition of Mexican-American groups to organize opposition to the Vietnam War. Led by activists from local colleges and members of the Brown Berets, a group with roots in the high school student movement that staged the East L.A. Walkouts in 1968, the coalition peaked with an August 29, 1970 march in East Los Angeles that drew 30,000 demonstrators. The march was described by scholar Lorena Oropeza as "one of the largest assemblages of Mexican Americans ever." It was the largest anti-war action taken by any single ethnic group in the USA. It is the second largest protest led by Mexican-Americans in U.S. history, following the massive U.S. immigration reform protests of 2006.

The event was reportedly watched by the Los Angeles FBI office, who later "refused to release the entire contents" of their documentation and activity. The Chicano Moratorium march in East L.A. was organized by Chicano activists Ramsés Noriega and Rosalio Muñoz. Muñoz was the leader of the Chicano Moratorium Committee until November 1970, when he was ousted by Eustacio (Frank) Martinez, a police informant and agent provocateur for the Alcohol, Tobacco and Firearms Enforcement Division (ATF) of the U.S. Treasury Department, who committed illegal acts to allow the police to raid the headquarters of the committee and make arrests. Muñoz had returned as co-chair of the Moratorium in February 1971.

== Background ==
The Chicano Moratorium was a movement of Chicano activists that organized anti-Vietnam War demonstrations and activities in Mexican American communities throughout the Southwest and elsewhere from November 1969 through August 1971. There was a common anti-war sentiment growing among the Mexican American community that was made evident by a multitude of demonstrators chanting, "Our struggle is not in Vietnam but in the movement for social justice at home," which was a key slogan of the movement. It was coordinated by the National Chicano Moratorium Committee (NCMC) and led largely by activists from the Chicano student movement (United Mexican American Students, or UMAS) with David Sanchez and the Brown Beret organization.

Draft resistance was a prevalent form of protest for Chicano anti-war activists, as it was for many youth at the time. Rosalio Muñoz, Ernesto Vigil, and Salomon Baldengro were some of the notable Chicanos who actively refused induction for the draft.“ For refusing to cooperate they faced a felony charge that could incur a minimum of five years prison time, $10,000, or both.

In a statement written by Rosalio Munoz called CHALE CON EL DRAFT he brings an awareness to Anti-war sentiments during his draft induction ceremony by stating, "Today, the sixteenth of September, the day of independence for all Mexican peoples, I declare my independence of the Selective Service System. I accuse the government of the United States of America of genocide against the Mexican people. Specifically, I accuse the draft, the entire social, political, and economical system of the United States of America, of Creating a funnel which shoots Mexican youth into Viet Nam to be killed and to kill innocent men, women, and children. . . and of drafting their laws so that many more Chicanos are sent to Vietnam, in proportion to the total population, then they send off their own white youth..."

Corky Gonzales wrote in an address, "My feelings and emotions are aroused by the complete disregard of our present society for the rights, dignity and lives of not only people of other nations but of our own unfortunate young men who die for an abstract cause in a war that cannot be honestly justified by any of our present leaders".

The Berets were opposed to the war because many Chicanos were being killed and wounded in disproportionate numbers in comparison to the population at an estimated rate of double the American population. War casualties with distinctive Spanish names were recorded at 19% compared with the 11.8% Spanish surname population of Southwestern America in 1960. Many young Chicanos felt they had become trapped in the draft system because they could only escape the draft if they were enrolled in school. Unfortunately, Chicano students had high dropout rates and very few made it to college, rendering them ideal for the draft. The Vietnam War also diverted Federal funds away from social programs that aided poverty stricken barrios in the US. In several visits to colleges in Claremont, CA, Rosalío Muñoz discovered that Draft Boards allegedly attempted to discourage Chicano students from attending college by falsely telling them that student deferments were not available. During this time, many Chicano families opposed the war because they felt it fragmented their families.

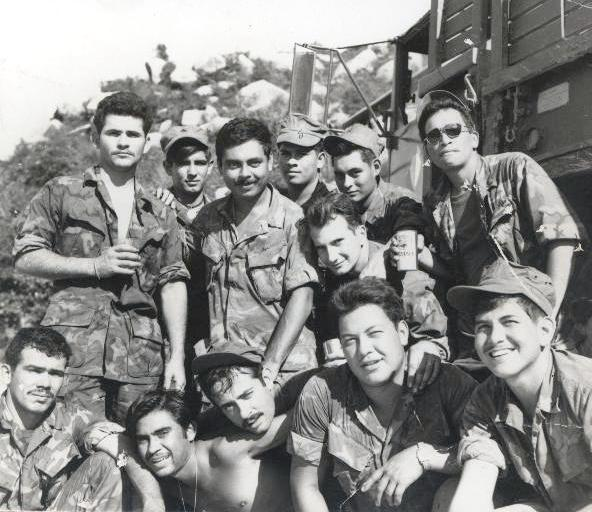
Mexican-American Marines in Vietnam, ca. 1970-1972 23.3% of all Southwestern Marine Corps casualties had distinctive Spanish surnames

The committee organized its first demonstration on December 20, 1969, in East Los Angeles, with over 1,000 participants. The groups won the early support of the Denver-based Crusade for Justice, led by Rodolfo Gonzales, also known as Corky Gonzales. A conference of anti-war and anti-draft Chicano and Latino activists from communities in the Southwest and the city of Chicago was held at the Crusade headquarters in early December 1969. They began developing plans for nationwide mobilizations to be presented to a national Chicano Youth Liberation Conference planned for late March 1970. On February 28, 1970, a second Chicano Moratorium demonstration was held again in East Los Angeles, with more than 3,000 demonstrators from throughout California participating, despite a driving rain. Las Adelitas de Aztlán, led by Gloria Arellanes, marched in the February march, which NCMC organizer Rosalío Muñoz sees as the first time a Chicana organization participated in its own right in a Chicano demonstration. A Chicano program on the local public television station produced a documentary of that march, used nationally by the committee to popularize its efforts. At the March Chicano Youth Conference, held in Denver, Rosalío Muñoz, the co-chair for the Los Angeles Chicano Moratorium, moved to hold a National Chicano Moratorium against the war on August 29, 1970. Local moratoriums were planned for cities throughout the Southwest and beyond, to build up for the national event on August 29.

More than 20 local protests were held in cities such as Houston, Albuquerque, Chicago, Denver, Fresno, San Francisco, San Diego, Oakland, Oxnard, San Fernando, San Pedro Coachella Valley, and Douglas, Arizona. Most had 1,000 or more participants.

== March in Los Angeles ==
The NCMC's largest march took place on August 29, 1970, at Laguna Park (now Ruben F. Salazar Park). Between 20,000 and 30,000 participants, drawn from around the nation, marched down Whittier Boulevard in East Los Angeles. The rally was broken up by local police, who said that they had gotten reports that a nearby liquor store was being robbed. They chased the "suspects" into the park, and declared the gathering of thousands to be an illegal assembly.

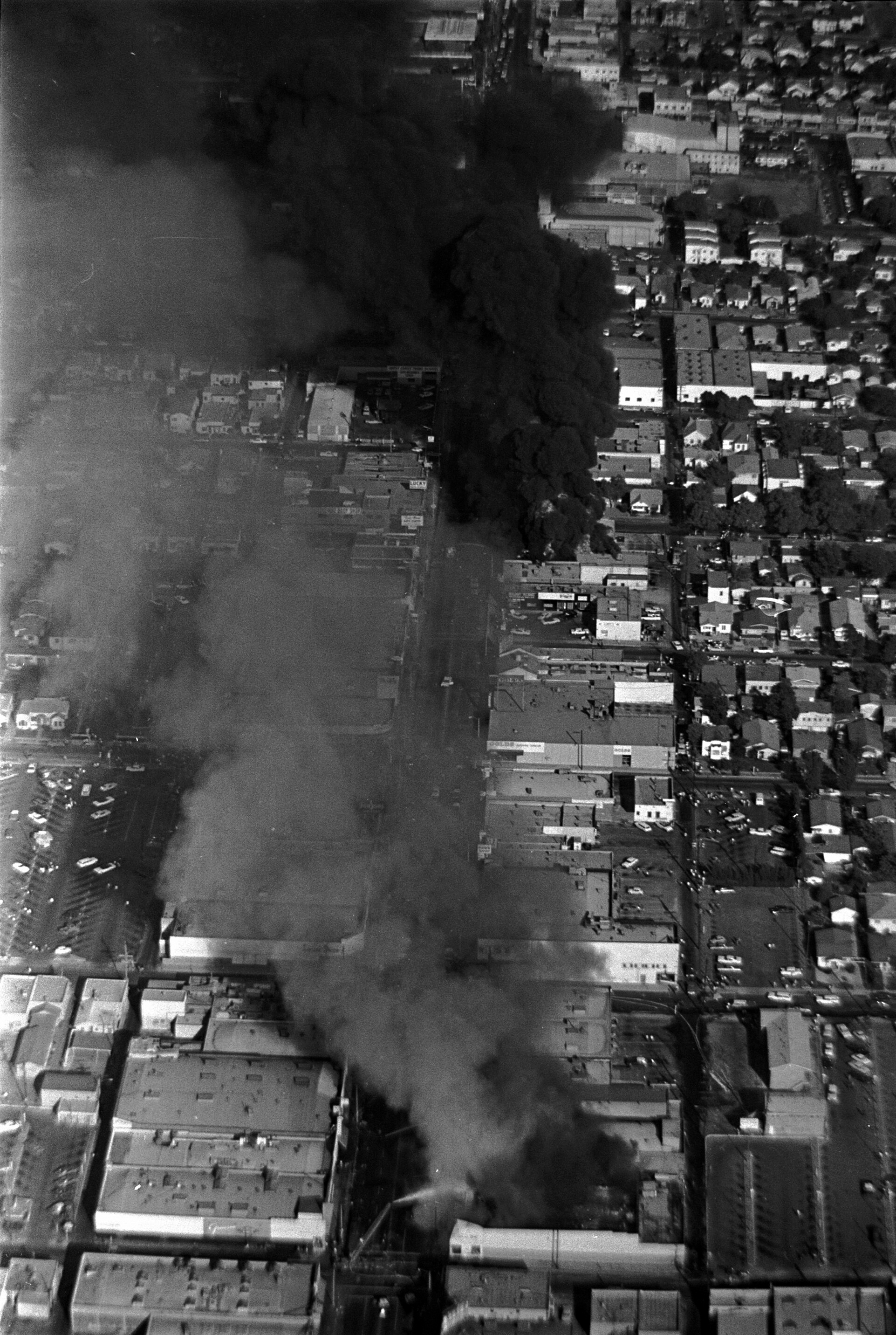
Aerial view of the August riots

Monitors and activists resisted the attack, but eventually people were herded back to the march route of Whittier Boulevard. As protest organizer Rosalinda Montez Palacios recounts,

"I was sitting on the lawn directly in front of the stage resting after a long and peaceful march when out of nowhere appeared a helicopter overhead and started dropping canisters of tear gas on the marchers as we were enjoying the program. We began to run for safety and as we breathed in the teargas, were blinded by it. Some of us made it to nearby homes where people started flushing their faces with water from garden hoses. Our eyes were burning and tearing and we choked as we tried to breath [sic?]. The peaceful marchers could not believe what was happening and once we controlled the burning from our eyes, many decided to fight back."

Noriega, however, did not remember seeing helicopters at the August 29 event when interviewed in his 80s. Many other reliable accounts mention helicopters. One author in Texas thinks there might be confusion with other demonstrations, at which helicopters were used.

The LA protests also featured around one hundred members and affiliates from Denver, Colorado who wanted to take part in a larger protest. Though the bus was stopped by San Bernardino police, the group dodged further confrontation and continued to the protest by telling them they were headed to the beach. Many of their delegation were subject to police violence during the protest and the number of arrests made this protest the largest LAPD group arrest during a riot. In addition, this was cited as the "largest urban uprising in California by people of color since the Watts uprising of 1965".

Stores went up in smoke, scores were injured, and more than 150 were arrested. Three people were killed: Lyn Ward (a Brown Beret medic), Angel Gilberto Díaz (a Brown Beret from Pico Rivera Ca.), and Rubén Salazar, an award-winning journalist, news director of the local Spanish-language television station, and columnist for the Los Angeles Times. As the Chicano poet Alurista put it: "The police called it a people's riot; the people called it a police riot."

Accounts of the deaths differ. According to police, Díaz ran a barricade in his car, which caused police to shoot him, and he subsequently crashed into a telephone pole. Journalist and professor Raúl Ruiz says Díaz was sitting in the passenger seat when he was shot in the back of the head.

Police attribute Ward's death to a bomb planted by protesters. Witnesses thought it was caused by an exploding gas canister. Noting the multiple contusions on Ward's head, Ruiz suspects a police beating as the cause of death.

The Moratorium became notable for the death of Ruben Salazar, a prominent investigative reporter known for his writings on civil rights and police brutality. Deputy Thomas Wilson of the Los Angeles County Sheriff's Department fired a tear gas canister into the Silver Dollar Café at the conclusion of the August 29 rally, killing Salazar. Wilson was never punished for his actions. Many regarded the killing of Salazar as an assassination, since Salazar was the most prominent Chicano voice. Moreover, he was actively investigating police malfeasance and he very actively called for police accountability. Salazar also told close confidants prior to his death that he had a suspicion of being followed by the police. The Sheriff's Department files claim Wilson's action was accidental, and this conclusion was reaffirmed by authorities. But many questions remain about his actions that caused the death of Salazar.

Gustav Montag Jr., a 24-year-old native of Sternowitz, Austria, is sometimes listed as a fatality on August 29, one who allegedly died fighting police. But he was killed at the final moratorium demonstration, when nineteen others were wounded. Montag, according to his sister-in-law, went to the January 31 demonstration hoping to witness a riot, where a ricocheted buckshot pellet fired by police stuck him in the heart and killed him.

The continuous clashes with the police made mass mobilizations problematic, but the commitment to social change lasted. Many community leaders, politicians, clergy, businessmen, judges, teachers, and trade unionists participated in the many Chicano Moratoria.

There is evidence that the National Chicano Moratorium Committee was infiltrated by an agent from The Bureau of Alcohol Tobacco and Firearms (ATF), which led to the ousting of leader Rosalio Muñoz. Eustancio Martinez revealed in a Los Angeles Press Club press release that he had worked as a police informer among Chicano activists for two years. Martinez told the press that he had been an informer and agent provocateur for the ATF under instructions from his supervisors so they would be able to make arrests and raid NCMC headquarters.

== La Marcha de la Reconquista ==
In 1971, the Moratorium Committee underwent a shift in their organizational focus from protesting the Vietnam War and police brutality against Chicanos to building support for La Raza Unida Party. This shift in support of RUP came after then California Governor Reagan's "right-wing attacks on minorities and working people". The Moratorium Committee, along with activist groups from the Coachella and Imperial Valleys as well as members from the East L.A. Brown Berets, began organizing a march that would span over 800 miles from the U.S.-Mexico border to Sacramento. The march primarily focused on gathering support from rural communities which had a high population of Mexican farmworkers. Not only would this march serve as a protest against Reagan and his discriminatory views against Chicanos, but also to garner support for La Raza Unida Party to be on the ballot. The five main issues the march would address were: the Raza Unida Party on the ballot, welfare, education, police, and the war.

La Marcha de la Reconquista officially began on May 5, 1971, Cinco de Mayo, on the U.S.-Mexico border and was set to go until August of that same year. The march attracted various activist groups from around California including "Coachella-Indio area activists, MEChA students, members from La Raza Unida." Rallies were held in areas with larger populations, with the first big rally taking place in Coachella where about 1,000 people attended. Student activist, María Elena Gaitán, was a featured speaker at this rally and throughout the march, rousing audiences with impassioned speeches in English and Spanish. Due to police tensions with the LAPD and the history of police brutality at rallies held by the Chicano Moratorium, the march organizers decided to skip a rally in L.A. and instead hold one in San Gabriel.

Tensions arose between the Chicano Moratorium and members of the East L.A. Brown Berets. As Rosalio Muñoz (Founder of the National Chicano Moratorium Committee) recalls, "there were constant fights along the way, even before we got to Oxnard. Rivalries with gangs along the way or fights over girls or drugs only added to the tension." Despite these bumps on the way, the rally concluded in August 1971 at the state capitol with the biggest rally of the march. The end of the three-month Marcha de la Reconquista also marked the end of The National Chicano Moratorium Committee. Muñoz reflects back on the history of the committee as "being shaky but in one form or another it had survived. La Marcha represented a last effort to resuscitate the coalition."

== Legacy ==
Celebratory events commemorating the initial Moratoriums started in 1986 and have been transpiring every year since beginning with the Chicano Moratorium Barrio Unity Conference in San Diego. Every year, the original events have been commemorated and emulated by the National Chicano Moratorium Committee (NCMC). The Committee addressed the American war in Afghanistan. The theme of the 2013 NCMC commemoration was "Education for Liberation, Not Assimilation". Along with this theme NCMC commemorated the life of Sal Castro who died earlier that year after his distinguished career in education, most notably supporting the East Los Angeles high school walkouts. An October 11, 1968 Los Angeles Freep article was headlined "Education, Not Eradication", began "Sal Castro won his teaching job back at Lincoln High School because the new militant Mexican American movement here demanded it and fought for it….”

The August 29, 1970 march was filmed for a documentary named Requiem-29, which captured the Chicano Moratorium and its aftermath, and released right after the event concluded. The short documentary was made as a part of UCLA's Ethno-Communications Program and was directed and produced by UCLA students David García and Moctesuma Esparza. A full restoration of Requiem-29 was done by the UCLA Film and Television Archive and premiered in 2024.

In 2021, Requiem-29 was selected for preservation in the United States National Film Registry by the Library of Congress as being "culturally, historically, or aesthetically significant".

== See also ==
- Lists of protests against the Vietnam War § 1970
