= Ruben Salazar =

Mexican-American civil rights activist and journalist; killed by riot police in 1970

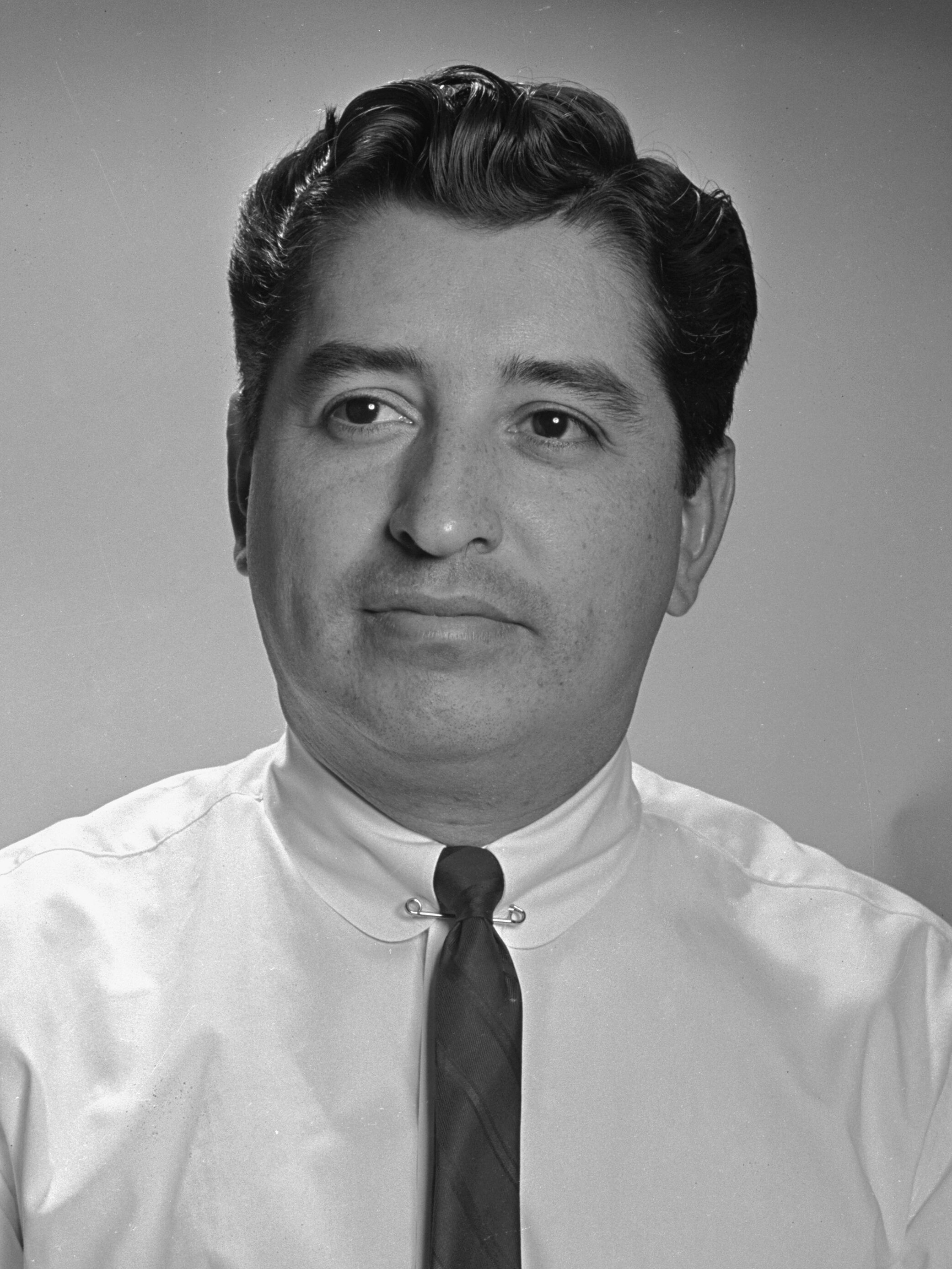
- Salazar in 1970
- Born: March 3, 1928; Ciudad Juárez, Mexico
- Died: August 29, 1970 (aged 42); Los Angeles, California, U.S.
- Occupations: Journalist and civil rights activist
- Years active: 1956–1970

Ruben Salazar (March 3, 1928 – August 29, 1970) was a civil rights activist and a reporter for the Los Angeles Times. He was the first Mexican journalist from mainstream media to cover the Chicano community.

Salazar was killed during the National Chicano Moratorium March against the Vietnam War on August 29, 1970, in East Los Angeles, California. During the march, Los Angeles County Sheriff's deputy Thomas Wilson struck and immediately killed Salazar with a tear-gas projectile. No criminal charge was filed, but Salazar's family reached an out-of-court financial settlement with the county.

== Early life ==
Born in Ciudad Juárez, Mexico, March 3, 1928, Salazar was brought to the United States by his family in 1929 and grew up in El Paso, Texas. Salazar began his U.S. naturalization process on October 15, 1947, when he submitted his application for a certificate of arrival and preliminary form for a declaration of intention of citizenship.

== Career ==
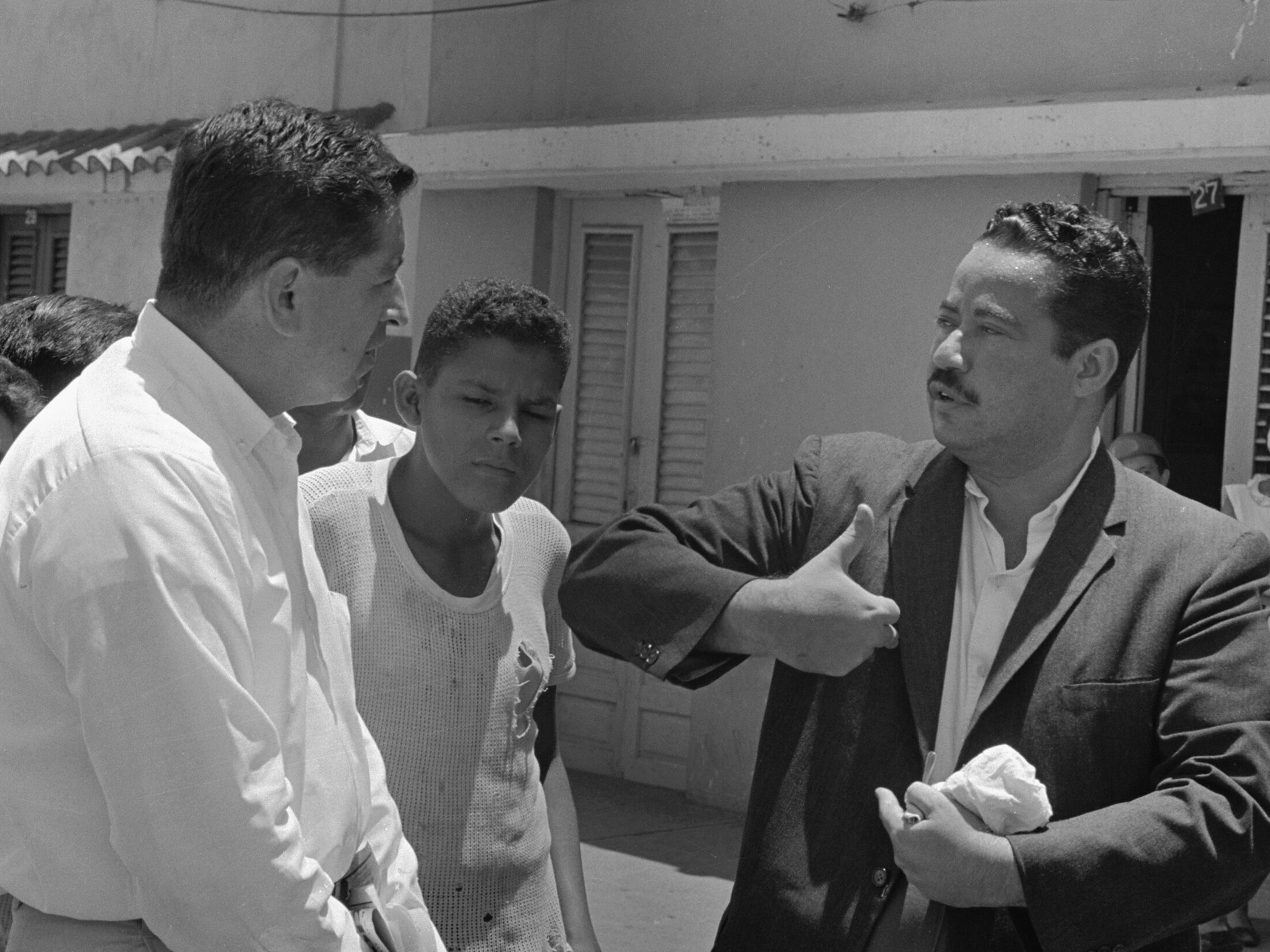
Salazar interviewing civilians in Vietnam, 1965.

After high school, he served in the U.S. Army for two years. Salazar attended Texas Western College, graduating in 1954 with a degree in journalism. He obtained a job as an investigative journalist at the now-defunct El Paso Herald-Post; at one point he posed as a vagrant to get arrested while he investigated the poor treatment of prisoners in the El Paso jail. After his tenure at the Herald-Post, Salazar worked at several California newspapers, including the Santa Rosa Press Democrat. Moving south from Santa Ana, California to be a part of the San Francisco News in 1956 to 1957 as a reporter.

Salazar was a news reporter and columnist for the Los Angeles Times from 1959 to 1970. During his career, Salazar became one of the most prominent figures within the Chicano movement. He was a foreign correspondent in his early years at the Times, covering the 1965 United States occupation of the Dominican Republic, the Vietnam War, and the Tlatelolco massacre (the latter while serving as the Times' bureau chief in Mexico City).

When Salazar returned to the US in 1968, he focused on the Mexican-American community and the Chicano movement, writing about East Los Angeles, an area largely ignored by the media except for coverage of crimes. He became the first Chicano journalist to cover the ethnic group while working in a large general circulation publication. Many of his pieces were critical of the Los Angeles government's treatment of Chicanos, particularly after he came into conflict with police during the East L.A. walkouts. While reporting for the Times, Salazar forged relationships with members of the Chicano movement, including draft protester Rosalio Muñoz.

In January 1970, Salazar left the Times to become news director for the Spanish language television station KMEX in Los Angeles. At KMEX, he investigated allegations of police officers' planting evidence to implicate Chicanos and the July 1970 police shooting of two unarmed Mexican nationals. According to Salazar, he was visited by undercover LAPD detectives who warned him that his investigations were "dangerous in the minds of barrio people."

During Salazar's time as the news director for KMEX, which is a Spanish-language station since 1962, he became more outspoken on Chicano issues and gave priority to cases that were important to the Chicano Movement. This included the killing of the Sánchez cousins by police which brought forth a community-wide protest as well as covering the Chicano Moratorium which ultimately led to his death.

=== Support for Chicano movement ===
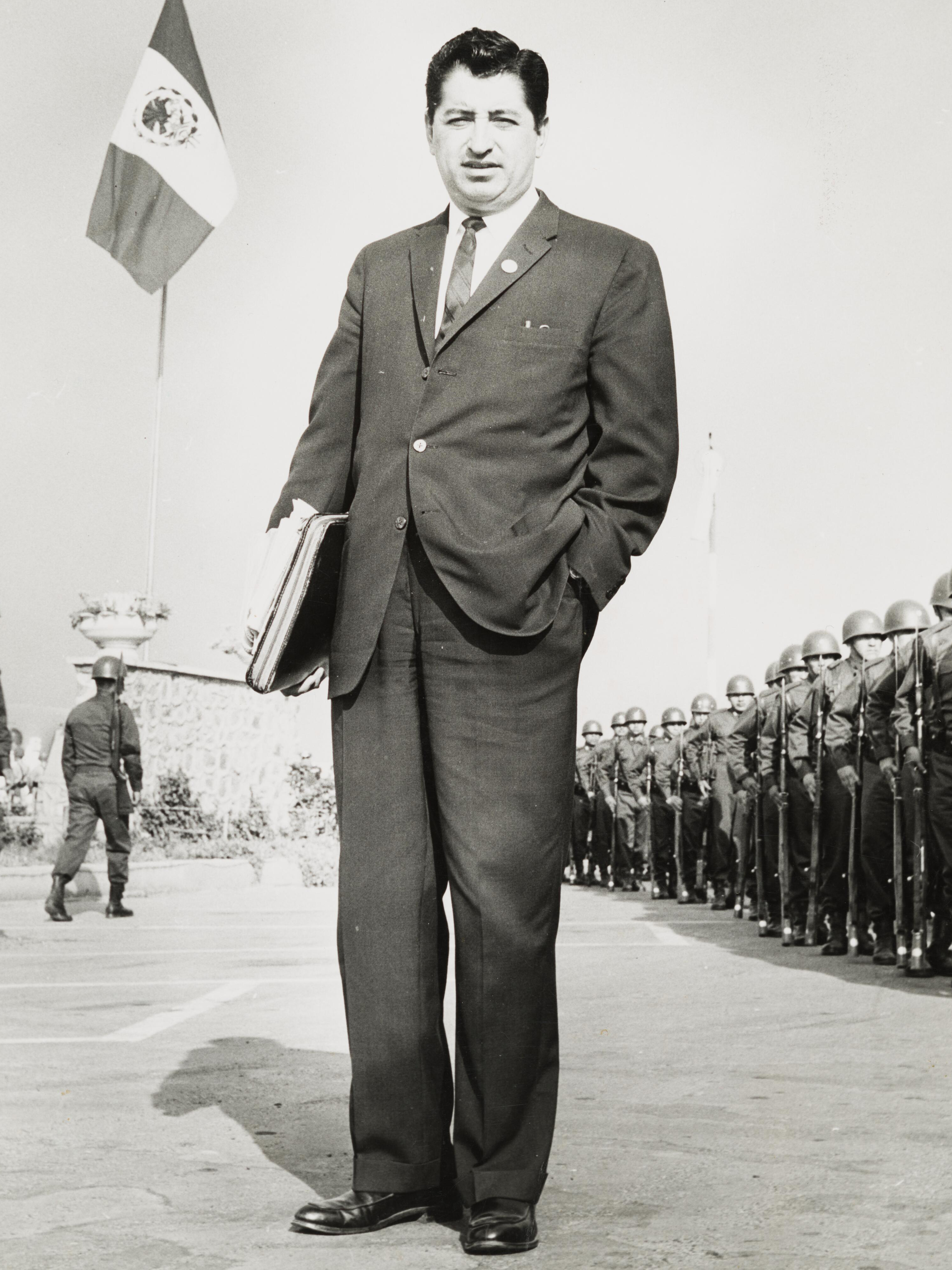
Salazar in Mexico City, 1966.

Salazar's strong support for the Chicano movement as a Mexican-American distinguished him early on from other journalists in mainstream media. With a strong disparity of racial minorities in news organizations nationwide, Salazar felt it was his personal and professional responsibility to give necessary attention to the actions led by his fellow Chicanos in East Los Angeles. In February 1970, just six months prior to his death, Salazar made his support for the Chicano movement particularly clear when he authored an article in the Los Angeles Times, titled, "Who Is A Chicano? And What Is It the Chicanos Want?" In this piece, Salazar not only describes the evolving identity of Chicanos and the historic importance of the movement, but he details his frustration with the lack of Mexican-American representation among the elected representatives in the Los Angeles city council. Salazar writes, "Mexican-Americans, though large in numbers, are so politically impotent that in Los Angeles, where the country's largest single concentration of Spanish-speaking live, they have no one of their own on the City Council. This in a city politically sophisticated enough to have three Negro council-men."

Due to his support of the Chicano movement, Salazar became an FBI target and was the subject of an FBI internal file. He was noted as being cooperative during his interactions with the FBI during the investigation of Stokely Carmichael, but he had drawn the FBI's attention during the Korean War when he began corresponding with a white female pacifist regarding the loss of his application for US citizenship by the army. During his Carmichael interview, he is noted as saying that he could not be a witness to the speech that FBI was referencing as he was not present to which he was then asked to obtain a video of the speech to present to the FBI. While Salazar accepted, he did so under the notion that he would publicize the fact that the FBI was looking for the tape. As they feared the civil unrest this could cause if publicized, the FBI rescinded their request. Due to the fact that the FBI and the LAPD correlated civil unrest with communism, and Salazar reported at many events where civil unrest occurred, he was viewed in his files as a communist. LAPD also held files on Salazar specifically due to an article that Salazar wrote about the Chief of Police, Chief Davis, wherein he reported the fact that Davis referred to Mexican "tyranny and dictatorship". While local and national law enforcement were displeased with Salazar's reporting, he continued to write articles advocating the rights of the Chicano community.

== Death ==
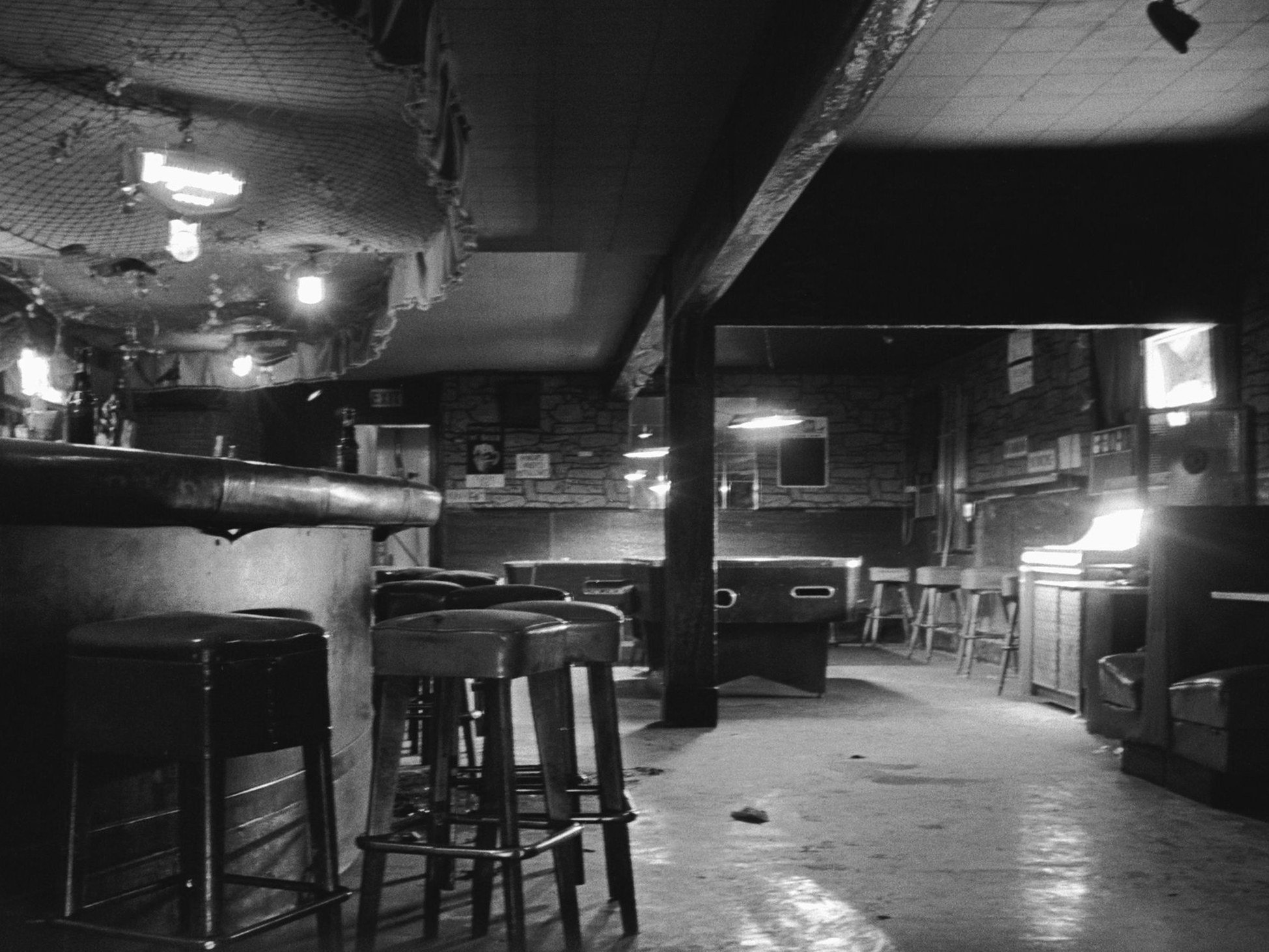
The Silver Dollar Bar, where Salazar was killed, in 1970.

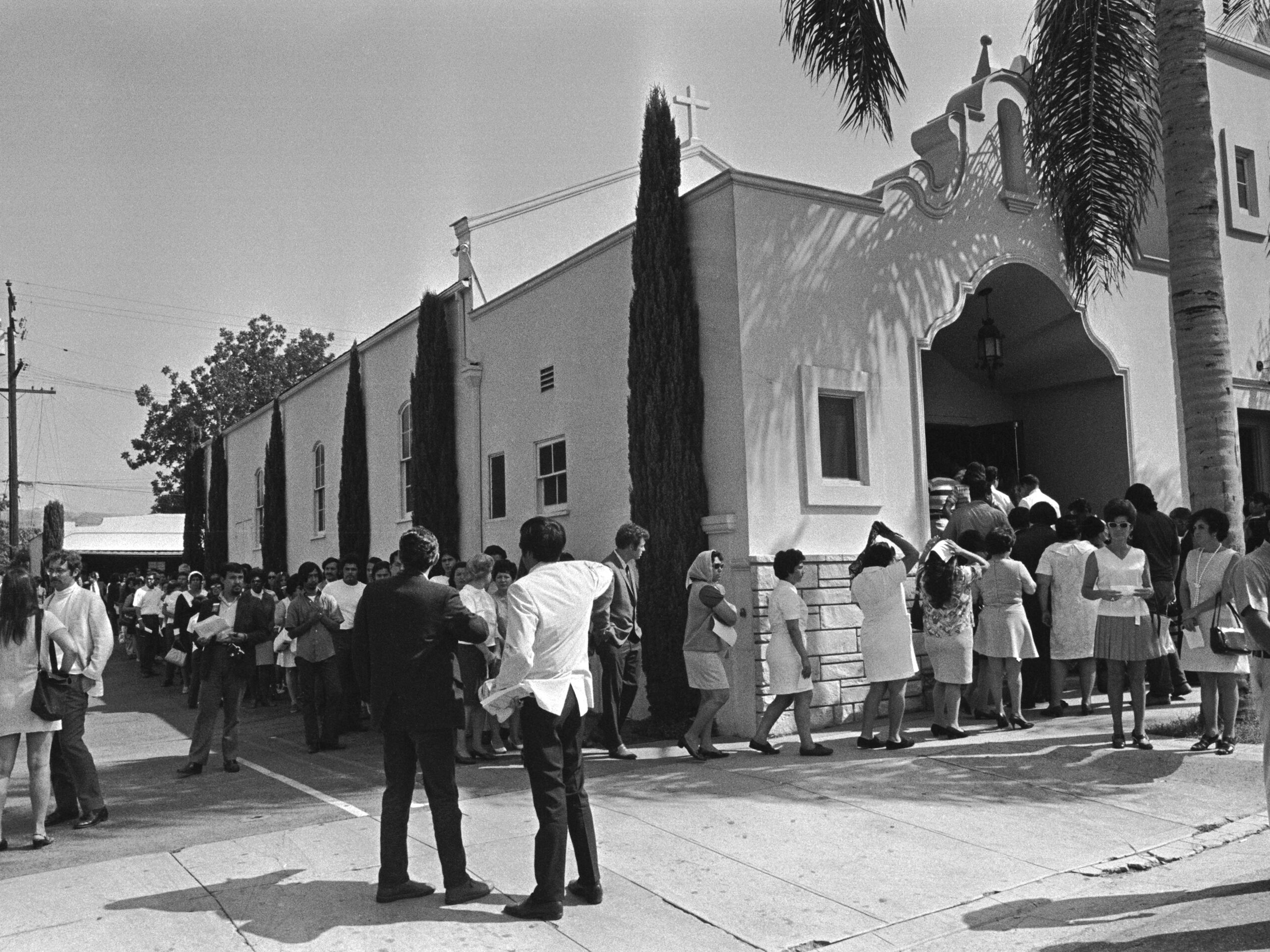
Mourners pay respects to Salazar, 1970.

On August 29, 1970, Salazar was covering the National Chicano Moratorium March, organized to protest the Vietnam War, in which some believed that a disproportionate number of Latinos served and were killed. The march ended with a rally that was broken up by the Los Angeles County Sheriff's Department using tear gas. Panic and rioting ensued. Salazar had taken a break from covering the march and was resting in a nearby bar when a tear gas round fired by police through a curtained doorway struck him in the head, killing him. A coroner's inquest ruled the shooting of the tear gas projectile to be "death at the hands of another," but Tom Wilson, the sheriff's deputy who fired the shot that killed Salazar, was never prosecuted. At the time, many believed the homicide was a premeditated assassination of a prominent, vocal member of the Los Angeles Chicano community.

The riot started when the owners of the Green Mill liquor store, located around the corner from the Silver Dollar Bar on Whittier Boulevard, called in a complaint about people stealing from them. Deputies responded and a fight broke out. Later on that day, cadets from the nearby Sheriff's Academy were bussed to the area and marched into the park. A fight ensued, with the untrained cadets being beaten up. This led to more rioting. The Green Mill liquor store is still located at the same place on Whittier Boulevard. The owners later denied contacting the Sheriff's Department.

Salazar was resting in the Silver Dollar Bar after the protest became violent. According to a witness, "Ruben Salazar had just sat down to sip a quiet beer at the bar, away from the madness in the street," when a deputy fired a tear gas projectile through a curtain hanging at the entrance of the bar, hitting Salazar in the head and killing him instantly. Deputy Wilson fired a 10-inch wall-piercing type of tear gas round from a tear gas gun of the type intended for barricade situations, rather than rolling in a tear gas canister, which produces a much larger cloud of gas and is generally used to disperse crowds.

The story of Salazar's killing was the subject of "Strange Rumblings in Aztlan," a 1971 article by gonzo journalist Hunter S. Thompson for Rolling Stone magazine. On February 22, 2011, the Office of Independent Review released a report of its examination of the Los Angeles Sheriff's Department records on the death of Salazar. After reviewing thousands of documents, the civilian watchdog agency concluded there is no evidence that sheriff's deputies intentionally targeted Salazar or had him under surveillance.

Deputy Wilson, after being identified as responsible for Salazar's death, stated that "he did not know, and under the circumstances was not concerned about, what kind of tear gas projectile he fired". Salazar's death captured the attention of many activists within the Chicano movement as his death occurred at the hands of those whom the movement believed were responsible for the marginalization of Chicano communities. At meetings with the District Attorney about Salazar's death, many Chicanos complained about police brutality. After several days of testimony, a coroner's jury returned with a split verdict, and no charges were filed by the District Attorney. Nevertheless, three years after Salazar's death, Los Angeles County reached a settlement of $700,000 with Salazar's family as a result of the sheriff's department not using "proper and lawful guidelines for the use of deadly force" during the march. At the time, this was the highest settlement recorded in Los Angeles county history.

He was survived by his wife, Sally (née Robare), and their daughters, Lisa Salazar Johnson and Stephanie Salazar Cook, and son, John Salazar.

== Legacy and honors ==
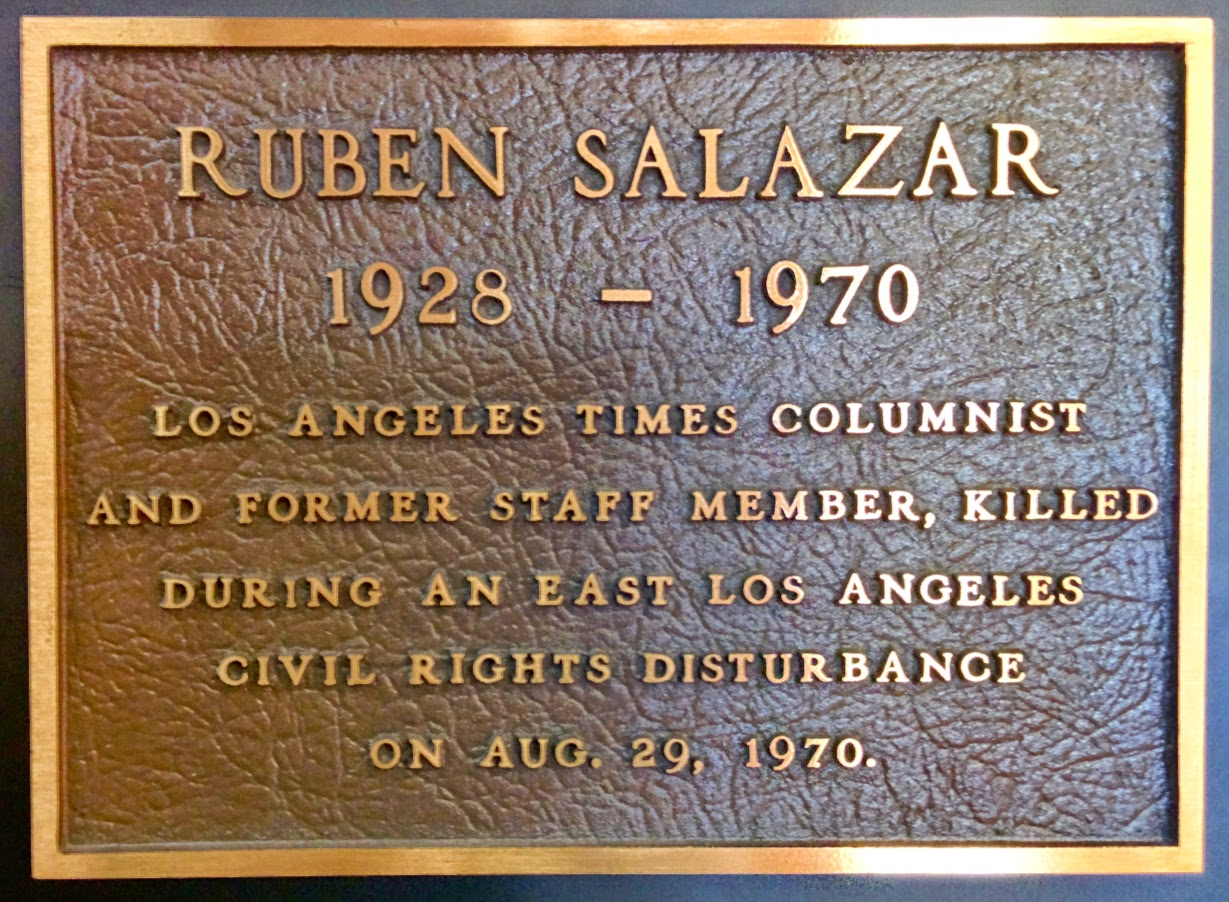
A plaque honoring Salazar was mounted in the Globe lobby of the former Los Angeles Times building in downtown Los Angeles.

- Salazar was a two-time winner of the Greater Los Angeles Press Club Award and in 1965 was presented with an award from the Equal Opportunity Foundation.
- In 1971, Salazar was posthumously awarded a special Robert F. Kennedy Journalism Award.
- After the controversy related to his death had subsided, Laguna Park, site of the 1970 rally and subsequent police action, was renamed Salazar Park in his honor.
- Salazar is depicted under the name "Roland Zanzibar" in Oscar Zeta Acosta's 1973 novel The Revolt of the Cockroach People.
- In 1979, Sonoma State University renamed its library in honor of Salazar. Subsequently, in 2002 the library moved into a new building, and the former library building was renamed Salazar Hall.
- In 1996, the Smithsonian American Art Museum in Washington, D.C., acquired the painting Death of Rubén Salazar, a 1986 oil on canvas by artist Frank Romero.
- His death was commemorated in a corrido by Lalo Guerrero titled "El 29 de Agosto".
- A classroom building at California State University, Los Angeles (Cal State LA) was named for him in 1976. On October 12, 2006, Salazar Hall was rededicated with the unveiling of his portrait by John Martin.
- On October 5, 2007, the United States Postal Service announced that it would honor five journalists of the 20th century with first-class rate postage stamps, to be issued on Tuesday, April 22, 2008: Martha Gellhorn, John Hersey, George Polk, Ruben Salazar, and Eric Sevareid.
- A documentary about Salazar by Phillip Rodriguez titled Ruben Salazar: Man in the Middle was broadcast on PBS television on April 29, 2014.

== See also ==
- History of the Mexican Americans in Los Angeles
- List of journalists killed in the United States
