= El Camino College =

Community college in Alondra Park, California, US

- Type: Public community college
- Established: 1947; 79 years ago
- President: Brenda Thames
- Students: 22,654
- Location: Alondra Park and Torrance, U.S. 33.885881°N 118.330457°W
- Campus: Urban, 26 acres (11 ha)
- Student newspaper: The Union
- Colors: Blue & gray
- Nickname: Warriors
- Website: www.elcamino.edu

El Camino College (Elco or ECC) is a public community college in Los Angeles County, California. Most of it is in Alondra Park, while a section is in the city limits of Torrance. It consists of 37 buildings spanning an area of roughly 26 acres (11 ha). It is one of two community colleges serving Southern California's South Bay area.

The El Camino Community College District was officially established on July 1, 1947. As of 2019, the college served approximately 23,000 students within the El Camino Community College District, including the communities of Alondra Park, Carson, Del Aire, El Segundo, Hawthorne, Hermosa Beach, Inglewood, Ladera Heights, Lawndale, Lennox, Lomita, Manhattan Beach, Redondo Beach, Torrance, View Park–Windsor Hills. El Camino College offers 2,500 classes in 85 programs, including vocational, undergraduate, and honors courses, many available in online and televised formats for distance education.

== Student demographics ==
Fall Demographics of student body
Ethnic Breakdown	2018	2017
Hispanic and Latino American	53%	53%
Black	13%	14%
Asian American	13%	15%
White	13%	13%
Multiracial Americans	5%	4%
International students	2%	Nil
Unknown	Nil	1%
Female	51%	52%
Male	49%	48%

Total Students: 24,349

Age	Total	Percentage
17 or younger	1,289	5%
18 to 19	6,293	27%
20 to 24	9,452	40%
25 to 29	3,193	13%
30 to 39	2,131	8%
40 to 49	850	3%
50 or older	840	4%

Enrollment Level	Total	Percentage
Full-Time	7,632	31%
Part-Time	16,715	69%

== Campus media ==
=== KECC radio station ===
The college hosts one radio station, KECC. The first time KECC was actually on the air experimentally was Career Day, April 27, 1994. The operation lasted only four hours, from 9 am to 1 pm. On November 11, 1994, KECC signed on the air for the first time as a regularly scheduled carrier current broadcast station. At that time, the frequency used was 1620 kHz. In the fall of 2000 KECC changed frequency from 1200 kHz to 1500 kHz.

== Athletics ==
Built in 1958, Murdock Stadium hosts some of the schools athletic programs.

Men's sports	Women's sports
Baseball	Badminton
Basketball	Basketball
Cross Country	Beach volleyball
Football	Cross country
Golf	Soccer
Soccer	Softball
Swimming and diving	Swimming and diving
Tennis	Tennis
Track and field	Track and field
Volleyball	Volleyball
Water polo	Water polo

== In media ==
The college campus has been used as a filming location since at least the 1970s. Visitors to the IBM pavilion at the 1964-65 World's Fair in New York City saw an Eames film that featured El Camino coach Kenneth Swearingen and the school football team. Among other films shot in part at the college are:

- All American
- Cheaper by the Dozen (2003 remake)
- Crime After Crime
- The Circle
- The Dark Knight Rises
- The Longest Yard (2005 remake)
- Visiting... with Huell Howser Episode 513

== Performing arts ==
El Camino College has a 2,000-seat auditorium, a 350-seat campus theatre, and the 190-seat Robert Hagg Recital Hall. The Marsee Auditorium is the venue for the South Bay Ballet's annual production of The Nutcracker, and is known for showcasing dance and opera companies, traveling artists, and other Broadway, film and television veterans, such as Shirley Jones and Gregory Hines. The Marsee Auditorium as well as the other on-campus venues also host El Camino College resident performers.

== Schauerman Library ==
The Schauerman Library serves as the research center of the college. The library houses the El Camino College archives.

== Notable alumni ==
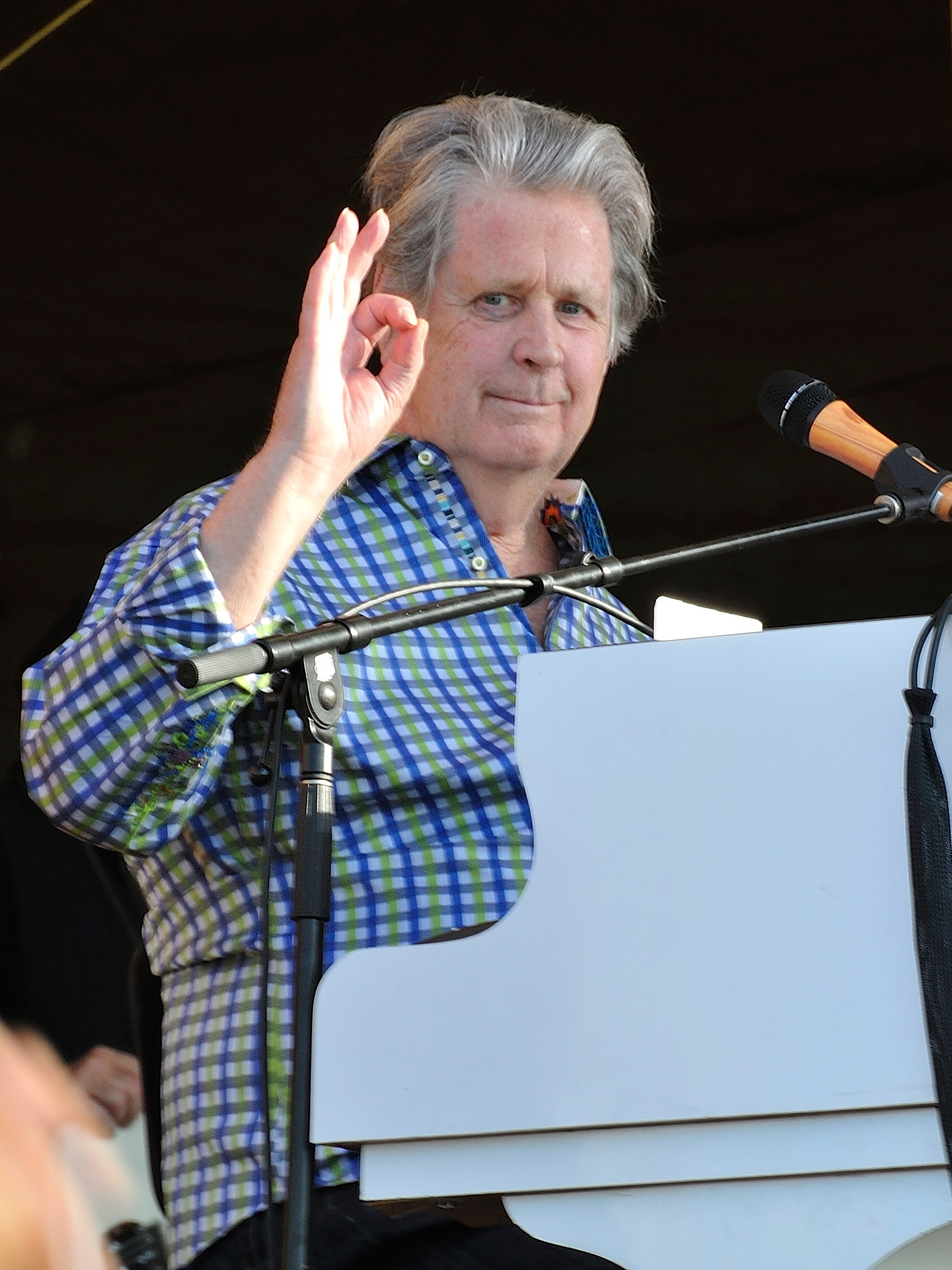
Brian Wilson, American musician

Some of the college's notable alumni include Alan Jardine and Brian Wilson of The Beach Boys, and Suge Knight, who is the CEO and founder of Death Row Records.

== Notable faculty ==
- John DeMita, theater professor
- Fitzhugh Dodson, psychology professor
- George Gerbner, communications professor
- Kim Krizan, writer and actor
- George Stanich, coach, the George Stanich Gymnasium is named in his honor
- Julius Sumner Miller, physics professor
- Al Muratsuchi, political science professor
- April Ross, beach volleyball coach
- Ambrose Schindler, American football coach

== See also ==
- Compton College
