= Lawndale Elementary School District =

School district in California

Address
- 4161 West 147th Street Lawndale, California, 90260; United States

District information
- Type: Public
- Grades: K–12
- NCES District ID: 0621210

Students and staff
- Students: 4,949 (2020–2021)
- Teachers: 202.52 (FTE)
- Staff: 338.71 (FTE)
- Student–teacher ratio: 24.44:1

Other information
- Website: www.lawndalesd.net

Lawndale Elementary School District (LESD) is a school district headquartered in Lawndale, California, United States.

The district educates residents in: Lawndale, and portions of Hawthorne, as well as unincorporated areas in Los Angeles County (including Alondra Park). It formerly covered a portion of Del Aire.

== History ==
Around the mid-20th century most of the families were Anglo White and blue collar. In 1968 the district had 7,016 students, a peak enrollment. However in 1983 it was down to 3,974, which became the lowest enrollment at the time. The enrollment declined because the area became more expensive, limiting the number of new families. In 1985 the district's enrollment had increased to 4,030 students, with 42.9% being Anglo White, 37.3% being Latino or Hispanic, 13.9% being Asians, 5.6% being black, and 0.4% being Native American.

In 1987 Larry Breon, a member of the Lawndale city council, put forward a proposal to merge this district with the Centinela Valley Union High School District, with the former Lawndale High School being the unified school district's high school. Due to potential complexities, a lawyer from the Centinela district criticized the plan.

James Waters served as the superintendent until 1991, when he moved to be the Santee School District superintendent. His resignation was effective after September 20, 1991.

Around 1991 the annual growth rate for the student body was 100 as wealthier families were moving to the district. In 1991 Kim Kowsky of the Los Angeles Times stated that the district, in light of the expansion of the number of racial and ethnic minority students, was "rapidly changing" and that therefore there were "lively" board campaigns for three seats on the district board. As of October 1991, there were 4,332 students: 41% of the students were Latino or Hispanic, 31% were Anglo White, 13% were black, and 10% were Asian. Of the student body, limited English proficiency students made up less than 30%. The enrollment circa August 1991 was about 4,500.

In 2021 a block of unincorporated areas that was in the Lawndale School District and Centinela Valley USD voted on a proposal on whether it should move to the Wiseburn Unified School District; previously students living in the block living in Wiseburn would have had to get permission from their zoned school districts to attend Wiseburn. According to Hunter Lee the Daily Breeze, "few" people voted in the election. The vote to transfer the area to Wiseburn was approved.

== Schools ==
Elementary schools

- William Anderson Elementary School (Lawndale)
- William Green Elementary School (Lawndale)
- Billy Mitchell Elementary School (Lawndale)
  - Circa 1991 it was one of the largest LESD campuses.
- Franklin D. Roosevelt-Kit Carson Elementary School (Alondra Park, Unincorporated area)
- Lucille J. Smith Elementary School (Lawndale)
  - Majority of the student population is Latino, and low income. Around one third of the students are English language learners.
  - The elementary school was nominated for National Blue Ribbon School award for reducing the achievement gap on state standardized test scores. This is one of the highest recognition a school can earn from the federal government. It is the first school in the Lawndale elementary School District to be nominated for the award. In August, 2025, the second Trump administration terminated this award program, and no winners were announced. The elementary school hosted a local celebration anyway.
- Mark Twain Elementary School (Alondra Park, Unincorporated area)

Middle schools

- Jane Addams Middle School (Lawndale)
- Will Rogers Middle School (Lawndale)

The district had closed four schools due to the 1970s to 1980s population decline. Jonas Salk School in Hawthorne by then was not in use.
