= Hawthorne, California =

City in California, United States

- City
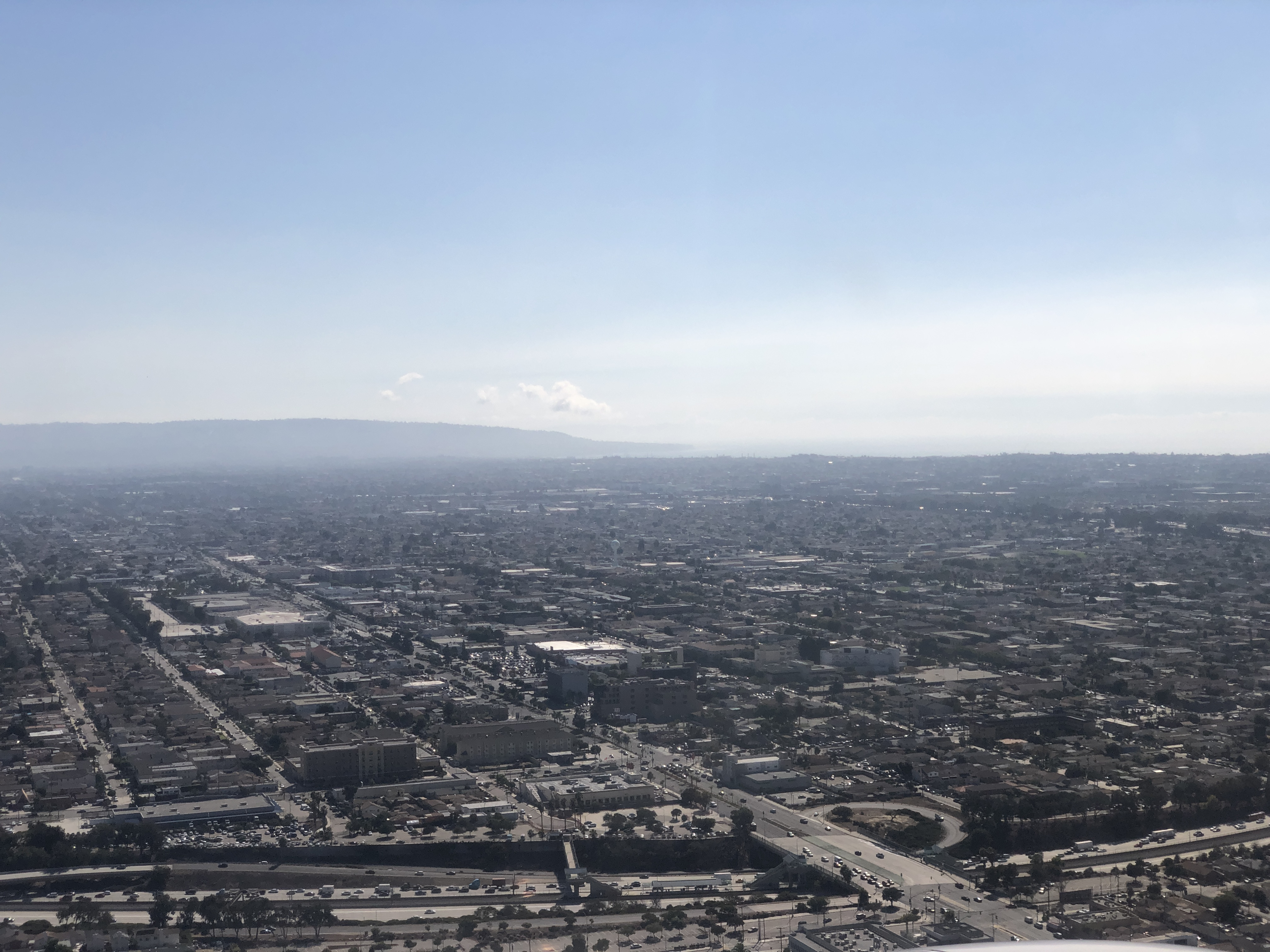
- Aerial view of Hawthorne

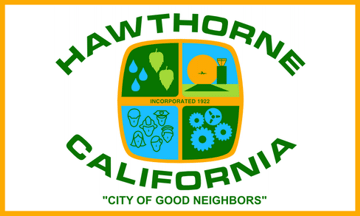
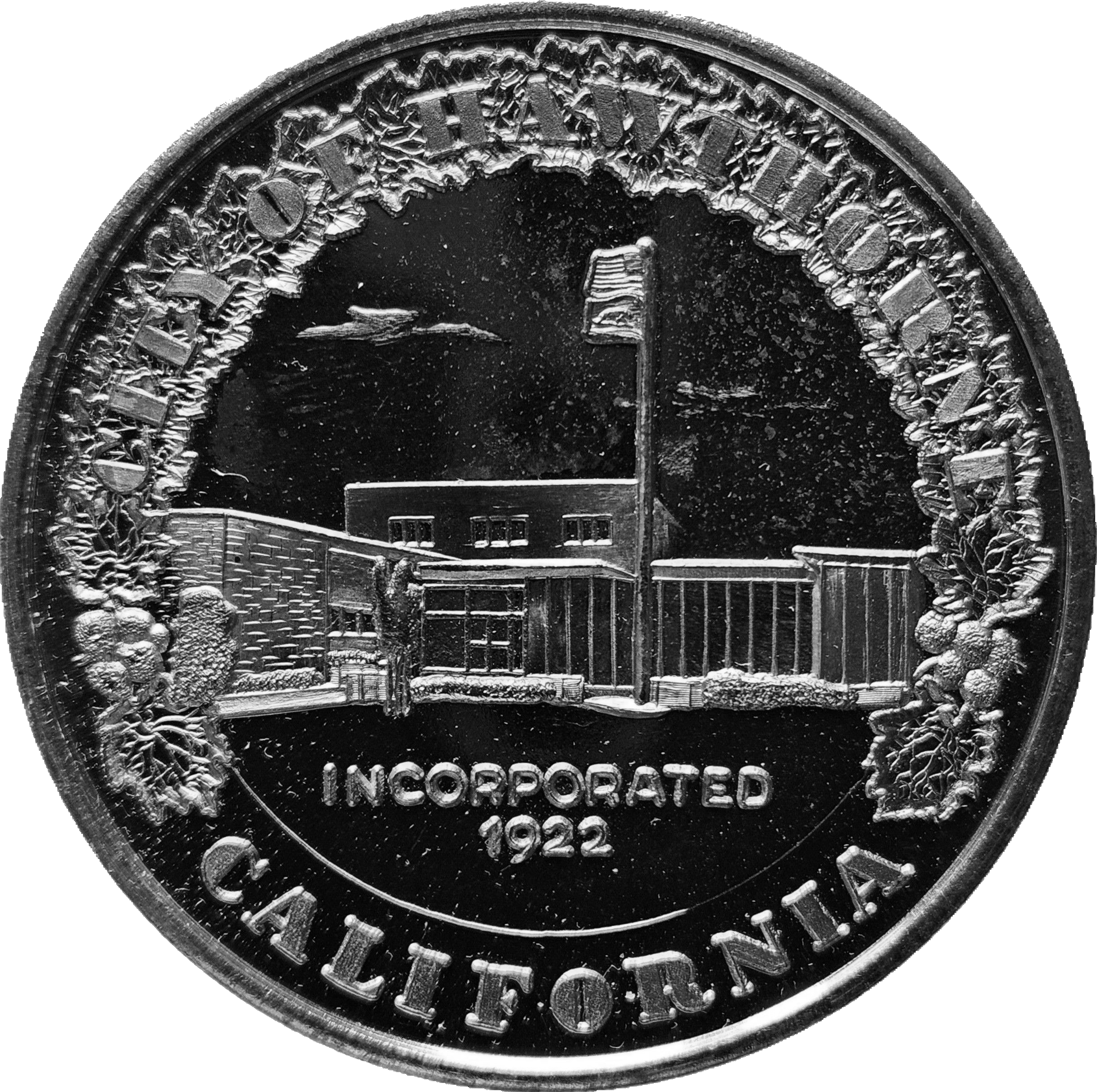
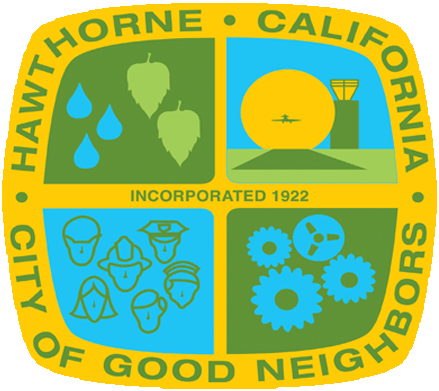
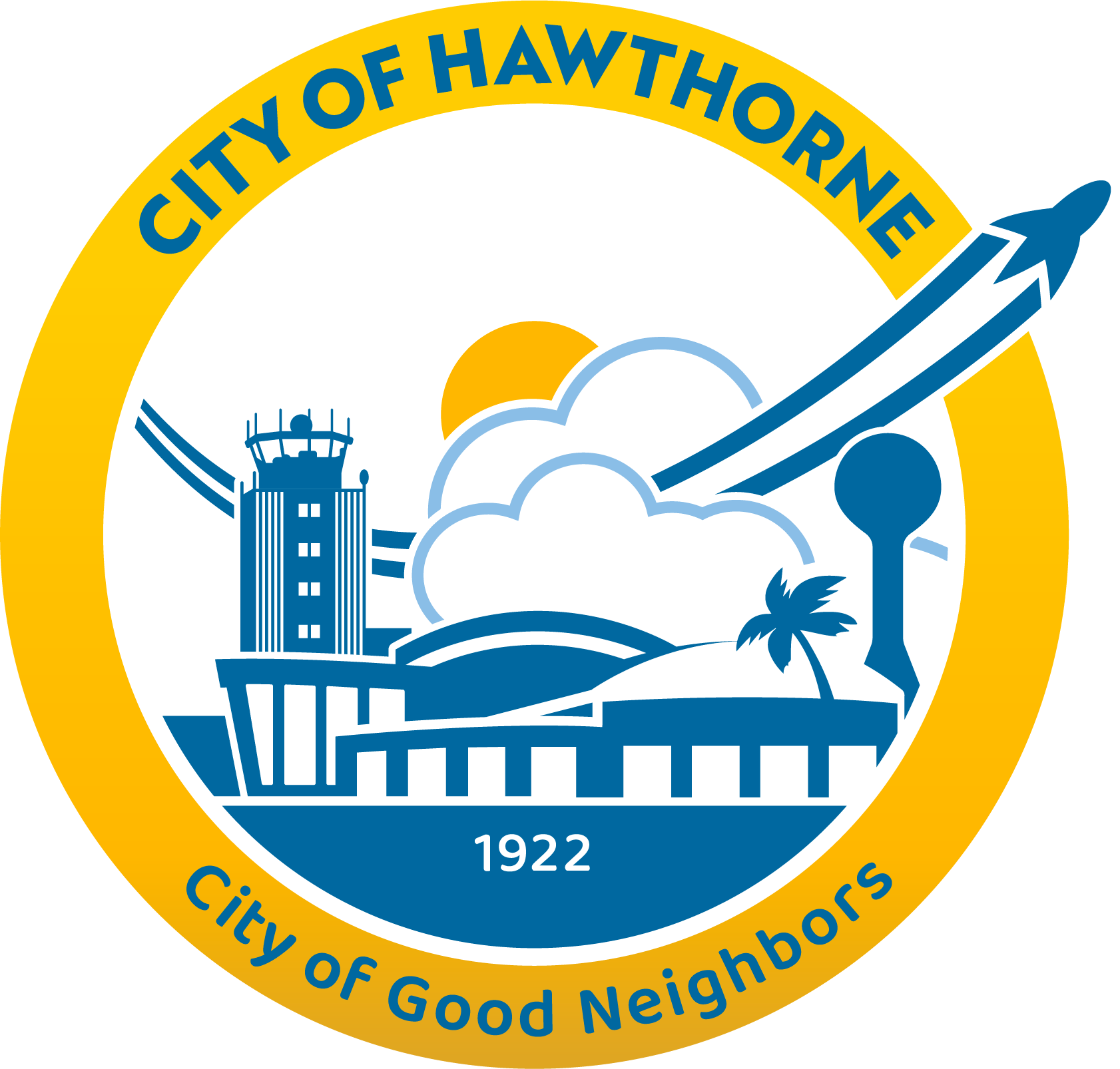
- Flag Seal Coat of arms Logo
- Motto: "City of Good Neighbors"
- Interactive map of Hawthorne, California
- Location in the United States Hawthorne (California) Hawthorne (the United States)
- Coordinates: 33°55′2″N 118°20′55″W
- Country: United States
- State: California
- County: Los Angeles
- Incorporated: July 12, 1922
- Named for: Nathaniel Hawthorne

Government
  - Type: Council-Manager
  - Mayor: Alex Vargas
  - City Manager: Vontray (Von) Norris

Area
  - Total: 6.10 sq mi (15.80 km^{2})
  - Land: 6.09 sq mi (15.77 km^{2})
  - Water: 0.012 sq mi (0.03 km^{2}) 0.18%
- Elevation: 72 ft (22 m)

Population (2020)
  - Total: 88,083
  - Rank: 99th in California
  - Density: 14,470/sq mi (5,585/km^{2})
- Time zone: UTC−8 (Pacific Time Zone)
  - Summer (DST): UTC−7 (PDT)
- ZIP Codes: 90250 and 90251
- Area codes: 310/424, 213/323
- FIPS code: 06-32548
- GNIS feature IDs: 1652717, 2410720
- Website: cityofhawthorne.org

Hawthorne is a city in southwestern Los Angeles County, California, United States. It is part of a seventeen-city subregion of the Los Angeles metropolitan area commonly known as the South Bay. As of the 2020 US census, Hawthorne had a population of 88,083.

Hawthorne is known as the home of The Beach Boys.

== History ==
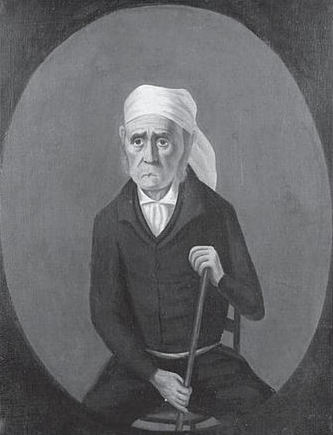
Hawthorne was originally part of Rancho Sausal Redondo, granted in 1837 to Antonio Ygnacio Ávila, of the prominent Ávila family of California.

The Tongva tribe of Native Americans first lived in the area.

Hawthorne was once part of the Rancho Sausal Redondo (Round Willow-grove Ranch) of the 22,458-acre (91 km^{2}) Mexican land grant in present-day Los Angeles County, California given in 1837 to Antonio Ygnacio Ávila by Juan Alvarado the Mexican Governments Governor of Alta California. Rancho Sausal Redondo covered the area that now includes Playa Del Rey, El Segundo, Manhattan Beach, Lawndale, Hermosa Beach, Inglewood, Hawthorne, and Redondo Beach.

Hawthorne was founded in 1905 as the "Hawthorne Improvement Company" by real estate developers B.L. Harding and H.D. Lombard. Harding's daughter shared her birthday—July 4, American Independence Day—with New England author Nathaniel Hawthorne, and a decision was made to name the small village after him.

Hawthorne was once a "whites only" settlement, commonly called a sundown town. During the 1930s, signs warned African-Americans to be out of Hawthorne by sundown.

== Geography ==
To the north of Hawthorne is the unincorporated community of Lennox and the city of Inglewood. To the east are the unincorporated community of Athens and the city of Gardena. To the south is the unincorporated community of El Camino Village, and the cities of Lawndale and Redondo Beach. Manhattan Beach is at the southwest corner of Hawthorne. To the west is the city of El Segundo, and the Los Angeles neighborhood of Westchester is to the northwest of Hawthorne. Hawthorne surrounds the unincorporated community of Del Aire on three sides. It also shares a small border on the northeast along Imperial Highway with the unincorporated community of Westmont.

The Century Freeway (Glenn Anderson Freeway, I-105) runs along the northern boundary of Hawthorne, with the C Line light rail line running down the center of the Century Freeway. The San Diego Freeway (I-405) runs along the western boundary of Hawthorne. Major east–west streets in Hawthorne include Rosecrans Avenue, El Segundo Boulevard, and Imperial Highway. Major north–south streets include Aviation Boulevard, Inglewood Avenue, Hawthorne Boulevard, Prairie Avenue, Crenshaw Boulevard, and Van Ness Avenue.

Hawthorne is five miles (8 km) from the Los Angeles International Airport.

Hawthorne comprises ZIP codes 90250 and 90251. It is in the 310 area code, except for a small portion of northeastern Hawthorne, which is located in the 323 area code.

=== Climate ===
Hawthorne, California

Climate chart (precipitation, max. and min. temperature)
J	F	M	A	M	J	J	A	S	O	N	D
3 68 46	3 68 48	2.4 69 50	0.6 73 53	0.2 74 58	0.1 78 61	0 83 65	0.1 85 66	0.2 83 64	0.4 79 58	1.1 73 50	1.8 69 45
- █ Average max. and min. temperatures in °F
- █ Precipitation totals in inches
- Source: Weather.com / NWS
Metric conversion
J	F	M	A	M	J	J	A	S	O	N	D
75 20 8	76 20 9	62 21 10	15 23 12	5.8 23 14	2 26 16	0.5 28 18	2.5 29 19	6.1 28 18	10 26 14	28 23 10	45 21 7
- █ Average max. and min. temperatures in °C
- █ Precipitation totals in mm

Hawthorne, like the rest of the Los Angeles basin, has a Mediterranean climate:

- On average, the warmest month is August.
- The highest recorded temperature was 111 °F (44 °C) in 1961.
- On average, the coolest month is January.
- The lowest recorded temperature was 15 °F (−9 °C) in 1963.
- Most rainfall occurs during winter and spring.

Hawthorne has a Mediterranean climate or dry-summer subtropical (Köppen climate classification Csb on the coast, Csa inland), enjoying plenty of sunshine throughout the year, with an average of 263 sunshine days and only 35 days with measurable precipitation annually.

== Demographics ==
Hawthorne first appeared as a city in the 1930 U.S. Census.

=== Racial and ethnic composition ===
Hawthorne, California – Racial and Ethnic Composition Note: the US Census treats Hispanic/Latino as an ethnic category. This table excludes Latinos from the racial categories and assigns them to a separate category. Hispanics/Latinos may be of any race.
Race / Ethnicity (NH = Non-Hispanic)	Pop 1980	Pop 1990	Pop 2000	Pop 2010	Pop 2020	% 1980	% 1990	% 2000	% 2010	% 2020
White alone (NH)	32,497	21,891	10,397	8,642	9,147	57.57%	30.66%	13.00%	10.25%	10.38%
Black or African American alone (NH)	7,249	19,383	27,208	22,579	20,763	12.84%	27.15%	32.35%	26.79%	23.57%
Native American or Alaska Native alone (NH)	357	245	199	172	128	0.63%	0.34%	0.24%	0.20%	0.15%
Asian alone (NH)	4,347	7,346	5,567	5,492	6,552	7.70%	10.29%	6.62%	6.52%	7.44%
Native Hawaiian or Pacific Islander alone (NH)	4,347	7,346	685	919	683	7.70%	10.29%	0.81%	1.09%	0.78%
Other race alone (NH)	224	265	256	397	773	0.40%	0.37%	0.30%	0.47%	0.88%
Mixed race or Multiracial (NH)	x	x	2,033	1,520	2,727	x	x	2.42%	1.80%	3.10%
Hispanic or Latino (any race)	11,773	22,219	37,227	44,572	47,310	20.86%	31.12%	44.26%	52.88%	53.71%
Total	56,447	71,349	84,112	84,293	88,083	100.00%	100.00%	100.00%	100.00%	100.00%

Historical population
Census	Pop.	Note	%±
1930	6,596		—
1940	8,263		25.3%
1950	16,316		97.5%
1960	33,035		102.5%
1970	53,304		61.4%
1980	56,437		5.9%
1990	71,349		26.4%
2000	84,112		17.9%
2010	84,293		0.2%
2020	88,083		4.5%
U.S. Decennial Census; 1860–1870 1880-1890; 1900 1910 1920; 1930 1940 1950; 1960 1970 1980; 1990 2000 2010; 2020

=== 2020 census ===
As of the 2020 census, Hawthorne had a population of 88,083. The population density was 14,470.7 inhabitants per square mile (5,587.2/km^{2}).

100.0% of residents lived in urban areas, while 0.0% lived in rural areas. The census reported that 99.3% of the population lived in households, 0.2% lived in non-institutionalized group quarters, and 0.5% were institutionalized.

There were 30,541 households, out of which 37.6% included children under the age of 18, 36.8% were married-couple households, 8.3% were cohabiting couple households, 33.3% had a female householder with no spouse or partner present, and 21.7% had a male householder with no spouse or partner present. About 25.0% of households were made up of individuals, and 6.2% had someone living alone who was 65 years of age or older. The average household size was 2.86, and there were 20,718 families (67.8% of all households).

The age distribution was 23.7% under the age of 18, 9.4% aged 18 to 24, 32.1% aged 25 to 44, 24.4% aged 45 to 64, and 10.4% who were 65 years of age or older. The median age was 34.8 years. For every 100 females, there were 93.4 males, and for every 100 females age 18 and over there were 90.2 males.

There were 31,578 housing units at an average density of 5,187.8 units per square mile (2,003.0 units/km^{2}), of which 30,541 (96.7%) were occupied. Of these, 27.4% were owner-occupied, and 72.6% were occupied by renters. Of all housing units, 3.3% were vacant; the homeowner vacancy rate was 0.3%, and the rental vacancy rate was 2.8%.

=== 2023 ACS estimate ===
In 2023, the US Census Bureau estimated that the median household income was $72,719, and the per capita income was $33,651. About 13.3% of families and 16.4% of the population were below the poverty line.

=== 2010 census ===
At the 2010 census Hawthorne had a population of 84,293. The population density was 13,835.7 inhabitants per square mile (5,342.0/km^{2}). The racial makeup of Hawthorne was 27,678 (32.8%) White (10.3% Non-Hispanic White), 23,385 (27.7%) African American, 565 (0.7%) Native American, 5,642 (6.7%) Asian, 974 (1.2%) Pacific Islander, 22,127 (26.3%) from other races, and 3,922 (4.7%) from two or more races. There were 44,572 people of Hispanic or Latino origin, of any race (52.9%).

The census reported that 83,754 people (99.4% of the population) lived in households, 208 (0.2%) lived in non-institutionalized group quarters, and 331 (0.4%) were institutionalized.

There were 28,486 households, 12,330 (43.3%) had children under the age of 18 living in them, 10,833 (38.0%) were opposite-sex married couples living together, 6,369 (22.4%) had a female householder with no husband present, 2,357 (8.3%) had a male householder with no wife present. There were 2,309 (8.1%) unmarried opposite-sex partnerships, and 191 (0.7%) same-sex married couples or partnerships. Of the households, 7,125 (25.0%) were one person and 1,430 (5.0%) had someone living alone who was 65 or older. The average household size was 2.94. There were 19,559 families (68.7% of households); the average family size was 3.54.

The age distribution was 23,157 people (27.5%) under the age of 18, 9,487 people (11.3%) aged 18 to 24, 27,035 people (32.1%) aged 25 to 44, 18,395 people (21.8%) aged 45 to 64, and 6,219 people (7.4%) who were 65 or older. The median age was 31.5 years. For every 100 females, there were 93.2 males. For every 100 females age 18 and over, there were 89.6 males.

There were 29,869 housing units at an average density of 4,902.7 per square mile, of the occupied units 7,623 (26.8%) were owner-occupied and 20,863 (73.2%) were rented. The homeowner vacancy rate was 1.5%; the rental vacancy rate was 4.6%. 25,869 people (30.7% of the population) lived in owner-occupied housing units and 57,885 people (68.7%) lived in rental housing units.

During 2009–2013, Hawthorne had a median household income of $44,649, with 19.2% of the population living below the federal poverty line.

According to Mapping L.A. in 2000, Mexican (27.1%) and Filipino (2.6%) were the most common ancestries in the city. Mexico (45.1%) and Guatemala (9.3%) were the most common foreign places of birth in the city.

=== Homelessness ===
Homeless population
Year	Pop.	±%
2016	106	—
2017	95	−10.4%
2018	149	+56.8%
2019	108	−27.5%
2020	208	+92.6%
2022	173	−16.8%
Source: Greater Los Angeles Homeless Count; Los Angeles Homeless Services Authority

In 2022, Los Angeles Homeless Services Authority's Greater Los Angeles Homeless Count counted 173 homeless individuals in Hawthorne.

== Economy ==
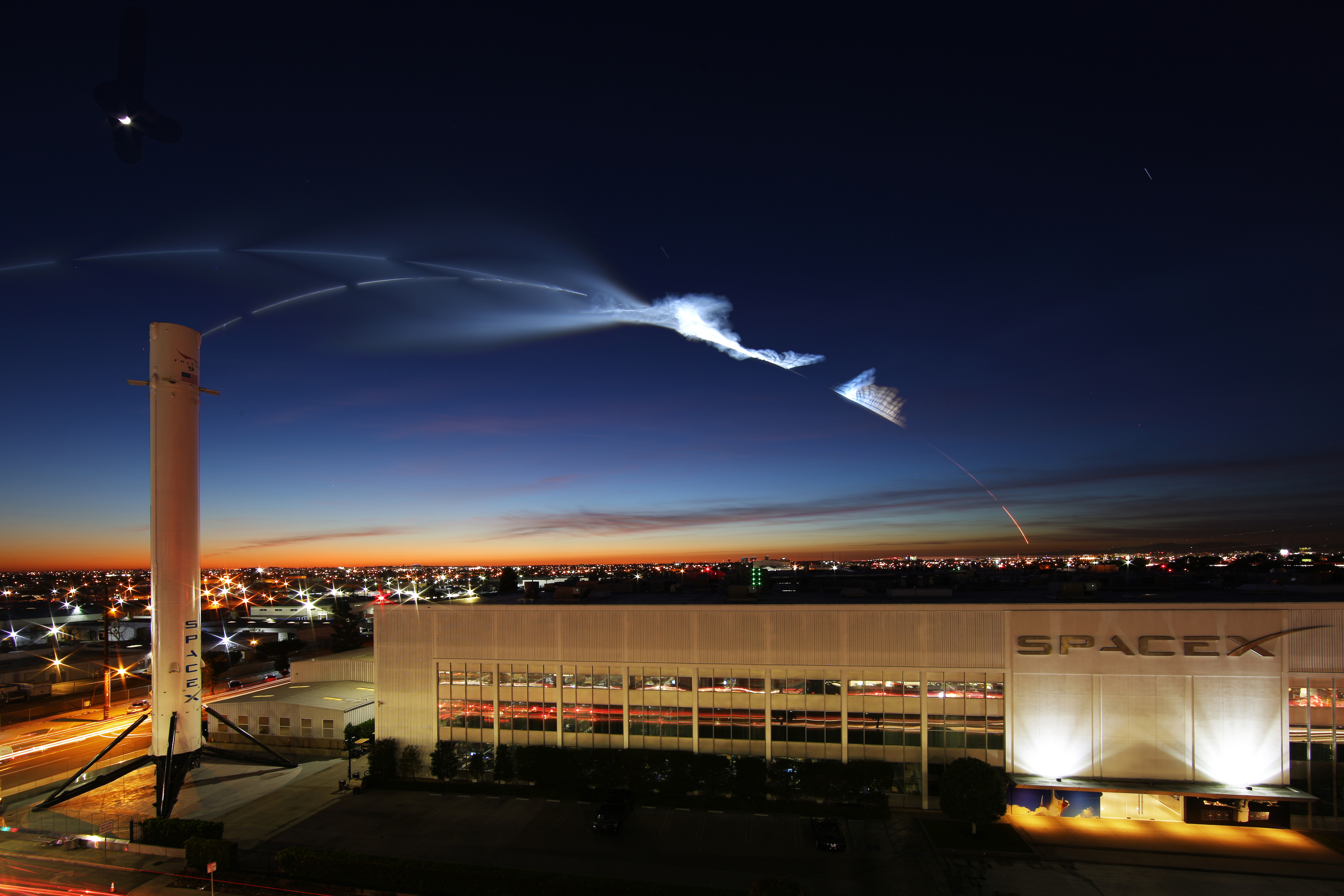
SpaceX's former headquarters in Hawthorne before its move to SpaceX Starbase in Brownsville, Texas in 2024.

As of 2022 the city is known as a center for the space industry and hosts numerous space related private companies, industries and startups. The relatively large number of aerospace engineers and technicians, history of established aerospace companies, and the presence of SpaceX has facilitated the development of space engineering industry cluster in the city. According to the city's 2021 Comprehensive Annual Financial Report, the top employers in the city are:

#	Employer	# of Employees
1	SpaceX	6,094
2	Amazon Fulfillment Center	1,500
3	Hawthorne School District	900
4	Wiseburn Unified School District	394
5	City of Hawthorne	360
6	Home Depot	340
7	OSI Systems	280
8	Expeditors	260
9	Teledyne Relays	253
10	Target	250

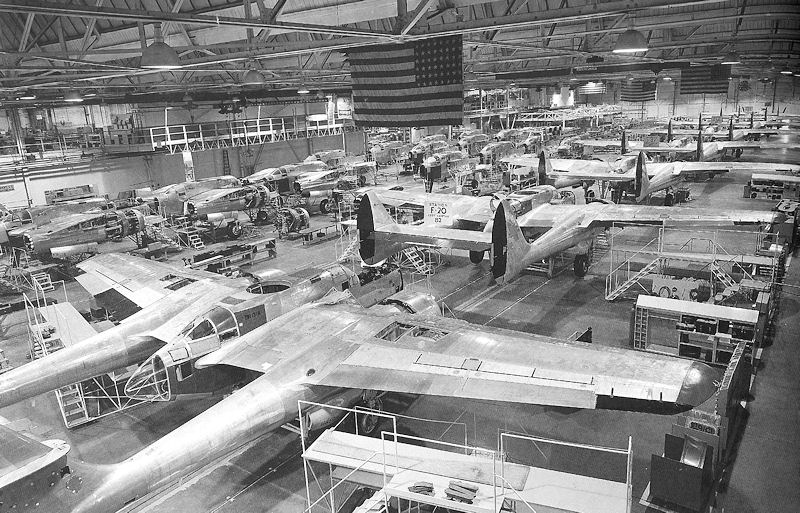
P-61s being built by Northrop Corp. during World War II in Hawthorne

Besides the current top employers, the following businesses are currently located in Hawthorne:

- Century Media Records, independent rock label.
- Tesla, Inc. has its design center at the Hawthorne Municipal Airport.
- Konami Digital Entertainment has its US offices in Hawthorne.
- ARCH Motorcycle is headquartered in Hawthorne.
- Mynaric has an office and laboratory in Hawthorne.

Previously in Hawthorne:

- Mattel (formerly), toy manufacturer; originally started in Hawthorne in 1945 and moved to their current facility in nearby El Segundo, California by 1991.
- Hawthorne Plaza, a regional shopping center, now closed
- The Boring Company, infrastructure and tunnel construction services company.
- Northrop Corporation, founded in 1939 and headquartered in Hawthorne, became a major manufacturer of aircraft during World War II, as well as a major subcontractor to other aircraft companies. Jack Northrop developed his famous flying wings, which ultimately led to the B-2 stealth bomber. Northrop also produced the P-61 Black Widow fighter in its Hawthorne plant, which was on the south side of Northrop Field (present-day Hawthorne Airport). The facility was, for some time, used as an aircraft plant, producing fuselage sections for Boeing 747s and 787s. The building is currently used as the headquarters and main factory of SpaceX.

== Government ==
=== Municipal government ===
Hawthorne has an elected city council composed of a mayor elected every four years and four city council members elected on four year terms.

Current City Council Members
OFFICE	OFFICE HOLDER	TERM ENDS
Mayor	Alex Vargas	December 2028
Mayor Pro Tem	Angie Reyes-English	December 2028
Councilmember	Faye Johnson	December 2028
Councilmember	Alex Monteiro	December 2026
Councilmember	Katrina Manning	December 2026

Elected Officials
OFFICE	OFFICE HOLDER	TERM ENDS
City Treasurer	Marie Poindexter-Hornback	December 2026
City Clerk	Dayna Williams-Hunter	December 2026

According to the city's most recent "Comprehensive Annual Financial Report," its various funds had $126.1 million in revenues, $113.2 million in expenditures, $220.2 million in total assets, $152.7 million in total liabilities, and $29.6 million in cash and investments. The city manager is Vontray Norris.

=== State and federal representation ===
In the California State Legislature, Hawthorne is in the 35th senatorial district, represented by Democrat Laura Richardson, and in the 61st Assembly district, represented by Democrat Tina McKinnor.

In the United States House of Representatives, Hawthorne is in California's 43rd congressional district, represented by Democrat Maxine Waters.

== Education ==
=== Primary and secondary schools ===
Hawthorne is served by multiple school districts. Schools that include portions of Hawthorne include:

Centinela Valley Union High School District

- Hawthorne High School
- Leuzinger High School (Lawndale, California)
- Lawndale High School (Lawndale, California)

Hawthorne School District
Lawndale Elementary School District

- Franklin D. Roosevelt-Kit Carson Elementary School (Alondra Park)
- Will Rogers Middle School (Lawndale)

Lennox School District

- Elementary schools with boundaries coinciding include: Buford, Felton, Jefferson, Dolores Hutera and Moffett
- All district residents are zoned to Lennox Middle School (grades 6–8)

Wiseburn Unified School District

- Juan Cabrillo Elementary School (Kindergarten-2nd grade)
- 138th St School (3rd-5th grade) (To Be Renamed)
- Richard Henry Dana Middle School (6th-8th grade)
- Da Vinci Schools (9th-12th grade)

Los Angeles Unified School District

- Cimarron Elementary School (Hawthorne)
- Clay Middle School (Unincorporated area)
- Washington Preparatory High School (Unincorporated area)

In addition Los Angeles County Office of Education operates Southwest Day (5th-12th grade).

Hawthorne Math and Science Academy is a charter high school in Hawthorne associated with the Hawthorne School District.

=== Private schools ===
- Saint Joseph's Parish School (Catholic, Roman Catholic Archdiocese of Los Angeles)
- Trinity Lutheran School
- Al Huda Islamic School

=== Colleges and universities ===
Los Angeles Community College District

- Los Angeles Southwest College (in an unincorporated area in Los Angeles County)
- El Camino College

== Media ==
The Hawthorne Press Tribune is the community newspaper for the City of Hawthorne.

== Infrastructure ==
The Los Angeles County Department of Health Services operates the Curtis Tucker Health Center in Inglewood, serving Hawthorne.

The United States Postal Service Hawthorne Post Office is located at 12700 Inglewood Avenue.

== Notable people ==
- All of the original members of the Beach Boys grew up in Hawthorne—Brian, Dennis and Carl Wilson, Mike Love, and Al Jardine—as did early member David Marks. The Wilsons' childhood home is commemorated by the Beach Boys Historic Landmark.
- Carl Boenish, base jumper
- NFL players Curtis Conway, Jason Simmons, and Dennis Northcutt have all resided in Hawthorne.
- Fred Dryer, defensive end in the NFL, actor and producer, was born in Hawthorne in 1946
- Political activist turned serial killer John Ewell lived in and committed his crimes in Hawthorne
- Domo Genesis of former rap collective OFWGKTA was born in Hawthorne.
- Singer-songwriter Cuco grew up and currently resides in Hawthorne.
- NEA chairman Dana Gioia was born and reared in Hawthorne.
- Jazz critic and music historian Ted Gioia was born and raised in Hawthorne and graduated from Hawthorne High.
- Tracy Jones, former Major League Baseball player and 700 WLW radio host, was born in Hawthorne.
- Rapper Kurupt lived in Hawthorne after moving from Philadelphia.
- Scott Laidlaw, running back for the Dallas Cowboys and the New York Giants of the NFL, was born in Hawthorne, grew up in Hawthorne, and went to Hawthorne High School.
- Michael Marsh, Olympic gold medalist, attended Hawthorne High
- Mike McDermott, former member of the Maryland House of Delegates, was born in Hawthorne.
- Keyla Monterroso Mejia, actress and comedian
- Actress Marilyn Monroe lived in the city from infancy until she was 6.
- Singer Chris Montez grew up in Hawthorne.
- Jack Northrop founded and managed Northrop Corporation, which was headquartered in Hawthorne (see Economy section above).
- Actor Butch Patrick of TV's The Munsters lived in Hawthorne for a short time.
- Red Cloud, American rapper of indigenous Mexican descent, was born in Hawthorne.
- Musician Emitt Rhodes lived in Hawthorne.
- Major League Baseball pitcher (New York Mets and Houston Astros) and Cy Young Award winner Mike Scott grew up in Hawthorne and graduated from Hawthorne High School in 1973.
- Film and stage actress Betta St. John was born in Hawthorne.
- Rapper Big Syke lived in Hawthorne
- Sports figure Jim Thorpe resided in Hawthorne during part of his life, and there is a park named after him.
- Rapper Tyler, the Creator grew up in Hawthorne. The name of the city is seen on the cover of his album Call Me If You Get Lost.
- Russell Westbrook of the Denver Nuggets grew up in Hawthorne.
- Dorell Wright of the Portland Trail Blazers grew up in Hawthorne.
- Gyasi Zardes of the Columbus Crew SC grew up in Hawthorne.

== See also ==
- List of sundown towns in the United States
