= Centinela Valley Union High School District =

School district in California

Address
- 14901 South Inglewood Avenue Lawndale, California, 90260; United States

District information
- Type: Union high school district
- Grades: 9–12; adult
- Established: 1905; 120 years ago
- Superintendent: Dr. Stephen Nellman
- School board: Estefany Castañeda, President; Hugo Rojas, Vice-President, Gloria Ramos; Marisela Ruiz; Nohemi Ramírez, Clerk
- Accreditation: Western Association of Schools and Colleges, Accrediting Commission for Schools
- Schools: Hawthorne High School; Lawndale High School; Leuzinger High School; Lloyde Continuation High School
- Budget: $75,141,157 (2008–09)
- NCES District ID: 0607920

Students and staff
- Enrollment: 6787 (2009–10)
- Staff: 318 (2008–09)
- Student–teacher ratio: 23.0 (2008–09)

Other information
- Website: www.centinela.k12.ca.us

Centinela Valley Union High School District, (CVUHSD) is a public union high school district located in southern California that serves about 6,800 students in grades 9–12 from all of Lawndale and Lennox, most of Hawthorne and Alondra Park (a.k.a. El Camino Village), and a small portion of Inglewood. The district's three associated elementary feeder school districts are Hawthorne School District, Lawndale Elementary School District, and Lennox School District. Previously Wiseburn Unified School District, now a unified district, fed into CVUSD. The Centinela Valley district also offers adult education classes.

Students attend Hawthorne High School, Lawndale High School, Leuzinger High School, or the continuation school, Lloyde Continuation High School.

== History ==
The district has as its basis the 1905 formation of the Inglewood Union High School District, which included at the outset the territories of Hawthorne, Inglewood, Lennox, and Wiseburn school districts. In 1912 the El Segundo school district formed out of territory in the Wiseburn district and was a part of the Inglewood high school district. El Segundo withdrew from CVUHSD on November 22, 1925, when the El Segundo Unified School District was formed.

The high school district was named Centinela Valley Union High School District on November 1, 1944. On July 1, 1954, Inglewood, with its Inglewood and Morningside high schools, withdrew to form the Inglewood Unified School District.

In 2004 the areas in the Wiseburn School District had made a proposal to break away from Centinela Valley Union. Cheryl M. White became the superintendent in 2004.

Jose Fernandez became the superintendent in 2008. He received $663,000 in total compensation in 2013. This fact was revealed in a 2014 newspaper investigation. The superintendent of the Los Angeles Unified School District, John Deasy, had an annual salary of $390,000. KCAL-TV stated that a crowd appeared asking for Fernandez to resign. Fernandez stated that he had made improvements to CVUSD. The board later put Fernandez on paid leave and selected Bob Cox as the interim superintendent. The District Attorney of Los Angeles County began investigating the district.

In 2014 the Daily Breeze reported that TELACU, a company which received building contracts worth millions of US dollars from the high school district, had bankrolled election campaigns of board members.

In 2014 the Wiseburn Elementary School district unified and became the Wiseburn USD, and so its area left the Centinela Valley high school district.

In 2021 a block of unincorporated areas that was in the Lawndale School District and Centinela Valley USD voted on a proposal on whether it should move to Wiseburn USD; previously students living in the block living in Wiseburn would have had to get permission from their zoned school districts to attend Wiseburn. According to Hunter Lee the Daily Breeze, "few" people voted in the election. The vote to transfer the area to Wiseburn was approved.

== Administration ==
In the 2011-2012 school year the district spent $6,900,000 on district administration. Salaries and benefits made up slightly over 50% of the spending. Conferences, financial consulting services, legal fees, and travel made up the remainder. In the 2011-2012 school year the district spent $1,150 per student on districtwide administrative costs. During that school year, the average administrative cost per student of the California school districts was $468. CVUHSD's administrative per pupil cost was the second highest in Los Angeles County after that of the Gorman Elementary School District.

== Academic performance ==
As of 2004 the district average Academic Performance Index (API) was 549. The California average at the time was 693, and the Los Angeles County average was 676. In a two-year period ending in 2004 the district did not make the progress mandated by the No Child Left Behind Act (NCLB). Jean Merl of the Los Angeles Times stated that some residents of the Hawthorne School District and Lennox School District had created charter schools which had "signaled their continuing dissatisfaction" with the Centinela Valley district.

== District service area ==
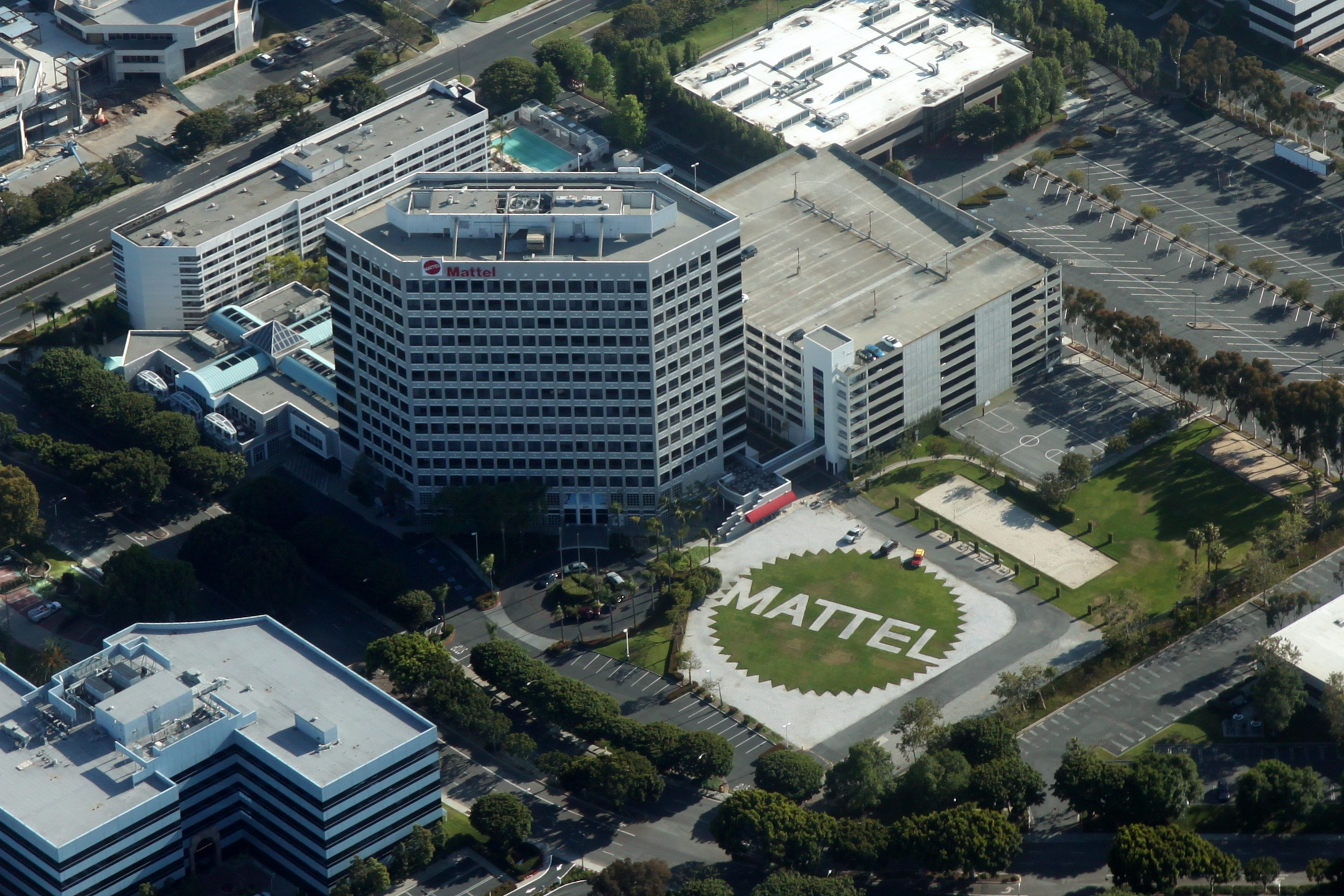
Corporate operations in El Segundo, such as those of Mattel (headquarters pictured here) provide significant tax revenue for the district

As of 2023 the district includes all of Lawndale and Lennox, most of Hawthorne and Alondra Park (a.k.a. El Camino Village), and a small portion of Inglewood. The CVUSD district formerly covered portions of El Segundo, and Del Aire.

The area within the Wiseburn School District area as a whole, as of 2002, generated about 40% of the assessed property value of the entire Centinela Valley district. Jean Merl of the Los Angeles Times wrote in 2004 that Wiseburn "provides by far the largest portion of [the Centinela Valley Union High School District]'s assessed property tax valuation." As of 2014, most students within the Wiseburn School District do not matriculate to Centinela Valley after leaving the 8th grade. In November 2013 the voters in the Wiseburn school district voted to separate from Centinela Valley and establish a high school for the Wiseburn district. In 2014 the CVUSD district included a portion of eastern El Segundo with a high concentration of businesses and no residents. This area, also within the Wiseburn School District, houses operations of various companies, including Boeing, Mattel, Northrop Grumman, Raytheon Technologies, and Xerox. As of 2014 the concentration of businesses gives about 33% of the funds towards any approved school bond. CVUSD had passed two bonds, each worth almost $100 million, from 2008 to 2014.

== Schools ==
- Hawthorne High School
- Lawndale High School
- Leuzinger High School

Former

- Lennox High School
