= Del Aire, California =

- Unincorporated community Census designated place
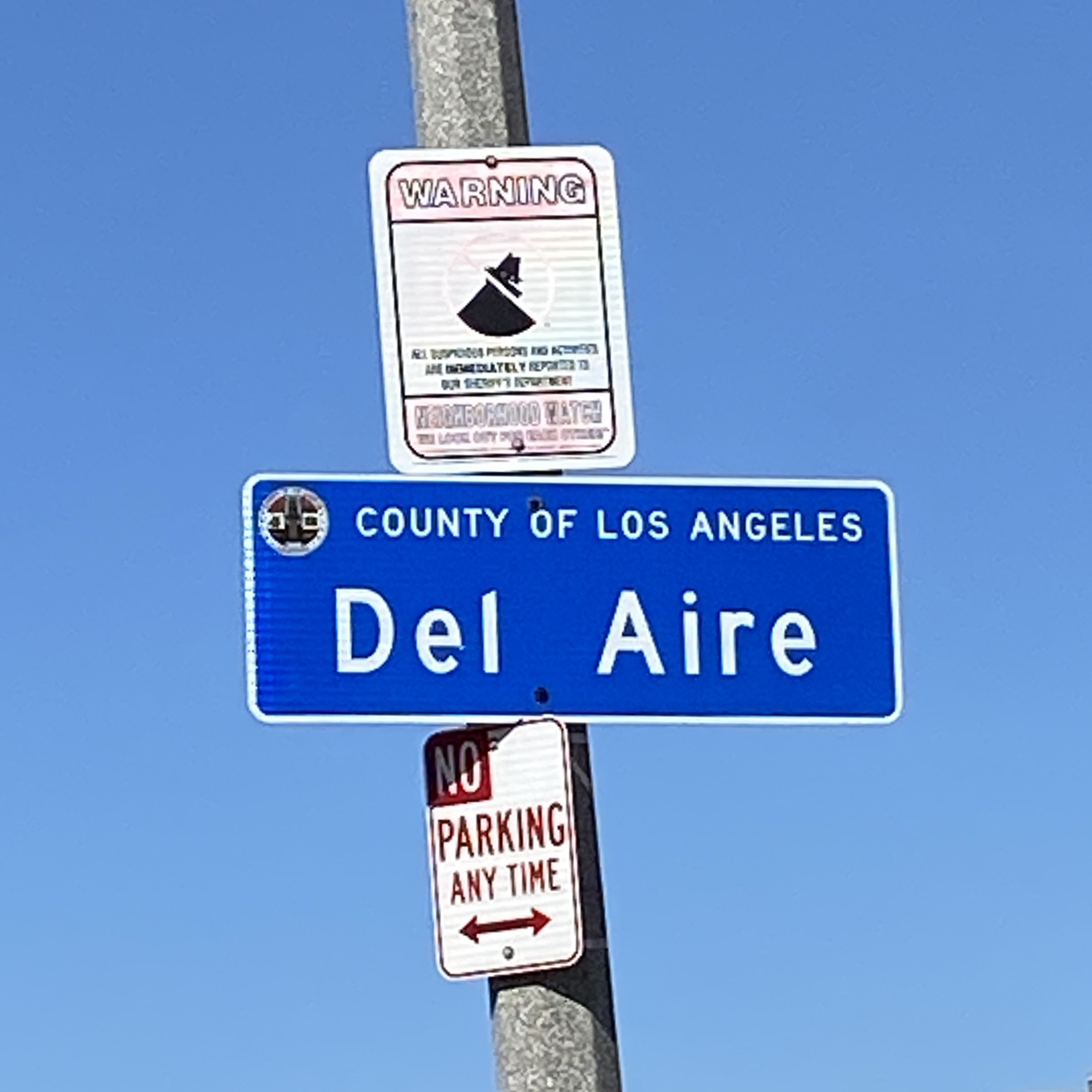
- Interactive map of Del Aire, California
- Location in the United States
- Coordinates: 33°54′58″N 118°22′9″W
- Country: United States
- State: California
- County: Los Angeles

Area
  - Total: 1.01 sq mi (2.61 km^{2})
  - Land: 1.01 sq mi (2.61 km^{2})
  - Water: 0 sq mi (0.00 km^{2}) 0%
- Elevation: 102 ft (31 m)

Population (2020)
  - Total: 10,338
  - Density: 10,252.8/sq mi (3,958.61/km^{2})
- Time zone: UTC-8 (PST)
  - Summer (DST): UTC-7 (PDT)
- ZIP code: 90250 & 90304
- Area codes: 310/424
- FIPS code: 06-18352
- GNIS feature IDs: 1867012, 2408648

Del Aire (/dɛl ˈɛər/;; Spanish: [del ˈajɾe]; Spanish for "Of the Air") is an unincorporated community and census designated place (CDP) in the inland South Bay, Los Angeles County, California, United States, between El Segundo and Hawthorne. The population was 10,338 at the 2020 census, up from 10,001 at the 2010 census.

Del Aire is a small unincorporated residential neighborhood next to the Interstate 405/Interstate 105 interchange. It consists of two roughly rectangular shaped parts:

- one to the northwest bounded by I-105 and the City of Los Angeles on the north, El Segundo on the west, Hawthorne on the east, and El Segundo Blvd. on the south, and
- one to the southeast bounded by El Segundo Blvd. on the north and surrounded by Hawthorne on the east, south and west.

The two parts are connected by a sliver of land across El Segundo Blvd.

The Los Angeles Airport Courthouse is in the Del Aire CDP. Aviation/Imperial station on the Metro C Line light rail line is in Los Angeles proper, adjacent to the CDP, and the Los Angeles Air Force Base is in El Segundo, adjacent to Del Aire CDP.

== Geography ==
Del Aire is located at 33°54′58″N 118°22′9″W (33.916138, -118.369282).

According to the United States Census Bureau, the CDP has a total area of 1.0 square mile (2.6 km^{2}), all land.

The precise boundaries of Del Aire are complex, but can be roughly described as the area south of Imperial Highway between Aviation Boulevard and the San Diego Freeway(I-405) to El Segundo Boulevard. The CDP also includes the area east of the freeway and west of Inglewood Avenue, roughly between El Segundo Boulevard and Rosecrans Avenue, designated "Wiseburn" by L.A. County.

== Education ==
All of Del Aire is part of the Wiseburn Unified School District. Schools that are part of the Wiseburn School District that are in Del Aire are Juan De Anza Elementary (K–5th Grade) and Da Vinci Design Charter School (9–12).

Juan Cabrillo Elementary (K–2), 138th Street Elementary (3–5), Richard Henry Dana Middle School and Da Vinci Science Charter School are south of Del Aire in the Hawthorne community known as Hollyglen.

Previously portions of Del Aire to the south were covered by the Lawndale Elementary School District and the Centinela Valley Union High School District. Additionally, when Wiseburn was only an elementary school district, Centinela Valley UHSD served as the high school district for that area. Wiseburn USD became a unified district, and therefore left Centinela Valley UHSD, in 2014. In 2021 a block of unincorporated areas that was in the Lawndale School District and Centinela Valley USD voted on a proposal on whether it should move to Wiseburn USD; previously students living in the block living in Wiseburn would have had to get permission from their zoned school districts to attend Wiseburn. According to Hunter Lee the Daily Breeze, "few" people voted in the election. The vote to transfer the area to Wiseburn was approved.

== Demographics ==
Historical population
Census	Pop.	Note	%±
1970	11,930		—
1980	8,487		−28.9%
1990	8,040		−5.3%
2000	9,012		12.1%
2010	10,001		11.0%
2020	10,338		3.4%
U.S. Decennial Census; 1860–1870 1880-1890; 1900 1910 1920; 1930 1940 1950; 1960 1970 1980; 1990 2000 2010; 2020

Del Aire first appeared as an unincorporated community in the 1970 U.S. census; and as a census designated place in the 1980 United States census.

=== Racial and ethnic composition ===
Del Aire CDP, California – Racial and ethnic composition Note: the US Census treats Hispanic/Latino as an ethnic category. This table excludes Latinos from the racial categories and assigns them to a separate category. Hispanics/Latinos may be of any race.
Race / Ethnicity (NH = Non-Hispanic)	Pop 1980	Pop 1990	Pop 2000	Pop 2010	Pop 2020	% 1980	% 1990	% 2000	% 2010	% 2020
White alone (NH)	6,547	5,272	3,793	3,458	3,200	77.14%	65.57%	42.09%	34.58%	30.95%
Black or African American alone (NH)	92	178	342	431	484	1.08%	2.21%	3.79%	4.31%	4.68%
Native American or Alaska Native alone (NH)	19	37	35	24	18	0.22%	0.46%	0.39%	0.24%	0.17%
Asian alone (NH)	398	648	711	901	1,058	4.69%	8.06%	7.89%	9.01%	10.23%
Native Hawaiian or Pacific Islander alone (NH)	398	648	63	128	103	4.69%	8.06%	0.70%	1.28%	1.00%
Other race alone (NH)	32	21	30	41	79	0.38%	0.26%	0.33%	0.41%	0.76%
Mixed race or Multiracial (NH)	x	x	287	294	519	x	x	3.18%	2.94%	5.02%
Hispanic or Latino (any race)	1,398	1,884	3,751	4,724	4,877	16.47%	23.43%	41.62%	47.24%	47.18%
Total	8,487	8,040	9,012	10,001	10,338	100.00%	100.00%	100.00%	100.00%	100.00%

=== 2020 census ===
As of the 2020 census, Del Aire had a population of 10,338 and a population density of 10,256.0 inhabitants per square mile (3,959.9/km^{2}). 100.0% of residents lived in urban areas, while 0.0% lived in rural areas.

The census reported that 99.9% of the population lived in households, 0.1% lived in non-institutionalized group quarters, and no one was institutionalized. The median age was 38.8 years. 20.3% of residents were under the age of 18, 8.4% were aged 18 to 24, 30.9% were aged 25 to 44, 26.7% were aged 45 to 64, and 13.8% were 65 years of age or older. For every 100 females, there were 99.4 males, and for every 100 females age 18 and over there were 98.6 males age 18 and over.

There were 3,576 households, out of which 34.3% included children under the age of 18, 52.5% were married-couple households, 6.2% were cohabiting couple households, 22.8% had a female householder with no partner present, and 18.5% had a male householder with no partner present. 21.2% of households were one person, and 7.1% were one person aged 65 or older. The average household size was 2.89. There were 2,558 families (71.5% of all households).

There were 3,713 housing units at an average density of 3,683.5 units per square mile (1,422.2 units/km^{2}), of which 3,576 (96.3%) were occupied. Of the occupied units, 63.9% were owner-occupied and 36.1% were occupied by renters. 3.7% of housing units were vacant; the homeowner vacancy rate was 0.4% and the rental vacancy rate was 5.3%.

During 2019–2023, Del Aire had a median household income of $142,566, with 8.4% of the population living below the federal poverty line.

=== 2010 census ===
The 2010 United States census reported that Del Aire had a population of 10,001. The population density was 9,864.4 inhabitants per square mile (3,808.7/km^{2}). The racial makeup of Del Aire was 6,052 (60.5%) White (34.6% Non-Hispanic White), 458 (4.6%) African American, 60 (0.6%) Native American, 922 (9.2%) Asian, 131 (1.3%) Pacific Islander, 1,815 (18.1%) from other races, and 563 (5.6%) from two or more races. Hispanic or Latino of any race were 4,724 persons (47.2%).

The census reported that 9,989 people (99.9% of the population) lived in households, 9 (0.1%) lived in non-institutionalized group quarters, and 3 (0%) were institutionalized.

There were 3,291 households, out of which 1,220 (37.1%) had children under the age of 18 living in them, 1,764 (53.6%) were opposite-sex married couples living together, 420 (12.8%) had a female householder with no husband present, 191 (5.8%) had a male householder with no wife present. There were 197 (6.0%) unmarried opposite-sex partnerships, and 26 (0.8%) same-sex married couples or partnerships. 674 households (20.5%) were made up of individuals, and 213 (6.5%) had someone living alone who was 65 years of age or older. The average household size was 3.04. There were 2,375 families (72.2% of all households); the average family size was 3.56.

The population was spread out, with 2,328 people (23.3%) under the age of 18, 956 people (9.6%) aged 18 to 24, 3,049 people (30.5%) aged 25 to 44, 2,607 people (26.1%) aged 45 to 64, and 1,061 people (10.6%) who were 65 years of age or older. The median age was 36.0 years. For every 100 females, there were 100.5 males. For every 100 females age 18 and over, there were 97.3 males.

There were 3,428 housing units at an average density of 3,381.2 per square mile (1,305.5/km^{2}), of which 2,268 (68.9%) were owner-occupied, and 1,023 (31.1%) were occupied by renters. The homeowner vacancy rate was 0.5%; the rental vacancy rate was 5.2%. 7,413 people (74.1% of the population) lived in owner-occupied housing units and 2,576 people (25.8%) lived in rental housing units.

During 2009–2013, Del Aire had a median household income of $80,833, with 9.1% of the population living below the federal poverty line.

== Infrastructure ==
The Los Angeles County Sheriff's Department operates the South Los Angeles Station in Westmont, California, serving Del Aire.

== Government ==
In the California State Legislature, Del Aire is in the 35th senatorial district, represented by Democrat Laura Richardson, and in the 61st Assembly district, represented by Democrat Tina McKinnor.

In the United States House of Representatives, Del Aire is in California's 43rd congressional district, represented by Democrat Maxine Waters.
