= Wiseburn Unified School District =

School district in California, US

Address
- Da Vinci high schools: 201 North Douglas Street El Segundo, California, 90245; United States

District information
- Type: Public
- Grades: K–12 (K-8 prior to 2014)
- NCES District ID: 0601428

Students and staff
- Students: ≈ 3000 (2024-2025)
- Teachers: 95 (FTE)
- Staff: 319 (FTE)
- Student–teacher ratio: 31.57:1

Other information
- Website: www.wiseburn.org

The Wiseburn Unified School District is a school district in Los Angeles County, California, operating elementary and middle schools, and hosting charter high schools. Its headquarters are on the grounds of the Da Vinci charter schools facility in El Segundo. Previously they were in Hawthorne.

== History ==
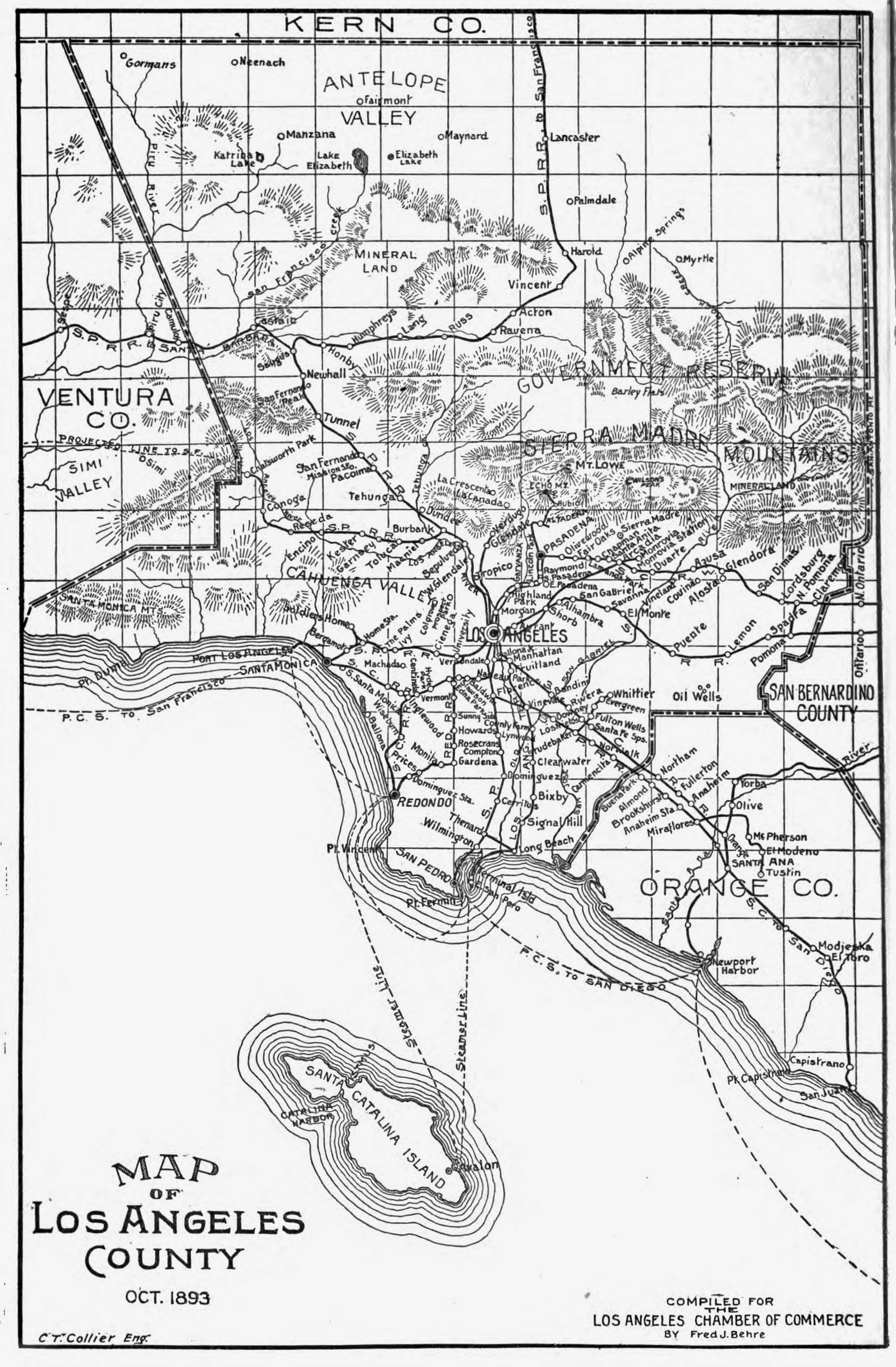
Wiseburn depot on a map of Los Angeles County published October 1893 for the World's Columbian Exposition

It was established on March 8, 1896, and was named after the Wiseburn Depot. The district initially included Hermosa Beach, Lawndale, Manhattan Beach, and North Redondo Beach.

In 1912 the El Segundo School District opened, taking territory from Wiseburn. Circa 1913 Manhattan Beach, which had a school, split off from Wiseburn School District into its own elementary school district (now Manhattan Beach Unified School District). Other areas left for other school districts, and therefore Wiseburn school district's territory decreased in size.

There was a movement for the Wiseburn district to secede from the Centinela Valley Union High School District which began as a signature collection drive around 2001. In 2002 the Los Angeles County Committee on School District Organization recommended that the vote to secede go forward but that the entire Centinela Valley area, and not just Wiseburn, vote on the secession issue. Wiseburn alone had 6,400 registered voters living in its boundaries while the entirety of Centinela Valley had 54,000 registered voters. Sandra Murillo of the Los Angeles Times stated that having the entire Centinela district vote on the matter would make it less likely to pass. The leadership of the Centinela Valley district was in favor of the entire district voting on the matter. In 2004 all board members of the California Board of Education except for one, who abstained, voted to declare that the vote on whether Wiseburn may secede should only be decided within Wiseburn's boundaries. An election was scheduled for March 8, 2005, but in December 2004, David Yaffe, a Los Angeles Superior Court judge, granted a request from the Centinela district for a preliminary injunction, putting an abeyance on the election.

On November 5, 2013, 92.63% of the district's voters participating in the election favored the establishment of Wiseburn as a unified school district, permitting it to establish a high school. The district unified in July 2014, which meant Centinela Valley UHSD no longer covered Wiseburn USD territory.

In 2021 a block of unincorporated areas that was in the Lawndale School District and Centinela Valley USD voted on a proposal on whether it should move to Wiseburn USD; previously students living in the block living in Wiseburn would have had to get permission from their zoned school districts to attend Wiseburn. According to Hunter Lee the Daily Breeze, "few" people voted in the election. The vote to transfer the area to Wiseburn was approved.

== District boundaries ==
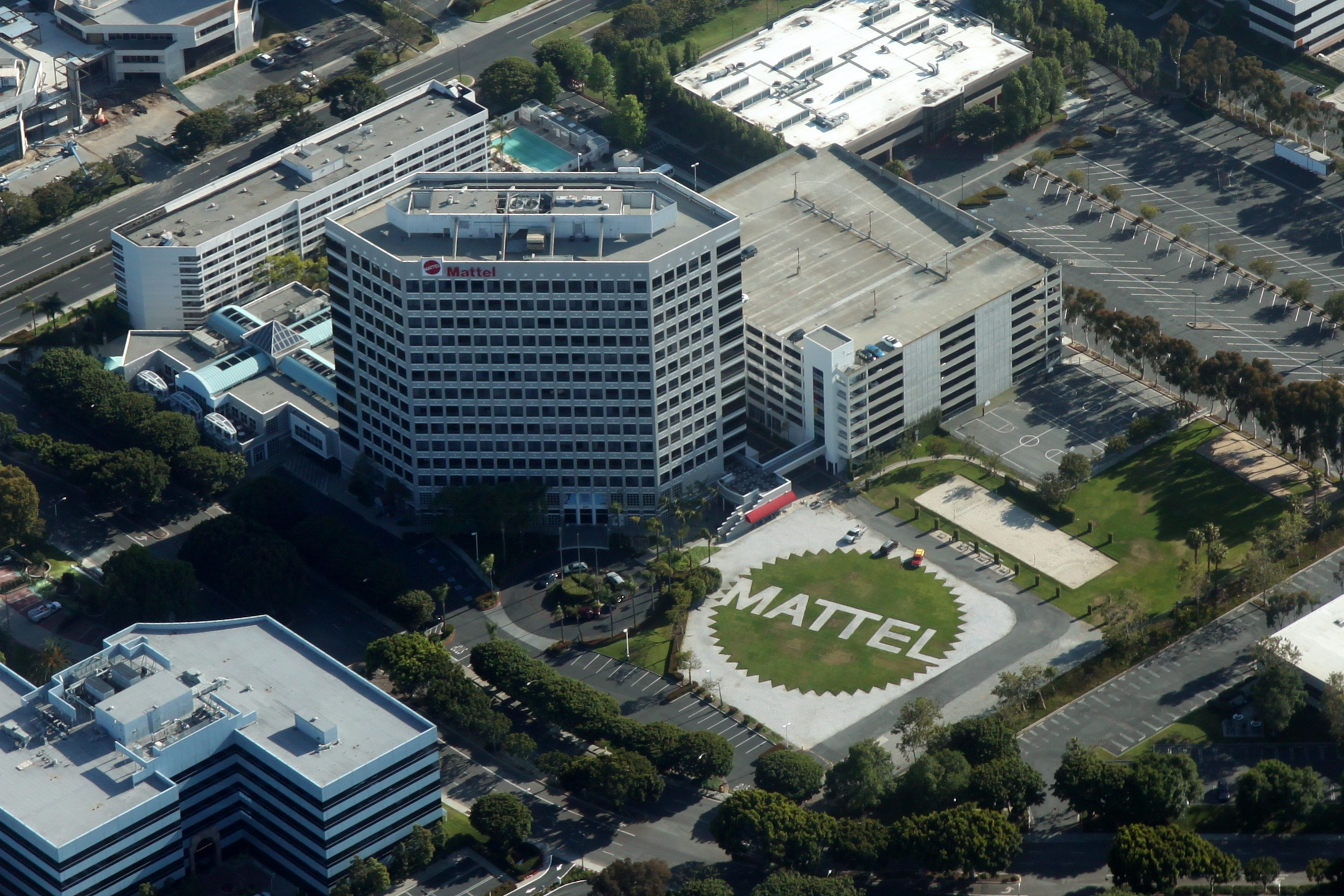
Corporate operations in El Segundo, such as those of Mattel (headquarters pictured here) provide significant tax revenue for the district

The district has a territory of about 4 square miles (10 km^{2}). The district serves Hollyglen, located in western Hawthorne, and Del Aire and Wiseburn, unincorporated areas south of Los Angeles International Airport. About 50% of the district is located in the city of El Segundo.

As of 2004 the district receives large amounts of property taxes from aerospace and high technology industries in eastern El Segundo. This area has no residential population. As of 2014 the companies in that area include AIG, Boeing, Mattel, Northrop Grumman, Raytheon, and Xerox. With the money from the area, the Wiseburn district had rebuilt all four of its schools in the 2000s. The Wiseburn district as a whole, as of 2002, generates about 40% of the assessed property value of the entire Centinela Valley district. Jean Merl of the Los Angeles Times wrote in 2004 that Wiseburn "provides by far the largest portion of [the Centinela Valley Union High School District]'s assessed property tax valuation." The companies contributed about 80% of the Wiseburn district's $87 million 2010 school bond.

== Demographics ==
In 2004 the school district had 2,000 students. At the time, about 33% were transfers from other school districts. As of 2014 the district allows parents in the Ladera Heights community and the Los Angeles neighborhoods of Mar Vista, Playa del Rey, Playa Vista, and Westchester to send their children to Wiseburn schools on inter-district transfers.

== Student performance ==
As of 2004 the Wiseburn district Academic Performance Index (API) was 784. That year Jean Merl of the Los Angeles Times described the Wiseburn district as being "high-performing".

== Schools ==
Zoned schools:

- Wiseburn Middle School (Formerly R.H Dana Middle School) (6-8) (Hawthorne)
  - Dana is located in Hollyglen. Its current building opened in 2007.
- Del Aire Elementary School (Formerly Juan De Anza Elementary) (K-5) (Unincorporated area)
  - The current Anza building opened in the northern hemisphere fall of 2002.
- Aviation Elementary School (Formerly 138th St. Elementary) (3-5) (Hawthorne)
  - It was modernized in 1999.
- Hollyglen Elementary School (Formerly Juan Cabrillo Elementary) (K-2) (Hawthorne)
  - In June 2007, 83% of district voters approved bonds to build a new campus for Cabrillo. In December 2008 the building's construction was complete.

Charter schools:

- Da Vinci Design Charter School (9-12)
  - The school opened in August 2009 as a way to provide an alternative high school.
- Da Vinci Science Charter School (9-12)
  - The school opened in August 2009 as a way to provide an alternative high school.
- Da Vinci Communications Charter School (9-12)
- Da Vinci Connect (K-8)
  - Opened in August 2011.

As of 2017 the Da Vinci Design, Science, and Communications charters serve as the zoned high schools of people living in Wiseburn USD.

The charter high schools do not have all of the offerings of a traditional comprehensive high school and instead are specialized schools.

=== Wiseburn High School ===
The district has a Wiseburn High School campus which houses three independent charter high schools. These charter schools are: Da Vinci Communications, Da Vinci Design, and Da Vinci Science. The district voters approved an $87 million bond to build the high school in November 2010. This was the first time that a California elementary school district approved bonds intended for constructing a high school. In 2013 the district completed an environmental impact report. The district intended to open the new campus in August 2017.

In March 2013 the district closed escrow on the building's sale and approved the environmental studies. The City of El Segundo objected to the sale. The city administration officially stated the reasons as being noise, parking, and traffic, while Wiseburn officials stated the city feared losing tax revenue by having a former office building be converted to a school. The city cannot make taxes off of public schools.

The school is being established in the 201 N. Douglas St. building, on a 2-acre (0.81 ha) plot of land across the street from the Los Angeles Air Force Base and near El Segundo Boulevard. The facility, bought by the Wiseburn district for $46 million, was formerly leased by Northrop Grumman and owned by Douglas Property Holdings Co., LLC. In January 2014 Northrop had moved its employees out of the building and to Redondo Beach. On January 13 of that year, the ownership changed from Douglas Property Holdings Co., LLC. to Continental Development Corp., a company owned by El Segundo landowner Richard Lundquist. On the same day the Wiseburn district assumed ownership, taking it from Continental Development Corp.

The renovation will be designed by the architecture company Gensler. The district plans to retain about 66% of the existing building and remove the rest of it. The district plans to use four floors, with each floor the equivalent of one and one half soccer fields. The district plans to establish an atrium inside the building. The Wiseburn School District plans call for building an auditorium and a gymnasium separate from the existing structure. The district offices will also be moving from their current location to offices on the first floor of the new building The 2010 school bond will provide the funding for the construction.

Robert Kuznia of the Daily Breeze wrote that the district selected the site because of the proximity to the aerospace companies and because of the room allowed for parking and athletic fields.

The district plans to move its charter high schools to the Wiseburn High School campus when it opens. The district offices will also be moving from their current location to offices on the first floor of the new building.

== Community relations ==
As of 2014 many aerospace engineers volunteer as tutors at Wiseburn schools.

== See also ==
- Non-high school district
