= Alondra Park, California =

Alondra Park
- Unincorporated community Census designated place
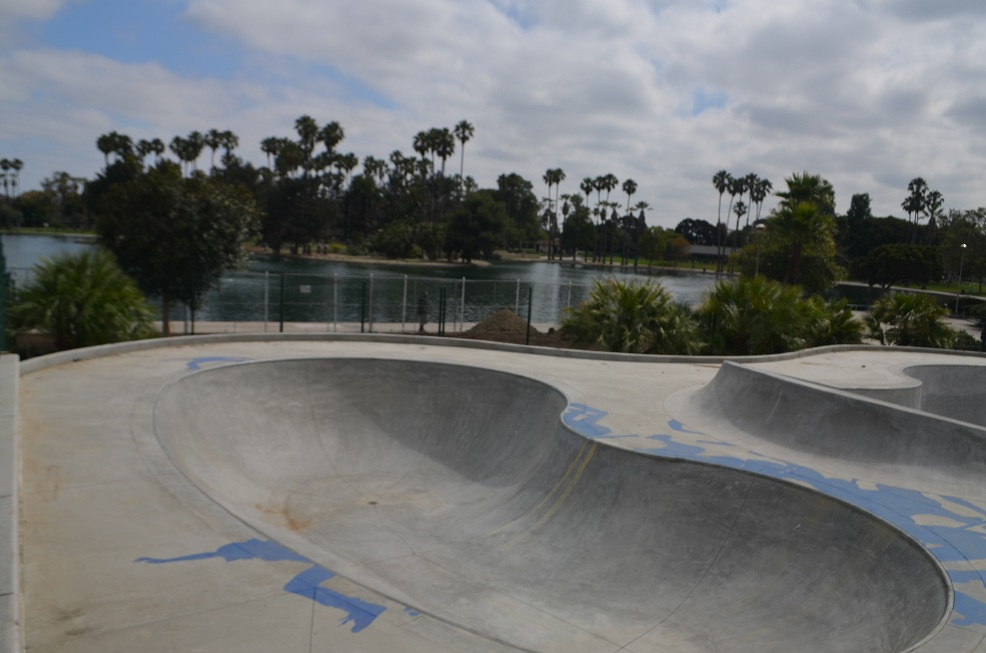
- Alondra Skate Park opening in 2012.

- Location of Alondra Park in Los Angeles County, California.

- Location in the United States Alondra Park (California) Alondra Park (the United States)
- Coordinates: 33°53′27″N 118°20′3″W
- Country: United States
- State: California
- County: Los Angeles

Area
  - Total: 1.14 sq mi (2.96 km^{2})
  - Land: 1.10 sq mi (2.86 km^{2})
  - Water: 0.035 sq mi (0.09 km^{2}) 3.17%
- Elevation: 52 ft (16 m)

Population (2020)
  - Total: 8,569
  - Density: 7,756.4/sq mi (2,994.78/km^{2})
- Time zone: UTC-8 (Pacific)
  - Summer (DST): UTC-7 (PDT)
- ZIP code: 90249
- Area code: 310
- FIPS code: 06-01150
- GNIS feature IDs: 1866995, 2407724

Alondra Park, also known as El Camino Village, is an unincorporated community and census designated place (CDP) in the South Bay region of Los Angeles County, California, United States. It is the unincorporated area north of Alondra Community Regional Park and El Camino College. It is east of Lawndale, south of Hawthorne, west of Gardena, and north of Torrance. Manhattan Beach Boulevard and Crenshaw Boulevard are the two major cross streets in the area. The population was 8,569 at the 2020 census, down from 8,592 at the 2010 census. There is an official Alondra Park Post Office of the U.S. Postal Service in nearby Gardena, California. Urbanized cement-lined Dominguez Creek bisects a portion of Alondra Park.

== Geography ==
Alondra Park is located about two miles (3 km) southeast of Hawthorne.

According to the United States Census Bureau, the CDP has a total area of 1.1 square miles (2.8 km^{2}), of which 1.1 square miles (2.8 km^{2}) is land and 0.04 square miles (0.10 km^{2}) (3.17%) is water.

== Demographics ==
Historical population
Census	Pop.	Note	%±
1970	12,193		—
1980	12,096		−0.8%
1990	12,215		1.0%
2000	8,622		−29.4%
2010	8,592		−0.3%
2020	8,569		−0.3%
U.S. Decennial Census; 1860–1870 1880-1890; 1900 1910 1920; 1930 1940 1950; 1960 1970 1980; 1990 2000 2010; 2020

Alondra Park first appeared as an unincorporated place in the 1970 U.S. census as part of the Inglewood census county division; and as a census designated place in the 1980 United States census.

=== Racial and ethnic composition ===
Alondra Park CDP, California – Racial and ethnic composition Note: the US Census treats Hispanic/Latino as an ethnic category. This table excludes Latinos from the racial categories and assigns them to a separate category. Hispanics/Latinos may be of any race.
Race / Ethnicity (NH = Non-Hispanic)	Pop 1980	Pop 1990	Pop 2000	Pop 2010	Pop 2020	% 1980	% 1990	% 2000	% 2010	% 2020
White alone (NH)	7,365	5,505	2,269	1,869	1,572	60.89%	45.07%	26.32%	21.75%	18.35%
Black or African American alone (NH)	629	1,106	1,060	787	926	5.20%	9.05%	12.29%	9.16%	10.81%
Native American or Alaska Native alone (NH)	68	65	30	14	21	0.56%	0.53%	0.35%	0.16%	0.25%
Asian alone (NH)	1,211	2,235	1,395	1,348	1,410	10.01%	18.30%	16.18%	15.69%	16.45%
Native Hawaiian or Pacific Islander alone (NH)	1,211	2,235	31	46	24	10.01%	18.30%	0.36%	0.54%	0.28%
Other race alone (NH)	9	32	17	22	80	0.07%	0.26%	0.20%	0.26%	0.93%
Mixed race or Multiracial (NH)	x	x	294	202	332	x	x	3.41%	2.35%	3.87%
Hispanic or Latino (any race)	2,814	3,362	3,526	4,304	4,204	23.26%	27.52%	40.90%	50.09%	49.06%
Total	12,096	12,215	8,622	8,592	8,569	100.00%	100.00%	100.00%	100.00%	100.00%

=== 2020 census ===
As of the 2020 census, Alondra Park had a population of 8,569. The population density was 7,754.8 inhabitants per square mile (2,994.1/km^{2}).

The census reported that 99.5% of the population lived in households, 0.3% lived in non-institutionalized group quarters, and 0.2% were institutionalized. 100.0% of residents lived in urban areas, while 0.0% lived in rural areas.

There were 2,829 households, of which 36.7% had children under the age of 18 living in them. Of all households, 45.1% were married-couple households, 7.6% were cohabiting couple households, 19.7% were households with a male householder and no spouse or partner present, and 27.6% were households with a female householder and no spouse or partner present. About 21.2% of all households were made up of individuals and 6.9% had someone living alone who was 65 years of age or older. The average household size was 3.01. There were 2,030 families (71.8% of all households).

The age distribution was 23.4% under the age of 18, 9.6% aged 18 to 24, 28.8% aged 25 to 44, 25.7% aged 45 to 64, and 12.5% who were 65 years of age or older. The median age was 36.9 years. For every 100 females there were 94.8 males, and for every 100 females age 18 and over there were 92.4 males.

There were 2,921 housing units at an average density of 2,643.4 units per square mile (1,020.6 units/km^{2}), of which 2,829 (96.9%) were occupied. Of occupied units, 47.9% were owner-occupied and 52.1% were occupied by renters. Of all housing units, 3.1% were vacant; the homeowner vacancy rate was 0.8% and the rental vacancy rate was 2.4%.

=== Income and poverty ===
In 2023, the US Census Bureau estimated that the median household income was $86,064, and the per capita income was $35,909. About 6.8% of families and 10.0% of the population were below the poverty line.

=== 2010 census ===
The 2010 United States census reported that Alondra Park had a population of 8,592. The population density was 7,518.4 inhabitants per square mile (2,902.9/km^{2}). The racial makeup of Alondra Park was 3,716 (43.2%) White (21.8% Non-Hispanic White), 806 (9.4%) African American, 32 (0.4%) Native American, 1,396 (16.2%) Asian, 48 (0.6%) Pacific Islander, 2,167 (25.2%) from other races, and 427 (5.0%) from two or more races. Hispanic or Latino of any race were 4,304 persons (50.1%).

The Census reported that 8,527 people (99.2% of the population) lived in households, 59 (0.7%) lived in non-institutionalized group quarters, and 6 (0.1%) were institutionalized.

There were 2,719 households, out of which 1,198 (44.1%) had children under the age of 18 living in them, 1,383 (50.9%) were opposite-sex married couples living together, 442 (16.3%) had a female householder with no husband present, 223 (8.2%) had a male householder with no wife present. There were 174 (6.4%) unmarried opposite-sex partnerships, and 17 (0.6%) same-sex married couples or partnerships. 513 households (18.9%) were made up of individuals, and 132 (4.9%) had someone living alone who was 65 years of age or older. The average household size was 3.14. There were 2,048 families (75.3% of all households); the average family size was 3.56.

The population was spread out, with 2,332 people (27.1%) under the age of 18, 818 people (9.5%) aged 18 to 24, 2,581 people (30.0%) aged 25 to 44, 2,091 people (24.3%) aged 45 to 64, and 770 people (9.0%) who were 65 years of age or older. The median age was 33.7 years. For every 100 females, there were 97.7 males. For every 100 females age 18 and over, there were 95.4 males.

There were 2,818 housing units at an average density of 2,465.9 per square mile (952.1/km^{2}), of which 1,362 (50.1%) were owner-occupied, and 1,357 (49.9%) were occupied by renters. The homeowner vacancy rate was 0.7%; the rental vacancy rate was 4.1%. 4,188 people (48.7% of the population) lived in owner-occupied housing units and 4,339 people (50.5%) lived in rental housing units.

According to the 2010 United States Census, Alondra Park had a median household income of $54,484, with 20.7% of the population living below the federal poverty line.

== Infrastructure ==
The Los Angeles County Sheriff's Department (LASD) operates the Lennox Station in Lennox, serving El Camino Village (Alondra Park).

== Government ==
In the California State Legislature, Alondra Park is in the 24th senatorial district, represented by Democrat Ben Allen, and in the 66th Assembly district, represented by Democrat Al Muratsuchi.

In the United States House of Representatives, Alondra Park is in California's 43rd congressional district, represented by Democrat Maxine Waters.

== Education ==
=== Primary and secondary schools ===
Alondra Park is served by the Lawndale Elementary School District. Three elementary schools, Kit Carson Elementary School (Preschool), Franklin D. Roosevelt Elementary School (grades TK-5), and Mark Twain Elementary School (PK-5), are located inside and serve portions of Alondra Park. Residents are zoned to Rogers Middle School in Lawndale. For high school residents are in the Centinela Valley Union High School District.

=== Colleges and universities ===
El Camino College is partially inside Alondra Park, while the remainder is in Torrance.

=== Public libraries ===
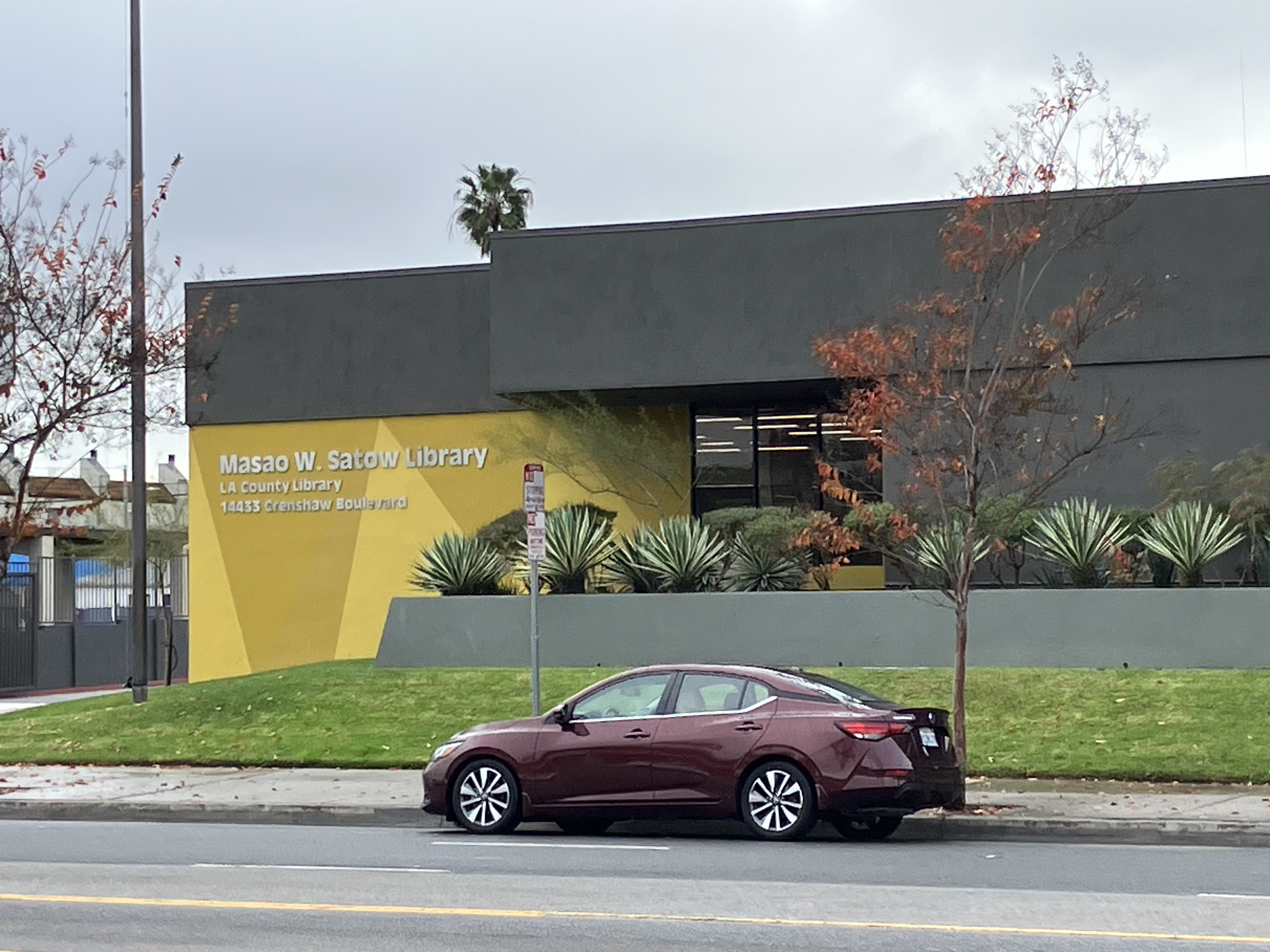
Masao W. Satow Library

County of Los Angeles Library operates the Masao W. Satow Library, located in Alondra Park.

In 1913 the Moneta Branch was formed. In 1919 the Strawberry Park branch was formed. In 1958 the Strawberry Park and Moneta branches merged into the West Gardena Branch. In 1969 a fire forced the West Gardena branch to go to a new location. The current Satow building, dedicated on February 26, 1977, was named after a Japanese American in the community.
