= South Bay (Los Angeles County) =

- Region
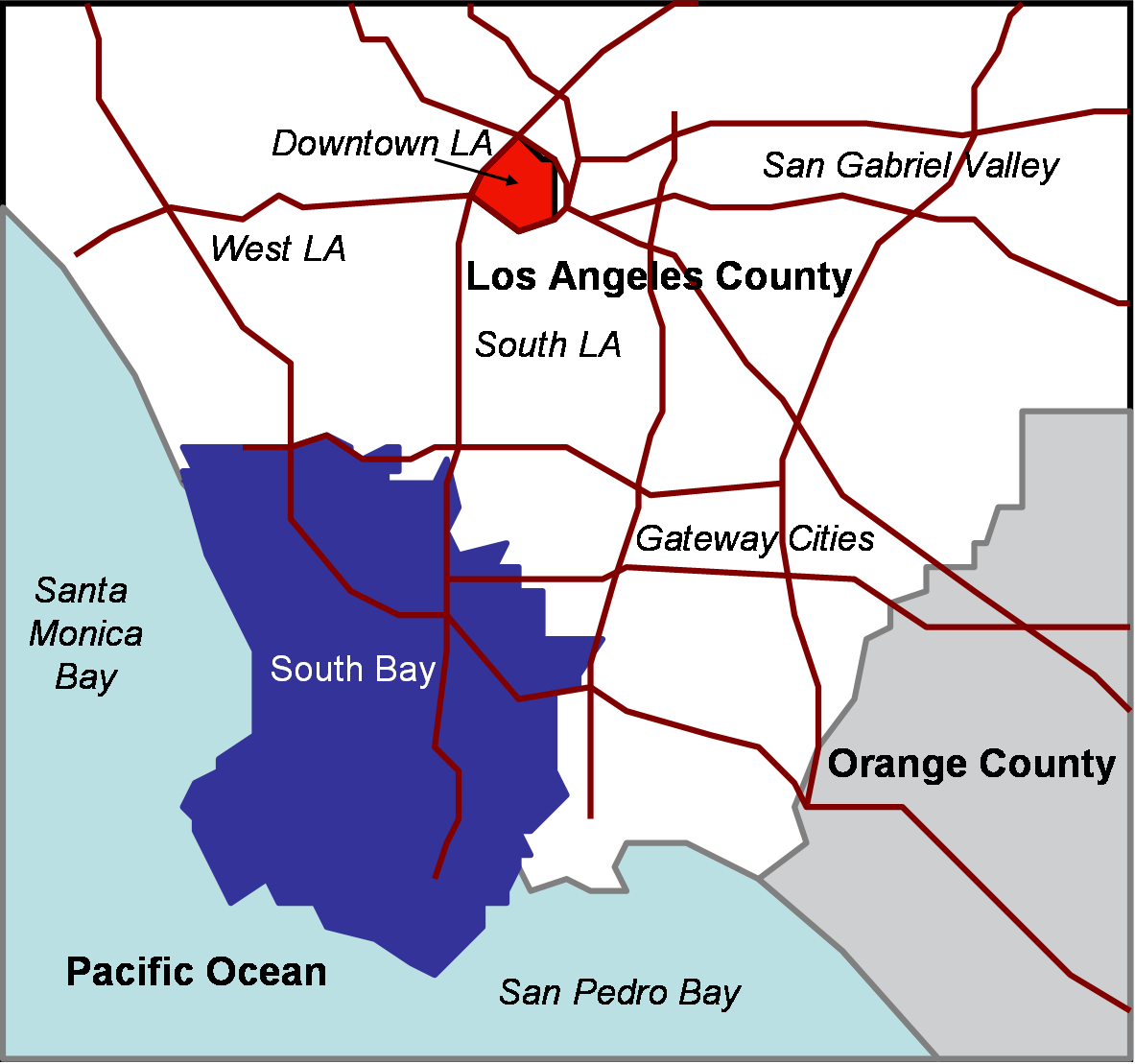
- The South Bay and surrounding regions in Southern California
- Interactive map of South Bay
- Coordinates: 33°50′13″N 118°19′05″W
- Country: United States
- State: California
- County: Los Angeles

The South Bay is a region of Greater Los Angeles, California, United States. Located in the southwest corner of Los Angeles County, the name stems from its geographic location stretching along the southern shore of Santa Monica Bay. The South Bay contains sixteen cities plus portions of the City of Los Angeles and unincorporated portions of the county. The area is bounded by the Pacific Ocean on the south and west and generally by the City of Los Angeles on the north and east.

== Neighborhoods ==
The South Bay includes:

- The Beach Cities
  - Hermosa Beach
  - Manhattan Beach
  - Redondo Beach
- The Palos Verdes Peninsula cities
  - Palos Verdes Estates
  - Rancho Palos Verdes
  - Rolling Hills
  - Rolling Hills Estates
- Other coastal cities
  - El Segundo
  - Torrance
- Inland cities of the South Bay
  - Carson
  - Gardena
  - Hawthorne
  - Inglewood
  - Lawndale
  - Lomita
- Neighborhoods of the City of Los Angeles
  - Harbor City
  - San Pedro
  - Westchester
  - Wilmington
- Unincorporated areas of the County of Los Angeles, including:
  - Alondra Park/El Camino Village
  - Del Aire
  - Harbor Gateway
  - Lennox
  - West Carson
  - Westfield/Academy Hills

The region is bordered on the north by the Westside region of Los Angeles, on the northeast by the South Los Angeles region and on the east and southeast by the Gateway Cities.

== South Bay Cities Council of Governments ==
The South Bay Cities Council of Governments (SBCCOG) is a joint powers authority government agency made of politicians from the sixteen South Bay cities and unincorporated Los Angeles County that share the goal of maximizing the quality of life and productivity of the South Bay region of Los Angeles. The SBCCOG members are Carson, El Segundo, Gardena, Hawthorne, Hermosa Beach, Inglewood, Lawndale, Lomita, Manhattan Beach, Palos Verdes Estates, Rancho Palos Verdes, Redondo Beach, Rolling Hills, Rolling Hills Estates, Torrance, the Harbor City/San Pedro/Wilmington communities of the City of Los Angeles and the unincorporated areas of the County of Los Angeles Districts 2 and 4.

== Major employers ==
=== Port of Los Angeles ===
The Port of Los Angeles, sprawling across the shorelines of San Pedro and Wilmington, is the busiest in the United States. When combined with the Port of Long Beach, it is the fifth-busiest in the world. Traditionally, most of the populations of Wilmington and San Pedro have worked for the port in some capacity. It is increasingly the primary driver of the Southern California economy. Industrial growth in the Inland Empire is almost entirely attributable to increased port traffic since the 1980s. The massive increase in cargo volume has created significant air pollution (especially of particulate matter in neighboring communities, resulting from the combustion of low-grade marine diesel fuel).

=== Aerospace ===
The South Bay is the traditional home of Southern California's aerospace industry. While considerably shrunken from its Cold War peak, it still represents a major economic force, employing thousands in high-skill, high-wage engineering positions and generating enormous amounts of tax revenue. Northrop Grumman has a major facility in El Segundo where the F/A-18 Hornet fuselage is manufactured, as well as the headquarters of the Space Technology division in Redondo Beach and a facility at the Hawthorne Municipal Airport. Howmet Fastening Systems, a subsidiary of Howmet Aerospace, has their corporate headquarters located in Torrance with manufacturing facilities in both Torrance and Carson. Boeing and Lockheed Martin also maintain extensive production facilities throughout the South Bay and Raytheon maintains a facility in El Segundo. The Los Angeles Air Force Base and neighboring Aerospace Corporation in El Segundo are a main focus of aerospace research activity and serve as the primary development facilities for military satellites and other space programs. DirecTV, a former subsidiary of Hughes Aircraft, is also headquartered in El Segundo for the same reason. SpaceX is also headquartered in the South Bay in Hawthorne.

=== Oil refining ===
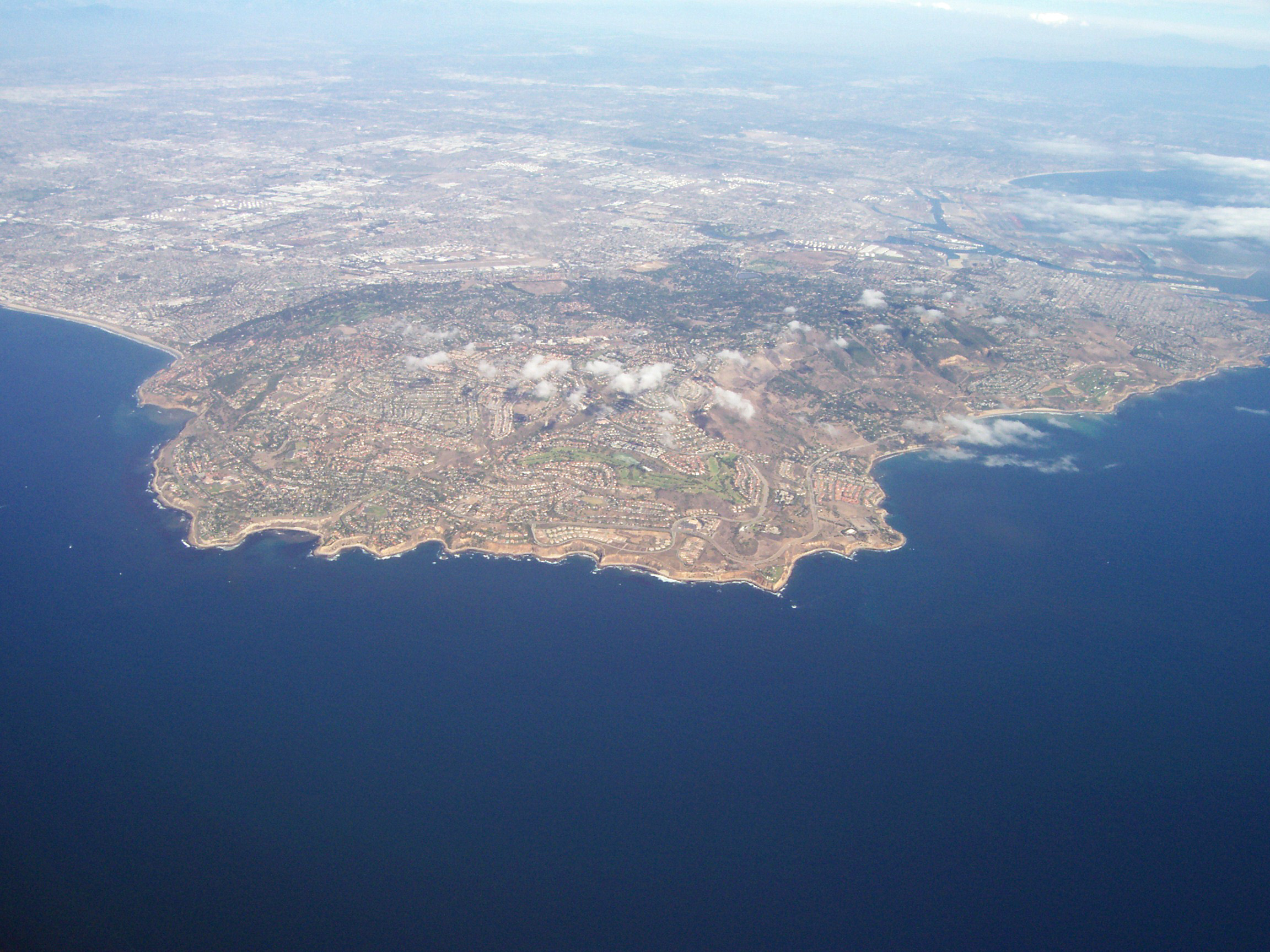
View of the Palos Verdes Peninsula. Los Angeles in the distance.

Petroleum refining is another important component of the South Bay's economy. Major South Bay refiners include Tesoro (ARCO facility in Carson), Chevron (El Segundo), Phillips 66 (Wilmington), PBF Energy (Torrance), Tesoro (Wilmington), and Valero (Wilmington). These refiners supply a large share of petroleum products for Southern California as well as for Nevada and Arizona.

=== Automotive ===
Japanese automobile manufacturer Honda maintains its North American headquarters in the South Bay, in the city of Torrance. (Nissan was also headquartered in the South Bay until late 2005, but relocated to Tennessee, citing the high cost of running a business in California. Toyota relocated to Plano, Texas in 2017 for many of the same reasons.) While these locations are largely the legacy of the region's historical importance as a Japanese-American population center, it has proven fortunate for two reasons; first, it enables closer oversight of vehicle import operations at the nearby ports; and second, it gives them proximity to the automobile customization culture that is prominent in nearby South Los Angeles. Tesla is stationed near the headquarters of SpaceX in Hawthorne.

== Higher education ==
- Loyola Marymount University
- California State University, Dominguez Hills
- El Camino College
- Los Angeles Harbor College
- UCLA South Bay
- Southern California Regional Occupational Center
- University of West Los Angeles
- Otis College of Art and Design

== Transportation ==
The Harbor (I-110), San Diego (I-405), Gardena (SR 91), and Century (I-105) Freeways provide the region with its principal transportation links.

The Los Angeles Metro's A Line (opened in 1990 as the Blue Line) is a light rail line running between Downtown Los Angeles and Downtown Long Beach. It was the first of Metro's modern rail lines since the 1961 demise of the Pacific Electric Railway's Red Car system. The C Line (opened in 1995 as the Green Line, together with the Glenn Anderson Freeway), a freeway-median light rail line, also serves the South Bay. It runs between Redondo Beach and Norwalk in the median of the Century Freeway (Interstate 105), providing indirect access to LAX via a shuttle bus and future automated people mover. The K Line opened from Expo/Crenshaw station to Westchester/Veterans station, and became fully operational to Redondo Beach station, via LAX, in 2025.

Several ports and harbors in the South Bay provide access to Santa Catalina Island, a popular resort. In addition, LAX borders El Segundo to the north in the neighborhood of Westchester, Los Angeles. The area is also home to two public airports; Zamperini Field in Torrance and Hawthorne Municipal Airport in Hawthorne.

== Media ==
In addition to the Los Angeles Times, the South Bay cities are served by daily papers, the Daily Breeze, the weeklies The Beach Reporter, The Easy Reader and South Bay Community News, a bi-monthly real estate magazine, South Bay DIGS and lifestyle publication 'Southbay Magazine'. The National Football League has its West Coast headquarters and production facility for NFL Network, NFL RedZone and the NFL.com app in Inglewood.

== Music ==
The South Bay has a rich history in music, and has produced a number of significant rock bands, like Hawthorne natives The Beach Boys in the early 1960s, and continuing particularly in punk music. Other notable South Bay-based artists include:

- 98 Mute (Hermosa Beach)
- 3rd Strike (San Pedro)
- Ab-Soul (Carson)
- Ambrosia (Torrance)
- Ash Riser (Redondo Beach)
- Big Syke (Inglewood)
- Bishop Lamont (Carson)
- Black Flag (Hermosa Beach)
- Blu (San Pedro)
- Boo-Yaa T.R.I.B.E. (Carson)
- Brandy (Carson)
- Brenton Wood (San Pedro)
- By All Means (Torrance)
- Cali Swag District (Inglewood)
- Circle Jerks (Hermosa Beach)
- Cuco (Hawthorne)
- Custom Made (Hawthorne, Inglewood, Redondo Beach)
- Darlene Love (Hawthorne)
- David Benoit (Manhattan Beach)
- Descendents (Manhattan Beach)
- Fortunate Youth (Hermosa Beach)
- James Newton Howard (Torrance)
- Omarion (Inglewood)
- Ras Kass (Carson)
- KeyKool (Torrance)
- Kurupt (Hawthorne)
- Left Alone (Wilmington)
- Joyce Manor (Torrance)
- Mack 10 (Inglewood)
- Miguel (San Pedro)
- Minutemen (San Pedro)
- Pennywise (Hermosa Beach)
- Pigeon John (Hawthorne)
- Ray-J (Carson)
- Redd Kross (Hawthorne)
- Rotting Out (San Pedro)
- Seahaven (Torrance)
- Shannon Lay (Redondo Beach)
- Slip Capone (Hawthorne)
- Smut Peddlers (Redondo Beach)
- Sonny Bono (Inglewood)
- The Thirsty Crows (Redondo Beach)
- Tim Bluhm (Manhattan Beach)
- Tokimonsta (Torrance)
- Tom Smothers (Redondo Beach)
- Tyga (Gardena)
- Tyler The Creator (Hawthorne)
- The Last (Hermosa Beach)

Black Flag guitarist Greg Brenton Ginn's SST record label, a seminal alternative rock label of the 1980s, maintained its headquarters in Lawndale.

== Sports and entertainment ==
The South Bay is host to many professional sports teams and entertainment venues. The Los Angeles Rams and Los Angeles Chargers of the National Football League play at SoFi Stadium in Inglewood. The Los Angeles Clippers of the National Basketball Association play at Intuit Dome, which is also in Inglewood, while the LA Galaxy of Major League Soccer play their home games at Dignity Health Sports Park in Carson.

Various entertainment venues are located in the South Bay, including SoFi Stadium, Kia Forum, Intuit Dome, and YouTube Theater in Inglewood, Dignity Health Sports Park in Carson, and Toyota Sports Center in El Segundo. Three casinos also operate in the South Bay; the Hollywood Park Casino in Inglewood and the Normandie Casino and Hustler Casino in Gardena.

== See also ==
- South Bay (Bay Area)
- Juan Maria Sepulveda, former owner of this area

Other regions of Los Angeles County

- Angeles National Forest
- Antelope Valley
- Eastside
- Harbor
- Northeast Los Angeles
- Northwest County
- Pomona Valley
- San Fernando Valley
- San Gabriel Valley
- South Bay
- Santa Monica Mountains
- South Los Angeles
- Southeast County
- Verdugos
- Westside
