= El Segundo Unified School District =

School district in El Segundo, California, United States

Address
- 641 Sheldon Street El Segundo, California, 90245; United States

District information
- Type: Public
- Grades: K–12
- NCES District ID: 0612210

Students and staff
- Students: 3,448
- Teachers: 141.78 (FTE)
- Staff: 109.5 (FTE)
- Student–teacher ratio: 24.32

Other information
- Website: www.elsegundousd.net

El Segundo Unified School District is a school district headquartered in El Segundo, California, United States. The district serves all residents living in El Segundo and covers the western part of the city; the portion of the Wiseburn School District in El Segundo has businesses but no residents.

== History ==
In 1912 the El Segundo School District opened, taking territory from the Wiseburn School District. At that time the area was within the Inglewood Union High School District, now known as the Centinela Valley Union High School District. On November 22, 1925, the El Segundo High School District was formed and El Segundo withdrew from the Inglewood Union district. In 1979, El Segundo Junior High School was closed due to low enrollment and the National Football League Los Angeles Raiders occupied the building, using it as their headquarters from 1982 until 1996. With climbing enrollment, the now renamed El Segundo Middle School was re-opened in 1999.

== Schools ==
El Segundo High School

=== Adult schools ===
- South Bay Adult School

=== Secondary schools ===
Zoned

- El Segundo High School
- El Segundo Middle School

Alternative

- Arena High School & the Virtual Academy
- Southern California Regional Occupational Center

=== Primary schools ===
Elementary schools

- Center Street School
- Richmond Street School

Preschool

- Eagle's Nest Preschool
