= Hawthorne School District =

School district in California

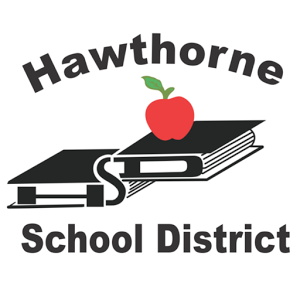

Address
- 14120 South Hawthorne Boulevard Hawthorne, California, 90250; United States

District information
- Type: Public
- Grades: K–12
- NCES District ID: 0616680

Students and staff
- Students: 7,581 (2020–2021)
- Teachers: 305.63 (FTE)
- Staff: 363.74 (FTE)
- Student–teacher ratio: 24.8:1

Other information
- Website: www.hawthornesd.org

Hawthorne School District is a school district headquartered in Hawthorne, California, United States.

The district serves much of Hawthorne.

== Zoned schools ==
=== Zoned middle schools ===
- Bud Carson Middle School
- Hawthorne Middle School
- Prairie Vista Middle School

=== Zoned elementary schools ===
- Zela Davis Elementary School
- Eucalyptus Elementary School
- Jefferson Elementary School
- Kornblum Elementary School
- Ramona Elementary School
- Washington Elementary School
- York Elementary School

== Associated high schools ==
Hawthorne Math and Science Academy is a charter high school in Hawthorne associated with the Hawthorne School District.
