= Lawndale, California =

City in California, United States

- City
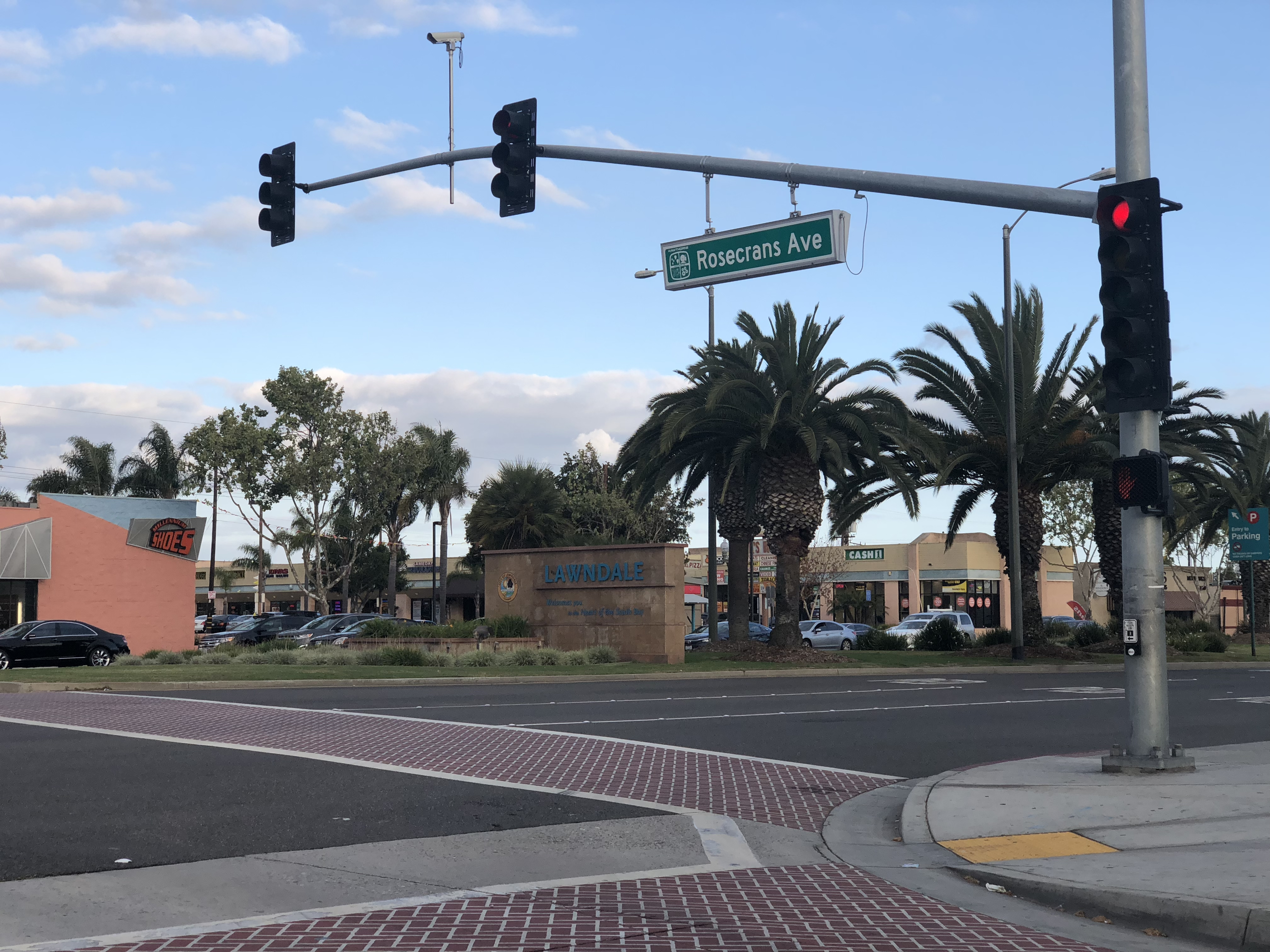
- Intersection of Rosecrans Ave. and Hawthorne Blvd.

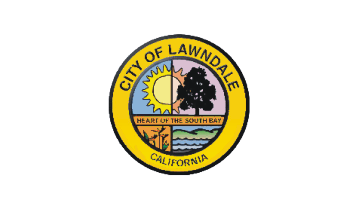
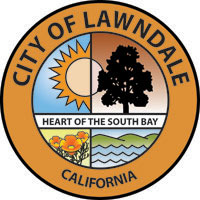
- Flag Seal
- Motto: "Heart of the South Bay"
- Interactive map of Lawndale, California
- Location in the United States
- Coordinates: 33°53′12″N 118°21′13″W
- Country: United States
- State: California
- County: Los Angeles
- Incorporated: December 28, 1959

Government
  - Mayor: Robert Pullen-Miles
  - Mayor Pro Tem: Pat Kearney
  - City Council: Bernadette Suarez; Sirley Cuevas; Frank M. Talavera
  - City manager: Sean M. Moore

Area
  - Total: 1.97 sq mi (5.11 km^{2})
  - Land: 1.97 sq mi (5.11 km^{2})
  - Water: 0 sq mi (0.00 km^{2}) 0%
- Elevation: 59 ft (18 m)

Population (2020)
  - Total: 31,807
  - Density: 16,406.5/sq mi (6,334.58/km^{2})
- Time zone: UTC-8 (PST)
  - Summer (DST): UTC-7 (PDT)
- ZIP codes: 90260, 90261
- Area code: 310/424
- FIPS code: 06-40886
- GNIS feature IDs: 1652742. 2411637
- Website: www.lawndale.ca.gov

Lawndale is a city in Los Angeles County, California, United States. The population was 31,807 at the 2020 census, down from 32,769 at the 2010 census. The city is in the South Bay region of the Greater Los Angeles Area.

== History ==
Native Americans of the Tongva tribe lived in the area.

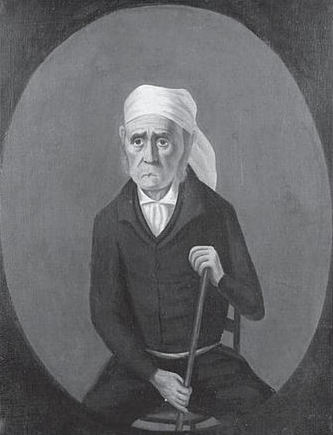
Lawndale was originally part of Rancho Sausal Redondo, granted in 1837 to Antonio Ygnacio Ávila, of the prominent Ávila family of California.

From the 1780s onward, the area that is now Lawndale was part of the Rancho Sausal Redondo, a land grant given by the Spanish colonial government that includes much of what is now the South Bayshore region. In 1905, Charles B. Hopper first subdivided the area and named it after the Chicago neighborhood of the same name. Lots sold slowly and different promotions were tried, such as promoting Lawndale as a chicken raising area. The first railway to run through Lawndale was the Inglewood Division of the Redondo Railway which would later become part of the Pacific Electric "Red Car" system. It ran down the middle of Railway Avenue (now Hawthorne Boulevard) until 1933. In 1927, the Santa Fe railroad arrived. After World War II, the immense demand for housing from returning veterans and California newcomers resulted in Lawndale's formation as a bedroom community. On December 28, 1959, it was incorporated as a city.

Starting in the 1970s, Lawndale's relatively low housing prices but more desirable location relative to its neighboring cities attracted absentee landlords and a substantial portion of its residents increasingly became renters.

For a time in the 1980s, with a new cycle of expansion of the defense industry nearby, many young people who wished to live in the Beach Cities found that they simply could not afford to do so, and settled in less glamorous inland cities such as Lawndale. But with the contraction of this industry after the Cold War, Lawndale reverted to its previous pattern. It has attempted to attract more owner–residents, as well as tourists, with the 2003 completion of the "Beautify Lawndale" urban renewal project along the city's stretch of Hawthorne Boulevard (State Route 107), a major South Bay thoroughfare.

A large electronic billboard was installed and began running advertising in 2004 until it was realized that the sign violated a city ordinance prohibiting advertising of out-of-town businesses on signs of that nature. For its first 18 months, the sign was sponsored by Fox and promoted upcoming television shows and movies under the Fox label. It later gained and lost a sponsorship with Acura before its current sponsorship for Los Angeles radio station 100.3 – The Sound. The billboard is said to generate Lawndale $200,000 annually. In 2012, the Lawndale community center opened its doors.

== Economy ==
=== Top employers ===
According to the city's 2022 Comprehensive Annual Financial Report, the top employers in the city are:

#	Employer	# of Employees
1	Lawndale Elementary School District	779
2	Centinela Valley Union High School District	525
3	Target	78
4	VCA Advanced Veterinary Care Center	75
5	El Super Grocery Store	72
6	McDonald's	70
7	City of Lawndale	65
8	Options for Life, Inc.	50
9	Smart & Final	42
10	American Drilling Co	40

== Media ==
Lawndale Community Cable Television on Channel 22 is a Public-access television cable TV station. The City of Lawndale's Cable Television Department is funded by the Lawndale Cable Usage Corporation and the City of Lawndale through Local Access Fees and Cable television franchise fee provided by the local cable company, Time Warner Cable. The Lawndale Cable Usage Corporation is the non-profit, California corporation that receives these fees, and provides for the development of Lawndale Community Cable Television.

The Lawndalian a citywide newsletter that informs the residents about programs and events happening in the City of Lawndale. The Lawndalian is now available Online at the city's website.

The Lawndale Tribune is the community paper for the City of Lawndale.

== Government ==
=== Municipal government ===
Harold Hofmann served as mayor for 23 years, due to there not being city term limits and running unopposed in most elections.

=== State and federal representation ===
In the California State Legislature, Lawndale is in the 35th senatorial district, represented by Democrat Laura Richardson, and in the 61st Assembly district, represented by Democrat Tina McKinnor.

In the United States House of Representatives, Lawndale is in California's 43rd congressional district, which has a Cook PVI of D +26 and is represented by Democrat Maxine Waters.

== Infrastructure ==
The Los Angeles County Sheriff's Department (LASD) operates the Lennox Station in Lennox, serving Lawndale. In addition the agency operates the City of Lawndale Sheriff's Department Service Center.

The United States Postal Service Lawndale Post Office is located at 4320 Marine Avenue.

The Los Angeles County Department of Health Services operates the Curtis Tucker Health Center in Inglewood, serving Lawndale.

The County of Los Angeles Public Library Lawndale Library is located 14615 Burin Ave.

== Education ==
Lawndale Elementary School District

- Will Rogers Middle School serving 6th, 7th and 8th grades
- Jane Addams Middle School serving 6th, 7th, and 8th grades.
- F.D.R. Elementary School
- William Anderson Elementary School
- William Green Elementary School
- Mark Twain Elementary School
- Billy Mitchell Elementary School
- Lucille J. Smith Elementary School
  - The elementary school was nominated for National Blue Ribbon School award for reducing the achievement gap on state standardized test scores. This is one of the highest recognition a school can earn from the federal government. It is the first school in the Lawndale elementary School District to be nominated for the award. In August, 2025, the second Trump administration terminated this award program, and no winners were announced. The elementary school hosted a local celebration anyway.

Centinela Valley Union High School District

- Lawndale High School
- Leuzinger High School
- Hawthorne High School
- Lloyde High School

Environmental Charter High School is a charter school in Lawndale serving grades 9 through 12.

In 2009, the renovated Lawndale Public Library of the County of Los Angeles Public Library, which is located adjacent to the Lawndale City Hall, re-opened.

== Geography ==
According to the United States Census Bureau, the city has a total area of 2.0 square miles (5.1 km^{2}), all land.

Lawndale is bordered by Redondo Beach on the west and southwest, Hawthorne on the north, Torrance on the southeast, and the unincorporated area of El Camino Village (also known as Alondra Park) on the east.

Lawndale is serviced by Interstate 405, Hawthorne Boulevard (State Route 107), and by Artesia Boulevard (State Route 91), which becomes a freeway farther east. Lawndale is 5.7 miles southeast of Los Angeles International Airport.

Lawndale is serviced by following public transit: the Lawndale Beat, the Gardena Bus 1, Metro Green Line and by Metro buses 211, 40 and 740, the latter two of which are operated by the Los Angeles County Metropolitan Transportation Authority.

The weather is warm all year long. In the winter, there are moderate rains. Because of the formation of the Palos Verdes Peninsula and its proximity to the beach, the city gets effects of the marine layer on almost identical, if not slightly lower, levels of nearby beach cities such as Manhattan Beach and El Segundo.

== Demographics ==
Historical population
Census	Pop.	Note	%±
1960	21,740		—
1970	24,825		14.2%
1980	23,460		−5.5%
1990	27,331		16.5%
2000	31,711		16.0%
2010	32,769		3.3%
2020	31,807		−2.9%
U.S. Decennial Census; 1860–1870 1880-1890; 1900 1910 1920; 1930 1940 1950; 1960 1970 1980; 1990 2000 2010; 2020

Lawndale first appeared as a city in the 1960 U.S. census as part of the Inglewood census county division.

=== Racial and ethnic composition ===
Lawndale city, California – Racial and ethnic composition Note: the US Census treats Hispanic/Latino as an ethnic category. This table excludes Latinos from the racial categories and assigns them to a separate category. Hispanics/Latinos may be of any race.
Race / Ethnicity (NH = Non-Hispanic)	Pop 1980	Pop 1990	Pop 2000	Pop 2010	Pop 2020	% 1980	% 1990	% 2000	% 2010	% 2020
White alone (NH)	14,201	12,593	6,946	5,311	4,549	60.53%	46.08%	21.90%	16.21%	14.30%
Black or African American alone (NH)	652	2,077	3,852	3,054	2,538	2.78%	7.60%	12.15%	9.32%	7.98%
Native American or Alaska Native alone (NH)	265	154	111	95	75	1.13%	0.56%	0.35%	0.29%	0.24%
Asian alone (NH)	1,540	3,054	2,991	3,142	3,208	6.56%	11.17%	9.43%	9.59%	10.09%
Native Hawaiian or Pacific Islander alone (NH)	1,540	3,054	256	343	185	6.56%	11.17%	0.81%	1.05%	0.58%
Other race alone (NH)	124	94	84	139	248	0.53%	0.34%	0.26%	0.42%	0.78%
Mixed race or Multiracial (NH)	x	x	956	683	986	x	x	3.01%	2.08%	3.10%
Hispanic or Latino (any race)	6,678	9,359	16,515	20,002	20,018	28.47%	34.24%	52.08%	61.04%	62.94%
Total	23,460	27,331	31,711	32,769	31,807	100.00%	100.00%	100.00%	100.00%	100.00%

=== 2020 census ===
As of the 2020 census, Lawndale had a population of 31,807 and a population density of 16,129.3 inhabitants per square mile (6,227.6/km^{2}). The racial makeup was 21.2% White, 8.5% African American, 2.5% Native American, 10.4% Asian, 0.6% Pacific Islander, 39.3% from other races, and 17.5% from two or more races.

The census reported that 99.4% of the population lived in households, 0.6% lived in non-institutionalized group quarters, and no one was institutionalized. 100.0% of residents lived in urban areas, while 0.0% lived in rural areas.

There were 9,973 households, of which 40.0% had children under the age of 18 living in them. Of all households, 42.5% were married-couple households, 8.2% were cohabiting couple households, 28.4% had a female householder with no partner present, and 20.8% had a male householder with no partner present. About 18.8% of households were one person, and 5.8% had someone living alone who was 65 years of age or older. The average household size was 3.17, and there were 7,242 families (72.6% of all households).

The age distribution was 22.3% under the age of 18, 10.1% aged 18 to 24, 31.3% aged 25 to 44, 26.0% aged 45 to 64, and 10.3% who were 65 years of age or older. The median age was 35.5 years. For every 100 females, there were 98.2 males, and for every 100 females age 18 and over there were 97.0 males age 18 and over.

There were 10,286 housing units at an average density of 5,216.0 units per square mile (2,013.9 units/km^{2}), of which 9,973 (97.0%) were occupied. Of these, 33.4% were owner-occupied, and 66.6% were occupied by renters. The homeowner vacancy rate was 0.6%, and the rental vacancy rate was 2.1%.

=== 2023 ACS estimates ===
In 2023, the US Census Bureau estimated that the median household income was $83,538, and the per capita income was $32,199. About 8.7% of families and 12.3% of the population were below the poverty line.

=== 2010 census ===
At the 2010 census Lawndale had a population of 32,769. The population density was 16,599.0 inhabitants per square mile (6,408.9/km^{2}). The racial makeup of Lawndale was 14,274 (43.6%) White (16.2% Non-Hispanic White), 3,320 (10.1%) African American, 301 (0.9%) Native American, 3,269 (10.0%) Asian, 367 (1.1%) Pacific Islander, 9,374 (28.6%) from other races, and 1,864 (5.7%) from two or more races. Hispanic or Latino of any race were 20,002 persons (61.0%).

The census reported that 32,594 people (99.5% of the population) lived in households, 158 (0.5%) lived in non-institutionalized group quarters, and 17 (0.1%) were institutionalized.

There were 9,681 households, 4,516 (46.6%) had children under the age of 18 living in them, 4,467 (46.1%) were opposite-sex married couples living together, 1,813 (18.7%) had a female householder with no husband present, 881 (9.1%) had a male householder with no wife present. There were 722 (7.5%) unmarried opposite-sex partnerships, and 64 (0.7%) same-sex married couples or partnerships. 1,758 households (18.2%) were one person and 442 (4.6%) had someone living alone who was 65 or older. The average household size was 3.37. There were 7,161 families (74.0% of households); the average family size was 3.84.

The age distribution was 8,927 people (27.2%) under the age of 18, 3,744 people (11.4%) aged 18 to 24, 10,541 people (32.2%) aged 25 to 44, 7,301 people (22.3%) aged 45 to 64, and 2,256 people (6.9%) who were 65 or older. The median age was 31.9 years. For every 100 females, there were 101.3 males. For every 100 females age 18 and over, there were 100.6 males.

There were 10,151 housing units at an average density of 5,141.9 per square mile, of the occupied units 3,326 (34.4%) were owner-occupied and 6,355 (65.6%) were rented. The homeowner vacancy rate was 1.7%; the rental vacancy rate was 3.8%. 11,606 people (35.4% of the population) lived in owner-occupied housing units and 20,988 people (64.0%) lived in rental housing units.

According to the 2010 United States Census, Lawndale had a median household income of $47,769, with 16.7% of the population living below the federal poverty line.

=== 2000 census ===
Mapping L.A. reported that in 2000, Mexican (34.7%) and Vietnamese (4.2%) were the most common ancestries. Mexico (47.6%) and Vietnam (9.1%) were the most common foreign places of birth.

Since Lawndale has a large amount of elderly residents, the city provides free trips for seniors on its city bus: The Lawndale Beat. The city also provides a meals on wheels program as well as a seniors travel club.

== Notable people ==
- Fred Dryer, NFL player and actor; raised in Lawndale in the 1950s, Lawndale High School alumnus.
- Russell Westbrook, NBA player; attended high school in Lawndale (Leuzinger High School).
- Traci Lords, actress.
- Roy Rogers, famed actor and singer in Western-themed movies, radio programs and television shows.
- Tiran Porter, bass player for the Doobie Brothers and Moby Grape, was raised in Lawndale and attended Leuzinger High School.
- Jalon Daniels, professional NFL quarterback for the Tampa Bay Buccaneers.

== International relations ==
=== Sister cities ===
Cagayan de Oro, Philippines (1986)
