= Lawndale High School =

Location
- 14901 S. Inglewood Avenue; Lawndale, California 90260; United States; 33°53′45″N 118°21′46″W

Information
- Motto: There Are No Limits to Our Accomplishments
- Established: 1959
- Principal: Angelica Mejia
- Enrollment: 1,680 (2023-2024)
- Colors: Cardinal and white
- Athletics conference: CIF Southern Section; Pioneer League
- Nickname: Cardinals
- Website: www.lawndalehs.org

Lawndale High School is one of three high schools in Lawndale, California, United States. The school was closed in 1981, and reopened in 1998. It is one of three schools in the Centinela Valley Union High School District.

In 2009, Lawndale High was awarded the California Distinguished Award. The principal was then Vicente Bravo. During this time period, Lawndale was also awarded the US News Silver Medal for similar high schools throughout the nation. It was also a Title 1 Achievement school.

Lawndale High had an enrollment of 2,364 as of the 2013–14 school year.

== Notable alumni ==
- Gary Allenson - former MLB catcher and manager of the Norfolk Tides
- Mike Battle - Former NFL safety
- Jalon Daniels - NFL QB for the Tampa bay buccaneers.
- Fred Dryer - actor and former NFL defensive end
- Elijah Jackson - cornerback for the Washington Huskies
- Tracy Jones - MLB outfielder
- Ricardo Lemvo - leader of Makina Loca, a Soukous band in Congo
- Chimezie Metu - Forward for the Phoenix Suns.
- Tuli Tuipulotu - Linebacker for the Los Angeles Chargers
- Terry Vance - Pro racer
