= Daily Breeze =

Daily newspaper published in Hermosa Beach, California

- Type: Daily newspaper
- Format: Broadsheet
- Owner(s): Southern California News Group (MediaNews Group)
- Founder: S. D. Barkley
- Publisher: Ron Hasse
- Editor: Frank Pine
- Founded: 1894; 132 years ago
- Language: English
- Headquarters: 2615 Pacific Coast Hwy, Hermosa Beach, CA 90254 United States
- Circulation: 57,185 Daily; 67,970 Sunday (as of September 2014)
- OCLC number: 36312306
- Website: dailybreeze.com

The Daily Breeze is a daily newspaper published in Hermosa Beach, California, United States. It serves the South Bay cities of Los Angeles County. Its slogan is "LAX to LA Harbor".

== History ==
The paper was founded as the weekly The Breeze in 1894, by local political activist S. D. Barkley and first served the local Redondo Beach community. At that time the town had a population of 500 and included a few buildings and Hotel Redondo. Barkley aligned himself with The Wets, a group of four local saloonkeepers who wanted to remain open while The Drys opposed alcohol consumption and fought to close them. In 1910, residents voted against closing them.

Barkley operated the paper for about two decades until selling it around 1913 to George Murphy, who was soon succeeded by Frank L. Perry. The paper changed hands seven times in two years. In 1917, it came under the ownership of George F. Orgibet. Five years later in 1922, Orgibet sold the weekly paper to K.W. Kellogg, who then expanded it into a daily publication. In 1928, Copley Press purchased the Daily Breeze and 14 other paper from Kellogg Newspapers, Inc.

In December 2006, the paper was sold by Copley Press to the Hearst Corporation in a complex transaction that left the paper under the day-to-day control of Dean Singleton's MediaNews Group and its subsidiary, the Los Angeles Newspaper Group (LANG). Singleton announced that he would fold the paper into the LANG operations, but not cut salaries. Singleton will eventually come to own the Daily Breeze under a 2007 plan to acquire ownership of the paper as part of a swap with Hearst in which Hearst would trade some California papers and the St. Paul Pioneer Press for an increased stake in Singleton's non-California operations.

In 2008, the paper ceased producing its weekly supplement, More San Pedro. Nine staff members were laid off at the same time including four reporters, a web editor, and a newsroom assistant. In 2015, the Daily Breeze won two major awards for its series of investigative reports, throughout 2014, regarding a financial scandal in the Centinela Valley Union High School District. In March, the paper won a Scripps Howard National Journalism Award for Community Journalism for the investigation, and in April the Pulitzer Prize for Local Reporting.

== In popular culture ==
The film Pineapple Express and television show Zeke & Luther have filmed at the Daily Breeze's previous headquarters location in Torrance, California.
