= AOA =

Aoa, AOA, or AoA may refer to:

== Government ==
- Agreement on Agriculture, a World Trade Organization treaty
- Administration on Aging, a health agency of the United States
- Angolan kwanza, the currency of Angola
- Auxiliary Organizations Association, an organized body related to the California State University system
- Analysis of Alternatives, form of trade study used by the Department of Defense

== Science and health ==
- Aoa affinis, a species of butterflies in the family Pieridae
- Age of acquisition, a psycholinguistic term
- Alpha Omega Alpha, a medical honor society
- American Optometric Association, a health association
- American Osteopathic Association, a medical association
- Ammonia-oxidizing archaea performing oxidation of ammonia into nitrite (Nitrification)
- Angle of arrival, direction from which a radio wave arrives at an antenna array
- Angle of attack, a measure of a body through a fluid
- Australian Orthopaedic Association, a not-for-profit organisation

== Administration ==
- Analysis of Alternatives, a method of analyzing choices
- Articles of association, a document that establishes the basic details of a corporation
- Activity on arrow, the activities on the arrows of the arrow diagramming method in project planning

== Aviation ==
- Air operations area, the area of an airport used for landing, takeoff, or surface maneuvering of aircraft
- Airport Operators Association, a trade association for UK airport operators
- American Overseas Airlines, a former transport company
- Angle of attack, the angle between the chord line of the wing of a fixed-wing aircraft and the vector representing the relative motion between the aircraft and the atmosphere
- Abort once around, a type of Space Shuttle abort mode

== Entertainment ==
- AOA (group), a South Korean girl group debuted in 2012
- Act of Aggression, video game
- Age of Apocalypse, a comic storyline
- Aniplex of America, an anime licensor
- Armies of Arcana, a tabletop war game
- The Axis of Awesome, an Australian comedy band

== Other ==
- ʻAoa, a village in American Samoa
- Adam-Ondi-Ahman, a sacred location for the Latter Day Saints
- American Outlaws Association, a motorcycle club
- Andrews Osborne Academy, a school
- As-salamu alaykum, traditional meeting between Muslims, coined in late 90's by M. Shomail Haider
- Automated online assistant, a program that attempts to assist users
