= List of people from Santa Barbara, California =

The following is a list of notable people from Santa Barbara, California.

== Notable people from Santa Barbara ==
- Douglas Adams, author
- Elizabeth Laura Adams, writer
- Tal Avitzur, sculptor
- Dylan Axelrod, Major League Baseball player
- Jeff Bridges, actor
- Ashleigh Brilliant, cartoonist and writer
- Princess Lilibet of Sussex, seventh in the line of succession to the British throne.
- Spencer Barnitz, musician
- Edwin Burr Babbitt, U.S. Army major general
- Colleen Ballinger, YouTube personality
- Red Barrett, Major League Baseball player
- Bobby Beausoleil, former member of the Manson Family, currently serving life imprisonment for the murder of his friend Gary Hinman
- Salud Carbajal, U.S. representative
- Ryan Church, Major League Baseball player
- Dakota Collins, soccer player
- Jimmy Connors, Tennis champion
- Kami Craig, Olympic water polo player
- Randall Cunningham, National Football League player
- Shawn Dailey, musician
- Jay Dee Daugherty, drummer
- Marko DeSantis, musician
- Dean Dinning, musician, music producer, bassist
- Dishwalla, post-grunge alternative rock band
- Anthony Edwards, actor
- Cynthia Ettinger, actress
- Chip Foose, actor
- Tyler Fredrickson, National Football League player, TV personality
- Keith Gledhill, tennis player
- Phillip Gonyea, musician
- Martin Gore, english songwriter, founding member of the British group Depeche Mode
- Sue Grafton, author
- Parry Gripp, musician
- Brad Hall, actor
- Mary C. F. Hall-Wood (d. 1899), poet, editor, author
- Cole Hauser, actor
- Marianna Hill, actress
- Eric Christopher Houston, mass-murderer
- Cady Huffman, actress
- Kathy Ireland, supermodel
- Jason Johnson, Major League Baseball player
- William Lassiter, U.S. Army major general
- Jan Lee, former Oregon State Representative
- Chuck Liddell, mixed martial artist
- Alex D. Linz, actor
- The Little Heroes, indie rock band
- Kenny Loggins, musician
- Scott London, journalist, author, and photographer
- Alex Mack, National Football League player
- George K. McGunnegle, U.S. Army officer
- Achok Majak, fashion model
- Randy Mantooth, actor
- Jordan Maron, YouTube personality
- Eddie Mathews, Hall of Fame Major League Baseball player, grew up in Santa Barbara and was nicknamed "The Santa Barbara Bomber" for his home run prowess.
- MIchael McDonald, musician
- Jerry Miley, actor
- Margaret Millar, writer
- Kim Miyori, actress
- Maika Monroe, professional kiteboarder, actress
- Harriet Moody, architect
- Thomas Moran, American landscape artist
- Luke Mullen, actor, filmmaker, environmentalist
- Todd Nichols, musician and member of Toad the Wet Sprocket
- Peter Noone, lead singer Herman's Hermits
- Floyd Norman, animator, writer, comic book artist
- Monica I. Orozco, historian, archivist
- Charles A. Ott, Jr., United States Army Major General, director of the Army National Guard
- Katy Perry, singer-songwriter
- Jeffrey Peterson, technology entrepreneur
- Lakey Peterson, professional surfer
- Glen Phillips, singer-songwriter
- Rebecca N. Porter, educator, author, journalist
- Ben Rattray, founder of Change.org
- Michael Redmond, professional Go player
- James Read, actor
- Todd Rogers, professional beach volleyball player
- Charles R. Schwab, financial executive, founder of Charles Schwab & Co (world's largest discount stockbroker), multi-billionaire
- Edie Sedgwick, actress, model
- Chris Shiflett, Foo Fighters guitarist
- Scott Sipprelle, 2010 Republican nominee for Congress (NJ-12)
- Snot, nu metal band
- Patricia Soltysik, aka Mizmoon, member of the Symbionese Liberation Army
- Donald Spence, musician
- Ryan Spilborghs, Major League Baseball player
- Jeffrey C. Stewart, Professor of Black Studies and Pulitzer Prize winner
- Jackson Stormo (born 1999), basketball player in the Israeli Basketball Premier League
- Soul Majestic, reggae band
- Sugarcult, rock band
- James Arnold Taylor, voice actor
- Mia Talerico, actress
- Toad the Wet Sprocket, folk rock band
- Oprah Winfrey, media personality
- David Woodard, conductor
- Felix Wormser, engineer and U.S. government official
