= Auxiliary Organizations Association =

- Type: 501(c)(3) nonprofit organization
- Tax ID no.: 33-0204176
- Parent organization: California State University
- Revenue: $865k USD (2024)
- Expenses: $976k USD (2024)
- Website: https://csuaoa.org/

The Auxiliary Organizations Association (AOA or CSUAOA) is a supraorganization of members which are auxiliaries to the 23 campuses in the California State University system. There are over 90 member organizations, including development corporations, foundations, student governments and unions, and various others supporting organizations.

The members are hybrid organizations, in as much as they are 501(c)(3) corporations that provide services to state university campuses, which are public agencies. As a result, they are subject both to the California Corporations Code and the California Education Code, in addition to the policies of the California State University and their individual campuses.

== Member organizations ==
- California State University, Office of the Chancellor
  - California State University Foundation
  - California State University Institute
- California State University, Bakersfield
  - Associated Students of CSU Bakersfield, Inc.
  - CSU Bakersfield Auxiliary For Sponsored Programs Administration
  - CSU Bakersfield Foundation
  - CSU Bakersfield Student Centered Enterprises, Inc.
- California State University, Channel Islands
  - Associated Students of CSU Channel Islands, Inc.
  - CSU Channel Islands Foundation
  - Channel Islands University Auxiliary Services, Inc.
- California State University, Chico
  - Associated Students Of CSU Chico
  - Chico State Enterprises
  - The University Foundation, CSU Chico
- California State University, Dominguez Hills
  - Associated Students, CSU Dominguez Hills, Inc.
  - CSU Dominguez Hills Toro Auxiliary Partners
  - CSU Dominguez Hills Philanthropic Foundation
  - The Donald P. and Katherine B. Loker University Student Union, Inc.
- California State University, East Bay
  - Associated Students of CSU East Bay, Inc.
  - CSU East Bay Educational Foundation, Inc.
  - CSU East Bay Foundation, Inc.
- California State University, Fresno
  - Associated Students CSU Fresno
  - CSU Fresno Association, Inc.
  - CSU Fresno Foundation
  - Fresno State Programs For Children, Inc.
  - The Agricultural Foundation of CSU Fresno
  - The CSU Fresno Athletic Corporation
- California State University, Fullerton
  - Associated Students, CSU Fullerton, Inc.
  - Cal State Fullerton Philanthropic Foundation
  - CSU Fullerton Auxiliary Services Corporation
- California State Polytechnic University, Humboldt
  - Associated Students of Cal Poly Humboldt
  - Cal Poly Humboldt Foundation
  - Cal Poly Humboldt Sponsored Programs Foundation
  - Humboldt State University Center Board of Directors
- California State University, Long Beach
  - Associated Students, CSU Long Beach, Inc.
  - CSU Long Beach Research Foundation
  - CSU Long Beach 49er Foundation
  - Forty-Niner Shops, Inc.
- California State University, Los Angeles
  - Associated Students of CSU Los Angeles, Inc.
  - Cal State L.A. University Auxiliary Services, Inc.
  - CSU Los Angeles Foundation
  - University-Student Union Board, CSU Los Angeles
- California State University Maritime Academy
  - Associated Students of the California Maritime Academy
  - Cal Maritime Corporation
  - California Maritime Academy Foundation, Inc.
- California State University, Monterey Bay
  - Foundation of CSU Monterey Bay
  - Otter Student Union at CSU Monterey Bay
  - University Corporation at Monterey Bay
- California State University, Northridge
  - Associated Students, CSU Northridge, Inc.
  - North Campus – University Park Development Corporation
  - The CSU Northridge Foundation
  - The University Corporation
  - University Student Union of CSU Northridge
- California State Polytechnic University, Pomona
  - Associated Students, California State Polytechnic Pomona, Inc.
  - Cal Poly Pomona Foundation, Inc.
  - Cal Poly Pomona Philanthropic Foundation
- California State University, Sacramento
  - Associated Students of CSU Sacramento
  - Capital Public Radio, Inc.
  - The University Foundation at Sacramento State
  - University Enterprises, Inc.
  - University Union Operation of CSU Sacramento
- California State University, San Bernardino
  - Associated Students, CSU San Bernardino, Inc.
  - CSU San Bernardino Philanthropic Foundation
  - Santos Manuel Student Union of CSU San Bernardino
  - University Enterprises Corporation at CSU San Bernardino
- San Diego State University
  - Associated Students, San Diego State
  - Aztec Shops Ltd.
  - San Diego State Research Foundation
  - The Campanile Foundation
  - San Diego State Mission Valley Enterprises
- San Francisco State University
  - Associated Students of San Francisco State
  - San Francisco State Foundation
  - The University Corporation, San Francisco State
- San José State University
  - Associated Students, San José State
  - San José State Research Foundation
  - Spartan Shops, Inc.
  - The Student Union Of San José State
  - The Tower Foundation Of San José State
- California Polytechnic State University, San Luis Obispo
  - Associated Students of California Polytechnic State at San Luis Obispo, Inc.
  - Cal Poly Corporation
  - California Polytechnic State Foundation
- California State University, San Marcos
  - Associated Students of CSU San Marcos, Inc.
  - CSU San Marcos Corporation
  - CSU San Marcos Foundation
- Sonoma State University
  - Associated Students of Sonoma State
  - Sonoma State Enterprises, Inc.
  - Sonoma State Foundation
- California State University, Stanislaus
  - Associated Students of CSU Stanislaus, Inc.
  - CSU Stanislaus Auxiliary And Business Services
  - CSU Stanislaus Foundation
  - University Student Center of CSU Stanislaus
