= Joseph I. Castro =

American academic administrator (1966–2025)

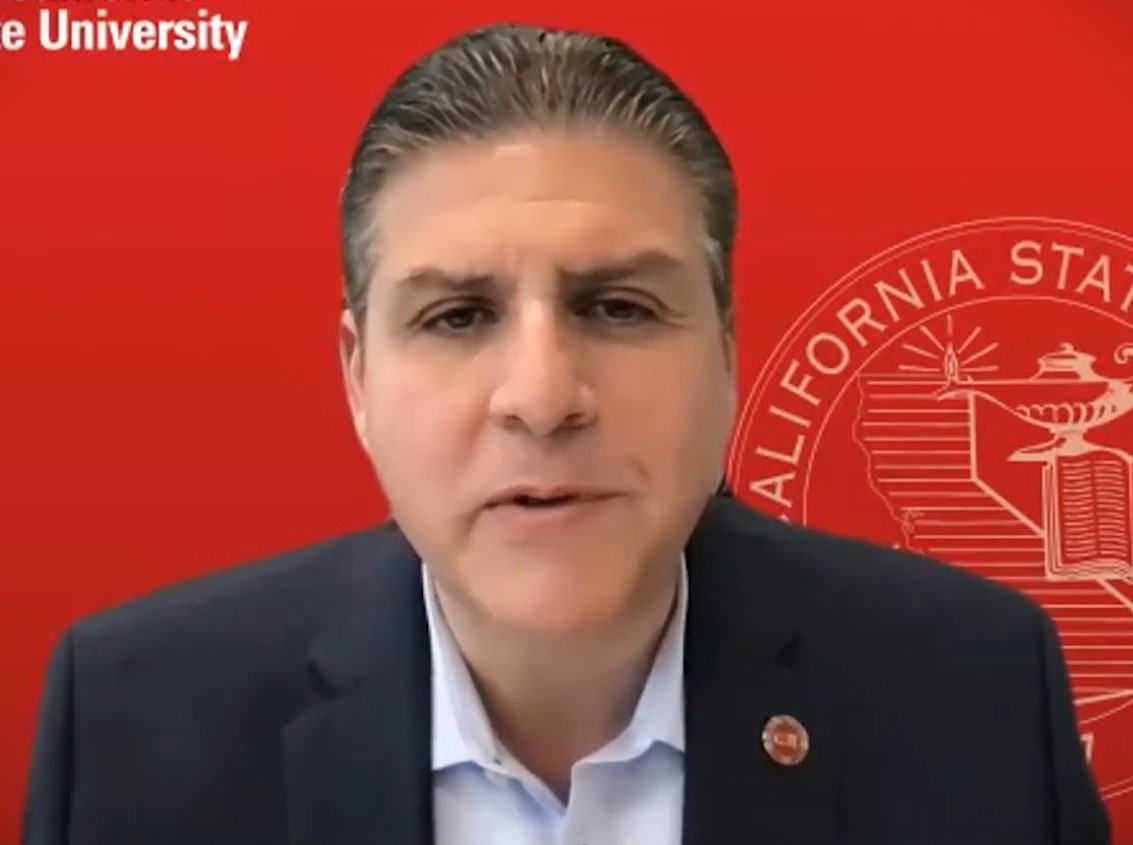
- Castro in 2022

8th Chancellor of the California State University
- In office 2021–2022
- Preceded by: Timothy P. White
- Succeeded by: Steve Relyea (acting); Jolene Koester

9th President of the California State University, Fresno
- In office 2013–2020
- Preceded by: John Welty
- Succeeded by: Saúl Jiménez-Sandoval

Personal details
- Born: Joseph Isaac Castro; November 21, 1966 Hanford, California, U.S.
- Died: August 24, 2025 (aged 58) Orange, California, U.S.
- Education: University of California, Berkeley (BA, MPP); Stanford University (PhD)
- Website: Dr. Joseph I. Castro

Academic background
- Thesis: Presidential optimism and leadership (1998)
- Doctoral advisor: James G. March

Academic work
- Discipline: Higher education
- Institutions: University of California, Berkeley; University of California, Santa Barbara; University of California, Davis; University of California, Merced; University of California, San Francisco; California State University

Joseph Isaac Castro (November 21, 1966 – August 24, 2025) was an American academic who was the eighth chancellor of the California State University. Before that, Castro was the eighth president of California State University, Fresno, and the first California native and first Mexican-American to hold the position. In 2016, he received the Ohtli Award from the Mexican government. He resigned in 2022 as CSU chancellor after accusations of mishandling sexual harassment claims against a fellow administrator.

== Background ==
Castro was born in the city of Hanford, California, on November 21, 1966. He was raised by his mother with the help of his grandparents, who were farm workers from Mexico. In 1984, Castro graduated from Hanford High School, where he was the editor of the school paper and a varsity tennis player. Family members and teachers encouraged him to attend college and he participated in a program to help Latino students from Valley farming communities attend college. As part of the program, he attended an event at the University of California, Berkeley, where he was immediately admitted and granted scholarships.

As the first in his family to attend college, Castro earned a bachelor's degree in political science in 1988 and a master's degree in public policy in 1990 from the University of California, Berkeley. In 1998, he received a Ph.D. in higher education policy and leadership from Stanford University.

Castro died from cancer on August 24, 2025, at the age of 58, while in hospice care at the UC Irvine Medical Center in Orange, California.

== Career ==
During the course of his career, Castro held various positions, including faculty and administrative roles, at five University of California campuses, University of California, Berkeley, University of California, Santa Barbara, University of California, Davis, University of California, Merced, and University of California, San Francisco. In the 1990s he was director of academic programs at the University of California Center. Castro was a part of the founding team at University of California, Merced. He was also a professor for educational research and administration in the Kremen School of Education and Human Development at California State University, Fresno.

Castro became president of California State University, Fresno in 2013, succeeding John Welty. Prior to his role as president, he served as vice-chancellor for student academic affairs at the University of California, San Francisco. The Mountain West Conference appointed Castro as a member of the College Football Playoff Board of Managers, as one of 11 university presidents on the board.

Castro played a lead role in securing and implementing a $500,000 grant from the College Futures Foundation to the Fresno Unified School District, University of California, Merced, the State Center Community College, and University of California, Fresno to collaboratively analyze data to suggest policy changes within the involved institutions to increase student success.

Castro was one of three individuals to be awarded the Stanford Graduate School of Education's (GSE) 2016 Alumni Excellence in Education Award that recognizes alumni who are making a notable difference within their institutions, communities, and policy, at large.

In 2015, the Islamic Cultural Center of Fresno awarded Castro the Spirit of Abraham Award for his efforts to provide Muslim students a space to conduct religious practices and prayer.

In 2016, the Ministry of Foreign Affairs of Mexico awarded Castro with the Ohtli Award, which is presented to individuals who have made a notable contribution in Mexican, Mexican American, and Hispanic Communities. Castro received the award for his work increasing graduation rates among students and his collaboration with the Mexican consulate to implement several programs. The Ohtli Award is Mexico's highest honor.

Castro, in conjunction with California State University, Fresno, were recognized with the Mayor's Community Partner Award for their work in the community, collaborating with public and private organizations, to improve the quality of life in Fresno in 2017.

The Fresno City Council named Castro as Fresno District 4's first Man of the Year, in 2018. The same year, he was awarded California State University President of the Year by the California State Student Association.

In 2019, Castro, on behalf of California State University, Fresno, was awarded a fifth Excellence and Innovation Award from the American Association of State Colleges and Universities since the program's beginning in 2013.

On September 23, 2020, the California State University announced that Castro had been selected to become its eighth chancellor in January 2021.

Castro resigned effective February 17, 2022, due to his handling of sexual harassment claims while at Fresno State. There were seven complaints against a fellow administrator for sexual harassment, yet Castro let that administrator leave "with $260,000 and a letter of recommendation"; a system-wide report concluded that Castro "had allowed [the administrator's] misconduct to continue by not taking more aggressive and consistent action". Castro resigned, then exercised a clause in his contract that allowed him to take a faculty position teaching "leadership and public policy", despite complaints from the faculty union that he was not qualified for the position, and student complaints about his mishandling of the sexual harassment complaints.
