= Extravaganza (music festival) =

Campus music festival held in Santa Barbara, California, U.S.

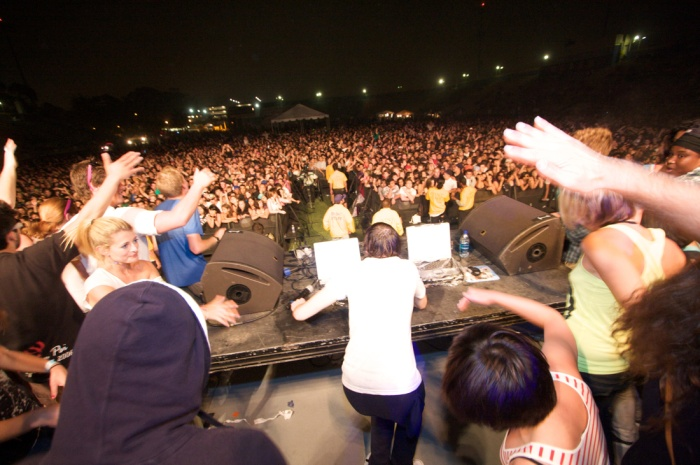
- Girl Talk performing at Extravaganza on May 16, 2009
- Genre: Hip hop, rock, pop, hardcore, reggae
- Dates: Mid to late May
- Locations: University of California, Santa Barbara; Santa Barbara, California
- Years active: 1979–2019, 2021-present
- Founders: Associated Students of the University of California, Santa Barbara

Extravaganza is an annual campus music festival held at the University of California, Santa Barbara that began in 1979 and has been held annually since 1989, except in 2020. Named as the #1 event on the "Top 10 University Festivals to Crash" by College Magazine in 2013, it takes place towards the end of spring quarter and is funded by a student lock-in fee. The event is planned, promoted, and run by the Associated Students Program Board, part of the Associated Students of the University of California, Santa Barbara.

Extravaganza is held in Harder Stadium and draws thousands of students and out-of-town visitors yearly. The stage occupies the north end of the field while booths for student groups, sponsors, and activities line the sides. Attendees must comply with a mandatory pat down and bag search (carried out by Community Service Organization officers) before entering the stadium.

== History ==
In its early years, Extravaganza began as a showcase for local bands. It had originally been open to UCSB students as well as the surrounding community. Due to rising costs and increasing crowds, as of the 2011 edition only those with a UCSB affiliation are allowed entry.

Extravaganza expanded to feature two stages, but this practice was ended in 2005 due to a decision to downsize the number of bands in favor of bigger-name acts. However, the first performer remains a local act, usually chosen through a Battle of the Bands. The acts have also transitioned into more well-known, mainstream performers than those of earlier versions of Extravaganza.

May 16, 2009, was Extravaganza's 30th anniversary. The format of the festival was altered to mark this special occasion. Instead of being the usual day show (11 AM to dusk), X '09 transitioned from day to night, with gates opening at 3 PM and the headliner (Ludacris) concluding his set at approximately midnight. A large high-definition screen was placed next to the stage to give the back of the crowd a better view of the acts. ASPB requested student-made short film submissions to be played between sets.

There was no Extravaganza in 2020 due to the COVID-19 pandemic, and the following year's festival was entirely virtual.

== Talent ==
=== 1980s ===
- June 1, 1980

Jailbait, Reverie, Tom Ball & Kenny Sultan, Oasis, Steve Wood & Beth Fichet Band, John Kay & Steppenwolf, Cecilio & Kapono, Kaikea Roe, Kapono Lizama,

- May 31, 1981

100%, Missing Persons, Pelin, Wild Blue Yonder, Eric Burdon, Paul Rodriguez, Contingency

- May 16, 1982

The Beat, D-Day, Al Vizzutti, Skanksters, Pura Vida

- May 21, 1983

Mojo, Transport, One Heart, 20/20, Tommy Tutone

- May 20, 1984

Jack Mack and the Heart Attack, The Ventures, Mr. Mister, The Rastafarians, The Michael Jackson Band

- May 17, 1986

Lone Justice, The Busboys, Babylon Warriors, Fishbone, IV All Stars

- May 17, 1987

Common Sense, Confusion, Burning Couches, Crucial DBC

*. May 1988

Stevie Nicks

- May 6, 1989

Jane's Addiction, Mary's Danish, Toad The Wet Sprocket, Common Sense, Burning Couches

=== 1990s ===
- May 19, 1990

Agent Orange, Havalina, Timmy Gatling, Everlast, The Groov, The Itch, Milestone Easy, The Mudheads

- May 11, 1991

Mary's Danish, Trulio Disgresias, No Doubt, Lula and Afro Brasil, Dread Flimstone, Ugly Kid Joe, Montage W/ Soul

- May 16, 1992

Eleven, Fungo Mungo, Skankin' Pickle, Indica, Los Guys, Evil Farmer

- May 22, 1993

Fishbone, The Pharcyde, Taumbu, Half Way Home, Sun 60, Mother Tongue, The Graceful Punks

- May 21, 1994

They Might Be Giants, Del tha Funkee Homosapien, Frente!, Casual, The Muffs, The Grays, Ben Harper

- May 13, 1995

Main Stage: Sublime, Coolio, The Untouchables, Mojo Nixon, The Nonce

Second Stage: Cory Sipper, Poly Chrome, Jimmy 2 Times, Spencer the Gardener, Water, The Ziggens

- May 18, 1996

Main Stage: NOFX, Skankin' Pickle, Tha Alkaholiks, Aceyalone, Big Bad Voodoo Daddy

Second Stage: Jimmy 2 Times, Raging Arb and the Redheads, Much, Speedracer and Spice

- May 17, 1997

Ben Harper, Dance Hall Crashers, Down By Law, Kurtis Blow, World Tribe, The Upbeat, Five For Fighting, Cool Water Canyon, Fidget, The Leftovers

- May 16, 1998 (Note: Event was reduced to one stage due to the 1997–98 El Niño event)

Social Distortion, The Roots, Royal Crown Revue, Ozomatli, Animal Liberation Orchestra

- May 22, 1999

Main Stage: Run-DMC, The Vandals, Hepcat, Del the Funky Homosapien

Second Stage: Blazing Haley, Dial 7, The Cannons, 4DK, D.J. Pat

=== 2000s ===
- May 20, 2000

Main Stage - Spearhead, Ozomatli, The Black Eyed Peas, The Aquabats, Vivendo de Paò

Second Stage - Neosoreskin, Government Grown, Vinyl, Sick Shift, Pressure 4-5

- June 2, 2001 (Note: Event was held at Rob Field due to Harder Stadium renovations.)

Main Stage - The Pharcyde, Save Ferris, Tha Liks, Jack Johnson, Ozma

Second Stage - Gravity Willing, Titsofrenix, Warsaw, Ambionic, Pressure 4-5

- May 18, 2002

De La Soul, The Breeders, Zebrahead, Aceyalone

- May 17, 2003

Main Stage - Dilated Peoples, Slightly Stoopid, Eve 6, Nerf Herder, Dredg

Second Stage - Ankore, Kissing Tigers, the History Of, Blue Room, Falsehood

- May 22, 2004

Main Stage - MxPx, Talib Kweli, Donavon Frankenreiter, The Bronx, MF Doom

Second Stage - Code 415, The Colour, The Penfifteen Club, Satin, The Return

- May 15, 2005

Busta Rhymes, Damian Marley, RJD2, The Walkmen, The Hairbrain Scheme

- May 21, 2006

E-40, Pepper, The Pharcyde, Animal Liberation Orchestra, Rebelution

- May 20, 2007

T.I., Ben Kweller, Mickey Avalon, Suburban Legends, Boombox Orchestra

- May 18, 2008

Nas, Saosin, Hellogoodbye, Blue Scholars, Out of State

- May 16, 2009

Ludacris, Asher Roth (surprise guest), Girl Talk, Cold War Kids, The Cool Kids, Rebelution, Willy Northpole, Boombox Orchestra

=== 2010s ===
- May 15, 2010

Drake, Birdman (surprise guest), Chromeo, Edward Sharpe and the Magnetic Zeros, Super Mash Bros, Soul Minded

- May 15, 2011

Cee Lo Green, Rusko, Talib Kweli, The Expendables, Sprout

- May 20, 2012

Snoop Dogg, Wolfgang Gartner, Iration, Surfer Blood, The Fire Department

- May 19, 2013

Kendrick Lamar, Dada Life, J-Boog, The Growlers, Alpha Phunk

- May 18, 2014

Diplo, Local Natives, Chance the Rapper, Jhené Aiko, Yancellor Chang, T-Fresh

- May 17, 2015

Miguel, Madeon, AlunaGeorge, Joey Bada$$, Bad Rabbits

- May 15, 2016

ODESZA, Rae Sremmurd, Anderson .Paak & the Free Nationals, Zella Day, Emancipator

- May 21, 2017

Schoolboy Q, GRiZ, Tinashe, Thundercat, Twin Peaks

- May 20, 2018

Dillon Francis, Charli XCX, DRAM, Coast Modern

- May 19, 2019

Playboi Carti, Aminé, Deorro, Empress Of, Peach Pit

=== 2020s ===
- May 15-16, 2021

Virtual due to COVID-19: Hasan Minhaj, Dominic Fike, Niki

- May 15, 2022

A$AP Ferg, Dayglow, Valentino Khan

- May 21, 2023

Galantis, Remi Wolf, Destroy Lonely, DJ JohnnyIV

- May 19, 2024

Steve Aoki, Blxst, Disco Lines, Briston Maroney, Willie O’Donnell

- May 18, 2025

Chris Lake, Aminé, Ravyn Lenae, Snow Strippers, Zacari

- May 17, 2026

Dominic Fike, JT, Earl Sweatshirt, Jane Remover

== Attendance ==
- May 22, 2004 : 7,000+
- May 15, 2005 : 9,000+
- May 21, 2006 : 7,000+
- May 20, 2007 : 6,000+
- May 18, 2008 : 8,000+
- May 16, 2009 : 12,000+ overall, with 4,000+ in and out.
- May 15, 2010 : 12,000+ at peak, with 1,500 circulating.

== Lineup release ==
Each year ASPB strives to announce the Extravaganza lineup in a creative manner that encourages student body participation.

- May 18, 2008 : A flash mob of students acting like dinosaurs was organized as a banner bearing the lineup was dropped in Storke Plaza.
- May 16, 2009 : Fortune cookies holding the name of an act were distributed throughout campus to encourage students to share and discuss the lineup.
- April 29, 2010 : A viral marketing campaign was launched on Facebook, Twitter, and the official AS Program Board website. At peak, the website received 1,600 requests per second.
- May 8, 2012 : -
- May 9, 2013 : -
- May 5, 2015 : AS Program Board hid bottles around campus with names of artists inside.
- May 10, 2016 : AS Program Board had a live graffiti artist paint the names of the artists to reveal the lineup.
- May XX, 2017: AS Program Board unveiled banners with the various acts in Storke Plaza.
- May 14, 2018: AS Program Board had a student hide along the coast in a dragon outfit carrying an egg with the headliner.
- May 19th, 2019: -
- 2020: Extravaganza was not held due to the COVID-19 pandemic.
- May 15th and 16th, 2021: -
- May 15th, 2022: -
- May 21st, 2023: The lineup was revealed on the lawn in front of Storke Tower.
- May 9th, 2024: Hints on featured artists were hidden in fortune cookies spread across campus, with the lineup being revealed by "caking" members of the AS Program Board, (referencing a tradition at the live shows of Steve Aoki, that year's headlining act.)
- May 8th, 2025: UCSB's Gaucho Pep Band played for a flash mob consisting of AS Program Board members. Students were then leaded to Storke Tower where the lineup was then revealed.

== Promotional material ==
X '04 Poster
