= Associated Students of the University of California, Santa Barbara =

Students' union of UC Santa Barbara

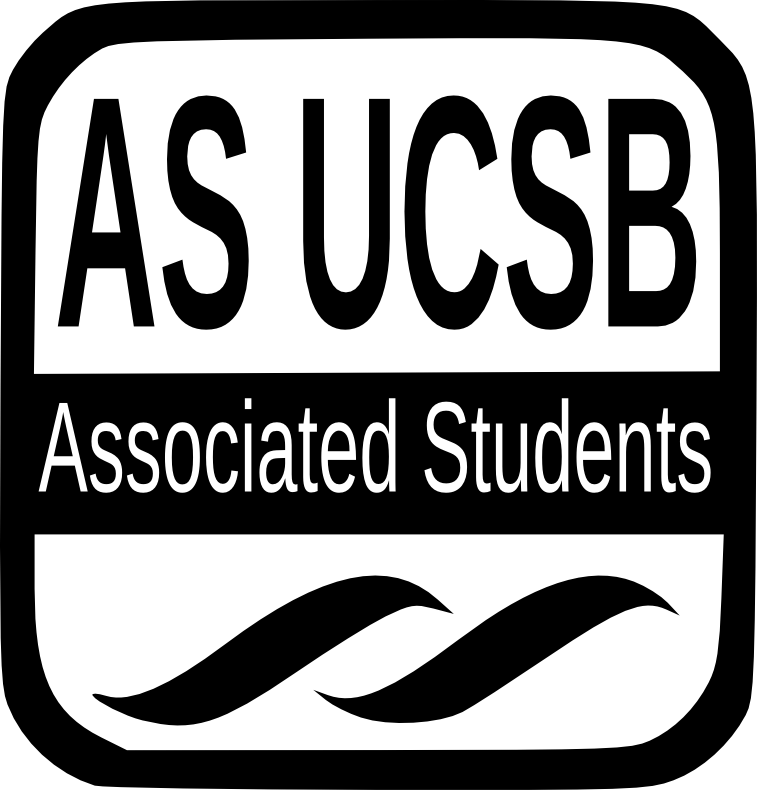
- Founded: 1961
- Tax ID no.: 95-1792262
- Location: University Center, University of California, Santa Barbara
- Coordinates: 34.411569°N 119.846527°W
- Affiliations: UC Student Association
- Revenue: $13,694,895, (FY16)
- Expenses: $12,695,504 (FY16)
- Website: www.as.ucsb.edu

The Associated Students of the University of California, Santa Barbara (ASUCSB) is the undergraduate students' union of the University of California, Santa Barbara. It is one of two students' unions at UCSB, the other being the Graduate Student Association. It purports to be both a non-profit organization and an official department of UCSB. It is classified as an "unincorporated association" by the California Attorney General's Registry of Charitable Trusts. Its goals are to "voice student concerns and express student opinion" and "enrich student life and give students services and opportunities not offered by the [university] administration." ASUCSB derives its authority from section 61.10-15 of the "Policies Applying to Campus Activities, Organizations and Students" of the University of California.

== Structure ==
Like other student governments in the United States, the governing structure of the organization is modeled on the United States government, with executive, legislative, and judicial branches. The operations and policies of the organization are dictated by a set of by-laws called the Associated Students Legal Code.

== Notable projects ==
ASUCSB has traditionally been associated with KCSB-FM, a well known radio station that it funds. KCSB is known for being the starting point of the careers of Jim Rome, Sean Hannity, and Jeffrey Peterson.

Through its Boards, Committees, and Commissions, it has funded and operated campus services such as emergency loans, bike path improvements, and coastal redevelopment. It also co-manages the Events Center, the Recreation Center, and the University Center with the UCSB Chancellor's Office.

The AS Program Board runs events including films, concerts, lectures, and cultural events. Its end of the year music festival is Extravaganza.

== 2026-2027 Executives and Senators ==
The current executive officers are:

- President EJ Raad
- Internal Vice President Victoria Ly
- External Vice President for Statewide Affairs Jasmine Hsieh
- External Vice President for Local Affairs Noah Luken
- Student Advocate General Suyan Wang

The current sitting senators are:

- Off-Campus Senators (12)
  - Adhya Akki
  - Thuy-Vy Addy Nguyen
  - Jesse Guerrero
  - Lucy Lin
  - Jake Horvitz
  - Kyara Vivanco Cortes
  - Leah Namvar
  - Alexander Bondy
  - Evan DiCarlo
  - Faizaan Chunawala
  - Rishi Koteru
  - Luke Lopez
- On-Campus Senators (3)
  - Joshua Gabbay
  - Simai Kang
  - Morsal Abdali
- Off-Campus, University-Owned Senator (1)
  - Aaron Ramirez
- Letters & Science Senators (4)
  - Jasmine Wang
  - Cole Nadershahi
  - Alexandria Turner
  - Shea Sullivan
- Creative Studies Senator (1)
  - Alec GeoSimonian
- International Senator (1)
  - `Chloe Shi
- Transfer Senator (1)
  - Nicole Nunez-Anzueto

== Past Executives and Senators ==
The 2023-2024 executive officers were:

- President Tessa Veksler
- Internal Vice President Sohum Kalia
- External Vice President for Statewide Affairs Vero Caveroegusquiza
- External Vice President for Local Affairs Osaze Osayande
- Student Advocate General Nathan Lee

The current sitting senators are:

- Off-Campus Senators (12):
  - Ephrain Shalunov
  - Eric Carlson
  - Emily von Zedtwitz
  - Abigail Weber
  - Jeffrey Adler
  - Michelle Lebowski
  - Amelia Rowe
  - Sydney Yamanishi
  - Mikayla Martinez
  - Renee Faulk
  - Nayali Broadway
  - Nicole Gabrielson
- On-Campus Senators (5):
  - Leon Barhoum
  - There are four vacancies.
- Off-Campus University Owned Senator (1):
  - Micah Littlepage
- Collegiate Senator - Letters & Science (4):
  - Gabriela Salazar
  - Mia Goren
  - Alejandra Martinez
  - Diana Kero
- Collegiate Senator - Engineering (1):
  - Alvin Wang
- Collegiate Senator - Creative Studies (1):
  - Diya Bhandari
- Transfer Senator (1):
  - Samuel Walker Safahi
- International Senators (2):
  - MingJun Zha
  - Emre Cikisir

== See also ==
- Associated Students of the University of California
- Student governments in the United States
- University of California Student Association
