= John Welty =

Seventh president of Fresno State University (1991–2013)

John D. Welty
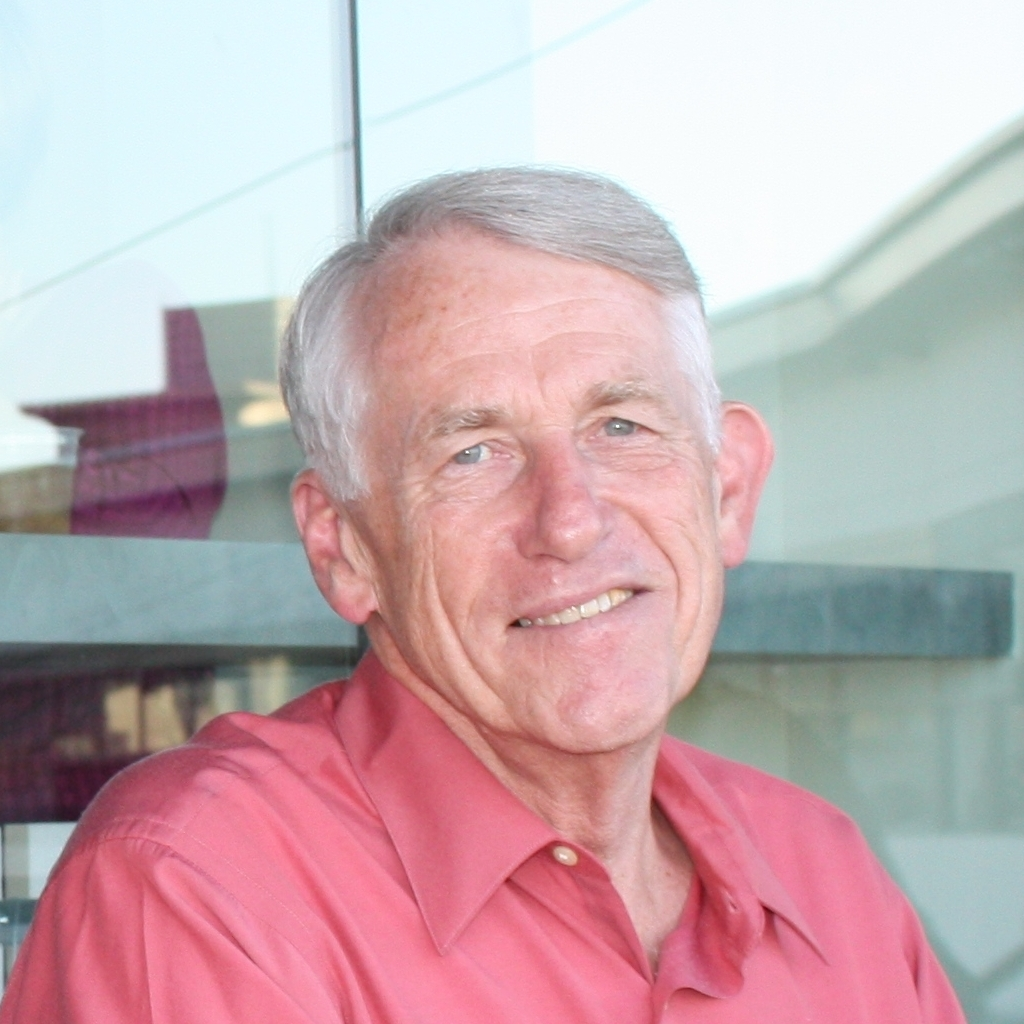
- John Welty at a Fresno Grizzlies game in 2009

7^{th} President of Fresno State University
- President emeritus
- In office July 29, 1991 – May 8, 2013
- Preceded by: Harold H. Haak
- Succeeded by: Joseph I. Castro

18^{th} President of Indiana University of Pennsylvania
- In office July 1, 1985 – July 24, 1991
- Preceded by: John E. Worthen
- Succeeded by: Lawrence K. Pettit

4^{th} Acting President of Indiana University of Pennsylvania
- Interim
- In office July 1, 1984 – June 30, 1985
- Preceded by: Bernard J. Ganley
- Succeeded by: Charles R. Fuget

Personal details
- Born: August 1944 (age 82) Amboy, Illinois, U.S.
- Spouse: Sharon L. Brown-Welty
- Children: Five
- Education: Western Illinois University (B.S. Social Science, 1965); Michigan State University (M.A. College Student Counseling & Personnel Services, 1967)
- Alma mater: Indiana University Bloomington (Ed.D. Administration in Higher Education, 1974)
- Occupation: Senior Consultant, AASCU Consulting
- Profession: Professor of Education
- Awards: President of the Year (2001, 2011), California State Student Association; Chief Executive Leadership Award (1999), Council for Advancement and Support for Education
- Board member of: California Health Sciences University, Founding Chairman (July 2012–); WACD, Chairman (March 2020–); California Health Care Foundation (March 2012 – February 2021)

Academic work
- Discipline: Sociology
- Sub-discipline: Organizational behavior
- Institutions: Michigan State University (Admissions counselor); Southwest Minnesota State University (Assistant Vice President, Student affairs); University at Albany, SUNY (Asscciate Dean, Student affairs); San Bernardino State University – Palm Desert Campus (Trustee professor)

John D. Welty, a native of Amboy, Illinois, was the seventh and longest-serving president of Fresno State University before retiring on May 8, 2013. He was appointed president on July 29, 1991. Before coming to Fresno, he had previously served as president of Indiana University of Pennsylvania for seven years. Welty received a doctorate in administration of higher education from Indiana University Bloomington in 1976.

In recognition of his highly productive career in higher education, Welty was awarded an Honorary Doctorate of Humane Letters from Western Illinois University, where he completed his undergraduate studies in 1965 before going on to Michigan State University.

On August 17, 2012, Welty announced that he would retire as president of Fresno State in the summer of 2013.

== Career ==
- California State University, Fresno: President and Professor of Education (1991–2013)
- Indiana University of Pennsylvania: President (1985–1991); Interim President (1984–1985); Vice President for Student and University Affairs (1980–1984)
- State University of New York at Albany: Associate Dean for Student Affairs/Director of Residences and Adjunct Assistant Professor, Counseling Psychology and Student Development (1977–1980); Director of Residences and Adjunct Professor, Counseling and Personnel Services (1974–1977)
- Southwest State University, Marshall, Minnesota: Chairman, Division of Student Development and Instructor of Education (1967–1974)
- Michigan State University, East Lansing: Admissions Counselor and Assistant Director, New Student Orientation Program (1966–1967)

=== Board Service in Higher Education ===
John D. Welty has served on both of the California State University (CSU) System's major strategic planning efforts and participated in the creation of the Voluntary System of Accountability which has been adopted by over 200 colleges and universities.

During his career in higher education, Welty has served on several advisory groups to the U.S. Departments of Education and Agriculture. He is the past-chair of the Renaissance Group, which is a national organization of over 30 universities charged with improving teacher education programs. Welty co-chaired the California State University's effort to create CALState Teach, a program designed for emergency credentialed teachers. He currently serves as Chair of the CSU Gender Equity Monitoring Committee.

In 2000, John Welty was elected to serve as the Western Association of Schools and Colleges (WASC) Commissioner and served a three-year term. He is past chair of the American Association of State Colleges and Universities (AASCU) and the Western Athletic Conference Board of Directors.

== Honors and awards ==
- Fresno Business Council's Excellence in Public Service Award (2003)
- CSU President of the Year, given by the California State Student Association (2001 & 2011)
- International Who's Who of Professionals (2000)
- Honorary American FFA Degree (2000)
- Chief Executive Leadership Award, Council for Advancement and Support Education (1999)
- Alumni Achievement Award, Western Illinois University (1994)
- ACPA Commission III Outstanding Service Award (1979)
- Chancellor's Award for Excellence in Administration, State University of New York at Albany (1977)
- Robert H. Shaffer Distinguished Alumnus Award, Indiana University, Bloomington, Indiana (1986)

== Controversy ==
In April 2011, his wife was appointed dean of graduate studies at Fresno State. The appointment was questioned by some faculty members while other positions and salaries are in the process of being cut. The provost announced Brown-Welty's appointment less than a week after the previous dean announced her departure and without searching or accepting other applications. Some faculty have accused the university of making the appointment so that Brown-Welty could retire with a higher pension.
