= Monica I. Orozco =

American historian

- Born: Santa Barbara, California
- Education: University of California, Santa Barbara
- Occupations: Historian & Archivist

Monica I. Orozco (born in Santa Barbara, California) is a historian and archivist. She is the Director of the Santa Barbara Mission-Archive Library as well as Executive Director of Mission Santa Barbara. She earned her doctorate in History at University of California, Santa Barbara in 1999, completing her dissertation entitled "Protestant Missionaries, Mexican Liberals, Nationalism and the Issue of Cultural Incorporation of Indians, 1870-1900." The dissertation focuses on the opening to foreign Protestants during the liberal era in Mexico, and their shared aim of incorporating indigenous culturally. She has published a portion of her dissertation.

She taught Latin American history at University of California, Santa Barbara, Westmont College, and Santa Barbara City College. She also worked as an editor at ABC-CLIO. Since 2009 she has served as the second lay director and professional archivist at the Santa Barbara Mission Archive-Library. In 2016 she became the first lay executive director of the Santa Barbara Mission. She is featured in a C-SPAN program on the Santa Barbara Mission and the Mission Archive-Library, highlighting the importance of both to the cultural life of the American West, California history, and indigenous history.

== See also ==
- List of people from Santa Barbara, California
