= Student Senate for the California Community Colleges =

Student Senate for California Community Colleges (SSCCC) is a California public-benefit nonprofit corporation. SSCCC came into existence on April 29, 2015 when a document titled "Articles of Incorporation of Student Senate for California Community Colleges" was filed in the office of the secretary of state of California. Prior to that filing, the Articles were signed by a community college student named Omar Paz Jr. Omar is the founder and "Incorporator" of SSCCC. In his capacity as Incorporator, Omar elected the initial directors of SSCCC.

The Board of Governors of the California Community Colleges has recognized "the Student Senate for California Community Colleges as the statewide community college student organization to represent community college students within the California Community Colleges, including before the Board of Governors and the Chancellor's Office".

== History ==
=== Establishment ===
Chapter 973 of the California Statutes of 1988 added Section 70901 to the California Education Code. Section 70901 provides that "the board of governors shall establish and carry out a process for consultation with institutional representatives of community college districts so as to ensure their participation in the development and review of policy proposals". In March 1988 the Board of Governors of the California Community Colleges adopted a "formal policy on Consultation". The policy on Consultation included "a Standing Order which set up seven councils", including a "Council of Student Body Governments". In September 1990 the Board of Governors recognized the Council of Student Body Governments "as the official organization representing students in the statewide Consultation process".

In 1996 the Council of Student Body Governments was renamed the "Student Senate". Later that year, the Board of Governors recognized "the Student Senate for the California Community Colleges as the representative of community college-associated student organizations before the Board of Governors and the Chancellor's Office". This recognition process changed the name of the Student Senate to "Student Senate for the California Community Colleges". The operation of the Student Senate for the California Community Colleges was funded by the State of California in accordance with California Education Code Section 71040.

On October 18, 2002, Thomas J. Nussbaum (who was then the Chancellor of the California Community Colleges) and the California Student Association of Community Colleges signed a memorandum of understanding which provided that the elected members of the association's "Policy Board" would serve ex-officio as the members of the Student Senate for the California Community Colleges. In May 2005 Chancellor Marshall (Mark) Drummond rescinded the memorandum of understanding.

On May 7, 2006, community college students established an "unincorporated association" named "Student Senate for California Community Colleges". The association solicited and received charitable contributions. It also solicited and received donations of student representation fees that had been collected in accordance with California Education Code Section 76060.5.

In 2013 the unincorporated SSCCC supported the amendment of California Education Code Section 76060.5. Amendments to Section 76060.5 were enacted and became effective on January 1, 2014. The amendments provide, in part, that "a statewide community college student organization" must be "established as a legal entity registered with the Secretary of State" in order to qualify to receive distributions of student representation fees from the Board of Governors of the California Community Colleges. A nonprofit California corporation named "Student Senate for California Community Colleges" was established by Omar Paz Jr. in 2015 as a means of fulfilling the "legal entity" requirement in Section 76060.5, as amended. The name "California Community Colleges" is the property of the State of California and the incorporated SSCCC has permission to use that name in its corporate name.

=== Predecessor organizations ===
The unincorporated SSCCC was established in May 2006. It was preceded by several similar organizations: the California Junior College Association; the California Community College Student Government Association; the Community College Student Lobby; and the California Student Association of Community Colleges (CalSACC).

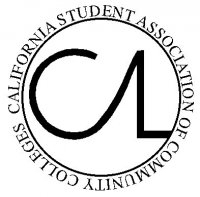
CalSACC logo

CalSACC was established on November 15, 1987. In 1999, CalSACC's membership included 72 community college student body associations. By 2005, CalSACC's membership had dwindled to just 31 student body associations. And by 2007, CalSACC had become "virtually non-existent". In 2008 CalSACC's remaining assets were donated to the unincorporated SSCCC. The sum of $57,150.53 was transferred to the unincorporated SSCCC on June 3, 2008.

CalSACC had ten organizational subdivisions, which were called "regions". During the gradual disintegration and ultimate dissolution of CalSACC, its regions continued functioning autonomously. On May 6 and 7, 2006, representatives of the CalSACC regions and student leaders from throughout California gathered at the Hyatt Regency Hotel in San Diego, California. They considered several model constitutions for a new statewide student organization. They adopted constitutional model "E" by a vote of 59 in favor and 11 opposed. The adoption of the new constitution established an unincorporated association named "Student Senate for California Community Colleges".

The Chancellor of the California Community Colleges has established a set of "Executive Orders" relating to the Chancellor's "Consultation Council". The first order provides that, "The Consultation Council shall consist of the Chancellor of the California Community Colleges and the following membership... 1 representative of the California Student Association of Community Colleges" (CalSACC). The Consultation Council "Members" list does not include the name and contact information of a CalSACC representative. The absence of this contact information reinforces the belief that CalSACC is no longer in operation.

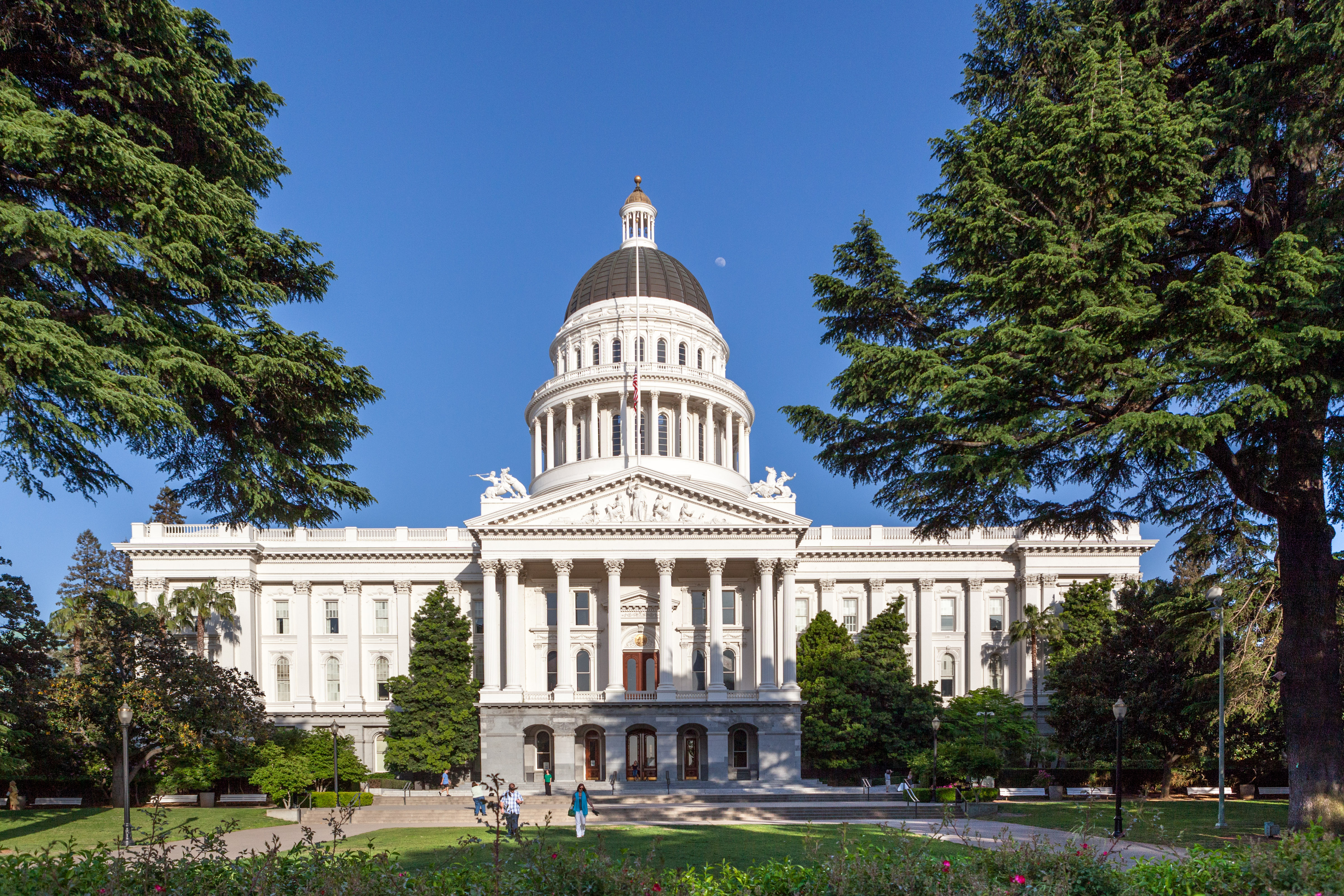
Western steps and entrance of the California State Capitol.

=== Noteworthy events ===
On March 5, 2012, the unincorporated SSCCC, the California State Student Association, and the University of California Student Association sponsored a rally at the California State Capitol. About 8,000 people gathered on the western steps of the capitol and listened to speeches by student leaders and by state leaders, including Lieutenant Governor Gavin Newsom, Assembly Speaker John Pérez, and Senate President Pro Tem Darrell Steinberg. After the rally, protestors from the Occupy movement entered the capitol and refused to leave. Officers of the California Highway Patrol arrested 72 people for trespassing. These events generated dozens of news reports.

Student Senate for California Community Colleges
- SSCCC Logo
- Formation: April 29, 2015; 11 years ago
- Founder: Omar Paz Jr.
- Type: Nonprofit corporation
- Tax ID no.: 47–5327498, tax status: Federal & State
- Registration no.: C3782868
- Legal status: Active, definition of
- Purpose: Charitable, R.C.T. file number CT0227572
- Location: 1121 L Street, Suite 600, Sacramento, CA, 95814
- Methods: Legislative advocacy and participation in state-level shared governance
- Members: 87 student body associ-ations and 2 community college districts.
- Staff: Julie Adams CAE
- Board of directors: A presiding officer and 5 vice presidents and 20 directors
- Main organ: SSCCC General Assembly
- Publication: SSCCC Connect
- Budget: $2,300,000 USD
- Revenue: $2,161,366; FYE 6-30-2023
- Website: ssccc.org

== The incorporated SSCCC ==
A document titled "Articles of Incorporation of Student Senate for California Community Colleges" was filed in the office of the California Secretary of State on April 29, 2015. The filing of that document initiated the existence of a California nonprofit public benefit corporation named "Student Senate for California Community Colleges". The corporation's "specific purposes" are stated in "Article II" of the Articles of Incorporation. The purposes include: "To improve student access, promote student success, engage and empower local student leaders, and enrich the collegiate experience for all California community college students".

The United States Internal Revenue Service has determined that the incorporated SSCCC is organized for charitable purposes and that it is exempt from federal income tax under Section 501(c)(3) of the Internal Revenue Code. The Internal Revenue Service has also determined that the incorporated SSCCC must annually file a "Return of Organization Exempt From Income Tax" (Form 990).

An accountancy firm named Gilbert Associates, Inc. prepared a "Return of Organization Exempt From Income Tax" for the incorporated SSCCC for the tax year beginning July 1, 2017 and ending June 30, 2018. The Return shows that the incorporated SSCCC had "Total revenue" of $315,002 and at the end of that tax year the incorporated SSCCC had "Total assets" of $316,231. The Return also shows that the incorporated SSCCC had a governing body composed of 26 voting members.

=== Corporate governance ===
The powers of the incorporated SSCCC are exercised by or under the direction of a "board of directors", as required by law. The SSCCC Board of Directors includes 20 regionally elected Directors and six officers of the corporation. The officers are elected by "Delegates" during an annual meeting of the Delegates. Each community college student body association may designate one Delegate.

=== Financial statements, 2017–2018 ===
The incorporated SSCCC has produced financial statements for the fiscal year that ended on June 30, 2018. Those financial statements were reviewed by a California-licensed accountancy firm named Gilbert Associates, Inc. The firm concluded, "Based on our review, we are not aware of any material modifications that should be made to the accompanying financial statements in order for them to be in accordance with accounting principles generally accepted in the United States of America".

=== Principal office and officers ===
Each nonprofit public benefit corporation must periodically file with the California Secretary of State a form that contains information about the corporation. The incorporated SSCCC was formed in an odd-numbered year (the year 2015) so it must file a "Statement of Information" form for each succeeding odd-numbered year.

A Statement of Information about the incorporated SSCCC was filed in the office of the California Secretary of State on February 12, 2021. A copy of that statement is posted on the Secretary of State's website. The statement shows that the incorporated SSCCC's principal office is located in the California Community Colleges building at 1102 Q Street, Sacramento, California. The statement also includes the names of the corporation's principal officers.

=== Advocacy ===
On March 20, 2017, the Board of Governors of the California Community Colleges approved a "Memorandum of Understanding" which recognizes that the incorporated SSCCC is a statewide community college student organization within the meaning of California Education Code Section 76060.5. That recognition makes the incorporated SSCCC eligible to receive distributions of student representation fees from the Board of Governors. The Memorandum of Understanding provides that the Board of Governors may cancel the memorandum upon thirty days written notice to SSCCC.

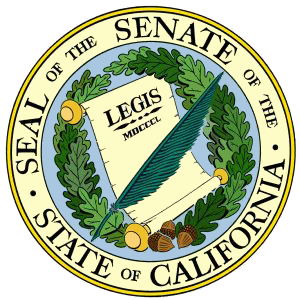
Seal of the Senate of the State of California

Student representation fees are used to support the incorporated SSCCC's "Legislative Affairs" representatives. These representatives engage in legislative advocacy by contacting members of the California Legislature and by testifying before committees of the Legislature. Their efforts to influence the decisions of California legislators and officials must be conducted in accordance with the "Political Reform Act of 1974". The provisions of that Act are administered by the Political Reform Division of the California Secretary of State's office.

=== Participation in shared governance ===
The Chancellor has established a "Consultation Council" in accordance with the Board of Governors' policy on Consultation and applicable law. The Council of Student Body Governments was "renamed the Student Senate for purposes of the Consultation Process (the statewide shared governance program) and the Board of Governors Standing Orders". More recently, the Board of Governors recognized the Student Senate for the California Community Colleges "as the representative of community college students in conjunction with the associated student organizations in the Consultation Process and before the Board of Governors and Chancellor's Office".

On May 8, 2020, the Board of Governors and the incorporated SSCCC executed a "Memorandum of Understanding" (MOU). The MOU provides, in part, that the incorporated SSCCC "shall provide representatives from its leadership at monthly meetings of the Chancellor's Consultation Council". In accordance with this requirement, the President and the Vice President of Legislative Affairs of the incorporated SSCCC are serving as members of the Consultation Council.

=== Student Aid Commission nominees ===
The Student Aid Commission has delegated to its Director (its chief executive officer) the power to determine whether a particular student organization is "a composite group of at least five representative student government associations". The Director may invite student organizations that meet this standard to nominate three to five students to serve as members of the commission. The Director has determined that the incorporated SSCCC is "a composite group of at least five representative student government associations" and that the incorporated SSCCC is eligible to nominate students to serve as members of the commission. The Director periodically invites the incorporated SSCCC to submit a list of nominees to the Governor.

=== Board of Governors nominees ===
The Board of Governors of the California Community Colleges is composed of 17 members, including 2 student members. In 2007 and earlier, students were periodically nominated to serve as members of the board of governors by an unincorporated association named "California Student Association of Community Colleges" (CalSACC). After January 1, 2008, students were nominated by a Board of Governors task force named "Student Senate for the California Community Colleges", which was then "the student organization recognized by the board of governors". On July 21, 2020, the incorporated SSCCC became the student organization recognized by the Board of Governors. The incorporated SSCCC is now the student organization that nominates students to serve as members of the Board of Governors.

=== Reports to the California Attorney General ===
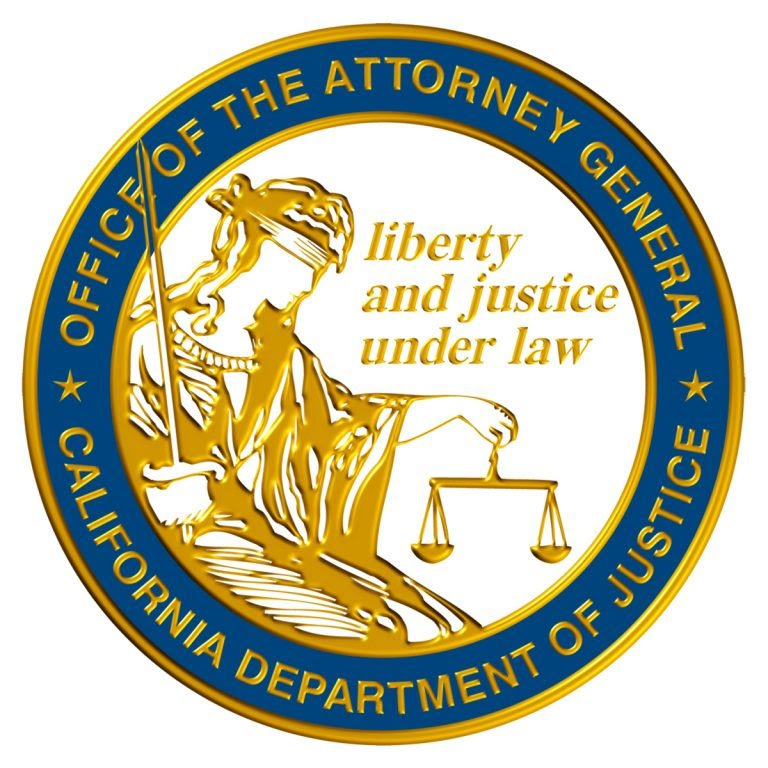
Seal of the California Attorney General

The incorporated SSCCC is registered with the California Attorney General's Registry of Charitable Trusts. SSCCC is required by law to "file with the Attorney General periodic written reports, under oath, setting forth information as to the nature of the assets held for charitable purposes". SSCCC's report for the period beginning April 29, 2015 and ending December 31, 2015 shows that SSCCC's revenue was $0 and that its total assets had a value of $0. The report for January 1, 2016 through December 31, 2016 shows revenue of $0 and total assets of $0. The report for January 1, 2017 through June 30, 2017 shows revenue of $0 and total assets of $0. Each of these reports was signed on November 2, 2017, by Courtney L. Cooper, who was at that time SSCCC's "chief executive officer".

=== Recognition of the incorporated SSCCC ===
At its meeting of July 20–21, 2020, the Board of Governors of the California Community Colleges amended Section 50002 of Title 5 of the California Code of Regulations. The amendment to Section 50002 deleted two references to the Board of Governors' task force named "Student Senate for the California Community Colleges". The amendment also provides that the corporation named "Student Senate for California Community Colleges" is recognized by the Board of Governors "as the statewide community college student organization to represent community college students within the California Community Colleges, including before the Board of Governors and the Chancellor's Office".
