= Rigel Robinson =

American politician

Berkeley City Council
- In office 2018–2024

Personal details
- Born: June 21, 1996 (age 30)
- Party: Democratic
- Education: University of California, Berkeley (BA, MPA)

Rigel Robinson is an American politician who served as a Berkeley city councilmember from 2018 to 2024. When elected, Robinson became the youngest city councilmember in Berkeley's history. Robinson was a candidate for Berkeley mayor in the 2024 election before suspending his campaign.

== Early life and education ==
Robinson grew up in St. Louis, Missouri. He came to Berkeley as a student at UC Berkeley, where he was elected the external affairs vice president of the Associated Students of the University of California. Robinson earned his master's degree at the Goldman School of Public Policy while serving on the city council.

== Berkeley City Council ==
Robinson was elected to the Berkeley City Council in 2018 at age 22, becoming the youngest councilmember in the city's history. Robinson represented District 7, which encompasses UC Berkeley, Telegraph Avenue, and surrounding neighborhoods.

On the Berkeley City Council, Robinson was a vocal advocate for increased housing production. Robinson led the city council in committing to end single-family zoning, which originated in Berkeley, and was an outspoken supporter of UC Berkeley's student housing and permanent supportive housing project at People's Park. Robinson led the upzoning of his own city council district, which was approved in 2023, to dramatically accelerate construction of new housing in the neighborhoods around UC Berkeley.

Robinson was a supporter of public transit and active transportation projects and represented the City of Berkeley on the Alameda County Transportation Commission. Robinson led calls for the construction of a new car-free public plaza on Telegraph Avenue, was a consistent supporter of new bike lanes and pedestrian safety improvements, and secured funding for the design of the planned Berkeley ferry terminal. The Southside Complete Streets project, a $16.5 million redesign of Southside's streets to build protected bike infrastructure and dedicated bus lanes, was designed, funded, and constructed during Robinson's tenure.

In 2019, Robinson attracted national attention when he rejected an invitation to appear on Tucker Carlson's show on Fox News. In an email exchange with Tucker Carlson's booker, Robinson referred to the talk show host as a "white supremacist goblin."

During the 2020 George Floyd protests, the City of Berkeley attracted national attention in response to Robinson's proposal to develop alternative response models to respond to low-level traffic violations.

In 2022, Robinson introduced and passed the "Keep Innovation in Berkeley" initiative, legislation that enacted zoning changes to simplify permitting for startups and research and development laboratories in Berkeley.

Robinson was re-elected in 2022 without opposition.

In 2023, Robinson announced his candidacy for mayor of Berkeley to succeed Jesse Arreguin, and was considered a front-runner in the race.

In January 2024, shortly after UC Berkeley closed People's Park in anticipation of the construction of student housing and permanent supportive housing at the site, Robinson announced his decision to step down from the city council and suspend his mayoral campaign, citing harassment, stalking, and threats from opponents of the proposed project.
