= Associated Students, Chico =

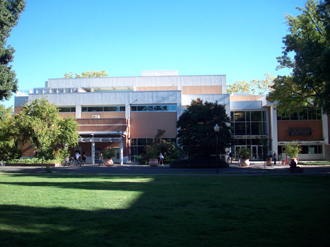
- The Bell Memorial Union student union is the headquarters of Associated Students, Chico
- Abbreviation: AS. Chico
- Formation: 1942
- Headquarters: 548 West Second Street, Chico, California, United States 95929-0750
- Members: 17,488
- President: Breanna Holbert
- Executive Vice President: Jennifer Mendoza
- Vice President of Business and Finance: Austin Lapic
- Vice President of Facilities and Services: Kaylee Biedermann
- Key people: Jamie Clyde, Executive Director, Jon Slaughter, Director of AS Programs and Government Affairs
- Main organ: Board of Directors
- Affiliations: CSSA, AOA, and ACUI
- Website: aschico.com

Associated Students, Chico (AS.) is the student government at California State University, Chico. With assets of over $19 million and annual revenue over $20 million, Associated Students, Chico is one of the largest non-profit organizations in Northern California Associated Students, Chico is a 501(c)(3) nonprofit public-benefit corporation with 17,488 members. The organization owns and operates several student services on-campus including all vending machines, and foodservices, as well as the campus bookstore. The students of CSU Chico also own their own student union building named the Bell Memorial Union which houses the Marketplace Cafe, the AS Bookstore, and the student government offices.

The Associated Students Bylaws provide that student officers are elected annually from among and by the students. Students are assessed a mandatory Activity Fee at registration which funds the student government and other programs.

The AS. is generally divided into three areas, each the responsibility of one of three Associated Students standing committees. The AS' role as a government is manifested in the Government Affairs Committee. The student union is administered under the original authority of the Bell Memorial Union Committee. The administration of the businesses is under the original authority of the Business Committee. All of these areas are under the ultimate authority of the AS Board of Directors.

Associated Students, Chico is a dues paying member of the California State Student Association, the Auxiliary Organizations Association, and the Association of College Unions International .

== Board of directors ==
The Associated Students Board of Directors is composed of the four elected student executives, the two elected student directors, one faculty member jointly appointed by the AS and the university president, and two university vice presidents. All activity of the organization is ultimately under the direction of the board. Any action of any of the three standing committees of the board may be overturned only by a 2/3+1 vote of the board.

== Student government ==
The students of CSUC are represented on campus and in the community by the student government. The AS President is elected annually and generally supervises all elected and appointed officers. The Government Affairs Committee comprises the elected student officers. In fall 2014, the Student Academic Senate was established under the Government Affairs Committee to provide for college specific representation.

=== Executives, Directors and Commissioners ===
- President, Breanna Holbert
- Executive Vice President, Jennifer Mendoza
- Vice President of Business and Finance, Austin Lapic
- Vice President of Facilities and Services, Kaylee Biedermann
- Director of University Affairs, Ella Snyder
- Director of Legislative Affairs, Anthony Ruiz
- Commissioner of Sustainability Affairs, Nick Blackwell
- Commissioner of Diversity Affairs, Logan Lee
- Commissioner of Community Affairs, Kiley Kirkpatrick
- Commissioner of Student Organizations and Resources, Vacant

=== Student Academic Senators ===
- College of Engineering, Computer Science, and Construction Management, Vacant
- College of Agriculture, Michelle Borges
- College of Behavioral and Social Sciences, Emily Bruns
- College of Business, Mattea Bertain
- College of Communication and Education, Caitlin Morris
- College of Humanities and Fine Arts, Taryn Burns
- College of Natural Sciences, Nirvana Almada

=== Councils & Committees ===
- Government Affairs Committee
- Bell Memorial Union Committee
- Associated Students Business Committee
- Sustainability Fund Allocation Committee
- Student Academic Senate
- Legislative Affairs Committee
- Sustainability Affairs Council
- Community Affairs Council
- Diversity Affairs Council
- Town & Gown Committee
- Event and Diversity Programming Allocation Council

=== Activity Fee funded programs ===
- Child Development Lab
- Gender and Sexuality Equity Coalition
- Community Legal Information Clinic
- KCSC Radio
- Community Action Volunteers in Education (CAVE)
- AS Productions
- AS Sustainability
- AS Recycling
- Freshman Leadership Opportunity(FLO)

== Student union ==
There are several programs run by the students, under the original jurisdiction of the AS Bell Memorial Union Committee.

=== Recreation programs ===
- Adventure Outings
- Wildcat Recreation Center

=== Services ===
- Conference Services
- Information Center
- 3rd Floor Art Gallery
- Computer Lab
- Facilities

== Student businesses ==
There are several commercial enterprises run by the students, under the original jurisdiction of the AS Businesses Committee.

=== AS Bookstore ===
- Clothing/Gifts/Supplies
- Computers
- Convenience Store
- General Books
- Textbook Operations
- Shipping/Receiving
- Cashiering
- Store Systems
- E-Commerce
- Customer Service

=== AS Dining Services ===
- Butte Station
- Holt Station
- Catering
- Concessions/Vending
- Residence Hall Dining
- Common Grounds
- Creekside Coffee
- Union Marketplace Café

== Organizational administration ==
- Financial Services
- Human Resources
- Information Technology
