= University of California student regent =

Student regent of the University of California
- Seal of the University of California
- Incumbent; Miguel Craven since July 1, 2026
- Member of: Regents of the University of California
- Nominator: Regents' Special Committee to Select a Student Regent
- Appointer: Regents of the University of California
- Term length: One year; preceded by approx. one-year term as Regent-designate
- Constituting instrument: Constitution of California; Bylaws of the Regents of the University of California
- Formation: 1975
- First holder: Carol Mock
- Salary: Two-year full tuition waiver or scholarship
- Website: regents.universityofcalifornia.edu/about/members-and-advisors/student-regent.html

The student regent is a position on the University of California Board of Regents created by a 1974 California ballot proposition, Proposition 4, to represent University of California (UC) students on the university system's governing board. Student regents serve an approximately one-year term as Regent-designate, followed by a one-year term as a full voting member of the Regents. For the 2026-27 term, the student regent is Miguel Craven, a UC Merced alumnus and current graduate student at UC Davis. Jordan Roiland, a medical student at the UC Berkeley - UCSF Joint Medical Program was appointed as the 2026-27 Regent-designate.

== Selection process ==
Virtually any UC student in good academic standing may apply to be student regent. Student government officials from all of the university system's campuses interview 6 to 8 semifinalists chosen out of the applicant pool by an annual systemwide student commission. The group of officials selects 3 to 5 finalists, who are then interviewed by the Board of Regents’ Special Committee to Select a Student Regent. If the committee does not reject the slate of prospective nominees, it recommends one of the finalists to the full board of University of California Regents, which then votes on the nomination. Once approved, the nominee becomes Student Regent-designate, shadowing the student regent for approximately one academic year until the beginning of their formal, year-long term on July 1 of the next year.

Prior to a 2018 policy revision, southern and northern regional UC student nominating commissions selected ten semifinalists from those who applied. The first round of interviews was conducted by the University of California Student Association (UCSA) board of directors, who nominated three finalists to the special committee.

Traditionally, the position alternates between undergraduate and graduate students as well as between the various UC campuses. However, some students involved in the selection process have said it may be biased towards graduate students, as well as towards students from UCLA and UC Berkeley, traditionally considered the flagship campuses of the UC system.

== History ==
=== Early history ===
The Board of Regents has had a student Regent, each appointed for a one-year term, since 1975 as a result of a 1974 State Constitutional amendment allowing for the position.

Master Plan for Higher Education

In 1973, the Joint Committee on the Master Plan for Higher Education issued its report containing over fifty recommendations. Recommendation 7 offered six proposed changes to the structure of the UC Board of Regents including, a peer-selected faculty member and peer-selected student shall be non-voting members, with the right of full participation. The Joint Committee's report stated that a governing board must have credibility with its constituency. In higher education students and faculty are a part of that community. Therefore, one student and one faculty member, each peer-selected, should be added to the three statewide boards and each community college district board.

At meetings of the advisory group of Regents on the Master Plan for Higher Education held on March 6 and 30, 1973, it was proposed that the Regents’ Advisory Group oppose Recommendation 7. Changes in the Board's membership would require a constitutional amendment, which, when discussed in the Legislature, would raise other issues which would threaten the independence of the University.

It was noted that the Student Body President's Council and the Student Lobby were very much in favor of having some type of student representation on the Board. It was also felt that there would be considerable support for the recommendation in the Legislature. Regent Carter and Regent DeWitt Higgs raised concern about Regents representing specific constituencies. Assemblyman John Vasconcellos responded that partly because of such concerns raised, the Joint Committee would recommend that the student and faculty representatives not be voting members of the Board.

Constitutional Amendment

Legislation calling for a constitutional amendment to Article IX, Section 9 of the State Constitution relating to membership, terms and method of selection of the Regents was adopted. In November 1974, the constitutional amendment was approved by the voters. The approved amendment (Proposition 4) included the following language:

"the members of the board may, in their discretion, following procedures established by them and after consultation with representatives of faculty and students of the university, including appropriate officers of the academic senate and student governments, appoint to the board either or both of the following persons as members with all rights of participation: a member of the faculty at a campus of the university or of another institution of higher education; a person enrolled as a student at a campus of the university for each regular academic term during his service as a member of the board. Any person so appointed shall serve for not less than one year commencing on July 1."

Implementation

The implementation of this amendment was referred to the Board's Special Committee on Reorganization. At its meeting on December 10, 1974, the Special Committee heard from Larry Miles, President of the Student Body President's Council (SBPC), who stated that there was strong student interest in having a student Regent. He hoped that the relationship of the SBPC and the Board, whereby the SBPC had the opportunity to articulate their views as advocates of student issues, would continue if a student Regent were appointed. When asked what a student Regent might be expected to contribute to the operation of an institution the magnitude of the University, Miles responded that a student Regent could give new direction and perspective on subjects with which he is particularly familiar, such as student financial aid and affirmative action. Miles submitted a proposed Student Regent Selection Procedure for consideration by The Regents.

At the Special Committee's meeting of January 15, 1975, General Counsel further advised that the Political Reform Act of 1974 would not preclude a University student from serving as a Regent, although the student Regent, if a recipient of $250 or more of student financial aid in the preceding twelve months, would be required to refrain from participating in financial aid matters affecting him.

Regents then questioned Miles on the selection process which had been proposed by the SBPC. A nominating committee of one graduate and one undergraduate student from each campus was part of the proposal. The original proposal called for one candidate to be nominated; however, the SBPC agreed to amend this to provide that three finalists be nominated for final selection by the Board.

SBPC members again submitted statements endorsing the concept of a student Regent. Miles stated that while the SBPC is the student representative, the student Regent would act as a trustee. There would be no affiliation between the SBPC and the student Regent. Miles noted that according to research, twenty-four boards in twenty states had a total of thirty-four student members. He also suggested that the Board should at least try having a student Regent for a year. At the end of the year the Regents would have the opportunity to decide again whether the experiment was a success.

The Special Committee met again in February 1975, at which time two proposals for the appointment of a student Regent were presented. The first proposal recommended that, on an experimental basis for a two-year period, a student be appointed to the Board of Regents. The appointment was to be by the Board upon the recommendation of a special committee of the Board appointed for that purpose. The special committee was to make its recommendation from a panel of three names submitted by the SBPC.

Two nominating commissions, one from the four northern campuses and one from the five southern campuses, would be established with one graduate and one undergraduate representative from each campus. Four candidates from the northern commission and five from the southern commission would be selected to be interviewed by the SBPC. From these nine candidates, three nominees would be selected.

The alternative proposal recommended a student Regent be appointed by the Board upon the recommendation of a joint Regents-students committee.

Regents’ Concerns

Regent Watkins felt that, while it was desirable that communications between Regents and students be improved, he was concerned that the appointment of a student Regent and a faculty representative to the Board in effect would downgrade the chancellors, who are the leaders of the campuses. Regent Wilson agreed with Regent Watkins and offered as a substitute motion that a student representative be appointed to attend all meetings and to be seated at the meeting table with all rights and privileges of participation other than voting. Regents Coblentz and Dutton disagreed with these suggestions, stating that the intent of Proposition 4 was that there be a student Regent.

Regent Smith reiterated earlier concerns that, because of the manner of the selection and realities of relationships, a student Regent, in effect, becomes an extension of a student organization. He felt that the proposed selection process was contrary to Proposition 4 because it delegated the selection function to a student government organization. The students, Regent Smith said, have stated that one of the criteria for selection of a candidate would be familiarity with campus issues and the position taken with respect to those issues. That, he said, is inconsistent with the function of a trustee. Regent Dutton believed it was important that a selection procedure be adopted under which the student Regent would have credibility with the student community and would not be stigmatized by the manner in which they were brought to the Board.

President Hitch commented that he had approached the subject with the same point of view as Regent Smith, but his conclusion concerning that proposal was just the opposite in that it assures that the student Regent will be a trustee. The nominee could not be an officer of the student government. Also, he would be selected by an outgoing SBPC and not the Council serving during the tenure of the student Regent.

Procedures Adopted

The first proposal to appoint a student Regent on an experimental basis for two years was recommended for approval by the Special Committee. The full Board discussed the recommendation at its February 1975 meeting, with several Regents expressing their opposition to appointing a student Regent. Amendments to the procedure for selecting the student Regent were offered, including conducting the interviews of the three nominees in open session and allowing two students from the SBPC to sit as ex officio members of the special committee. Governor Brown, who endorsed the appointment of a student Regent, suggested the following amendment to the recommendation before the Board:

"The Chair of the Student Body President's Council shall sit as an ex officio member of the special committee with all rights and privileges except voting."

This amendment was adopted, as was the recommendation of the Special Committee on Reorganization.

At its March 1975 meeting the Special Committee on Reorganization considered a proposal concerning the seating of the student Regent-designate. The proposal, after some amendment, stated that from the time of appointment of a student Regent, but prior to commencement of service as a member of the Board, the person so appointed shall be known as a Regent-designate, shall be invited to attend all meetings, shall be seated at the table with full participation in discussion and debate, and shall be entitled to reimbursement for expenses incurred. After discussion, which centered mainly on the fact that with the student Regent-designate and Alumni Regents-designate, also new additions to the Board, the number of people at the table was getting rather large, this proposal was recommended to the Board and adopted by the Regents in March 1975.

First Student Regent

In June 1975, the Regents appointed the first student Regent, Carol Mock.

At the June 1976 meeting of the Board, Student Regent Mock, in expressing her appreciation for the opportunity to serve with the Board, said that she felt the position of student Regent was of value to the Board as well as to the students. Regent Forbes recalled that the procedures for appointment of a student Regent approved by the Board required that during the second year the Regents would decide whether to continue to appoint a student Regent and, if so, would review the adequacy and appropriateness of the selection procedures. It was his understanding that the students had some changes to propose. This review was again delegated to the Special Committee on Reorganization. President Saxon told the Special Committee at its December 1976 meeting that the presence of a student at the Board table has provided new insights and information and a new type of resource to the Board. He felt that the policy should continue on an experimental basis, but for a five-year period. He also felt that it was important to identify the student Regent earlier in the year, by January, so the appointee would have a longer time as student Regent-designate.

Former student Regent Mock noted that the student Regent can function as a trustee if someone else is present to represent the students, that representative being the SBPC. With respect to the selection process, Miss Mock favored the procedure whereby the SBPC submitted three nominees to the Regents. She considered it appropriate that a student body president would not be eligible for appointment as a student Regent, but she recommended that the procedures be amended to make eligible all other elected student government officials. She agreed, however, that after appointment, no student Regent should be permitted to hold a student government position.

The Special Committee recommended to the Board that the appointment of a student Regent be continued on an experimental basis for five more years. The procedures for selection remained basically the same, with the provision added that the Special Committee on Selection of a Student Regent complete its deliberations and submit its recommendations to the Board no later than the January meeting of the Board. Rather than preclude any elected student government official from applying, the amended procedures stated that a student body president, or equivalent, or a member of the SBPC shall not be eligible for appointment as a student Regent. While serving on the Board, a student Regent may not hold any appointive or elective student government position. A student who is serving or has served as a student Regent shall not be eligible for reappointment as a student Regent. The Board of Regents approved this recommendation in January 1977.

The Regents also approved the recommendation, which at had been discussed during the review of the student Regent selection procedures, that the Secretary of The Regents, through the appropriate Chancellor, arrange for the provision of administrative support service for student Regents.

In October 1977, the procedures were amended to provide that the Special Committee to Select a Student Regent submit its recommendations to the Board no later than the February meeting of the Board. This amendment was made, with the concurrence of the SBPC, to allow for more time in the selection process.

Review and Refinement

In accordance with the Regents action of January 1977, the Board reviewed the continuation of the appointment of student Regents in 1981. This issue was delegated to the Special Committee on Regents Procedures. The Special Committee recommended that the appointment of a student Regent be continued, commencing July 1, 1982, in accordance with procedures and conditions adopted in 1977 and as subsequently amended. The Board adopted this recommendation at its September 18, 1981 meeting.

The Special Committee on Regents Procedures considered amendments to the selection procedure in January 1983 at the request of the SBPC. The amendments provided that one candidate=s name be forwarded to The Regents from the SBPC. If the candidate was not accepted by the Special Committee, the SBPC would forward one additional name. The proposal also made the student Regent a permanent ex officio member of the Presidential Selection Committees. These proposals were discussed only by the Special Committee and not recommended for action by the Board.

In June 1984, President Gardner recommended to the Special Committee on Regents Procedures that the appointment of a student Regent be continued until 1988, with several amendments to the selection procedure. Among the proposed amendments were that all University fees and tuition be waived for the student Regent during the academic year in which he or she serves and that if the Regents were to find none of the three candidates for student Regent acceptable, the SBPC may be requested to submit one or more additional names.

Another addition to the procedure in 1984 gave the responsibilities of recruitment activities for the student Regent position to the chancellors. This had been previously left to the SBPC. Since this 1984 procedure has been in effect, the number of applicants has increased significantly.

Vice President Frazer explained that the proposed amendments were the result of study by his staff, in consultation with the SBPC. He stated that the most controversial proposal was that calling for additional names of nominees if the first panel proved to be unacceptable to the Regents. After some discussion, during which a representative of the SBPC expressed opposition to this proposal, these amendments to the procedure were recommended by the Special Committee and adopted by the Board at its July 1984 meeting.

The Regents Bylaw 14.6, concerning public meetings and closed sessions of the Board, was amended by The Regents in November 1984. This amendment incorporated provisions of AB 3362, a bill amending the Education Code specifying certain conditions under which the Board may conduct closed sessions. Included in the amended Bylaw is the provision that Committees of The Regents may conduct closed sessions held for the purpose of proposing a student Regent.

It was explained by General Counsel Reidhaar that, while the previous year the meeting of the Special Committee to Select a Student Regent had been held in open session, prior to that closed sessions were permitted for the purpose of selecting the student Regent. Under the new law, the Committee would be permitted to meet entirely in closed session. Regent Andelson noted that he and other members of the Special Committee had worked closely with legislators and supported the language of the bill. The Regents approved the amendment to the Bylaws.

In July 1987, the Regents approved the continuation of the appointment of a student Regent through July 1993. No changes were made to the selection process at that time.

At the January 1993 meeting of the Special Committee to Select a Student Regent, at which the three finalists for student Regent were interviewed, it was suggested that the Policy on Selection of a Student Regent be revised by removing the requirement that the practice of appointing a Student Regent be reviewed every five years. It was the consensus of the Special Committee that such a revision would reflect the Board's ongoing commitment to the appointment of student Regents. This revision was recommended by the Special Committee on Regents Procedures and approved by the Board in March 1993.

Advisory Committee Review

In 1996, at the request of the Regents, President Atkinson convened an advisory committee whose membership included two Regents, a chancellor, a former student regent, and student representatives, to review the student Regent selection process. The committee was chaired by Carol Mock; its report and recommendations were presented to the Regents in July 1997. Although the only policy change that resulted from the committees review was to change the month of appointment of the student Regent from February to March, several procedural recommendations were adopted with the recruitment for the 1998-99 student Regent These included lengthening the time line for the recruitment period to allow more time for the students to apply and for the screening and interview processes, and providing a cumulative evaluation of the applicants as they move through the steps of selection. It was the consensus that, although the selection process should remain a confidential one, it would be beneficial to keep the chancellors apprised of the status of applicants from their campuses. The committee also recommended that the President appoint a committee in two to three years to evaluate the process and make further recommendations for change as necessary.

As recommended by the 1996 advisory committee, in 1999 President Atkinson appointed a second advisory committee to review the student Regent selection process. The committee was charged with revisiting three issues put forward by the 1996 committee: 1) the length of the term of the student Regent, 2) the issue of submitting one finalist to the Regents instead of three, and 3) opening the selection process to members of the public. At the request of recent student Regents, a fourth issue was added to the committees charge - the provision of more administrative and financial support for the student Regent. The committee included Regents, a former student Regent, a chancellor, a faculty member and a student body president. In its recommendations the advisory committee responded to each of its four charges. It recommended that current policy be maintained in which UCSA (formerly SBPC) submits three finalists to the Regents. It also recommended that rather than extending the one-year term of the student Regent, the period the nominee serves as a designate would be extended through earlier recruitment and appointment dates. In addition it was recommended that the student Regents fees be waived during the designate period as well as during his or her voting term. These recommendations were adopted as policy amendments by the Regents in June 1999.

Further Policy Amendments

In 2000, the state Legislature passed Senate Concurrent Resolution 89, intended to “recognize, commend, and celebrate the contributions of the office of the Student Regent of the University of California, and of the twenty-five students who have held the office over its life.

The Regents Policy on Appointment of a Student Regent was amended again in November 2002 to change the fee waiver for the student Regent to a scholarship to benefit student Regents and designates who otherwise qualify for financial aid which will already pay their fees. In May 2004, the appointment date of the student Regent was changed from the September Regents meeting to the July meeting, allowing the student to serve longer as a Regent-designate. In September 2005, the policy was once again amended to accommodate UC Merced in the recruitment process, increasing the number of semifinalists increased from nine to ten.

=== Modern History ===
Student regents have been noted for their support of affirmative action and diversity, and opposition of nuclear weapons research and fee increases.

In May 2011, student regent Jesse Cheng resigned after being arrested for allegedly committing sexual battery against a UCLA graduate student. Cheng was found responsible for "unwanted touching" by UC Irvine's student conduct office, but the Orange County District Attorney declined to file charges against him. The student regent-designate at the time, Alfredo Mireles, was appointed voting student regent after Cheng's resignation.

In 2013, the nomination of Sadia Saifuddin, the first Muslim student regent, was criticized by pro-Israel and conservative entities, such as StandWithUs and David Horowitz, due to Saifuddin's past support for disinvestment from Israel. In the final vote to appoint Saifuddin, only Regent Richard C. Blum abstained from voting in favor. Regent Norman Pattiz was not present at the time of the vote. During June 2013, student regent Jonathan Stein was a member of the Regents committee that selected Janet Napolitano to be nominated and presented to the full Board of Regents for a confirmation vote.

In 2014, the appointment of Saifuddin's successor, Avi Oved, was opposed by students and student groups, including Students for Justice in Palestine, due to conflict of interest and transparency concerns. The Daily Californian reported that when running for an elected student government position at UCLA, Oved received campaign donations from Israeli-American businessman Adam Milstein that were secretly routed through Hillel's UCLA chapter. Oved and his supporters responded that UCLA's student government election regulations did not require disclosure of donors, and that the opposition was motivated by anti-Semitism. The UC Student Association nominating committee voted to delay its nomination of Oved in order to fully investigate, but the Board of Regents rejected the delay and voted to appoint Oved, with only Saifuddin voting in opposition.

In January 2016, Oved and his successor, Marcela Ramirez, attended costly Regents' dinners paid for by university funds. The dinners were criticized by state legislative leaders, government watchdog groups, student government leaders, and students at large. The dinners appeared to violate university policy, and after The San Francisco Chronicle publicly reported the dinners' existence and funding, university leaders said they would no longer pay for the dinners.

In May 2016, UC Berkeley Law student Paul Monge Rodriguez was nominated to be student regent for the 2017-2018 academic year. Monge previously criticized Berkeley's discipline of then-law dean Sujit Choudhry for sexual harassment, calling it a "slap on the wrist".

=== Representation of the Student Regent ===
Student Regents are typically found to be highly representative of the student population ethnically, but are disproportionate in campus diversity. There are significantly more graduate students serving on the board in recent years. There are few instances of two women-identifying students being chosen back to back. There have been significant strides in recent years, such as Regent Muwwakkil, the first student regent to have been a transfer student. Regent Zaragoza, the first student regent to have been a transfer student while still in undergraduate as well as having served previously on the California Community Colleges Board of Governors. Zaragoza was also the second ever Native American to have served on the board, second to Jacquelyn Ross (1987-88). Regent Blas-Pedral worked and went to school at three separate UC's. Regent Tesfai was the first student parent to have served as a student regent. Regent Beharry holds the honor of being the first DACA recipient and student from UC Merced to serve on the Board of Regents. Regent-designate Brooks holds the distinction of being the first African American woman to serve as a Student Regent.

== List of student regents ==
List of student regents
No.	Student regent	Term as regent	Campus	Academic level during term	Major or field of study during term
1	Carol Mock	1975–1976	Santa Barbara	senior	political science
2	Daryn Peeples	1976–1977	Berkeley	senior	English
3	Michael S. Salerno	1977–1978	Davis	graduate	law
4	Renee Turkell	1978–1979	Los Angeles	senior	English
5	Hector C. Lozano	1979–1980	Davis	senior	sociology
6	Leslie K. Lurie	1980–1981	Los Angeles	junior	political science & communications
7	David A. Neuman	1981–1982	Los Angeles	junior	communications studies
8	Linda Rae Sabo	1982–1983	San Diego	senior	philosophy
9	Richard Anderson	1983–1984	Los Angeles	graduate	psychology
10	Fred N. Gaines	1984–1985	Berkeley	graduate	law
11	Janice C. Eberly	1985–1986	Davis	junior	agricultural economics
12	David B. Hoffman	1986–1987	Los Angeles	sophomore	political science
13	Jacquelyn Ross	1987–1988	Davis	senior	applied behavioral science
14	Deborah Thorpe	1988–1989	Davis	junior	chemistry
15	Guillermo Rodriguez	1989–1990	Berkeley	junior	sociology & communications
16	Jenny Doh	1990–1991	Irvine	senior	political science
17	Diana Darnell	1991–1992	San Francisco	graduate	anatomy
18	Alex Wong	1992–1993	Berkeley	graduate	law
19	Darby Morrisroe	1993–1994	Davis	senior	political science
20	Terrence Wooten	1994–1995	Riverside	senior	biology
21	Edward Gomez	1995–1996	Riverside	graduate	history
22	Jess Bravin	1996–1997	Berkeley	graduate	law
23	Kathryn McClymond	1997–1998	Santa Barbara	graduate	religious studies
24	Max R. Espinoza	1998–1999	Los Angeles	senior	political science & Chicano studies
25	Michelle K. Pannor	1999–2000	Berkeley	senior	conservation resources
26	Justin W. Fong	2000–2001	Los Angeles	graduate	public policy
27	Tracy M. Davis	2001–2002	Los Angeles	graduate	higher education & organizational change
28	Dexter Ligot-Gordon	2002–2003	Berkeley	graduate	
29	Matthew Murray	2003–2004	Irvine	graduate	
30	Jodi Anderson	2004–2005	Los Angeles	graduate	higher education
31	Adam Rosenthal	2005–2006	Davis	graduate	law
32	María Ledesma	2006–2007	Los Angeles	graduate	higher education
33	Ben Allen	2007–2008	Berkeley	graduate	law
34	D’Artagnan Scorza	2008–2009	Los Angeles	graduate	education studies
35	Jesse Bernal	2009–2010	Santa Barbara	graduate	education studies
36	Jesse Cheng	2010–2011 May (resigned)	Irvine	undergraduate	
37	Alfredo Mireles Jr.	2011 May – 2012	San Francisco	graduate	
38	Jonathan Stein	2012–2013	Berkeley	graduate	Master's & law
39	Cinthia Flores	2013–2014	Irvine	graduate	law
40	Sadia Saifuddin	2014–2015	Berkeley	undergraduate	
41	Abraham "Avi" Oved	2015–2016	Los Angeles	undergraduate	economics
42	Marcela Ramirez	2016–2017	Riverside	graduate	higher education administration and policy
43	Paul Monge Rodriguez	2017–2018	Berkeley	graduate	law
44	Devon Graves	2018–2019	Los Angeles	graduate	higher education
45	Haley Weddle	2019–2020	San Diego	graduate	higher education
46	Jamaal Muwwakkil	2020–2021	Santa Barbara	graduate	linguistics
47	Alexis Atsilvsgi Zaragoza	2021–2022	Berkeley	undergraduate	geography
48	Marlenee Blas Pedral	2022–2023	Berkeley	graduate	law
49	Merhawi Tesfai	2023–2024	Los Angeles	graduate	social welfare
50	Josiah Beharry	2024–2025	Merced	graduate	interdisciplinary humanities
51	Sonya Brooks	2025–2026	Los Angeles	graduate	education and community health sciences
52	Miguel Craven	2026–2027	Davis	graduate	energy systems
