= University of California Student Association =

Statewide student association of the University of California

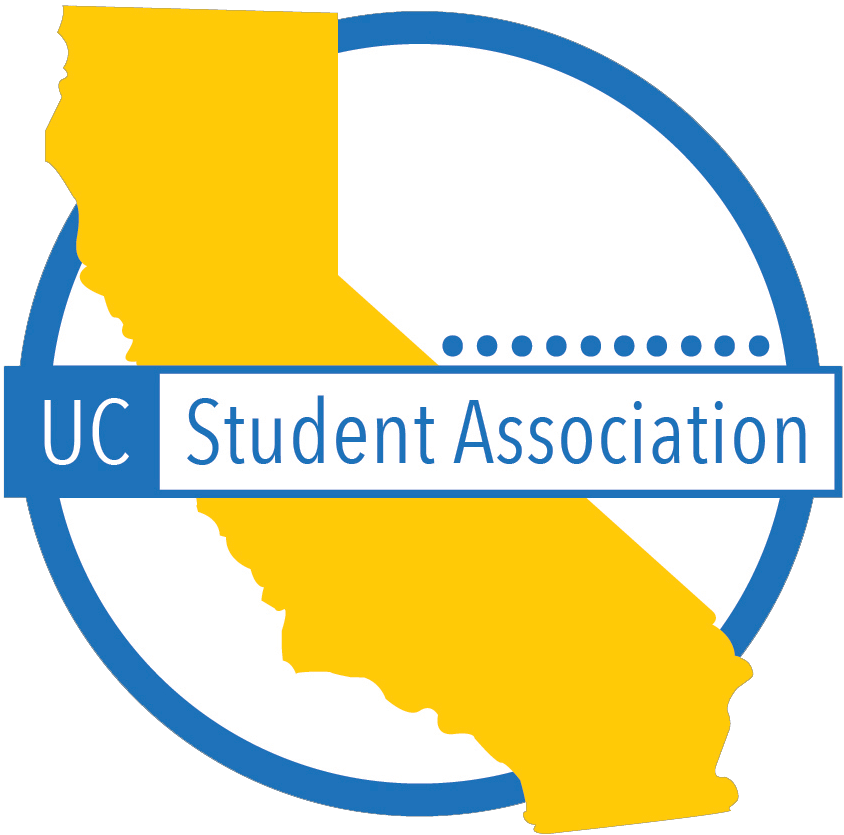
- Abbreviation: UCSA
- Founded: February 11, 1971
- Type: Unincorporated association
- Tax ID no.: 94-2911063
- Purpose: Student association
- Location(s): 385 Grand Ave, Suite 302 Oakland, California, 94610 (main office); 1020 12th Street, Suite 232 Sacramento, California, 95814 (legislative office)
- President: Aditi Hariharan
- Chair: Rony Garcia
- Treasurer: Timothy Schoonover
- Vice Chair: Vacant
- Board of directors: 8 voting members (External Vice Presidents of each UC campus' External Vice Presidents), plus up to 4 non-voting members per campus
- Affiliations: United States Student Association
- Staff: 5 full-time professional staff members formally employed by the University of California; Student interns
- Website: https://ucsa.org/
- Formerly called: Council of Student Body Presidents

The University of California Student Association (UCSA) is an active 501(c)(3) federation of University of California (UC) undergraduate students' associations, purposed as a student association of all UC students. Its charter states that it "shall exist to: serve the interests of the current and future students of the University of California and promotes [sic] cooperation between various student governments of the University and student organizations concerned with higher education." The Association is not a public agency, but its leadership is composed of representatives of UC student governments, which are "official units of the University" system (with the exception of the UC Berkeley Associated Students). UCSA participates in various aspects of the UC system's governance, notably including the selection of the student representative on the UC Board of Regents.

UCSA representatives have opposed education funding cuts and increases in student fees and supported affirmative action in enrollment policies. The association mobilizes students via voter registration campaigns; it recorded 26,000 new voter registrations in 2006, and added 12,300 new registrations in 2008 for the California Democratic and Republican primaries. In April 2016, UCSA called for the removal of then-chancellor of UC Davis, Linda Katehi. In January and October 2017, UCSA called for the removal of Norman Pattiz, a UC Regent, due to sexual harassment allegations that Pattiz has admitted to.

== Governance ==
UCSA's governing body is its board of directors, which is chartered to be made up of the external vice presidents of all UC student governments. However, UCSA generally requires each student government to pay dues to maintain voting rights on the board. Thus, student governments may effectively "withdraw" from UCSA by refusing to pay dues.

In May 2017, the UCSA board of directors included voting members from 18 student governments. That number dropped to 11 in 2018 because a number of professional and graduate student governments withdrew from UCSA and formed a separate organization named "University of California Graduate and Professional Council".

As of January 2025, the UCSA board of directors included voting members from the following student governments:

- Associated Students of the University of California (UC Berkeley)
- Associated Students, UC Davis (previously withdrew in 2006)
- Associated Students, UC Irvine (previously withdrew in 2014)
- Undergraduate Students Association Council (UCLA)
- Associated Students of UC Merced
- Associated Students of UC Riverside
- UC San Diego Associated Students
- Associated Students of UC Santa Barbara
- Student Union Assembly (UC Santa Cruz)

== Student regent selection ==
The UC student Council of Presidents annually selects a cohort of semifinalists. These semifinalists are then interviewed by the UCSA board of directors. The board chooses three applicants, who are then interviewed by a special Regents' committee. The committee then recommends a nominee to the full board of University of California Regents.

== See also ==
- African Black Coalition
- California State Student Association
- National Association of Graduate-Professional Students
- Student Senate for California Community Colleges
- United States Student Association
