= Associated Students of the University of California =

Student association of UC Berkeley

- Abbreviation: ASUC
- Formation: March 2, 1887; 139 years ago
- Type: Student association
- Legal status: 501(c)(3) organization
- Headquarters: 412 Eshleman Hall, Berkeley, California
- Location: University of California, Berkeley
- President: Abigail Verino
- Executive Vice President: Isha Chander
- Affiliations: University of California Student Association
- Budget: $1,678,558
- Website: asuc.org

The Associated Students of the University of California (ASUC) is the autonomous and officially recognized students' association of the University of California, Berkeley. It is the only students' association within the University of California that is fully autonomous from the university administration. Founded in 1887, the ASUC is an independent, 501(c)(3) non-profit, and unincorporated association. The ASUC controls funding for all ASUC-sponsored organizations, advocates on behalf of students to solve issues on campus and in the community, engages with administrators to develop programming, increase student-organizational resources, and increase transparency.

== History ==
The ASUC was founded on March 2, 1887. Prior to this, Berkeley had no residence halls, sport teams, or permanent student organizations. The original purpose of the ASUC was "to organize the Student Body in such wise that it might take effective action upon all matter relating to the general welfare of the student body and the University in general." The organization went on to absorb the Cal Student Store, become the center of student organization oversight, and run all university athletics until the 1960s.

Various student political parties – popularly known as "slates" – and independent student communities participate in the ASUC. SLATE, a pioneer organization of the New Left and precursor of the Free Speech Movement and formative counterculture era, was a campus political party at Cal from 1958 to 1966, while VOICE (a radical party) and Pact (a liberal party) were campus political parties at Cal in 1967.

The emergence of modern-day student political parties within the ASUC began with the formation of Student Action. Student Action, founded in 1995, formed as a coalition of organizations, including the Greek life, Pre-Law, and Engineering communities. Since its inception, Student Action served each year as the largest political faction in the ASUC, producing numerous alumni that went on to become prominent political figures at the state and federal level. Over the years, Student Action expanded their party, slating candidates each year from the South Asian, Jewish, International, and East Asian communities. After 28 years, Student Action officially announced in an Instagram post that the party would be disbanded. The controversy of student-political parties at UC Berkeley became notable during Student Action's iron grip on student elections, but it certainly did not turn away other groups of students from creating political parties of their own. SQUELCH! is a satirical party which has run and won seats in the past before suffering a major blow in the 2017 elections, when they won no seats in the senate. The Pirate Party centers their messaging on technology and humor, campaigning in pirate costumes during election season. As of the 2017 elections, they held one seat in the ASUC Senate. The Defend Affirmative Action Party (DAAP), founded by national activist and left-wing militant group BAMN, campaigns on a platform of radical racial justice and inclusion for students, though has found relatively little support, having won no seats for 9 years as of 2017. BAMN itself began at Berkeley in 1995 and ran candidates starting in 1996 under its own name, which, at the time, was The Coalition to Defend Affirmative Action By Any Means Necessary. The major parties from the late 1980s and early 1990s included: the Bears Party, drawing from a similar constituency as today's Student Action; Students for Progress, a center-left party; as well as Cal-SERVE. Minor Parties that won seats during that era included: More centrist groups like GRASP (Grass Root and Student Power), APPLE (A People's Party for Loyalty and Experience), Vision, SEED, a progressive party to the left of Cal-SERVE; Crusaders for the Rights of Undeclared and Confused Students (CRUCS), focused on initiatives to improve student life such as extending the P/NP and drop deadlines beyond the first round of midterms; the Monster Truck Party, appealing to Greek constituencies with the slogan: "what will knowledge of other cultures do if your car throws a rod 10 miles outside of Kettleman City"; the PENIS Party, with the slogan "erect a leader," and a platform advocating for more urinals and a taller Campanile; and the Science and Engineering Party, which advocated for the interests of science and engineering students and who partnered with CRUCS to win 4 executive seats between 1990 and 1992.

Today, the largest political party at UC Berkeley is ElevateCal. ElevateCal's founding values are centered around the inclusion of marginalized communities in student government and transparency within the student government. In the 2024 ASUC Election, ElevateCal won the Presidency, Vice Presidency, and 7 out of 20 Senate Seats, with Independents winning AAVP, EAVP, Student Advocate, and the other 13 seats.

== Programs and resources ==
The ASUC's responsibilities include allocating student group funding through a yearly spring budgeting process. The finance officer evaluates each club's funding request, length of time as a sponsored organization, and history of funding in order to determine how much money each registered student organization should be allocated. The ASUC budgets in excess of $1 million each year to campus organizations, including the Bridges multicultural resource & retention center.

The offices of the president and the external affairs vice president focus much of their time on student advocacy, often relating to issues of sexual assault, campus safety, student voice, mental health, equality, and diversity.

== Governance ==
The ASUC Constitution establishes a students' association with elected officials modeled after California's separation-of-powers and plural elected executive framework.

The executive officers and the Senate of the ASUC are popularly elected by single transferable vote. Chief appointed officers are non-partisan officials appointed by the Senate. The six chief appointed officials are the chief communications officer (CCO), chief financial officer (CFO), chief legal officer (CLO), chief technology officer (CTO), chief personnel officer (CPO), and chief grants & scholarships officer (CGO).

The five elected executive officers of the ASUC are the president, executive vice president (EVP), external affairs vice president (EAVP), academic affairs vice president (AAVP), and the student advocate. Political parties that compete in ASUC elections usually run candidates for the first four positions, while the fifth, student advocate, is traditionally won in a nonpartisan race by a member of the staff of the outgoing student advocate.

In 2019, the student body passed the Transfer Remedy Act ballot proposition, which added the transfer student representative as a unique ASUC office intended to represent the campus' growing transfer student population. The Transfer Student Representative is a voting ex-officio member of the ASUC Senate, serving as the de facto twenty-first member of the Senate and maintaining all of the responsibilities of a regular ASUC senator. The Transfer Student Representative is chosen a separate election using the single transferable vote mechanism. The position was on the ASUC election ballot for the first time in the spring 2020 election.

== Notable alumni ==
- Jesse Gabriel, member of the California State Assembly from the 45th district.
- Christopher Cabaldon, member of the California State Senate and former Mayor of West Sacramento, California.
- Jesse Arreguín, member of the California State Senate from the 7th district.
- Josh Fryday, former mayor of Novato, California and Chief Service Officer, State of California.
- Nick Pacheco, member of the Los Angeles City Council from the 14th district (1999-2003).
- José Huizar, member of the Los Angeles City Council from the 14th district (2005-2020).
- Rigel Robinson, member of the Berkeley, California City Council from the 7th district (2018-2024).
- Pedro Noguera, Dean, USC Rossier School of Education.
- Wally Adeyemo, Deputy Secretary of the Treasury; inaugural president of the Obama Foundation.
- Leigh Steinberg, American sports agent.
- Ki Hong Lee, American actor.
- John Cho, Korean American Actor.

== List of Executive Officers ==
Years	President	Executive Vice President	Academic Affairs Vice President	External Affairs Vice President	Student Advocate
1985-1986	Pedro Noguera	Karen Licavoli	M. Bruce Robinson		Steven Ganz
1986-1987	Steven Ganz	Nicole Maguire	Tom Malinowski	Christopher Cabaldon	Matt Denn
1987-1988	Matt Denn	Julie Chang	Beth Bernstein	Michael Berry	Erica Teasley
1988-1989	Jeff Chang	Pamela Brown	Valli Israels	Tisa Poe	Pete Kennedy
1989-1990	Tisa Poe	Pamela Brown	Jan Young	Jose Huizar	Bonaparte Liu
1990-1991	Bonaparte Liu	Shahed Amanullah		Bess Dolmo	Ben Austin
1991-1992	Mark Yablonovich	Cecelia Wang			Rachel Settlage
1992-1993	Margaret Fortune	Mimi Aye	Greg Lewis	Tim Yeung	Lisa (Swartout) Zwicker
1993-1994	Marco Pulisci	Scott Kamena	Mike Young	Anny Huang	Andrew Wong
1994-1995	Andrew Wong	Alex Weingarten	Joanne Loh	Victor Martinez	Auren Hoffman
1995-1996	Jeff Cohen	Felicia Sze	Eric Higashiguchi	Esa Yu	Mark Schlosberg
1996-1997	Grant Harris	Sharon Yuan	Christina Pak	Renee Dall	Aaron Butler
1997-1998	Sharon Yuan	Lee Fink	Margie Brown	Sanjeev Bery	Hikari Kimura
1998-1999	Irami Osei Frimpong (resigned) Preston Taylor	Rishi Chandna	Amanda Canning	Shin Honma	Randolph Gaw
1999-2000	Patrick Campbell	Conor Moore	Ally McNally	Gray Chynoweth	Jen Shen
2000-2001	Teddy Liaw	Alex Ding	Jen Chang (resigned November 2000) Jose Luis Lopez (appointed December 2000)	Nick Papas	Kevin Hammon
2001-2002	Wally Adeyemo	Justin Christensen	Catherine Ahn	Josh Fryday	Alex Kipnis
2002-2003	Jesse Gabriel	Han Hong	Tony Falcone	Jimmy Bryant	Salam Rafeedie
2003-2004	Kris Cuaresma-Primm	Taina Gomez	Gustavo Mata	Anu Joshi	Dave Madan
2004-2005	Misha Leybovich	Christine Lee	Rocky Gade	Liz Hall	Dave Madan
2005-2006	Manuel Buenrostro	Anil Daryani	Jason Dixson	Sharon Han	Vikrum Aiyer
2006-2007	Oren Gabriel	Vishal Kumar Gupta	Joyce Liou	Jason Chu	
2007-2008	Van Nguyen	Taylor Allbright	Curtis Lee	Danny Montes	
2008-2009	Roxanne Winston	Krystle Pasco	Carlo De La Cruz	Dionne JIrachaikitti	Matthew David Demartini
2009-2010	Will Smelko	Tu Tran	John Tran	Dani Haber	
2011-2011	Noah Stern	Nanxi Liu	Viola Tang	Ricardo Gomez	
2011-2012	Vishalli Loomba	Chris Alabastro	Julia Joung	Joey Freeman	Samar Shah
2012-2013	Connor Landgraf	Justin Sayarath	Natalie Gavello	Shahryar Abbasi	Stacy Suh
2013-2014	Deejay Pepito	Nolan Pack	Valerie Jameson	Safeena Mecklai	Timofey Semenov
2014-2015	Pavan Upadhyayula	Justin Kong	Summer (elected): Jeanette Corona Fall (acting): Pavan Upadhyayula Fall-Spring (appointed): Mon-Shane Chou	Caitlin Quinn	Rishi Ahuja
2015-2016	Yordanos Dejen	Lavanya Jawaharlal	Melissa Hsu	Marium Navid	Leah Romm
2016-2017	William Morrow	Alicia Lau	Frances McGinley	Andre Luu	Selina Lao
2017-2018	Zaynab Abdulqadir-Morris	Helen Yuan	Andrew-Ian Bullitt	Rigel Robinson	Jillian Free
2018-2019	Alexander Wilfert	Hung Huynh	Melany Amarikwa	Nuha Khalfay	Sophie Bandarkar
2019-2020	Amma Sarkodee-Adoo	Andy Theocharous (resigned in April 2020) Nathan Mizell (appointed in April 2020)	Aastha Jha	Varsha Sarveshwar	Nava Bearson
2020-2021	Victoria Vera	Melvin Tangonan	Nicole Anyanwu	Derek Imai	Joyce Huchin
2021-2022	Chaka Tellem	Aditya Dev Varma (resigned in August 2021) Antonio Kobe Lopez (acting) Giancarlo Fernandez (appointed in September 2021)	James Weichert	Riya Master	Era Goel
2022-2023	Chaka Tellem	Giancarlo Fernandez	James Weichert	Bailey Henderson	Crystal Choi
2023-2024	Sydney Roberts	Shri Gopal	Kenneth Ng	Alexander Edgar	Ariana Kretz
2024-2025	Shri Gopal	Robert Carrillo	Kenneth Ng	Saanvi Arora	Antonio Caceres
2025-2026	Abigail Verino	Isha Chander	Jennifer Tran	Calvin Yang	Britnee Stephen
2026-2027	Margaret Solomon	Sydnee Thy	Dylan Lucks	Selina Mendez	Reena Alsakaji

== List of Senators ==
Term	Senator																			
1993-1994	Marjan	Julio Casas	Jody Weissler	Josh Switzky	Mark Siefert															
2020-2021	Alexis Aguilar	Sarah Bancroft	Julia Castro	Maddy Chen	Sheena Dichoso Echano	Naomi Joy Garcia	Will Liu	Samuel Peng	Apoorva Prakash	Sahvannah Rodriguez	Michael Savides	Ruchi Shah	Ronit Sholkoff	Rebecca Soo	Ellis Spickermann	Chaka Tellem	Mateo Torrico	Aasim Yahya	Liam Will	Rex Zhang
2021-2022	Muz Ahmad	Amy Chen	Sam Coffey	Jason Dones	Mehnaz Grewal	Amanda Hill	Varsha Madapoosi	Sophie Morris	Adrianna Ngo	Osirus Polachart	Sammy Raucher	Ashley Rehal	Isabella Romo	Dil Sen	Elif Sensurucu	Gabbi Sharp	Jerry Xu	Griselda Vega Martinez	Stephanie Wong	Kalli Zervas
2022-2023	Deena Ali	Emma Centeno	Shay Cohen	Manuel Cisneros	Shrinidi Gopal	Kailen Grottel-Brown	Yasamin Hatefi	Raymond Hufnagel	Anjali Jogia-Sattar	Mahathi Kandimalla	Deborah Kim	Joshua Lee	Tyler Mahomes	Soha Manzoor	Charles Peng	Akash Ponna	Thin Rati-Oo	Carlos Vazquez	Stephanie Wong	Megan Yao
2023-2024	Lanah Duque	Caitlyn Guntle	Kailen Grottel-Brown	Luca Hadife	Andrea Jimenez	Jose Massuh	Ayal Meyers	Ashi Mishra	Ariel Mizrahi	Sky Montogomery	Isabel Prasad	Thin Rati-Oo	Aanya Niharika Schoetz	Christine Song	Imaan Sultan	Bianca Torres	Doty	Andy Liu	Helena Wu	Sonia Zu
2024-2025	Abigail Verino	Annabel Wang	Ayden Reading	Carlos Julian Gonzalez	China Duff	Ellen Tong	Ethan Hu	Isha Chander	Jonathan Franco	Jonathan Ngai	Justin Taylor	Kaila DuFour	Kailen Grottel-Brown	Maitri Halappa	Max Rodman	Medina Danish	Owen Knapper Jr.	Shaya Keyvanfar	Tony Ordoukhanian	
2025-2026	Anamaria Abnusy	Somer Alrai	Colton Beardsley	Abigail Cho	Talia Golshani	Reg Macarro	Abdullah Memon	Selina Mendez	Nicole Nunez-Rivera	Ayden Reading	Shawn Ree	Kianna Rodarte	Bella Santos	Sydney Scott	Margaret Solomon	Lucia Stankovic	Sara Teran	Sydnee Thy	Rayne Xue	Jada Yang
2026-2027	Sandra Ding	Matthew Pitcher	Nikita Jadhav	Gabby Torres	Nicolle Aguilar	Jeffrey Lee	Joseph Karlan	Aarja Singh	Ryan Justice-Williams	Maddie Chesebro	Cece Hammond	Gurnoor Patti	Mi Tang	Ana Tovar	Karuna Gray	Tigran Aghbalyan	Omar Espinoza	Hailey Cho	Tai Cassel Engen	Emma Enríquez

== List of Appointed Officers ==
Years	Chief Communications Officer	Chief Financial Officer	Chief Legal Officer	Chief Personnel Officer	Chief Technology Officer
2019-2020	Bryan Huang	Lucy Liu	Jedidiah Tsang	Evan Cui / Ilene Kung	Leon Ming
2020-2021	Annie Pan	David Wang	Athalia Djuhana	David Zhou	Grace Luo
2021-2022 2	Nancy Kim	Soomin Kim (resigned in January 2022) Henry F. Isselbacher (Appointed in January 2022)	Mina Han (resigned in February 2022) Athalia Djuhana (acting) Stephany Su (appointed in May 2022)	David Zhou / Eliana Kim	Oscar Bjorkman
2022-2023	Ryan Barba / Jennifer Rojas	Henry F. Isselbacher	Jason Dones	Eliana Kim / Michael Moy	Saruul Amarbayar
2023-2024	Jennifer Rojas	Catherine Park	Jason Dones	Michael Moy / Riley Anderson	Vedha Santhosh
2024-2025	Lanah Duque	Nicholas Yu	Riley Anderson	Ashley Tigue / Jasmine Johnson	Sukhamrit Singh
2025-2026	Giselle Arteaga	Jonathan Ngai	Daniel Dolan	Shelby Coleman	Shlok Sooch

== See also ==
- Student governments in the United States
