= Pedro Noguera =

American sociologist and university administrator

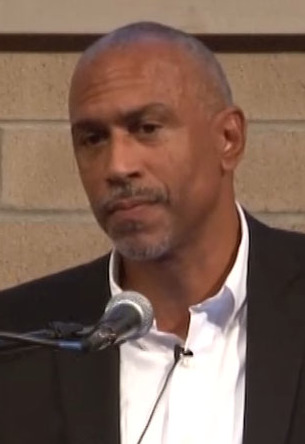
- Born: August 7, 1959 (age 67)
- Occupations: Sociologist; university administrator

Academic background
- Education: Brown University (B.A., M.A.); University of California, Berkeley (Ph.D.)

Academic work
- Institutions: USC Rossier School of Education
- Website: pedronoguera.com

Pedro Noguera (born August 7, 1959) is the Emery Stoops and Joyce King Stoops Dean of the University of Southern California's Rossier School of Education. He is recognized as a leading scholar of urban public education, equity, and school reform.

Noguera holds a B.A. and M.A. in sociology and a teaching credential from Brown University and a Ph.D. in sociology from the University of California, Berkeley.

== Books ==
=== As author ===
- The Imperatives of Power: Regime survival and the basis of political support in Grenada, 1951–1991 (1997). New York: Peter Lang Publishing, Inc.
- City Schools and the American Dream: Fulfilling the Promise of Public Education (2003). New York: Teachers College Press. Winner, Forward Magazine Award for best book in education 2003; American Association of Educational Studies, Book of the Year Award, 2004.
- (with Jean Yonomura Wing) Unfinished Business: Closing the Achievement in Our Schools (2006). San Francisco, CA: Josey Bass.
- The Trouble With Black Boys: Reflections on Race, Equity and the Future of Public Education (2008). San Francisco: Wiley and Sons. (Winner American Education Studies Association Critics Choice Award; Schott Foundation Award for Research on Race and Gender; Scholastic Publishers Award)
- (with A. Wade Boykin) Creating the Opportunity to Learning: Moving from Research to Practice to Close the Achievement Gap (2011). Washington, D.C.: Association for Supervision and Curriculum Development.
- (with Edward Fergus and Margary Martin) Schooling for Resilience: Improving Life Trajectories for Black and Latino Boys (2014). Cambridge: Harvard Education Press.
- The Schools We Need: Education, Inequality and America's Future (forthcoming). New York: New Press.

=== As editor ===
- (with Shawn Ginwright and Julio Camarota) Beyond Resistance! Youth Activism and Community Change (2006). New York: Routledge.
- (with Carlos Alberto Torres) Social Justice Education for Teachers: Paulo Freire and the Possible Dream (2008). London, UK: Sense Publishers.
- (with William Ayers, Gloria Ladson-Billings, and Gregory Mitchie) City Kids, City Schools (2008). New York: New Press.
- (with Aida Hurtado and Edward Fergus) Invisible No More: Understanding and Responding to the Disenfranchisement of Latino Males (2011). New York: Routledge.
- (with Alan Blankstein) Excellence Through Equity (2015). San Francisco: Corwin Press.
- (with Jill Pierce and Roey Ahram) Race, Equity and Education: The Pursuit of Equality in Education 60 Years After Brown (2015). New York: Springer Press.

== Awards ==
- 1997 Wellness Foundation Award for Research on Youth Violence
- 1997 University of California's Distinguished Teaching Award
- 2001 Honorary Doctorate, University of San Francisco
- 2001 Centennial Medal, Philadelphia University
- 2003 Forward Magazine Gold Award (City Schools and the American Dream)
- 2003 AESA Critics Choice Book Award (City Schools and the American Dream)
- 2005 Whitney Young Award for Leadership in Education
- 2006 Eugene Carrothers Award for Public Service
- 2008 Schott Foundation Award for Research on Race and Gender
- 2008 AESA Critics Choice Book Award (The Trouble With Black Boys)
- 2009 Scholastic Corporation Education Hero Award
- 2011 Honorary Doctorate, Bank Street College
- 2012 Honorary Doctorate, Metropolitan College of New York
- 2013 Honorary Doctorate, Lewis and Clark College, Portland Oregon
- 2013 Kappa Delta Pi Honor Society
- 2013 Martin Luther King Award for Leadership in Social Justice, New York
- 2014 National Academy of Education
- 2014 Award for Exemplary Scholarship Advanced Center for Behavioral Sciences
- 2015 National Association of Secondary School Principals for Distinguished Service to Public Education
- 2015 Horace Mann Award
- 2015 Honorary Doctorate, Duquesne University
- 2015 Honorary Doctorate, Lesley University
