= Armies of Arcana =

Armies of Arcana is a fantasy-based tabletop wargame created by Thane's Games. It is commonly played with 15mm or 28mm scale miniatures representing troops of various fantasy races and creatures.

== Gameplay ==
There are 16 core armies that can be played, including elves, dwarves, Orcs, and multiple human races, but other armies have been made "official" on the Thane's Games website. Numerous monsters are also available for any army to use in their battles.

The background for the game is largely open for individual players to customise themselves and not feel restricted by one "official" account of relations between races. This removes the common problem in miniature wargames of some pairs of players armies having no "excuse" to fight each other. However, a coordinated background development project is under way at the Armies of Arcana forum.

Although it provides 16 basic armies, Armies of Arcana was created to allow players to use any miniature they want, so a point system was created to enable players to create their own troops that could still be equally matched against existing soldiers.

== The Armies ==
=== Demons ===
The Dark Elves brought Demons to Arcana in search for allies, but their alliance soon crumbled. The demons are now stuck on Arcana with no means of getting back to their chaotic homeworld, but the demon lords seem more than happy to conquer the "lesser" races of Arcana.

=== Dwarves ===
The Dwarves are one of the oldest races of Arcana. They live underground and have managed to avoid much of the conflict on the surface, though they lost most of their magic during the Elven Mage Wars.

=== Dark Elves ===
Dark Elves believe that they are the superior race of Arcana, and thus enslave humans and orcs alike, as well as hunt lizard-men, beast-men, and goblins for sport. Captives of the lesser races are sacrificed, and many nobles engage in ritual combat with slaves.

=== High Elves ===
As the superior race of Arcana, High Elves believe it is their duty to teach and enlighten the lesser races. Thus High Elves support friendly relationships with peaceful allies, and often engage in trading with them. High elves are sea-farers, and all of their cities are coastal.

=== Sylvan Elves ===
Sylvan Elves believe that they are the defenders of Arcana. Unlike their brethren, they have abandoned the cities and now live in a natural affinity with the forests. Sylvan Elves take pride in the many kinds of plants they grow, and will willingly trade this with other friendly races. Though Sylvan elves do not seek war, they will defend their homelands when in danger.

=== Humans ===
Much of the Human race was enslaved by the elves while they were still living in barbaric tribes. Many slaves escaped back to their wild cousins with knowledge of elven civilization - for this reason, much of human civilization works like elven civilization. The humans have since been mostly freed of elven bondage, and many small empires have developed across Arcana. Barbarian tribes still exist in the wilder areas of Arcana as well.

=== Other armies ===
Other armies included and described in the 5th edition book are Orcs, The Giant Kings, Halflings, Centaurs, Goblins, Undead, Beastmen, Lizard-men, and Hogs (a race of pig people).
