= Santos Manuel Student Union =

California State University, San Bernardino Santos Manuel Student Union
- The Union
- Interactive map of the California State University, San Bernardino; Santos Manuel Student Union area

General information
- Type: Student union
- Location: San Bernardino, California
- Coordinates: 34°10′53″N 117°19′25″W
- Renovated: Fall 2006

Renovating team
- Renovating firm: CannonDesign

Website
- http://studentunion.csusb.edu/

The Santos Manuel Student Union is a student union located near the geographical the center of California State University, San Bernardino's campus, just east of John M Pfau Library. The Santos Manuel Student Union leads into the heart of the CSUSB campus and is located near many buildings, including University Hall, the College of Education, the Student Health Center, and the Serrano Village dormitories in addition to being close to administrative services.

== Student Union ==
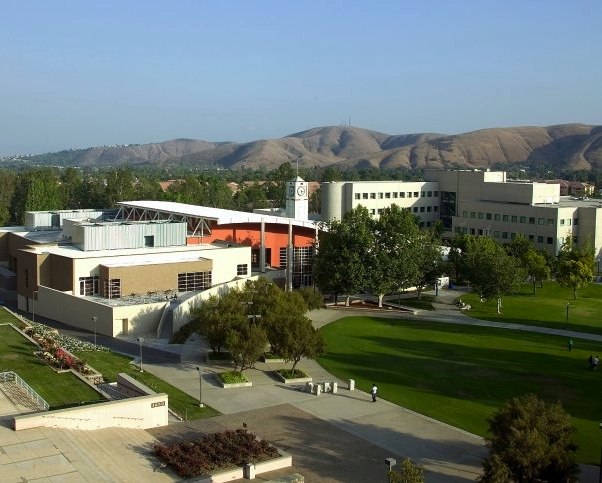
Student Union is the building in the center and left.

The Student Union offers a variety of services, places, and spaces geared to the needs of students including restaurants, meeting rooms, an arcade and various student organizations.

== See also ==
- California State University, San Bernardino
- Student activity center
