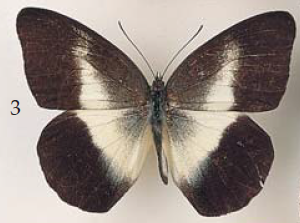
- Female specimen
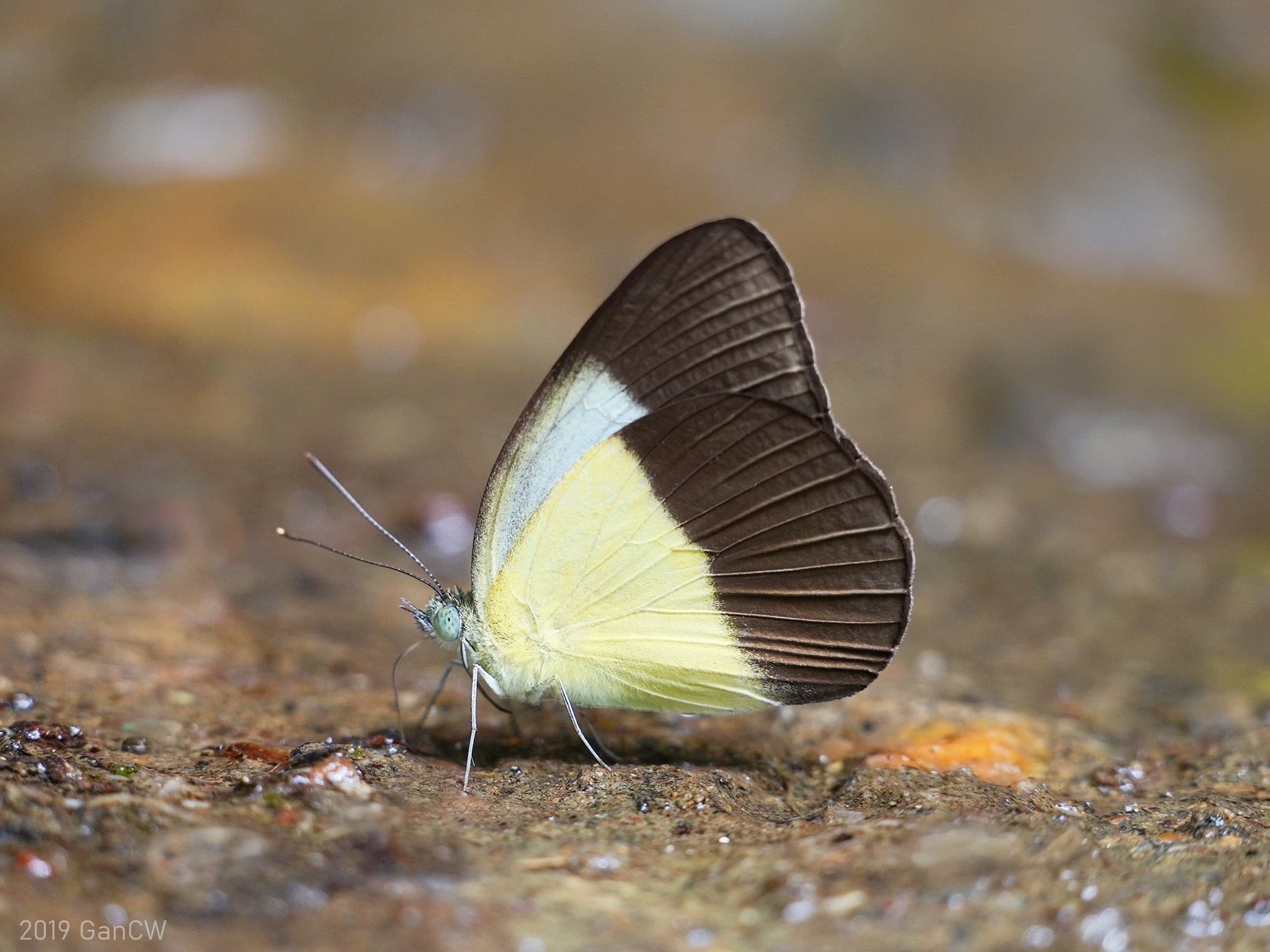

Scientific classification
- Kingdom: Animalia
- Phylum: Arthropoda
- Clade: Pancrustacea
- Class: Insecta
- Order: Lepidoptera
- Superfamily: Papilionoidea
- Family: Pieridae
- Genus: Aoa de Nicéville, 1898
- Species: A. affinis

Binomial name
- Aoa affinis (van Vollenhoven, 1865)

= Aoa affinis =

Species of butterfly

Aoa is a monotypic genus of butterflies in the family Pieridae. The genus and its sole species, Aoa affinis, are endemic to Sulawesi.
