= The Little Heroes =

American rock band

The Little Heroes are an indie rock band, formed in Santa Barbara, California in 2004. The band consists of James Lombardo (vocals, guitar), Jonathan Miller (guitar, keyboard), Trevor Pawlewicz (bass) and Sean Price (drums). The band took its name from a series of sculptures composed by their original drummer, Adam Caldwell, which were called “The Little Heroes.”

In 2006, the band signed a record deal with Wednesday Records. The band released its first single titled September Falls, on September 19, 2006. Black Velvet Magazine described the single as “so radio-friendly it hurts and so stunning it stops you in your tracks.” The single appeared alongside 3OH!3 and Oliver Future in Episode 5 of the MTV show Real World Hollywood.

In March 2007, the band followed up the single with their first full-length record “Cinematic Americana.” The record was produced by Angus Cooke (The Ataris, The Snake, The Cross, The Crown, Bad Astronaut) at Orange Whip Studios. The record received coverage in national publications such as PopMatters, Lost at Sea and The Red Alert. Billboard Magazine described the sound on the record, stating “We Love it. We really do. There's jagged pieces of Jimmy Eat World, Silversun Pickups and Saves The Day poking through string sections and big crescendos, the kind of sweeping melodic Valium that makes our stone-cold hearts like Coldplay.” The record broke the Top 200 on the CMJ college music charts. Songs from the record went on to be featured in over fifty film and television shows, including MTV’s “The Hills,” Lifetime Network’s “Army Wives” and the CW’s “One Tree Hill.”

On November 10, 2009, The Little Heroes released their second full-length record entitled “Thank You.” The record was recorded in Los Angeles, California at Kingsize Soundlabs (Built to Spill, Rilo Kiley, Great Northern) and mastered by Dave Harris (John Vanderslice) at Studio B in North Carolina.

== Members ==
- James Lombardo (Vocals, Guitar)
- Jonathan Miller (Guitar)
- Trevor Pawlewicz (Bass)
- Sean Price (Drums)
- Ray Salazar (Drums on Cinematic Americana)

== Discography ==
=== Studio albums ===
- Thank You (2009)
- Cinematic Americana] (2007)

=== EPs ===
- September Falls EP (2006)
