= Sonoma State University Academic Foundation =

Sonoma State University Foundation
- Formation: 1974
- Type: Public-benefit nonprofit corporation
- Headquarters: Rohnert Park, CA, United States
- Expenses: (2015)
- Website: https://foundation.sonoma.edu/

The Sonoma State University Foundation was originally approved by the CSU as a new Auxiliary organization and established as the California State College, Sonoma Foundation for Educational Development, Inc. in 1974, with Articles of Incorporation certified on May 1, 1974. The Foundation continues to maintain its 501(c)(3) not-for-profit status.

The Foundation was originally formed to promote and assist the education and academically-related services and programs of Sonoma State University which includes, but it not limited to, activities furthering and enhancing the educational effectiveness of the University, faculty, administration, and staff in the discharge of responsibilities appropriate to the educational objectives of the University. This included obtaining federal agency and private foundation aid for the University, its faculty and students, promoting community interest in the University; and operating University-connected enterprises, special educational projects, and instructional related research activities.

Since its inception the Foundation has made various name and purpose changes. The name was changed to Sonoma State University Academic Foundation, Inc. in 1978, with the current name, Sonoma State University Foundation adopted in 2017.

In past years, the Foundation's focus was primarily on asset and investment management of the University Endowment and to provide an annual distribution to scholarship and campus programs based on donor intent. With a change in campus leadership in 2016, the Foundation is transitioning to a more philanthropy-focused organization, supporting advancement efforts on behalf of the University to complement its asset and endowment functions.
