= San Diego State University Research Foundation =

Nonprofit, auxiliary research organization

San Diego State University (SDSU) Research Foundation
- Established: 1943
- Location: San Diego, California, U.S.
- Campus: San Diego State University
- Website: www.foundation.sdsu.edu

The San Diego State University (SDSU) Research Foundation is a self-financed 501(c)(3) nonprofit corporation, incorporated in 1943 in California. The foundation is an auxiliary organization within the California State University system, authorized by the Education Code of the State of California. The foundation is chartered to provide and augment programs that are an integral part of the educational mission of San Diego State University. With annual revenues approaching $200 million and over 5,800 staff, contract and grant employees, it is the largest auxiliary within the CSU system.

== Mission ==
The purpose of the SDSU Research Foundation is to further the educational, research and community service mission of SDSU.

== Management ==
The SDSU Research Foundation is governed by a board of directors whose principal function is to establish policies and guide the corporation in achieving its objectives. The chief executive officer of SDSU Research Foundation is responsible to the board of directors for the management of the organization, serving as liaison between the board and a staff that implements and carries out all board policies and procedures.
