= Spencer the Gardener =

Musical artist

- Origin: Santa Barbara, California
- Genres: Indie pop; zydeco; latin; mariachi; alternative; folk; big band
- Years active: 1989–present
- Labels: Spencer the Gardener; Love That Records
- Members: Spencer Barnitz; Nate Birkey; Cougar Estrada; John Schnackenberg; Gary Sangenitto; Brett Larsen
- Website: https://www.spencerthegardener.com

Spencer the Gardener is an American band formed in Santa Barbara, California, in 1989.

== History ==
The band, known for its genre-bending, was founded in 1989 by Spencer Barnitz, who was previously a member of the band The Tan. According to Barnitz, Spencer the Gardener is “a Latin, Big Band spy movie, set on the beach in the Sixties.” The band sings lyrics in English and Spanish. They released their debut album, a double-part album called "The First Two Albums", in 1991. While inactive for the next 14 years, the band returned in 2005 with their album "Run Away With Lulu." They have also released two children's albums: "Organic Gangster" in 2009 and "Organic Gangster Vol. 2" in 2019.

Spencer Barnitz has had several health issues throughout his life. In 1991, he got into a car accident which led to him needing open heart surgery, and before then he had gotten a kidney transplant. Despite this he has still continued to tour and perform with the band.

In May 2023, a documentary film based on the band called More Than Just a Party Band debuted at the New Vic theater in Santa Barbara.

== Discography ==
=== Studio albums ===
- The First Two Albums (1991)
- Run Away with Lulu (2005)
- Fiesta (2006)
- Organic Gangster (2009)
- Breaking My Own Heart (2012)
- Organic Gangster, Vol. 2 (2019)
- Shine On (2023)

=== Singles ===
Title	Year	Album
"The Gobble Song"	2007	Organic Gangster
"Oreo The Dog"	2009	Organic Gangster
"Going to a Party"	2017	Non-album single
"Carolina"	2023	Shine On
