= California State Student Association =

American nonprofit organization

Cal State Student Association
- Formation: 1959
- Headquarters: 401 Golden Shore #244, Long Beach, California, United States 90802
- Members: none
- President: Tara Al-Rehani
- Executive Director: Joe Nino
- Assistant Director of Government Relations: Mary Washington
- Website: calstatestudents.org

The California State Student Association (CSSA), also known as the Cal State Student Association, is an "unincorporated income tax-exempt association". CSSA is exempt from taxation under Section 501(c)(3) of the United States Internal Revenue Code and it is exempt from state franchise or income tax under California Revenue and Taxation Code Section 23701d. CSSA is registered with the California Attorney General’s Registry of Charitable Trusts.

== Mission ==
The mission of the California State Student Association (CSSA) is to maintain and enhance the accessibility of an affordable, quality education for the people of California at the California State University. CSSA is the recognized voice for over 450,000 students in the California State University System (CSU). CSSA is the acknowledged statewide student organization designed to represent, serve, and protect the collective interests of students in the CSU system.

== History ==
In 1958, three years before the formation of the California State University (CSU) system, a group of Associated Students presidents founded the Student Presidents Association. This group initially served mostly as an informational forum for the campus student associations, but the fact that a well-organized statewide student association was firmly established when the CSU was founded ensured that the students had a place in the CSU's internal policy-making from the beginning. The Student Presidents Association was formally recognized by the CSU Board of Trustees in 1963, three years after the formation of the system itself and two months after the statewide Academic Senate held its very first meeting.

The 1970s saw a revival in student governance at the CSU that carried through to the present day. In 1972, the Student Presidents Association sponsored legislation that authorized the expenditure of student body fees to fund a lobbyist for CSU students. The bill passed the legislature and was signed into law by then-Gov. Reagan.

By 1974, the student leadership had moved beyond the activism of the 1960s to become more articulate, intelligent, and politically astute. The student leaders of this era were quite successful both in the legislature and within the system, and they are responsible for much of the foundation of student leadership that still exists today. Through their successes with Governor Brown and many legislators, they started the tradition of seeking victories in the legislature if they were not forthcoming from the system.

By 1979, the CSSA had become extraordinarily active, and many student body presidents were finding it difficult to fulfill both their campus and CSSA responsibilities and thus began appointing CSSA representatives (a few campuses had already started electing separate representatives). The association decided to recognize this reality by renaming itself the California State Student Association in 1979.

In 2005, CSSA successfully lobbied for an 8% student fee freeze for the CSU that the governor included in his January budget.

In 2009, California State University faced a $584 million budget cut. The Board of Trustees and the Office of the Chancellor responded by implementing furloughs and work force reductions, a total fee increase of approximately 32%, enrollment caps anticipating a reduction of 40,000 qualified students in the next two academic years, and additional campus-by-campus cuts to cover the remaining $190 million loss. CSSA has continued its dedication to advocacy projects for the betterment of public higher education in California. CSSA continues to maintain regular communication with the California State Legislature, the Office of the Chancellor, and the Board of Trustees, and representatives from each of the 23 campuses meet on a monthly basis.

== Standing Committees ==
=== Executive committee ===
The duty of CSSA Executive Committee is to review, research and make recommendations on the CSSA Budget, CSSA Policies and Procedures and CSSA Personnel matters. The President, Chair, Vice President of Systemwwide Affairs, Vice President of Legislative Affairs, and Vice President of Finance are voting members of the Executive Committee. The Executive Director serves as an advisor to the Executive Committee.

=== Legislative Affairs ===
The job of the Legislative Affairs Committee is to make recommendations to the CSSA board of directors on higher education issues pending in the California State Legislature. Committee members vote to recommend positions on bills and strategies for accomplishing the board's policy objectives. Since 2003, the Legislative Affairs Committee has led the way for CSSA to sponsor legislation that would curtail student fee increases and reform the state financial aid program, called Cal Grants. Members of Legislative Affairs are also leaders in engaging our own campus community on legislation that would affect students by running information-based campaigns on CSU campuses, organizing letter-writing and call-in days, and working with local news outlets. The committee oversees the CSSA Lobby Corps program, which provides the opportunity for students to develop the leadership skills to confidently speak with state senators or assemblymembers and be engaged with civic life.

=== Systemwide Affairs ===
Former CSSA president Michael Wiafe speaks about affordable access to higher education in 2019.

The Systemwide Affairs Committee principals are to promote access, affordability and quality of instruction. In addition, the committee seeks to expanding students' role in the decisions that affect the CSU by influencing system wide issues and policies and promoting shared governance through systemwide committee representation. Each year, these principles are carried out through a policy agenda voted on by the entire CSSA Board. The Systemwide Affair Committee creates an action plan on all policy agenda items, and all 23 campuses work together to progress the student perspective and quality of education on the campus and system-wide level. Systemwide Affairs activities include working with CSU and campus administrators, including the Academic Senate, testifying in front of the Board of Trustees, writing resolutions and passing them on each individual campus, and implementing information campaigns on system policy or initiatives. An example of CSSA activity within systemwide affairs would be the annual voter registration drives hosted by individual campuses to help encourage the next generation of young people to become involved in the electoral process.

=== Internal Affairs Committee ===
The Internal Affairs Committee develops and revises the policies, procedures, and constitution of CSSA, as well as the scholarship funding for dues-paying campuses and other internal documents as directed by the board. The committee ensures that members of the California State Student Association derive the maximum benefit from their association by ensuring that the board stays focused on student issues.

=== Social Justice and Equity Committee ===
The Social Justice and Equity Committee is an official ongoing force of the CSSA to advance and monitor the further development of programs and policies regarding the maintenance and enhancement of diversity, social justice, and equity within the CSU system and campus communities. Student leaders express their concerns about the need to build supportive rather than hateful environments on CSU campuses and adopt resolutions that recognize these concerns and request that the administration take proactive steps to foster a welcoming and supportive environment.

== CHESS Conference ==
CSSA hosts the California Higher Education Student Summit (CHESS) annual conference composed of California State University leaders, student advocates, higher education policy experts, public officials, alumni and students. This conference is the only statewide leadership conference for CSU students. CHESS offers student leaders a variety of ways in which to become active members of their respective communities with a focus in higher education.

== Nomination of student trustees ==
The California State University (CSU) is administered by a board named "Trustees of the California State University". California Education Code Section 66602 provides that the CSU board shall include two students. Paragraph (b)(2) of Section 66602 provides that, "In the selection of students as members of the board, the Governor shall appoint the students from lists of names of at least two, but not more than five, persons furnished by the governing board of any statewide student organization that represents the students of the California State University and the student body organizations of the campuses of the California State University". In accordance with that paragraph, the CSSA nominates students for appointment to the CSU board of trustees.

== Board of directors ==
The California State University has 23 campuses and a "student body organization" has been established at each campus. Each student body organization may appoint one person to serve as a member of the governing board of CSSA. The governing board is known as the "California State Student Association Board of Directors". As of June 30, 2017, the following student body organizations are participating in the governance of CSSA:

- Associated Students, California State University, Bakersfield, Inc. — (California State University, Bakersfield)
- Associated Students of California State University, Channel Islands, Inc. — (California State University, Channel Islands)
- Associated Students of California State University, Chico — (California State University, Chico)
- Associated Students, California State University, Dominguez Hills — (California State University, Dominguez Hills)
- Associated Students, Inc., California State University, East Bay — (California State University, East Bay)
- Associated Students California State University, Fresno — (California State University, Fresno)
- Associated Students California State University, Fullerton, Inc. — (California State University, Fullerton)
- Associated Students of Humboldt State University — (Humboldt State University)
- Associated Students, California State University, Long Beach — (California State University, Long Beach)
- Associated Students of California State University, Los Angeles, Inc. — (California State University, Los Angeles)
- Associated Students of the California Maritime Academy — (California Maritime Academy)
- Associated Students of California State University Monterey Bay — (California State University, Monterey Bay)
- Associated Students, California State University, Northridge, Inc. — (California State University, Northridge)
- Associated Students, Incorporated, California State Polytechnic University, Pomona — (California State Polytechnic University, Pomona)
- Associated Students of California State University, Sacramento — (California State University, Sacramento)
- Associated Students California State University, San Bernardino — (California State University, San Bernardino)
- Associated Students, San Diego State University — (San Diego State University)
- Associated Students of San Francisco State University — (San Francisco State University)
- Associated Students San Jose State University — (San Jose State University)
- Associated Students, Incorporated of California Polytechnic State University at San Luis Obispo — (California Polytechnic State University, San Luis Obispo)
- The Associated Students of California State University, San Marcos — (California State University, San Marcos)
- Associated Students of Sonoma State University — (Sonoma State University)
- Associated Students Incorporated of California State University, Stanislaus — (California State University, Stanislaus)

== See also ==
- Student Senate for California Community Colleges
- University of California Student Association
- California State University
- Student governments in the United States
