= De La Hoya Animo High School =

Oscar De La Hoya Ánimo Charter High School

Location
- 1114 South Lorena St. Los Angeles, CA 90023; United States; 34.0234°N 118.2034°W

Information
- Other name: De La Hoya Ánimo High School
- Type: Public
- Motto: The Pride! of Boyle Heights (2013–2017); College, Leadership, Life (2017–present)
- Established: 25 August 2003
- Founder: Oscar De La Hoya
- School district: LAUSD
- Oversight: Green Dot Public Schools
- Principal: Xochitl Avellan
- Grades: 9 - 12
- Enrollment: 209 (2019-20)
- Website: ca.greendot.org/odlh/

Oscar De La Hoya Ánimo Charter High School (ODLHA, also known as De La Hoya Ánimo High School) is a public high school operated by Green Dot Public Schools of Los Angeles. The school began operating in 2003 at another site while construction of the school was happening on the former site of his gym, with the building opening in 2009.

== History ==
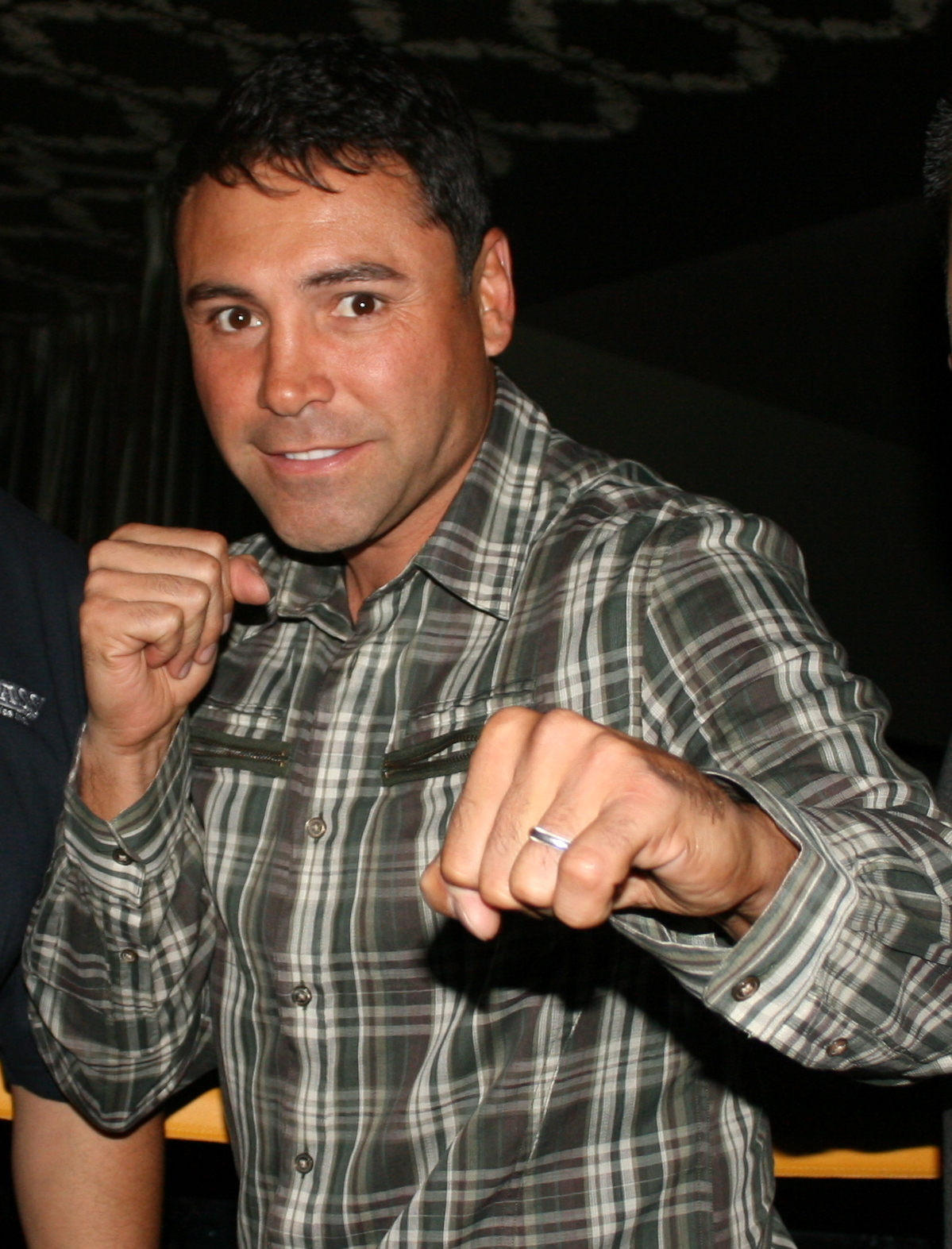
Oscar De La Hoya, the namesake and founder of the school.

De La Hoya Ánimo High School was founded on August 25, 2003 by former professional boxer Oscar De La Hoya as means to provide families living in the Boyle Heights and East L.A. areas with an alternative to larger urban high schools such as Roosevelt High School and Garfield High School. The school was at a temporary facility at the Salesian Family Youth Center before relocating in 2008 to the L.A. World Trade Center in Downtown Los Angeles, with the first class having 140 freshman students. The school was built at the former site of De La Hoya's boxing gym. In the fourth graduation in 2007, De La Hoya, Green Dot founder Steve Barr and Los Angeles City Council member José Huizar spoke at the ceremony.

That same year De La Hoya donated $3.5 million to the school during its second annual graduation ceremony to help fund new facilities on the campus as well as helping develop other public charter schools. In 2009, the construction was completed, and De La Hoya celebrated the official opening of the school.

In 2010, Dr. Harris Luu, the principal for 10 years, announced his resignation citing personal reasons. The announcement sparked controversy as they were dissatisfied with the reason and had thought that he was forced out by teachers who did not want to participate in several after-school programs created by Luu. In 2020, due to the COVID-19 pandemic, the graduating class were featured on KNBC's "Saluting the Class of 2020." In March 2021, they offered on-campus instruction to the students who might not have graduated.

== Demographics ==
In the 2019-2020 school year, there were 611 students enrolled, with 10.3% being English Learners, 2.6% being homeless, 97.2% being socioeconomically disadvantaged and 13.4% with disabilities. As much as 99% of students were Hispanic or Latino, living in East Los Angeles and Boyle Heights. Approximately 97% of the senior class graduated in 2010.

Ethnicity	Students (2017-2018)
Hispanic or Latino	99%
White	1%
