= Karl Farmer =

American football player (born 1954)

No. 80, 84
- Position: Wide receiver

Personal information
- Born: August 28, 1954 (age 72); Oklahoma City, Oklahoma, U.S.
- Listed height: 5 ft 11 in (1.80 m)
- Listed weight: 165 lb (75 kg)

Career information
- High school: George Washington (Westmont, California)
- College: Pittsburgh (1974–1975)
- NFL draft: 1976: 7th round, 193rd overall pick

Career history
- Atlanta Falcons (1976–1977); Tampa Bay Buccaneers (1978)

Career NFL statistics
- Receptions: 2
- Receiving yards: 39
- Return yards: 419
- Stats at Pro Football Reference

Karl Anthony Farmer (born August 28, 1954) is an American former professional football player who was a wide receiver for three seasons in the National Football League (NFL) with the Atlanta Falcons and Tampa Bay Buccaneers. He was selected by the Falcons in the seventh round of the 1976 NFL draft. He played college football at Los Angeles Southwest College before transferring to the Pittsburgh Panthers.

== Early life ==
Karl Anthony Farmer was born on August 28, 1954, in Oklahoma City, Oklahoma. He attended George Washington Preparatory High School in Westmont, California.

== College career ==
Farmer played college football at Los Angeles Southwest College from 1972 to 1973. He was then a two-year letterman for the Pittsburgh Panthers of the University of Pittsburgh from 1974 to 1975. He caught 18 passes for 285 yards and four touchdowns in 1974 and five passes for 127 yards and one touchdown in 1975. Farmer was a 1976 All American for the Pittsburgh Panthers track and field team, finishing runner-up in the 600 yards at the 1976 NCAA Indoor Track and Field Championships.

== Professional career ==
Farmer was selected by the Atlanta Falcons in the seventh round, with the 193rd overall pick, of the 1976 NFL draft. He officially signed with the team on April 28. He played in the first game of the 1976 season, returning one punt for no yards, before being placed on injured reserve on September 14 and spending the rest of the year there. Farmer was released on August 31, 1977, but re-signed on September 13. He played in all 14 games for the Falcons during the 1977 season, totaling two receptions for 39 yards, one rushing attempt for four yards, 21 kick returns for 419 yards, two fumbles, and four fumble recoveries. He was released on August 28, 1978.

Farmer signed with the Tampa Bay Buccaneers on November 1, 1978. He appeared in two games for the Buccaneers that season before being placed on injured reserve on November 14, 1978. He was released in 1979.
