= 2017 Los Angeles mayoral election =

- March 7, 2017
- Turnout: 20.1% ▼2.9 pp
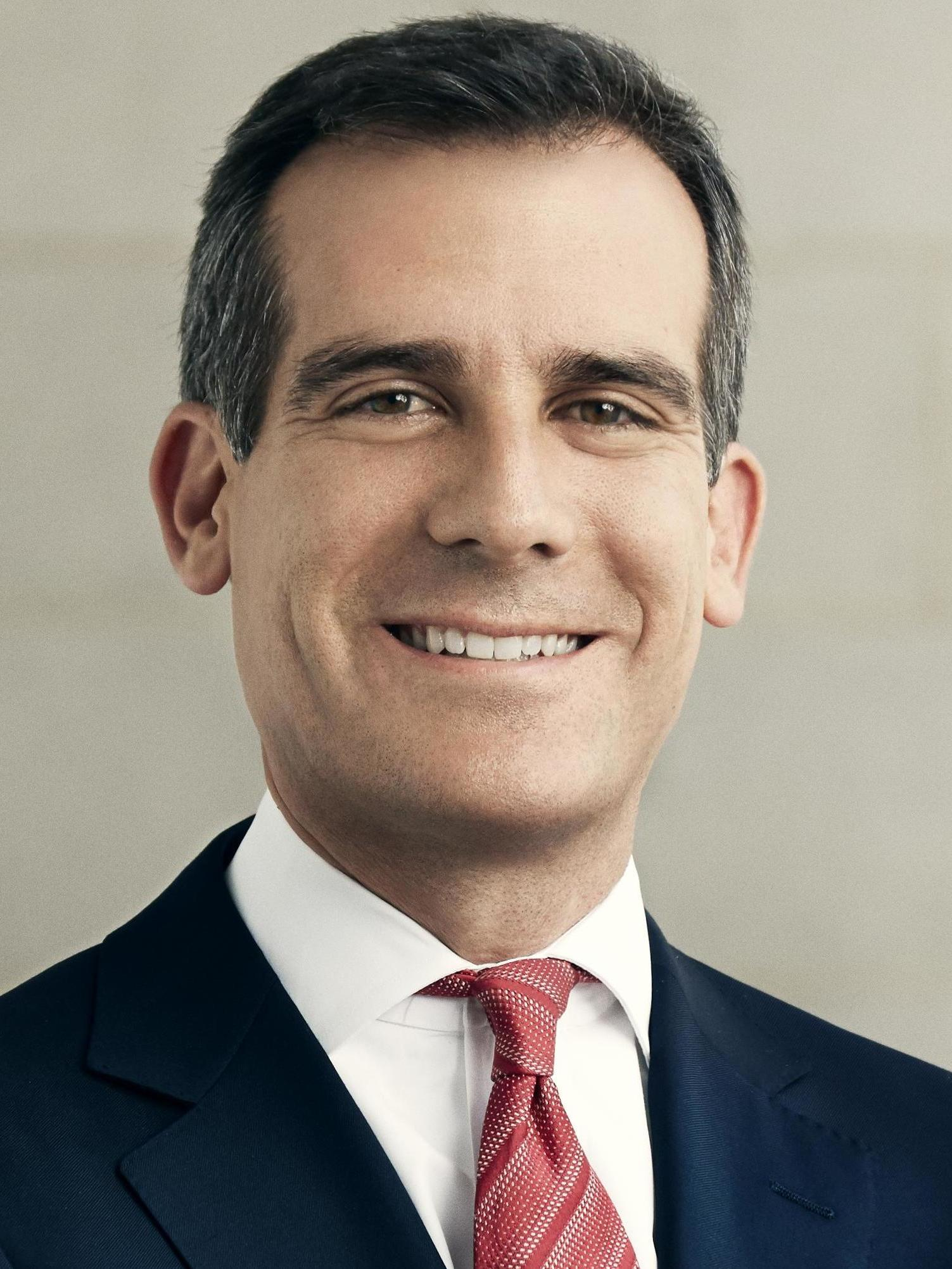

Candidate	Eric Garcetti	Mitchell Schwartz
Popular vote	331,310	33,228
Percentage	81.4%	8.2%
- Results by city council district Garcetti: 60–70% 70–80% 80–90%
Mayor before election
Eric Garcetti
Elected Mayor
Eric Garcetti

The 2017 Los Angeles mayoral election was held on March 7, 2017, to elect the mayor of Los Angeles. Due to a change in the city's election calendar to align mayoral elections with statewide elections, the winner stood to serve a term of five years and six months instead of the usual four years.

Municipal elections in California are officially non-partisan. Incumbent Eric Garcetti won a record 81.4% share of the vote in the primary, eliminating the need for a run-off. Voting turnout was relatively low at 20.1%.

== Candidates ==
=== Declared ===
- Paul E. Amori
- Y.J. Draiman, businessman, member of the Northridge East Neighborhood Council, father of David Draiman and candidate for mayor in 2013
- Eric Garcetti, incumbent mayor of Los Angeles (party preference: Democratic)
- Diane "Pinky" Harman, retired teacher
- David Hernandez, activist (party preference: Republican)
- Yuval Kremer, teacher
- Rudy Melendez, laborer
- Frantz Pierre, activist
- Eric Preven, writer
- Dennis Richter, factory worker
- David "Zuma Dogg" Saltsburg, activist
- Mitchell Schwartz, political strategist, environmentalist and entrepreneur (party preference: Democratic)

=== Withdrawn ===
- Steve Barr, educator, activist and founder of Green Dot Public Schools and Rock the Vote
- William Haynes, YouTube personality

== Endorsements ==
Eric Garcetti

Organizations

- Americans for Democratic Action Southern California

Newspapers

- Los Angeles Daily News

== Results ==
Los Angeles mayoral election, 2017
Candidate	Votes	%
Eric Garcetti (incumbent)	331,310	81.37
Mitchell Jack Schwartz	33,228	8.16
David Hernandez	13,346	3.28
Diane "Pinky" Harman	5,115	1.26
David "Zuma Dogg" Saltsburg	4,809	1.18
Dennis Richter	4,558	1.12
YJ J Draiman	3,705	0.91
Frantz Pierre	3,386	0.83
Eric Preven	3,023	0.74
Yuval Kremer	2,436	0.60
Paul E. Amori	2,231	0.55
Total votes	407,147	100.00
