= Jonathan Chait =

American political commentator

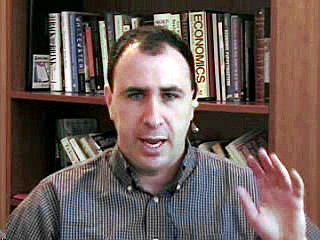
- Education: University of Michigan
- Occupations: Political commentator, editor, author
- Notable credit(s): senior editor at The New Republic; former assistant editor of The American Prospect; author of The Big Con; former fellow at New America Foundation; frequent guest on BloggingHeads.tv
- Spouse: Robin Chait
- Children: 2

Jonathan Chait (/ˈtʃeɪt/) is an American pundit and writer for The Atlantic. He was previously a senior editor at The New Republic, an assistant editor of The American Prospect, and a writer for New York magazine. He writes a periodic column in the Los Angeles Times.

== Early life ==
Chait is the son of Illene (née Seidman) and David Chait.

== Career ==
Chait began working at The New Republic in 1995. His writing has appeared in The New York Times, The Wall Street Journal, Slate, and Reason. He took over The New Republic's TRB column from Peter Beinart in March 2007. Chait was named a finalist for the 2009 Ellie (National Magazine Award) in the Columns and Commentary category for three of his 2008 columns.

On March 16, 2009, his article "Wasting Away in Hooverville" appeared in The New Republic.

Chait appears in The Rivalry, a 2007 HBO documentary about the history and culture of the Michigan–Ohio State football rivalry. He joined the staff of New York magazine on September 6, 2011, leaving his post as senior editor of The New Republic. Of the move, he said: "Obviously, I love TNR and had no plans to leave, but the opportunity at New York was irresistible. Everybody who works there raves about it, and my friends in journalism have noticed for a while it's become phenomenal—'the best magazine in America', as one editor friend of mine told me."

== Positions ==
Chait supported the 2003 invasion of Iraq. In 2004, the Washington Post published his article "Case for Bush Hatred".

While a student at the University of Michigan, Chait was a columnist for the The Michigan Daily. He criticized the editorial staff of the Detroit Free Press after it published an article by Michael Rosenberg that alleged systematic infractions of NCAA rules by the university's football team under former head coach Rich Rodriguez. Chait suggested Rosenberg's editor should "lose his job" and called the investigation's methodology "journalistic malpractice".

On February 22, 2010, after an investigation stemming from allegations raised in Rosenberg's article, the university announced that the NCAA had found probable cause that the school committed five major violations, corroborating some of the allegations in Rosenberg's article. On May 24, 2010, the University of Michigan responded to the NCAA Notice of Allegations, writing in part, "the University is satisfied that the initial media reports were greatly exaggerated if not flatly incorrect." Chait then claimed Rosenberg's allegation that Rodriguez "operated a football sweatshop has been totally debunked".

On January 27, 2015, Chait wrote an article for New York magazine on political correctness, which he called "a system of left-wing ideological repression", citing examples from academia and social media. His piece drew parallels between forms of political correctness popular in the 2010s and those popular in the 1990s. He also argued that the advent of social media had contributed to a form of political correctness that was more ubiquitous and less confined to academia.

In February 2016, Chait wrote the New York magazine article "Why Liberals Should Support a Trump Republican Nomination", in which he predicted Trump "would almost certainly lose" the 2016 presidential election, and that a hypothetical Trump presidency would do "less harm to the country than a Marco Rubio or a Cruz presidency", developing similarly to the governorship of Arnold Schwarzenegger in California (who, like Trump, was a celebrity who became a Republican politician without any public service experience). In 2019, The Outline selected this piece as one of the "worst takes of the 2010s", writing, "Chait's immensely confident take [...] is a humiliating crystallization of the wrongheaded thinking that propelled [Trump] to the White House." Chait has since stated that Trump is a "threat to the American democracy."

Chait has written in support of charter schools. On January 14, 2019, he accused Senator Elizabeth Warren of selling out to "powerful interests" for opposing an initiative that would have expanded the number of charter schools in Massachusetts. Writer Alexander Russo criticized Chait for not consistently disclosing his wife's charter school advocacy.

Chait opposes Marxism, writing, "Marxist governments trample on individual rights because Marxist theory does not care about individual rights. Marxism is a theory of class justice [...] Unlike liberalism, which sees rights as a positive-sum good that can expand or contract for society as a whole, Marxists (and other left-wing critics of liberalism) think of political rights as a zero-sum conflict. Either they are exercised on behalf of oppression or against it."

== Personal life ==
Chait is married to Robin Joy Chait, an analyst and charter school advocate. He has two children. Chait is Jewish.

== Bibliography ==
=== Books ===
- Chait, Jonathan (2007). The big con: the true story of how Washington got hoodwinked and hijacked by crackpot economics. Boston: Houghton Mifflin.
  - Reprinted as The big con: crackpot economics and the fleecing of America. Boston: Mariner Books. 2008.
- — (2017). Audacity: how Barack Obama defied his critics and created a legacy that will prevail. Custom House.

=== Essays and reporting ===
- Chait, Jonathan (June 2013). "The loneliest Republican: Josh Barro's growing contempt for the GOP — and its would-be reformers". Dispatches. Sketch. The Atlantic. 311 (5): 28–30.

=== Critical studies and reviews of Chait's work ===
Audacity

- Shenk, Timothy (January–February 2017). "Dead center: the failure of 'grown up' liberalism". The New Republic. Vol. 248, no. 1–2. pp. 61–63.
