= Ánimo Inglewood Charter High School =

Charter school in Inglewood, California, United States

Coordinates: 33.960426°N 118.331698°W

Ánimo Inglewood Charter High School is a public charter school in Inglewood, California, operated by Green Dot Public Schools of Los Angeles. It was described as one of the "highest performing campuses across the state" in 2016.

== History ==
Ánimo Inglewood Charter was the second Green Dot school to be established, due in part to the success of Ánimo Leadership Charter High School. It was chartered in 2001, and opened in August 2002, with 145 new students, adding a new freshman class of 140 every year until 2006, when it reached full capacity to approximately 525 students. Classes began at the First United Methodist Church on the corner of Kelso Street and Spruce Avenue for three years, until moving to the old Kaiser Permanente hospital on Manchester Boulevard.

The first class graduated in 2006. More than 85% of students from each class graduate and enroll in four-year colleges/universities.

In 2014, Ismael Jimenez and Denise Gomez, seniors at Ánimo Inglewood Charter High School, were among the ten people killed in a chartered bus accident on Interstate 5 near Orland, California. In 2016, Ánimo Inglewood Charter was described in the Los Angeles Times as "among the highest performing campuses across the state", with 87% of the students passing English tests and 73% meeting or exceeding math standards.
