= Ánimo South Los Angeles Charter High School =

High school in California, USA

Coordinates: 33.932974°N 118.308470°W

Location
- 11130 S. Western Ave. Westmont, Los Angeles County, California 90047; United States

Information
- School type: Charter public high school
- Established: 2004
- Status: Open
- Oversight: Green Dot Public Schools
- Principal: Taiala Carvalho (July 2013–)
- Staff: 14 (2012–13)
- Teaching staff: 28 (2012–13)
- Grades: 9-12
- Enrollment: 591 (2016–17)
- Average class size: 20
- Student to teacher ratio: 23:1
- Hours in school day: 7.5 hours
- Campus size: Small
- Campus type: Suburb
- Colours: Black; Gold
- Slogan: Preparing students for College, Leadership, and Life
- Athletics: Soccer, Basketball, Softball, Football, Track
- Mascot: Black panther
- National ranking: 801 (U.S. News & World Report, 2013)
- Newspaper: Paw Print
- Website: greendot.org/southla/

Ánimo South Los Angeles Charter High School (also known as "ASLA", or "Animo South LA") is a public charter school operated by Green Dot Public Schools of Los Angeles.

It is in Westmont, California, with a Los Angeles postal address.

== History ==
Ànimo South Los Angeles Charter High School was founded by Green Dot Public Schools and established in August 2004. The first graduating class graduated in 2008. It is accredited by the Western Association of Schools and Colleges through June 30, 2014.

Animo South Los Angeles was founded in response to the dangerous circumstances surrounding Washington Preparatory High School, one of Los Angeles's most troubled schools. According to the Los Angeles Times, in the 2000–2001 school year, thirty five percent of Washington Prep students were suspended, far passing district-wide suspension rates of thirteen percent. Not only were test scores and academic performance extremely poor, but the campus itself was so unsafe that in 2002, the teachers filed a written complaint to their union, calling the school "out of control" and demanding increased security on campus. Reports were released that the school was plagued by drugs, violence, and sex. Since Animo South LA was formed in 2004, students at this school have a safe place to go to where they can learn. Animo South LA has outperformed Washington High School in statewide API scores by over 150 points.

Animo South LA's graduation rate is 81%. 90% of Graduating seniors are accepted into college, 79% attend college

=== July 22, 2014, Fire ===
On the afternoon of Tuesday July 22, 2014, around 2:17 pm LAFD received a call reporting a fire in a High School near Western and Imperial. Reportedly the fire started with an AC malfunction. According to Los Angeles County Fire inspector Scott Miller, the School's roof, and exterior wall collapsed. 2 Firefighters were injured by the fire; they reportedly went inside to see if there were people in need of help. The fire made national news and the fire was seen in all of Los Angeles. One of Green Dot's first schools, Animo South just celebrated its 10th anniversary when the fire happened.

== Awards and recognition ==
In 2013, Animo South LA was ranked the 801st best high school in the United States and 162nd in California.

In 2012 and 2013, U.S. News & World Report ranked Animo South LA as a Silver Medal School.

== Student demographics ==
As of the school year 2012–13, there were a total of 537 students attending the high school.

- 55.6% Hispanic (299)
- 43.3% Black (233)
- 0.5% Other (3)
- 0.3% White (2)
- 57% Female (305)
- 43% Male (232)

== School Scores ==
=== CAHSEE ===
CAHSEE pass percentages accounted only for 10th graders.

Year	2008	2009	2010	2011	2012
English	82%	78%	84%	82%	86%
Math	70%	68%	83%	84%	87%

=== API ===
Year	2008	2009	2010	2011	2012
Score	678	692	730	739	709

== Athletics ==
The school competes in the CIF Southern Section of the California Interscholastic Federation (CIF) association and offers the following sports:

- Volleyball (girls, boys)
- Soccer (boys, girls)
- Basketball (boys, girls)
- Softball (girls)
- Track and Field (boys, girls)
- Cross Country (boys, girls)
- Cheerleading (girls)

On March 3, 2012, the Boys Basketball team won the 2012 CIF Los Angeles City Small Schools Boys Basketball Section championship vs Viewpark High with a score of (49–47). Also in 2012 the Girls soccer team made it to the Playoffs the first time in the school's history

== Notable alumni ==
- Corey Fowler (Smoove Da General), recording artist. member of Cali Swag District, creator of Teach Me How to Dougie.
- Jose Anthony Dheming, Salvadorian Footballer who plays for Chivas USA Academy and the El Salvador U-20 National Football Team.
