= Lennox, California =

- Census-designated place
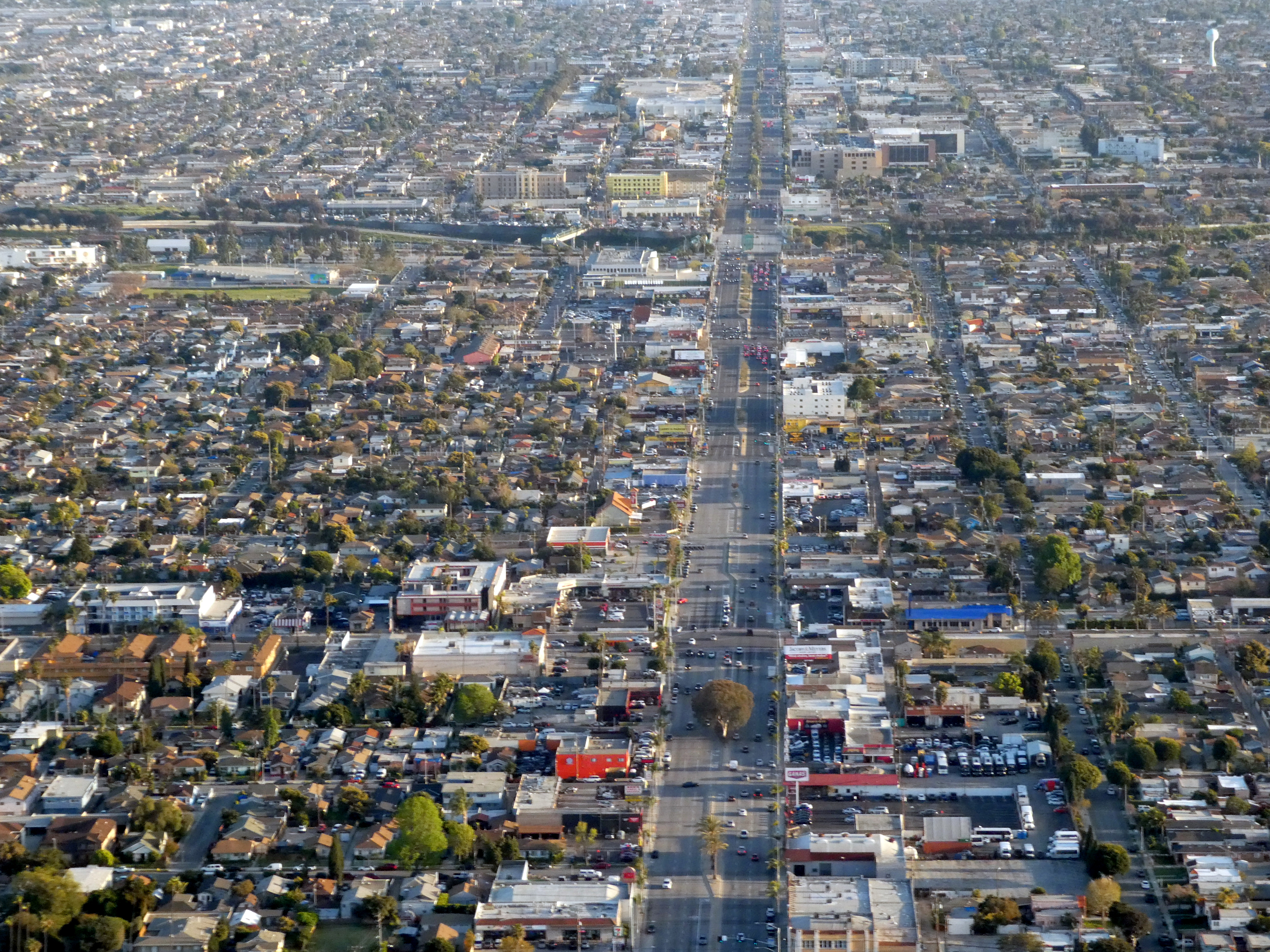
- Aerial view of Hawthorne Boulevard in Lennox in 2024
- Interactive map of Lennox, California
- Location in the United States
- Coordinates: 33°56′23″N 118°21′27″W
- Country: United States
- State: California
- County: Los Angeles

Area
  - Total: 1.093 sq mi (2.832 km^{2})
  - Land: 1.093 sq mi (2.832 km^{2})
  - Water: 0 sq mi (0 km^{2}) 0%
- Elevation: 72 ft (22 m)

Population (2020)
  - Total: 20,323
  - Density: 18,590/sq mi (7,176/km^{2})
- Time zone: UTC−8 (PST)
  - Summer (DST): UTC−7 (PDT)
- ZIP Code: 90304
- Area code: 310
- FIPS code: 06-41180
- GNIS feature ID: 1652743

Lennox is a census-designated place (CDP) in the South Bay region of Los Angeles County, California, United States. The population was 20,323 at the 2020 census, down from 22,753 at the 2010 census.

== History ==
Lennox was established as a small farming settlement sometime around 1905, and named Lennox in 1912. Formerly part of the vast rancho owned by Daniel Freeman, by the 1920s it was an established community spanning 7 square miles, with a Pacific Electric railway line running through its center along Hawthorne Boulevard.

It was during the 1920s that the neighboring cities of Hawthorne and Inglewood, incorporated in 1922 and 1905 respectively, began to annex large portions of Lennox. The Arbor Vitae section, a highly developed commercial and residential area along Arbor Vitae Street, was annexed by Inglewood in 1924. Shortly afterwards, in 1925, an attempt to annex a further two square miles of Lennox was decisively defeated at the ballot box. By the early 1930s, Lennox had a population of over 9,000 despite losing much of its territory. At this time it measured just over two square miles.

In 1939, FHA documents described the area as an intermittently developed farming community, highly heterogenous in construction and population. They reported that the community was poorly regarded by mortgage lenders and gave it a high risk rating. The surveyors noted, however, that "The town is quite evidently on the upgrade, recent construction being of distinctly better quality and design than the older dwellings." This proved correct, as the area would see a massive boom in the following decades.

The South Bay region was a major center of aircraft production during World War II, spurring rapid industrialization and residential development to house industrial workers. After the war, in 1949, the establishment of Los Angeles International Airport immediately to the West had an enormous impact on Lennox. Many residents worked at the airport or in the many airport-related businesses nearby, and the nearby cities of Hawthorne and El Segundo became major centers of the postwar aerospace industry.

During the 1960s, Lennox shrank to its current size. The census reported a 48% decline in population from 1960 to 1970 due to the annexation of large areas into Inglewood and Hawthorne, but both complete annexation and incorporation would fail to materialize. The introduction of jet aircraft, including the supersonic Concorde, significantly increased noise and air pollution in Lennox. The construction of Interstate 405 in the 1950s and 1960s, followed by the construction of Interstate 105 along the community's southern border, encircled the area with major freeway infrastructure and further contributed to pollution, which was among the worst in the entire state by 1988.

The deteriorating desirability of the area led to major changes. Despite its reduced geographic area, Lennox grew substantially in population during the 1970s and 1980s. Older suburban and rural development was subsumed by higher density rental housing, and by 1990, 70% of the housing stock was rental units. The abundance of inexpensive rentals and proximity to employment made Lennox a very popular destination for immigrants from Mexico and Central America. Today the area is over 90% Latino, and is one of the largest concentrations of Latino residents on the Western side of Los Angeles County.

During the 1980s, the neighborhood began to struggle with increasing rates of poverty and crime. Gang violence and the Crack epidemic in the United States both severely affected Lennox, which had no local government and was therefore unable to take political action to address its myriad problems. The drug and gang problems reached such a degree on the Lennox portion of Inglewood Avenue that Inglewood considered annexing Lennox in 1990 in order to better police the area.

Since the 1990s, however, Lennox has benefitted greatly from the decline in crime and gang violence across the whole of Los Angeles County. Neighboring areas of Hawthorne and Inglewood have undergone physical redevelopment and economic revitalization, including the renovation of Century Boulevard and the construction of the massive SoFi Stadium and its surrounding housing and commercial development.

== Geography ==
Lennox's boundaries are Century Boulevard to the north (along with neighboring cities of Inglewood and Los Angeles), Interstate 405 (the San Diego Freeway) to the west, and Interstate 105 (the Glenn Anderson Freeway) to the south. Hawthorne Boulevard and Prairie Avenue make up portions of its eastern boundary with Inglewood.

Interstate 105 follows Lennox's borders exactly, forming an odd curve, because opposition from Hawthorne to its construction led to an alignment along the city's far northern boundary.

Lennox was originally much larger, covering several square miles of what is now Inglewood and Hawthorne. Since the area has never successfully voted to incorporate, neighboring cities have repeatedly annexed large chunks of it.

The CDP sits underneath the flight path of passenger jets landing at Los Angeles International Airport (LAX). Inglewood is on one side of Lennox, and Hawthorne is on the other.

According to the United States Census Bureau, the CDP has a total area of 1.1 square miles (2.8 km^{2}), all land.

== Demographics ==
Historical population
Census	Pop.	Note	%±
1960	31,224		—
1970	16,121		−48.4%
1980	18,445		14.4%
1990	22,757		23.4%
2000	22,950		0.8%
2010	22,753		−0.9%
2020	20,323		−10.7%
U.S. Decennial Census; 1860–1870 1880-1890; 1900 1910 1920; 1930 1940 1950; 1960 1970 1980; 1990 2000 2010; 2020

Lennox first appeared as an unincorporated place in the 1960 U.S. census as part of the Inglewood census county division; and as a census designated place in the 1980 United States census.

=== Racial and ethnic composition ===
Lennox CDP, California – Racial and ethnic composition Note: the US Census treats Hispanic/Latino as an ethnic category. This table excludes Latinos from the racial categories and assigns them to a separate category. Hispanics/Latinos may be of any race.
Race / Ethnicity (NH = Non-Hispanic)	Pop 2000	Pop 2010	Pop 2020	% 2000	% 2010	% 2020
White alone (NH)	810	435	367	3.53%	1.91%	1.81%
Black or African American alone (NH)	879	682	746	3.83%	3.00%	3.67%
Native American or Alaska Native alone (NH)	22	24	19	0.10%	0.11%	0.09%
Asian alone (NH)	180	159	217	0.78%	0.70%	1.07%
Native Hawaiian or Pacific Islander alone (NH)	317	184	110	1.38%	0.81%	0.54%
Other race alone (NH)	32	37	93	0.14%	0.16%	0.46%
Mixed race or Multiracial (NH)	108	70	102	0.47%	0.31%	0.50%
Hispanic or Latino (any race)	20,602	21,162	18,669	89.77%	93.01%	91.86%
Total	22,950	22,753	20,323	100.00%	100.00%	100.00%

=== 2020 census ===
As of the 2020 census, Lennox had a population of 20,323. The population density was 18,593.8 inhabitants per square mile (7,179.1/km^{2}). The census reported that 99.6% of residents lived in households, 0.4% lived in non-institutionalized group quarters, and no one was institutionalized.

There were 5,352 households, of which 48.8% had children under the age of 18 living in them. Of all households, 47.0% were married-couple households, 8.9% were cohabiting couple households, 18.2% were households with a male householder and no spouse or partner present, and 25.9% were households with a female householder and no spouse or partner present. About 12.6% of all households were made up of individuals and 3.4% had someone living alone who was 65 years of age or older. The average household size was 3.78. There were 4,419 families (82.6% of all households).

The age distribution was 26.0% under the age of 18, 11.9% aged 18 to 24, 29.2% aged 25 to 44, 23.6% aged 45 to 64, and 9.3% who were 65 years of age or older. The median age was 32.3 years. For every 100 females, there were 100.9 males, and for every 100 females age 18 and over there were 100.6 males age 18 and over.

There were 5,519 housing units at an average density of 5,049.4 units per square mile (1,949.6 units/km^{2}), of which 5,352 (97.0%) were occupied. Of the occupied units, 29.6% were owner-occupied and 70.4% were rented. The homeowner vacancy rate was 0.2% and the rental vacancy rate was 2.3%; overall, 3.0% of housing units were vacant.

Racial composition as of the 2020 census
Race	Number	Percent
White	2,216	10.9%
Black or African American	778	3.8%
American Indian and Alaska Native	672	3.3%
Asian	240	1.2%
Native Hawaiian and Other Pacific Islander	115	0.6%
Some other race	11,883	58.5%
Two or more races	4,419	21.7%
Hispanic or Latino (of any race)	18,669	91.9%

100.0% of residents lived in urban areas, while 0.0% lived in rural areas.

In 2023, the US Census Bureau estimated that the median household income was $60,307, and the per capita income was $22,634. About 13.1% of families and 14.8% of the population were below the poverty line.

=== 2010 census ===
At the 2010 census Lennox had a population of 22,753. The population density was 20,809.4 inhabitants per square mile (8,034.6/km^{2}). The racial makeup of Lennox was 8,623 (37.9%) White (1.9% Non-Hispanic White), 765 (3.4%) African American, 199 (0.9%) Native American, 177 (0.8%) Asian, 188 (0.8%) Pacific Islander, 11,811 (51.9%) from other races, and 990 (4.4%) from two or more races. Hispanic or Latino of any race were 21,162 persons (93.0%).

The census reported that 22,741 people (99.9% of the population) lived in households, 12 (0.1%) lived in non-institutionalized group quarters, and no one was institutionalized.

There were 5,250 households, 3,297 (62.8%) had children under the age of 18 living in them, 2,866 (54.6%) were opposite-sex married couples living together, 1,049 (20.0%) had a female householder with no husband present, 608 (11.6%) had a male householder with no wife present. There were 456 (8.7%) unmarried opposite-sex partnerships, and 29 (0.6%) same-sex married couples or partnerships. 510 households (9.7%) were one person and 128 (2.4%) had someone living alone who was 65 or older. The average household size was 4.33. There were 4,523 families (86.2% of households); the average family size was 4.49.

The age distribution was 7,553 people (33.2%) under the age of 18, 2,765 people (12.2%) aged 18 to 24, 6,926 people (30.4%) aged 25 to 44, 4,291 people (18.9%) aged 45 to 64, and 1,218 people (5.4%) who were 65 or older. The median age was 27.7 years. For every 100 females, there were 105.6 males. For every 100 females age 18 and over, there were 104.5 males.

There were 5,487 housing units at an average density of 5,018.3 per square mile, of the occupied units 1,569 (29.9%) were owner-occupied and 3,681 (70.1%) were rented. The homeowner vacancy rate was 0.9%; the rental vacancy rate was 4.5%. 7,805 people (34.3% of the population) lived in owner-occupied housing units and 14,936 people (65.6%) lived in rental housing units.

During 2009–2013, Lennox had a median household income of $37,659, with 32.3% of the population living below the federal poverty line.

=== 1980s ===
By 1985 people in the Los Angeles area referred to Lennox as "Little Tijuana" due to the size of the Hispanic community, and by that year there were a significant number of newly arrived immigrants. Many had lived in single-family houses that contained two or more families at a time.

== Government ==
In the California State Legislature, Lennox is in the 35th senatorial district, represented by Democrat Laura Richardson, and in the 61st Assembly district, represented by Democrat Tina McKinnor.

As it is an unincorporated area, no municipal government exists.

In the United States House of Representatives, Lennox is in California's 43rd congressional district, represented by Democrat Maxine Waters.

The Los Angeles County Board of Supervisors governs over Lennox like a city council, and is part of Supervisorial District 2, by the leadership of Holly Mitchell.

The Los Angeles County Sheriff's Office has a substation in the area as of 1985.

== Housing ==
=== Homelessness ===
The Los Angeles Homeless Services Authority surveyed the unsheltered homeless population by City/Community and reported as of January 24, 2018, Lennox has an unsheltered homeless population of 175. The homeless population does not include the youth from ages 18–24, LAHSA reports the youth count by Council District (CD), Service Planning Area (SPA), and Supervisorial District (SD). In 2018 there were: 36 (20.6%) unsheltered persons in cars, 3 (1.7%) unsheltered persons in makeshift shelters, 33 (18.9%) unsheltered persons in RVs/Campers, 40 (22.9%) unsheltered persons in tents, 28 (16%) unsheltered persons in vans, and 35 (20%) unsheltered persons on the street. In 2017 there was an unsheltered homeless population of 143. The unsheltered homeless count in 2017 was: 38 (26.6%) unsheltered persons in cars, 17 (11.9%) unsheltered persons in makeshift shelters, 25 (17.5%) unsheltered persons in RVs/Campers, 0 (0%) persons in tents, 22 (15.4%) unsheltered persons in vans, and 41 (28.7%) unsheltered persons on the street. In 2016 Lennox had an unsheltered homeless population of 139. The unsheltered homeless count in 2016 was: 26 (18.7%)unsheltered persons in cars, 0 (0%) unsheltered persons in makeshift shelters, 24 (17.3%) unsheltered persons in RVs/Campers, 0 (0%) unsheltered persons in tents, 14 (10.1%) unsheltered persons in vans, 75 (53.9%) unsheltered persons on the street. Between 2016 and 2017 there was a 3.12% increase in unsheltered persons, and between 2017 and 2018 there was a 21.58% increase in unsheltered persons.

== Education ==
The Lennox Elementary School District and the Centinela Valley Union High School District serve the CDP; combined they do so through 13 schools, two early education centers, five elementary schools, one middle School, and several high schools:

- Hawthorne High School
- Lawndale High School
- Leuzinger High School
- Lennox Mathematics, Science & Technology Academy
- Animo Leadership Charter High School

The Centinela Valley district operated Lennox High School until 1982.

== Public services ==
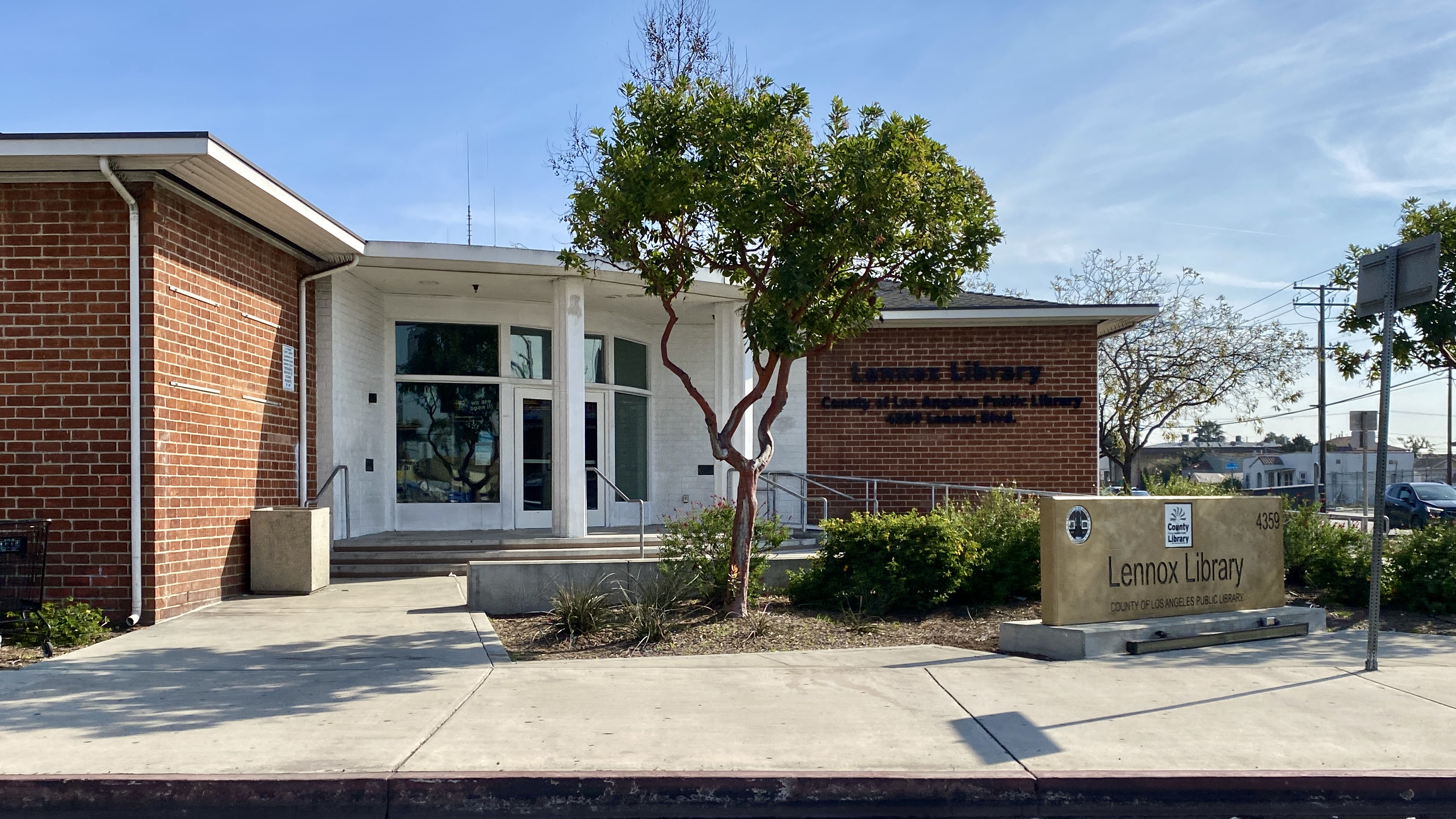
Lennox branch of the LA County Library

The Los Angeles County Sheriff's Department (LASD) operates the South Los Angeles Station in West Athens, serving Lennox.

The Los Angeles County Department of Health Services operates the Curtis Tucker Health Center in Inglewood, serving Lennox.

== Flight path air pollution ==
In 2014, an air quality study found harmful ultrafine particles from the takeoffs and landings at Los Angeles International Airport to be much greater magnitude than previously thought.

== See also ==
- South Central Los Angeles
