= West Athens, California =

Unincorporated community in California, United States

- Census-designated place
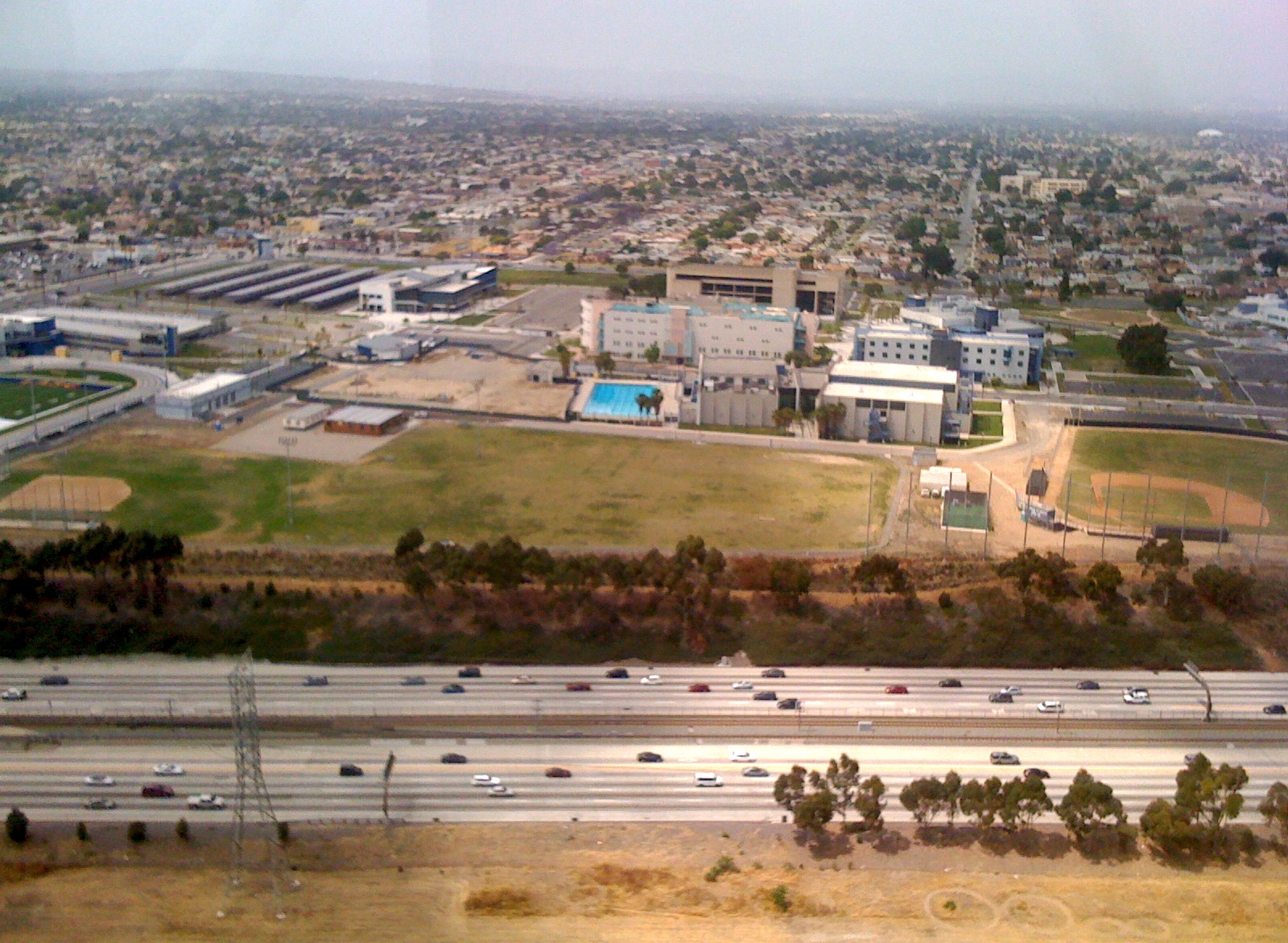
- Los Angeles Southwest College

- Location of West Athens in Los Angeles County, California

- Location in the United States
- Coordinates: 33°55′21″N 118°18′4″W
- Country: United States
- State: California
- County: Los Angeles

Area
  - Total: 1.337 sq mi (3.463 km^{2})
  - Land: 1.337 sq mi (3.463 km^{2})
  - Water: 0 sq mi (0 km^{2}) 0%
- Elevation: 190 ft (58 m)

Population (2020)
  - Total: 9,393
  - Density: 7,025/sq mi (2,712/km^{2})
- Time zone: UTC-8 (PST)
  - Summer (DST): UTC-7 (PDT)
- ZIP code: 90044, 90047
- Area code: 323/310
- FIPS code: 06-84116
- GNIS feature ID: 1867067

West Athens is a census-designated place (CDP) in Los Angeles County, California, United States. The population was 9,393 at the 2020 census. It is an unincorporated community within the 2nd Supervisorial District of Los Angeles County. West Athens is served by the Los Angeles County Sheriff's Department, operating out of the South Los Angeles Station. The approximate boundaries for West Athens are: 87th Street to the north, Vermont Avenue to the east, El Segundo Boulevard to the south, and approximately Western Avenue to Van Ness Avenue to the west. West Athens is predominantly residential, with commercial zoning along its main corridors. Los Angeles Southwest Community College lies within the West Athens neighborhood and city limits.

== History ==
Athens was platted and settled in the first decade of the 20th century. The area was initially marketed as Athens-on-the-Hill, apparently referring to two 200 ft (61 m) hills ("the eastmost summit is around 122nd and 124th, Broadway and Athens Way, and the westernmost summit is between 117th and 120th, S. Budlong and Vermont").

== Geography ==
West Athens is located at 33°55′21″N 118°18′4″W (33.922414, -118.301156).

According to the United States Census Bureau, the CDP has a total area of 1.3 square miles (3.4 km^{2}), all land. It borders Gardena to the south, Hawthorne to the west, Inglewood to the northwest, Westmont to the north, and the city of Los Angeles to the east.

== Demographics ==
Historical population
Census	Pop.	Note	%±
1970	13,286		—
1980	8,531		−35.8%
1990	8,859		3.8%
2000	9,101		2.7%
2010	8,729		−4.1%
2020	9,393		7.6%
U.S. Decennial Census; 1860–1870 1880-1890; 1900 1910 1920; 1930 1940 1950; 1960 1970 1980; 1990 2000 2010; 2020

West Athens first appeared as an unincorporated place in the 1970 U.S. census, and as a census designated place in the 1980 United States census.

=== Racial and ethnic composition ===
West Athens CDP, California – Racial and ethnic composition Note: the US Census treats Hispanic/Latino as an ethnic category. This table excludes Latinos from the racial categories and assigns them to a separate category. Hispanics/Latinos may be of any race.
Race / Ethnicity (NH = Non-Hispanic)	Pop 2000	Pop 2010	Pop 2020	% 2000	% 2010	% 2020
White alone (NH)	142	116	144	1.56%	1.33%	1.53%
Black or African American alone (NH)	5,049	4,492	4,473	55.48%	51.46%	47.62%
Native American or Alaska Native alone (NH)	9	8	24	0.10%	0.09%	0.26%
Asian alone (NH)	137	104	187	1.51%	1.19%	1.99%
Native Hawaiian or Pacific Islander alone (NH)	29	6	28	0.32%	0.07%	0.30%
Other race alone (NH)	43	53	82	0.47%	0.61%	0.87%
Mixed race or Multiracial (NH)	115	107	234	1.26%	1.23%	2.49%
Hispanic or Latino (any race)	3,577	3,843	4,221	39.30%	44.03%	44.94%
Total	9,101	8,729	9,393	100.00%	100.00%	100.00%

=== 2020 census ===
As of the 2020 census, West Athens had a population of 9,393. The median age was 36.0 years. 24.6% of residents were under the age of 18 and 13.7% of residents were 65 years of age or older. For every 100 females there were 92.1 males, and for every 100 females age 18 and over there were 87.7 males age 18 and over.

100.0% of residents lived in urban areas, while 0.0% lived in rural areas.

There were 2,850 households in West Athens, of which 39.5% had children under the age of 18 living in them. Of all households, 35.4% were married-couple households, 18.8% were households with a male householder and no spouse or partner present, and 38.4% were households with a female householder and no spouse or partner present. About 19.1% of all households were made up of individuals and 6.7% had someone living alone who was 65 years of age or older.

There were 2,942 housing units, of which 3.1% were vacant. The homeowner vacancy rate was 0.2% and the rental vacancy rate was 3.3%.

West Athens was no longer majority Black in 2020, leaving only two communities in California delineated by the U.S. Census Bureau with Black majority populations.

=== 2010 census ===
At the 2010 census West Athens had a population of 8,729. The population density was 6,531.5 inhabitants per square mile (2,521.8/km^{2}). The racial makeup of West Athens was 1,584 (18.1%) White (1.3% Non-Hispanic White), 4,578 (52.4%) African American, 31 (0.4%) Native American, 111 (1.3%) Asian, 10 (0.1%) Pacific Islander, 2,127 (24.4%) from other races, and 288 (3.3%) from two or more races. Hispanic or Latino of any race were 3,843 persons (44.0%).

The census reported that 8,674 people (99.4% of the population) lived in households, 50 (0.6%) lived in non-institutionalized group quarters, and 5 (0.1%) were institutionalized.

There were 2,525 households, 1,261 (49.9%) had children under the age of 18 living in them, 1,028 (40.7%) were opposite-sex married couples living together, 774 (30.7%) had a female householder with no husband present, 227 (9.0%) had a male householder with no wife present. There were 175 (6.9%) unmarried opposite-sex partnerships, and 10 (0.4%) same-sex married couples or partnerships. 378 households (15.0%) were one person and 138 (5.5%) had someone living alone who was 65 or older. The average household size was 3.44. There were 2,029 families (80.4% of households); the average family size was 3.77.

The age distribution was 2,539 people (29.1%) under the age of 18, 1,025 people (11.7%) aged 18 to 24, 2,275 people (26.1%) aged 25 to 44, 1,994 people (22.8%) aged 45 to 64, and 896 people (10.3%) who were 65 or older. The median age was 32.1 years. For every 100 females, there were 91.5 males. For every 100 females age 18 and over, there were 86.7 males.

There were 2,691 housing units at an average density of 2,013.5 per square mile, of the occupied units 1,328 (52.6%) were owner-occupied and 1,197 (47.4%) were rented. The homeowner vacancy rate was 1.8%; the rental vacancy rate was 8.4%. 4,427 people (50.7% of the population) lived in owner-occupied housing units and 4,247 people (48.7%) lived in rental housing units.

According to the 2010 United States Census, West Athens had a median household income of $46,391, with 23.6% of the population living below the federal poverty line.

=== 2000 census ===
At the 2000 census there were 9,101 people, 2,573 households, and 2,102 families in the CDP. The population density was 6,784.4 inhabitants per square mile (2,619.5/km^{2}). There were 2,673 housing units at an average density of 1,992.6 per square mile (769.3/km^{2}). The racial makeup of the CDP was 12.9% White, 65.1% African American, 0.6% Native American, 1.6% Asian, 0.4% Pacific Islander, 25.1% from other races, and 3.3% from two or more races. Hispanic or Latino people of any race were 25.3%.

Of the 2,573 households 45.7% had children under the age of 18 living with them, 45.4% were married couples living together, 28.4% had a female householder with no husband present, and 18.3% were non-families. 14.2% of households were one person and 4.5% were one person aged 65 or older. The average household size was 3.54 and the average family size was 3.83.

The age distribution was 35.1% under the age of 18, 10.3% from 18 to 24, 28.3% from 25 to 44, 19.0% from 45 to 64, and 7.3% 65 or older. The median age was 28 years. For every 100 females, there were 89.6 males. For every 100 females age 18 and over, there were 86.7 males.

The median household income was $35,423 and the median family income was $39,028. Males had a median income of $27,484 versus $31,750 for females. The per capita income for the CDP was $12,903. About 24.0% of families and 25.8% of the population were below the poverty line, including 35.9% of those under age 18 and 18.6% of those age 65 or over.

== Education ==
West Athens is served by the Los Angeles Unified School District.

=== Schools ===
Public schools in West Athens:

- West Athens Elementary School
- Ánimo Legacy Charter Middle School of Green Dot Public Schools
  - Formerly: Clay Middle School - Later converted into Green Dot charter middle schools which take students from the ex-Clay attendance boundary.

West Athens is zoned to:

- Washington Preparatory High School in Westmont

Alternative schools:

- Middle College High School, on the property of Los Angeles Southwest College

=== Colleges ===
- Los Angeles Southwest College

== Infrastructure ==
=== Emergency services ===
The Los Angeles County Sheriff's Department (LASD) operates the South Los Angeles Station serving West Athens. It also operates the Audrey & Sydney Irmas Youth Activity Center in West Athens.

== Government ==
In the California State Legislature, West Athens is in the 35th senatorial district, represented by Democrat Laura Richardson, and in the 61st Assembly district, represented by Democrat Tina McKinnor.

In the United States House of Representatives, West Athens is in California's 43rd congressional district, represented by Democrat Maxine Waters.

== Newspapers ==
- Morningside Park Chronicle is an unincorporated community newspaper based in Morningside Park that also covers the West Athens area.

== See also ==
- Athens, California
