= Middle College High School (Los Angeles) =

Coordinates: 33.930590°N 118.307077°W

Information
- School type: Alternative High School
- School district: Los Angeles Unified School District
- Enrollment: c.340
- Website: mckennamchs.lausd.org

Middle College High School is an alternative high school of the Los Angeles Unified School District, located on the property of Los Angeles Southwest College, in West Athens, California, with a Los Angeles postal address. The school serves approximately 340 students.
