= George J. McKenna III =

American politician and former educator

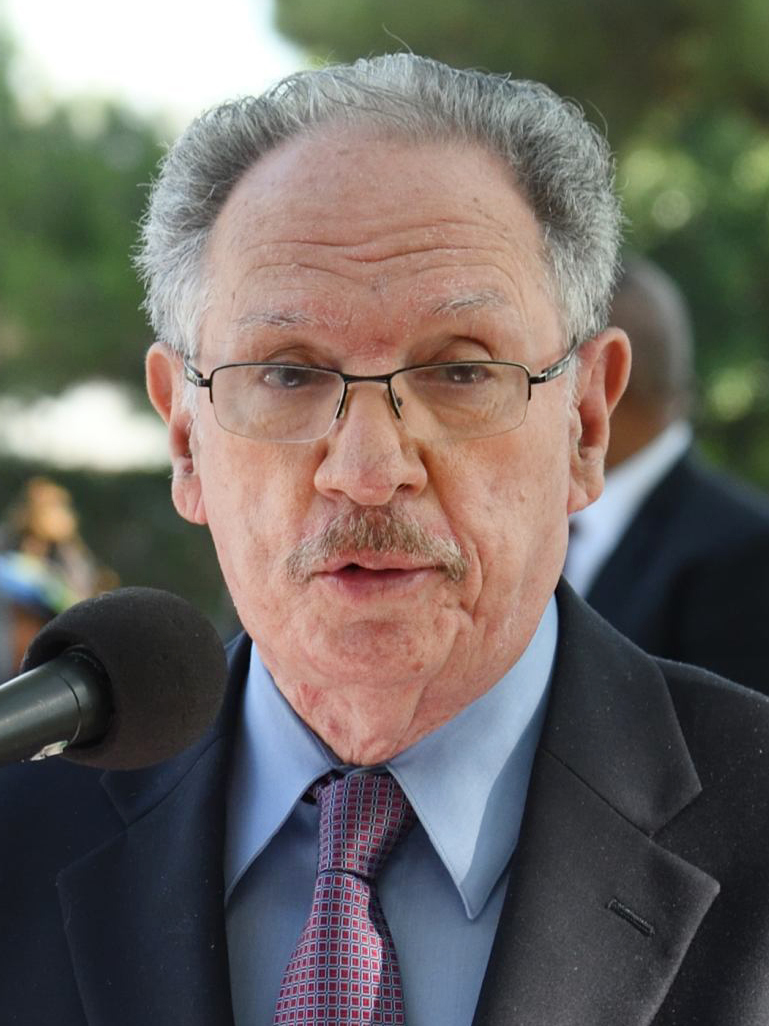
- McKenna in 2021

Member of the LAUSD Board of Education from the 1st district
- In office August 28, 2014 – December 9, 2024
- Preceded by: Marguerite LaMotte
- Succeeded by: Sherlett Hendy Newbill

Vice President of the LAUSD Board of Education
- In office July 1, 2015 – July 6, 2017
- President: Steve Zimmer
- Preceded by: Steve Zimmer
- Succeeded by: Nick Melvoin

Personal details
- Born: September 6, 1940 (age 86) New Orleans, Louisiana
- Party: Democratic
- Education: Xavier University of Louisiana (BMath, EdD); Loyola Marymount University (MA)

George J. McKenna III (born September 6, 1940) is an American former politician and educator who served as a member of the Los Angeles Unified School District Board of Education for District 1 from 2014 until 2024. Prior to his board tenure, McKenna served as the principal of George Washington Preparatory High School. During his tenure, he led reforms to address issues related to gang violence in the school. His initiatives at the school were recounted in the 1986 biographical film The George McKenna Story where he was portrayed by Denzel Washington.

By 1988, he was appointed to the Inglewood Unified School District as the superintendent, where he was later ousted from the District due to him clashing with the board. He served in various capacities in different school districts including on the Compton Unified School District and the Pasadena Unified School District. In 2014, he won a special election to succeed Marguerite LaMotte on the Los Angeles Unified School District Board of Education after she died, serving until he announced his retirement in 2024.

== Early life and education ==
George J. McKenna III was born on September 6, 1940 in New Orleans, Louisiana. He pursued his undergraduate studies at Xavier University of Louisiana, earning a Bachelor of Mathematics degree at the age of 20. Later, he earned a Doctor of Education degree from the same university. He furthered his education by attending Loyola Law School, where he was awarded a teaching fellowship and earned a master's degree in mathematics.

== Early career and film ==
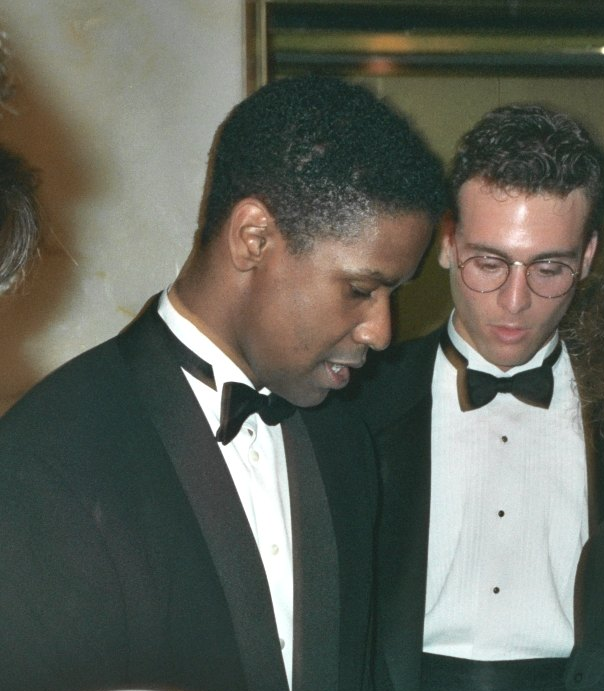
Actor Denzel Washington portrayed McKenna in the 1986 television film The George McKenna Story.

In 1964, McKenna took a teaching position at David Starr Jordan High School in Watts, Los Angeles, with the Watts riots taking place a year after and inspiring him to have an interest in serving the school system. In 1979, McKenna assumed the role of principal at Washington High School in Westmont, California, which faced challenges with low academic performance, frequent student absences, and gang violence. Throughout his tenure as principal, he successfully reformed the school to a point where nearly eighty percent of its graduates pursued higher education. McKenna's time as school principal was praised and was given national acclaim, with his actions being depicted in the 1986 television film The George McKenna Story, where he was portrayed by Denzel Washington. He participated in the movie's ending scene, where he narrates the changes to the school because of the efforts of the community. The movie was praised for Washington's depiction of McKenna and for showcasing the reforms that were installed in the school.

In 1988, McKenna was appointed as the superintendent of the Inglewood Unified School District, riding on the popularity of the film. While superintendent, he clashed with the board on various issues. By September 1993, the Inglewood Unified School District Board announced that they would not renew his contract. Some of the members of the Board of Education called his actions arrogant, blaming him for deficits that the districts was facing at the time, and he lost a no-confidence vote. In 1994, the Compton Unified School District hired McKenna as deputy superintendent, an office he would hold until 2001. In June 2000, he was appointed as Superintendent of the 1st Subdistrict for the Los Angeles Unified School District created by Superintendent Ramón C. Cortines. From 2001 until 2008, he was an assistant Superintendent for the Pasadena Unified School District.

== LAUSD Board of Education ==
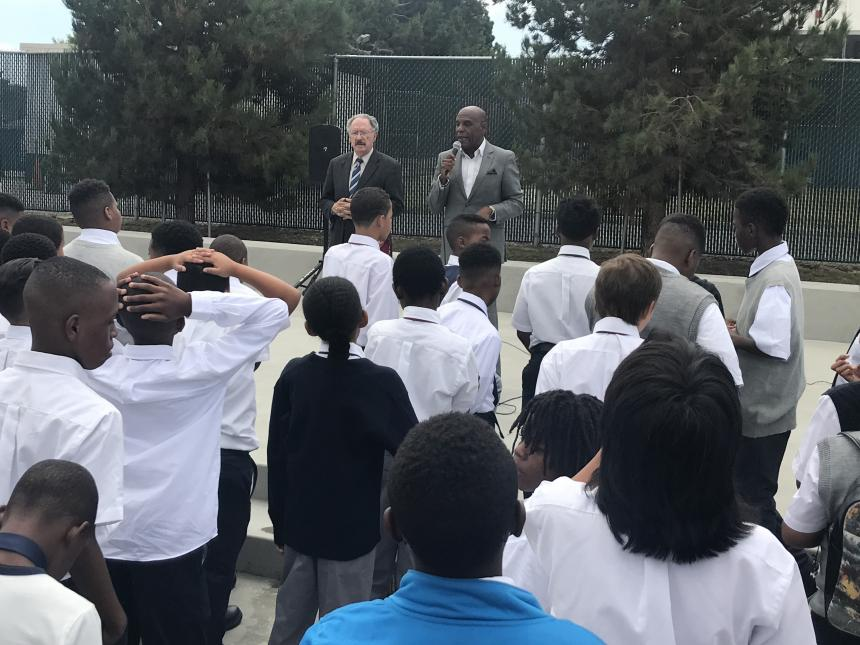
McKenna (left) with State Senator Steven Bradford speaking to students in 2017.

On December 5, 2013, longtime Los Angeles Unified School District board member Marguerite Poindexter LaMotte died, with supporters rallying around McKenna to be appointed to her seat. The board decided to call for a special election to fill her seat, with her successor having to run again for the regular 2014 election. In the primary election, McKenna and education policy advisor Alex Johnson emerged as the top two candidates, advancing to the runoff. McKenna won against Johnson in the subsequent runoff election with low turnout. He was sworn into office by Jesse Jackson and won re-election unopposed that next year. His inauguration was attended by U.S. Representative Maxine Waters and civil rights activist Danny Bakewell.

In November 2014, McKenna and board members Bennett Kayser and Steve Zimmer proposed a resolution to require ethnic studies courses in its high schools, which was approved by the Board. On July 1, 2015, McKenna was named as the Vice President of the Board of Education by newly-elected President Steve Zimmer. He was replaced by Nick Melvoin after Melvoin's election to the board on July 6, 2017, as he defeated President Zimmer in the 2017 election. In September 2019, McKenna helped to launch the Los Angeles County Metropolitan Transportation Authority pass program for K-12 students in the LAUSD. He was re-elected to the Board in that next year, running unopposed again. In February 2024, McKenna announced his decision not to pursue re-election for the upcoming 2024 election. He endorsed senior aide Sherlett Hendy Newbill to take over for his seat in the 2024 election, and she was elected to succeed him.

== Personal life ==
McKenna lives in the Crenshaw district of Los Angeles. In 1989, McKenna received the Congressional Black Caucus’ Chairman’s Award and was later inducted into the National Alliance of Black School Educators’ Hall of Fame in 1997. He was honored by Loyola Law School with a Johnnie L. Cochran Jr. Public Service Award in March 2017.

== Electoral history ==
Electoral history of Kevin Kiley
Year	Office	Party	Primary			General			Result	Swing	Ref.
Year	Office	Party	Total	%	P.	Total	%	P.	Result	Swing	Ref.
2014	LAUSD Board of Education (1st)	Nonpartisan	19,803	44.56%	1st	17,025	52.81%	1st	Won	N/A	
2015	LAUSD Board of Education (1st)	Nonpartisan	28,456	100.00%	1st	Runoff cancelled			Won	N/A	
2020	LAUSD Board of Education (1st)	Nonpartisan	107,280	100.00%	1st	Runoff cancelled			Won	N/A	
