= Alexander Russo =

Alexander Russo may refer to:

- Alexander Russo (writer), education writer
- Alexander Russo (athlete) (born 1994), Brazilian track and field sprinter
