= Lenox School District =

Lenox School District may refer to:

- Lenox Public Schools in Lenox, Massachusetts
- Lenox Community School District in Iowa
- Lennox School District (with two "n"s) in California
- New Lenox School District 122 in Illinois
- Lennox School District 41-4 in South Dakota
