= Ánimo Venice Charter High School =

Coordinates: 33.996586°N 118.463014°W

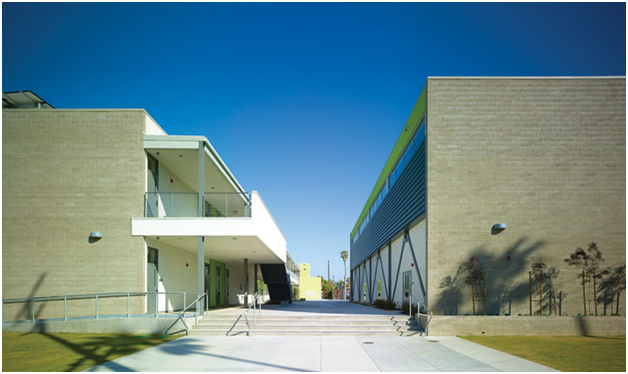

Location
- 820 Broadway Street; Venice, California 90291; United States

Information
- Established: 2004
- Status: Permanently Closed
- Closed: June 30th, 2026
- Oversight: Green Dot Public Schools
- Principal: Julio Murcia
- Teaching staff: 24.00 (FTE)
- Grades: 9-12
- Enrollment: 265 (2025-26)
- Average class size: 28
- Student to teacher ratio: 25.21
- Hours in school day: 6.5-7.5 hours(Depends on the Day)
- Campus type: High School
- Colors: Beige and Blue
- Slogan: Preparing students for college, leadership, and life
- Athletics: Cross country, boys basketball, girls basketball, boys soccer, girls soccer, softball, baseball, girls volleyball
- Mascot: Pirate
- Website: http://www.greendot.org/venice/

Ánimo Venice Charter High School was a public charter school in Venice, Los Angeles, United States, which originally opened in 2004. Its mascot is a pirate, and it is operated by Green Dot Public Schools. It shut down in 2026.

== History ==
Due in part to the success of Animo Leadership Charter High School, Ánimo Venice Charter High School was established as the fifth Green Dot school. It opened in August 2002 with 145 students, adding a freshman class of 140 every year until 2006, when it reached its full capacity of approximately 525 students.

Classes began in fall 2004 in a sectioned-off portion of the playground of Broadway Elementary School in Venice. The school moved in 2006 to the former Ninety-Eighth Street Elementary School campus in Los Angeles, which had mostly recently been occupied by Renaissance Academy.

Animo Venice Charter High School officially closed permanently on June 30, 2026 due to a low-attendance record.

== Curriculum ==
Freshmen are admitted through a lottery process; about 145 applicants to the school are accepted, and the remainder are placed on a waiting list.
