= Alexander Russo (writer) =

Alexander William Warburg Russo is an American freelance education writer whose blog, This Week In Education, was named one of the best education blogs by The Washington Post for 2010. He is also a Spencer Fellow at the Journalism School of Columbia University.

== Personal life ==
He is the son of American jazz composer William Russo and his second wife, Jeremy Warburg. His mother is a granddaughter of Vanity Fair publisher Conde Nast and German-American banker Felix Warburg. He has two half sisters, Camille Blinstrub and Whitney Schildgen, and a full sister, Condée Nast Russo.

== Career ==
Russo is the editor of the 2004 volume School Reform In Chicago (Harvard Education Press) and the author of Stray Dogs, Saints, and Saviors (Jossey-Bass), a nonfiction account of the effort by Steve Barr and Green Dot Public Schools to revamp Locke High School, featured in the May 2009 New Yorker article "The Instigator".
