= Boys Academic Leadership Academy =

School in Westmont, California

Coordinates: 33.9361°N 118.3024°W

Information
- Established: 2017; 9 years ago
- Grades: 6-12
- Gender: Boys

Boys Academic Leadership Academy (BALA) is a grade 6–12 public school for boys located in Westmont, California, with a Los Angeles postal address. A part of the Los Angeles Unified School District (LAUSD), BALA is on the property of George Washington Preparatory High School (Washington Prep). The school has a STEAM focus.

== History ==
After LAUSD opened Girls Academic Leadership Academy, a school for girls, the district decided that in order to obey rules from the federal government which barred discrimination on the basis of gender, the district should also operate a dedicated magnet school for male students. The projected initial enrollment was 200. The inspiration was Eagle Academy for Young Men.

It opened in 2017, and it was the district's first all-male school. Originally the school only had the 6th grade and the 7th grade.

== School uniforms ==
The school uniform includes neckties.
