= Lennox High School =

Defunct school in Lennox, California, United States

Lennox High School was a high school of the Centinela Valley Union High School District, located in Lennox, California, in the Los Angeles metropolitan area.

The former property is 32 acres (13 ha) in size, and had up to 1,300 students. The school was above flight paths to Los Angeles International Airport, and accordingly experienced aircraft noise. Most of the students were Hispanic and Latino Americans.

By 1977 the board members of the Centinela Valley school district argued that it would cost too much money to reduce the volume of sound at the school, and so they voted to close it. Activists created protests against the closure of Lennox High. That year, there was a proposal to transfer it to the Lennox School District so it could be repurposed as a middle school.

The dispute went to the legal system. Terry J. Hatter Jr., a judge in the federal court system, ordered the school closed in 1982 and stated that it could never be used for senior high school purposes after that point. One issue of the dispute was that the other two high schools in the school district, Hawthorne High School and Leuzinger High School, were majority non-Hispanic white, while Lennox was majority Hispanic, and keeping Lennox open would keep racial segregation in place. By the time Lennox High permanently closed, enrollment was below 100.

In 1985 the campus was scheduled to reopen as Lennox Middle School, under the Lennox School District and now with material to reduce the sound volume. Unlike the Centinela Valley district, all of the Lennox elementary district schools were, by that time, majority racial minorities. Additionally, the public did not emphasize desegregation as much by the time 1985 occurred. These two factors meant that no legal efforts to stop the use of the school as a middle school has occurred.

In 1988 an organization founded by parents who were campaigning for keeping Lennox High open dissolved and gave a scholarship for use by the Centinela Valley district.
