= Girls Academic Leadership Academy =

School in Los Angeles, California

Coordinates: 34°03′19″N 118°19′53″W

Girls Academic Leadership Academy: Dr. Michelle King School for STEM (GALA) is a public grade 6–12 all girls' school in Mid-City, Los Angeles. It is a part of the Los Angeles Unified School District. Mathematics and science are specialty fields of the school. It is named after Michelle King, a Los Angeles educator.

== History ==
Circa 2013 the district began planning to establish the school. Initially it was to have grades 6 through 9. The school opened in 2016. The district planned to open an all boys' school to comply with Title IX, resulting in Boys Academic Leadership Academy opening the following year.
