= Hillcrest High School (Memphis, Tennessee) =

Public high school in Tennessee, United States

Coordinates: 35.03438°N 90.01449°W

- 4184 Graceland Dr; Memphis, Tennessee 38116; United States

Information
- School type: Public high school
- School district: Green Dot Public Schools
- Teaching staff: 20.00 (FTE)
- Enrollment: 441 (2023–2024)
- Student to teacher ratio: 22.05
- Colors: Kelly green and white
- Mascot: Vikings
- Website: https://tn.greendot.org/hillcrest/

Hillcrest High School is a public high school (grades 9–12), located in Memphis, Tennessee and is served by the Green Dot Public Schools system. The school has an enrollment of 525 students. The vast majority of students are African American. The school was previously operated by Memphis City Schools district, after MCS merged with the Shelby County Schools in July 2013.

== School colors, mascot, and uniforms ==
The school colors for Hillcrest High School are Kelly Green and White and the mascot is Vikings.

== Notable alumni ==
- Alex Atkins, assistant football coach, Florida State University
- Gangsta Boo, gangsta rapper, former member 3 6 Mafia
