= The George McKenna Story =

1986 television film directed by Eric Laneuville

- Film poster made for re-release under the title Hard Lessons
- Genre: Biography; Drama
- Written by: Charles Eric Johnson
- Directed by: Eric Laneuville
- Starring: Denzel Washington; Lynn Whitfield
- Music by: Herbie Hancock
- Country of origin: United States
- Original language: English

Production
- Executive producer: Howard Lipstone
- Producer: Linda Otto
- Production location: Houston
- Cinematography: Isidore Mankofsky
- Editor: Robin Wilson
- Running time: 93 minutes
- Production company: Landsburg Company

Original release
- Network: CBS
- Release: November 11, 1986

The George McKenna Story is a 1986 biographical television film directed by Eric Laneuville, which stars Laneuville's St. Elsewhere co-star Denzel Washington and Lynn Whitfield. It involves the events at George Washington Preparatory High School in South Los Angeles. The film was later (after Denzel Washington became a superstar) re-released on video under the title Hard Lessons.

== Cast ==
- Denzel Washington as School Principal George McKenna
- Lynn Whitfield as Bobbie Maxwell
- Earl Billings as Mr. Rogers
- Ray Buktenica as Alan Keith
- Akosua Busia as Cynthia Byers
- Richard Masur as Ben Proctor
- Michael Milburn as Brimm Leader

== Reception ==
The George McKenna Story won a Christopher Award in the category of "Television Specials".

At Rotten Tomatoes the film received two negative reviews from critics.
