= Mulholland League =

High school athletic league

The Mulholland League is a high school athletic league that is part of the CIF Southern Section. Members are charter and independent schools located in and around Los Angeles.

== Members ==
- Ambassador Christian
- Ánimo Leadership Charter High School
- Compton Early College
- Environmental Charter High School
- Price School
- Shalhevet High School
- Summit View West School
