= Oliver Ross (offensive lineman) =

American football player (born 1974)

No. 68, 77, 79
- Positions: Tackle, guard

Personal information
- Born: September 27, 1974 (age 52); Culver City, California, U.S.
- Listed height: 6 ft 4 in (1.93 m)
- Listed weight: 327 lb (148 kg)

Career information
- High school: Washington (Los Angeles, California)
- College: L.A. Southwest JC(CA); Iowa State
- NFL draft: 1998: 5th round, 138th overall pick

Career history
- Dallas Cowboys (1998); Philadelphia Eagles (1999); Chicago Bears (2000)*; Pittsburgh Steelers (2000–2004); → Amsterdam Admirals (2000); Arizona Cardinals (2005–2007); New England Patriots (2008); Arizona Cardinals (2009)*
- * Offseason or practice squad member only

Career NFL statistics
- Games played: 89
- Games started: 53
- Fumble recoveries: 3
- Stats at Pro Football Reference

Oliver Calvin Ross (born September 27, 1974) is an American former professional football player who was an offensive lineman in the National Football League (NFL) for the Dallas Cowboys, Philadelphia Eagles, Pittsburgh Steelers, New England Patriots and Arizona Cardinals. He played college football for the Iowa State Cyclones and was selected by the Dallas Cowboys in the fifth round of the 1998 NFL draft.

== Early life ==
Ross attended Washington Preparatory High School, where he received All-Conference honors as a two-way tackle. He moved on to L.A. Southwest Community College, earning the starting position at defensive tackle as a freshman. The next year, he registered 11 starts, 66 tackles, 9 sacks and a forced fumble, while receiving All-Southern California Western States Conference honors.

As a junior, he transferred to Iowa State University, where he was a backup defensive tackle, appearing in 2 games and not recording any tackles. In 1996, he was redshirted in order to convert him into an offensive tackle.

As a senior, he earned the starter position at left tackle, helping the team average 228.6 passing yards-per-game.

== Professional career ==
Pre-draft measurables
Height	Weight	Arm length	Hand span	40-yard dash	10-yard split	20-yard split	20-yard shuttle	Three-cone drill	Vertical jump	Broad jump	Bench press
6 ft 4 3/8 in (1.94 m)	301 lb (137 kg)	35 1/4 in (0.90 m)	9 1/2 in (0.24 m)	5.21 s	1.83 s	3.01 s	4.59 s	8.15 s	26.5 in (0.67 m)	8 ft 1 in (2.46 m)	24 reps
All values from NFL Combine

=== Dallas Cowboys ===
The Dallas Cowboys traded their sixth (#162-Carl Hansen) and seventh-round (#197-Jason McEndoo) picks to the Seattle Seahawks in exchange for a fifth-round pick (138th overall) in the 1998 NFL draft to select Ross. Because he was considered a raw prospect at offensive tackle, he needed more development time and played in just 2 games, as an extra tight end in short yardage situations. He was released on September 5, 1999.

=== Philadelphia Eagles ===
On September 8, 1999, he was signed by the Philadelphia Eagles to their practice squad. On September 13, he was promoted to the active roster, but was kept inactive during the last 15 games of the season. In 2000, the team assigned him to the Amsterdam Admirals of the NFL Europe. He was released on August 27, 2000.

=== Pittsburgh Steelers ===
On November 22, 2000, he was signed to the Pittsburgh Steelers' practice squad and eventually promoted to the active roster on December 13. In 2001, he played in all 16 games and had the first 8 career starts of his professional career, filling in for players who were injured at right guard, right tackle and left tackle.

Ross was signed to a restricted free agent offer sheet by the Cleveland Browns in 2002, but the Steelers matched it, signing him through the 2004 season. In 2003, he was expected to be the starter at right tackle, but was passed on the depth chart by Todd Fordham in a close competition, before regaining it for the final 9 games of the season. In 2004, he started every game at right tackle.

From 2001 to 2004, he played in all 64 games, totaling 35 starts, playing both the guard and tackle positions.

=== Arizona Cardinals (first stint) ===
On March 4, 2005, he was signed by the Arizona Cardinals as an unrestricted free agent, starting 11 games at right tackle, one at left tackle and missing 4 games with a broken bone in his hand. In 2006, he had surgery to fix a preseason right knee injury, but was still able to play in 11 games with five starts. He missed the entire 2007 season with a torn left triceps. He was released on February 21, 2008.

=== New England Patriots ===
On June 2, 2008, he signed as an unrestricted free agent with the New England Patriots, but never played any games for the team. He began training camp on the PUP list with a shoulder injury, before being placed on the injured reserve list and was eventually released on October 28.

=== Arizona Cardinals (second stint) ===
On May 4, 2009, he was signed by the Arizona Cardinals as an unrestricted free agent, reuniting him with Ken Whisenhunt and Russ Grimm, who were his coaches with the Pittsburgh Steelers. He was released before the season started on September 4.
