= Lennox Mathematics, Science & Technology Academy =

Charter high school in California, United States

Coordinates: 33°56′7″N 118°21′6″W

Lennox Mathematics, Science & Technology Academy (LMSTA) is a charter high school located in Lennox, California, USA. It specializes in mathematics, science and technology for ninth to twelfth grade pupils. In its 2009 rankings, U.S. News & World Report ranked it 21st out of 21,000 US High Schools. The school has continued to perform highly in subsequent editions of the rankings, scoring 25th and making the Gold Medal List in the most recent version of the report. The academy also uses a scanning system where they deduct points for irresponsible and disruptive conduct and add points for showing responsibility and their school motto FAMILIA, GANAS Y ORGULLO. The scanning system is done through Hero.
