= Shalhevet High School =

Modern Orthodox high school in Los Angeles, California

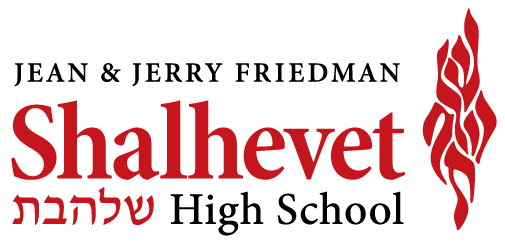

Location
- 910 South Fairfax Avenue; Los Angeles, California 90036; United States; 34.059220°N 118.362825°W

Information
- Type: Independent
- Motto: Ignite the Flame
- Established: 1992
- Founder: Jerry Friedman
- NCES School ID: BB944617
- Principal: Daniel Weslow
- Head of school: David Block
- Teaching staff: 48.8 (on an FTE basis)
- Grades: 9–12
- Enrollment: 259 (2020-2021)
- Student to teacher ratio: 5.3
- Colors: Red and Black
- Athletics conference: Mulholland League
- Nickname: Firehawks
- Newspaper: The Boiling Point
- Website: www.shalhevet.org

The Jean and Jerry Friedman Shalhevet High School is a co-educational, college-preparatory, Modern Orthodox Jewish high school in Los Angeles, California, United States.

== Background information ==
The demographic breakdown of the 254 students enrolled in 2017-18 was approximately 98.4% white and 1.6% multiracial. The cost to attend Shalhevet is approximately $44,250, plus fees.

== Activities ==
Shalhevet's school newspaper is The Boiling Point. It has won national awards from the National Scholastic Press Association, Columbia Scholastic Press Association, and Quill & Scroll International Honorary Journalism Society. It runs on an operating budget of US$10,000, and an advertising budget of US$2,200. The paper went through a structural reboot in 2010, and since then has seen an explosion in activity. The paper can publish up to 8 issues in a school year.

== Controversy ==
On June 14, 2017, Shalhevet caused a break between the more traditional wing of Modern Orthodox Judaism and its progressive faction by hiring Ramie Smith as a part of its Judaic Studies department. Smith had received semikhah (ordination) from Maharat, the first Orthodox Jewish institution to provide an ordination to women. She received semikhah in 2016. Head of School Ari Segal released a statement to respond to pushback, saying "While we recognize this legitimate point of contention, at this juncture, our priority is focused squarely on the quality of our education. Ramie is a superstar, plain and simple." Incoming head of YULA Girls school Joshua Spodek protested because this hiring was a break from Orthodox tradition, and that YULA Girls should be a feeder school for women's yeshivot.

== Notable alumni ==
- David Mazouz, actor
