= Louie Walker =

American football player (born 1952)

No. 57
- Position: Linebacker

Personal information
- Born: July 23, 1952 (age 74); Los Angeles, California, U.S.
- Listed height: 6 ft 1 in (1.85 m)
- Listed weight: 216 lb (98 kg)

Career information
- High school: Washington (Los Angeles)
- College: Colorado State
- NFL draft: 1974: undrafted

Career history
- Dallas Cowboys (1974); San Francisco 49ers (1975)*
- * Offseason or practice squad member only

Career NFL statistics
- Games played: 8
- Stats at Pro Football Reference

Louis Walker Jr. (born July 23, 1952) is an American former professional football player who was a linebacker in the National Football League (NFL) for the Dallas Cowboys. He played college football for the Colorado State Rams.

== Early life ==
Walker attended Washington Preparatory High School, where he was a two-time All-league linebacker. He also practiced track and swimming.

He enrolled at West Los Angeles Junior College, where he played as a fullback and linebacker. He was a two-time All-conference linebacker.

Walker transferred after his sophomore season to Colorado State University, where he was a two-year starter at linebacker.

As a senior, he had 75 tackles (second on the team) and one interception.

== Professional career ==
=== Dallas Cowboys ===
Walker was signed as an undrafted free agent by the Dallas Cowboys after the 1974 NFL draft. He missed the last 3 preseason games with an injury. He was waived before the start of the season. On October 21, he was re-signed to take the place of an injured Rodrigo Barnes on the roster. He played in the last 8 games of the season, focusing on special teams.

On August 6, 1975, he was traded to the San Francisco 49ers in exchange for an unspecified amount of cash.

=== San Francisco 49ers ===
On September 2, 1975, he was released before the start of the season.
