= Ambassador Christian School =

Location
- 2300 Crenshaw Blvd, Bldg B Torrance, California 90501; United States
- Coordinates: 33°49′28″N 118°19′38″W

Information
- Type: Private Christian high school
- Established: 2013
- Superintendent: Steven E. Keller
- Principal: Michael Barker
- Grades: 6-12
- Colors: Cardinal, Gold, and White
- Athletics conference: Mulholland League
- Nickname: Lions
- Accreditation: Western Association of Schools and Colleges
- Website: www.ambassadorhigh.org

Ambassador Christian School (ACS), formerly Ambassador High School, is a Christian middle and high school in Torrance, California. The school was established in 2013 by Michael Barker.

In 2015, a team from Ambassador High School developed an experiment about the usage of wind as a means of pollination in microgravity. This experiment was launched to the International Space Station.
