= Eagle Academy for Young Men =

Coordinates: 40.8453°N 73.8973°W

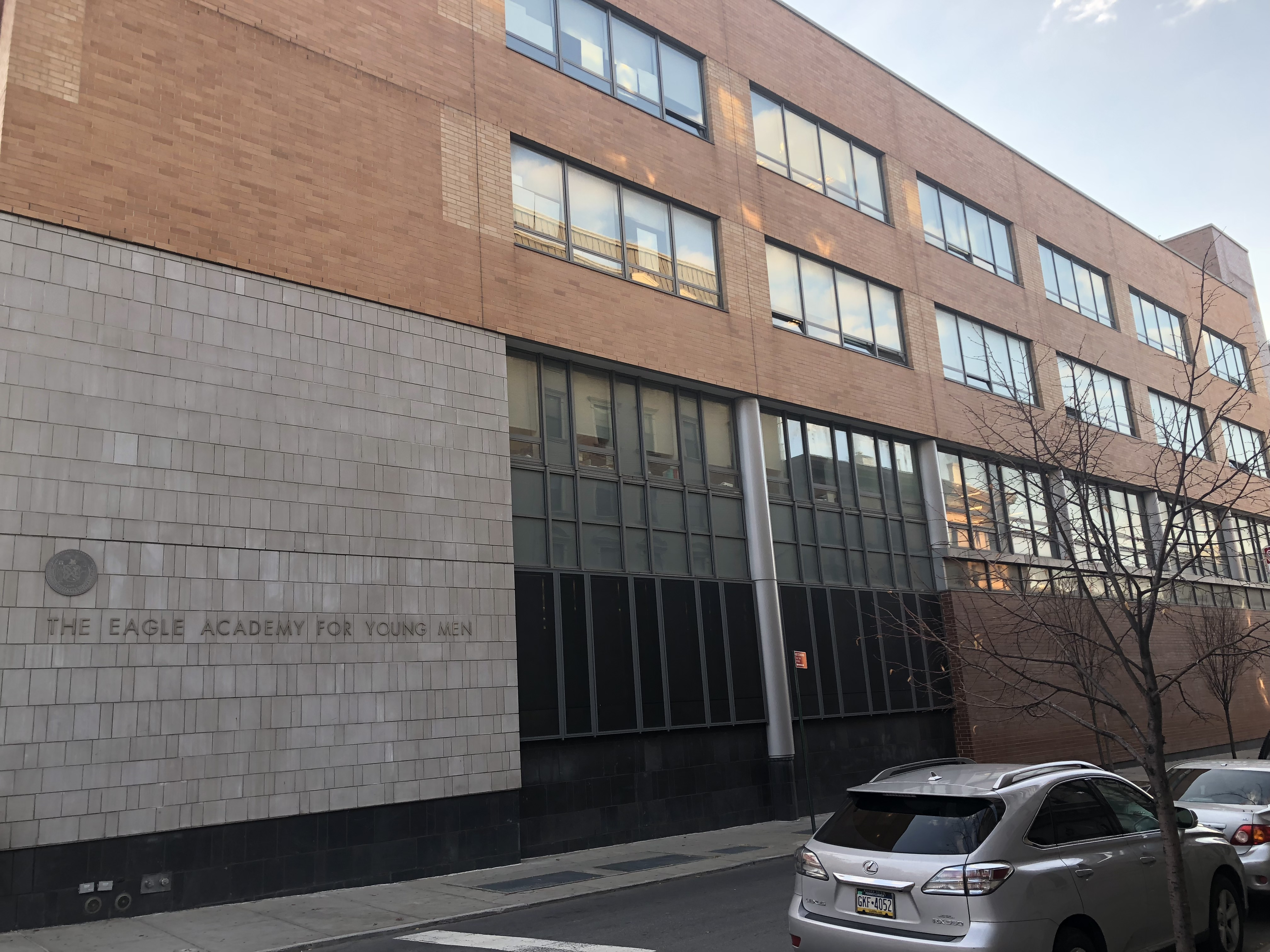
- The Bronx, New York City, New York; United States

Information
- Established: 2004; 22 years ago
- Gender: Boys
- Website: www.eaglebronx.org

The Eagle Academy for Young Men is an American all-boys' public secondary school in the Bronx borough of New York City, New York. A part of the New York City Department of Education, it opened in 2004, established by the 100 Black Men of America organization.

The school, intended to primarily serve Latino/Hispanic and black boys, is a part of the Eagle Academy network of schools, which has campuses in other New York City boroughs and Newark, New Jersey.

The Eagle group of boys' schools was the inspiration of Boys Academic Leadership Academy in Los Angeles.

== Student body ==
As of 2014, 62% of the students were black and 35% were Hispanic/Latino. 80% of the students were on free or reduced lunch.
