= George Washington Preparatory High School =

Public secondary school in Westmont, Los Angeles, California

Location
- 10860 South Denker Avenue; Westmont (Los Angeles postal address), California 90047; 33°56′14″N 118°18′15″W

Information
- Type: Public Secondary
- Motto: Worthy deeds, harmoniously, achieved.
- Established: 1926
- School district: Los Angeles Unified School District
- Principal: Tony Booker
- Staff: 48.01 (FTE)
- Grades: 9–12
- Enrollment: 888 (2017-18)
- Student to teacher ratio: 18.50
- Colors: Cardinal Red; Continental Blue
- Athletics conference: Marine League; CIF Los Angeles City Section
- Nickname: Generals
- Website: washingtonprephs.lausd.org

George Washington Preparatory High School is a public four-year high school of Los Angeles Unified School District in Los Angeles County, California, United States. It is located in the Westmont census-designated place and has a Los Angeles postal address.

Founded in 1926, the school has a Los Angeles address but is not located in the city limits of Los Angeles. The mascot is the General, a reference to the school's namesake George Washington. The school colors are red and blue. The school serves many areas in South Los Angeles and unincorporated areas around South Los Angeles, including Athens, West Athens and Westmont. In addition it serves the LAUSD section of Hawthorne.

It was the location for a 1986 TV movie Hard Lessons, depicting Denzel Washington as the new principal, who sets out to rid the school of gang violence and drugs and restore educational values to the school. The current principal is Tony Booker. Two famous former principals are George McKenna, whom Denzel Washington portrayed in the movie Hard Lessons; and past LAUSD Board Member Marguerite LaMotte.

== History ==
George Washington Preparatory High School was founded in 1927 as a six-year high school that slowly developed into a four-year school. The first graduating class was 1928 with 5 seniors. The school was badly damaged by the 1933 Long Beach earthquake and the students went to school in tents for a year or two. In 1935 Washington High began accepting 11th and 12th graders only, and before 1950, Washington Senior High School had expanded to include grades 10 through 12.

It was in the Los Angeles City High School District until 1961, when it merged into LAUSD.

In January 1983, a new founder, the famed George McKenna, redefined Washington High School as a college preparatory school, and George Washington Preparatory High School, "The Prep," became an academic institution for grades 9–12.

=== Background ===
The reorganization of Washington Preparatory High School into Small Learning Communities (SLCs) began in 2006. The purpose of the SLC is to develop a sense of unity and cohesiveness and to foster the individual needs of students. The SLCs that were established as a result of this effort are: Etech (Engineering and Technology); ELMS (Ethics, Leadership, and Mediation Scholars); S.T.A.R.S (Visual and Performing Arts); BIZ (Business); SHAPE (Health and Fitness); and Law and Justice. The three Magnet programs have remained intact. During subsequent years, Washington added Performing Arts, Math/Science, and Communication Arts Magnets and achieved honors in scholastic, athletic and extra-curricular competition. As of 2009, in order to graduate and participate in senior activities such as prom, senior picnic, and grad night seniors must earn 230 credits, pass the California High School Exit Exam, and maintain 95% attendance.

== Campus ==
In 2017, Boys Academic Leadership Academy opened on the Washington Prep campus.

== Demographics ==
During the 2008–09 school year, there were a total of 2,440 students attending the high school.

- 52.4% Black, 46.7% Hispanic, 0.2% White, 0.2% Native American, 0.1% Asian, 0.3% Pacific Islander

== Notable alumni ==
- Carol Adams, actress and dancer
- Estes Banks, NFL running back
- Barbara Billingsley, television and film actress
- Eddie Bressoud, Major League Baseball
- Steve Bryant, National Football League
- Raphel Cherry, NFL defensive back
- Don Clark, NFL offensive guard
- Dick Dale, surf guitarist
- Clarence Davis, NFL running back
- Kori Dickerson, NFL tight end
- Drakeo the Ruler, rapper
- Karl Farmer, NFL wide receiver
- Mark Fields, NFL linebacker
- Gil Garcetti, L.A. County DA
- Teresa Graves, American actress and singer.
- Ice Cube, rapper and actor
- Robert Illes, (television), Emmy winning Writer/producer
- Art Laboe, Disc Jockey
- James Lofton, NFL Hall of Fame wide receiver
- Hugh McElhenny, class of 1947, professional football player
- Jerry Norman, college basketball coach
- Eva Pigford, model and actress
- Oliver Ross, NFL offensive lineman
- Eddie Sheldrake, basketball player and restaurateur
- Ernie Shelton, NCAA champion high jumper, 1955–56
- Louie Walker, NFL linebacker
- Raymond Washington, American gangster
- Esther Williams, actress
- Stanley Williams, founder of the Crips
- Murry Wilson, songwriter, talent manager, record producer
- Dorell Wright, NBA player
