= Lennox Elementary School District =

School district in California, United States

Address
- 10319 South Firmona Avenue Lennox, California, 90304; United States

District information
- Type: Public
- Grades: K–12
- NCES District ID: 0621420

Students and staff
- Students: 4,731 (2020–2021)
- Teachers: 216.76 (FTE)
- Staff: 279.65 (FTE)
- Student–teacher ratio: 21.83:1

Other information
- Website: www.lennox.k12.ca.us

Lennox Elementary School District is a public school district based in Lennox, an unincorporated area in Los Angeles County, California, United States.

The district serves a few sections of Hawthorne.

The district was established in 1910.

== History ==
In 1985 97% of the students in the district were of ethnic groups other than non-Hispanic white. That year, Los Angeles County education superintendent Stuart E. Gothold stated that the district had been "finding innovative ways to adjust to rapidly changing pupil populations". In 1985 Bob Williams of the Los Angeles Times cited employees of the governments of Los Angeles County and the State of California and referred to the district as "one of the gems in California’s school system" based on the testimonies of those employees.

== Schools ==
Lower secondary:

- Lennox Middle School
  - It opened in 1985 in the former Lennox High School, which was acquired from the Centinela Valley high school district and now with material to reduce the sound volume from jets at Los Angeles International Airport. Unlike the Centinela Valley district, all of the Lennox elementary district schools were, by that time, majority racial minorities. Additionally, the public did not emphasize desegregation as much by the time 1985 occurred. These two factors meant that no legal efforts to stop the use of the school as a middle school has occurred.

Primary:

- Buford Elementary School
- Felton Elementary School (closed after the 2025-2026 school year)
- Dolores Huerta Elementary School
- Jefferson Elementary School
- Moffett Elementary School

Other:

- School Readiness Center
- Lennox State Preschool
- Lennox Virtual Academy
