= Locke High School =

American public charter high school

Alain LeRoy Locke College Preparatory Academy

Location
- 325 East 111th Street; Los Angeles, California 90061; United States; 33°56′9″N 118°16′1″W

Information
- Type: Public charter high school
- Motto: Once a saint, Always a saint
- Established: 1967
- School district: Los Angeles Unified School District/Green Dot Public Schools
- Staff: 76.01 (FTE)
- Grades: 9-12
- Student to teacher ratio: 18.33
- Colors: Columbia blue Gold
- Athletics conference: Coliseum League; CIF Los Angeles City Section
- Team name: Saints
- Website: Official website

Alain Leroy Locke College Preparatory Academy (formerly Locke High School) is a Title 1 co-educational charter high school located in Los Angeles, California, United States, and is part of the Los Angeles Unified School District/Green Dot Public Schools. It is named after Alain LeRoy Locke.

Locke is located in South Los Angeles near Watts. The school colors are Columbia blue and gold; their mascot is the saint.

== History ==
Alain Leroy Locke Senior High School was opened in 1967 in response to the Watts riots. It was created to provide families in South Los Angeles a safe and secure school. Forty years later, on September 11, 2007, the Los Angeles Unified School District (LAUSD) made history when they voted to give operational control of Locke High School to Green Dot Public Schools. LAUSD made this decision in response to a conversion charter petition submitted by the teachers of Locke High School in support of the transition.

On September 8, 2008, Locke High School reopened as seven small college-prep schools, now known as the Locke Family of High Schools: Locke 1, Locke 2, Locke 3, Locke 4, Locke Tech, Animo Watts, and Ace Academy. The first class graduated in 2011. In 2013, Locke consolidated the family of schools, which were independently chartered, into one college-prep school under a single charter that contains a 9th grade academy and two upper-class academies, referred to as Gold Academy and Blue Academy.

=== Crimes ===
On April 5, 1973, two people were shot in a targeted gang attack.

On January 22, 1974, an 18-year-old male student who was an innocent bystander was killed on the school jogging track in a gang-related shooting.

On September 19, 1994, a 16-year-old female student was shot in the back during lunch and two male students were shot in a drive-by shooting just outside of the schools campus later in the day. The shooting was believed to be gang related.

On March 17, 2005, another gang related shooting happened in which a 15-year-old female student was shot outside of campus who died of her injuries.

On May 10, 2008, a fight "between rival groups of black and Latino students at Locke High School quickly escalated into a campus-wide melee" involving up to 600 people. The disturbance, which occurred under the backdrop of tensions between black and Hispanic students, was quelled after dozens of officers from the Los Angeles Unified School District Police and Los Angeles Police Department responded. Three students and one non-student were arrested; four students were treated for minor injuries. There were no serious injuries.

A third shooting happened on April 13, 2009, in front of the school which resulted in a 16-year-old male student being wounded.

== Student demographics ==
In 2010, Locke #3 had a total of 566 students: 40% African-American (231 students) and 60% Latino (334 students).

At Animo Locke 3, there are 141 students in the 9th grade: 87 Latinos/Hispanic, 54 African American. There are 90 Latinos/Hispanics in the 10th grade and 64 African Americans. In total, there are 154 students in the 10th grade. There are 81 Latino/Hispanic and 81 African Americans in the 11th grade. The total is 162 students in 11th grade. There are 76 12th grade Latino/Hispanics and 54 African Americans in the 12th grade, making a total of 130 12th graders in Animo Locke 3. There is a total of 232 African Americans and 334 Latino/Hispanics. The overall of students in the school ends up being 566 students learning in Animo Locke 3.

== Athletics ==
The Saints compete in CIF's LA City Section in the Coliseum League. The following sports are offered to the students of Locke:

- Boys Basketball
- Girls Basketball
- Baseball
- Softball
- Football
- Track and Field
- Boys Soccer
- Girls Soccer
- Cross Country
- Boys Volleyball
- Girls Volleyball
- Cheerleading
- Boys Tennis
- Girls Tennis

== Notable alumni ==
- Gerald Albright, musician
- Fred Berry, actor and dancer
- Valerie Brisco-Hooks, track and field athlete, 5-time Olympic gold medalist
- Leon "Ndugu" Chancler, music professor, drummer
- Cynthia Cooper-Dyke, WNBA player
- Tyrese Gibson, singer and actor
- Darian Hagan, NFL player
- Darryl Haley, former NFL player
- Darrell Jackson, MLB player
- David Mack, police officer
- Richard Marshall, former NFL player
- Terrace Martin, musician, songwriter, Grammy Award-winning producer
- Eddie Murray, Major League Baseball player and member of the Baseball Hall of Fame
- Sirr Parker, former NFL player
- Jay Rock, musician
- 03 Greedo, rapper
- Patrice Rushen, singer, songwriter and producer
- Ozzie Smith, Major League Baseball player and member of the Baseball Hall of Fame
- Thundercat, musician
- J-Swift, musician
