= Rock the Vote =

US non-profit organization

- Founded: 1990 in Los Angeles
- Purpose: Voter registration, youth voting
- Location: Washington, D.C., United States
- Region served: United States
- Method: Online mobilization, field organizing, entertainment community
- Website: rockthevote.com

Rock the Vote is a non-profit organization in the United States. Through registering new young voters, the group aims to "channel the energy among young people around racial, economic, and health justice into one of the most powerful actions they can take: voting."

The organization was founded in 1990 by Virgin Records America Co-Chairman Jeff Ayeroff to encourage young Americans to vote. It is geared toward increasing voter turnout among voters ages 18 to 24. Rock the Vote is known for its celebrity spokespeople and its partnership with MTV.

== History ==
Rock the Vote was founded in 1990 by Jeff Ayeroff with Virgin America co-chair Jordan Harris and Virgin executive Beverly Lund. Later, they hired Jodi Uttal and then Steve Barr, a campaign worker and political fundraiser, who became co-founders for their contribution to Rock the Vote.

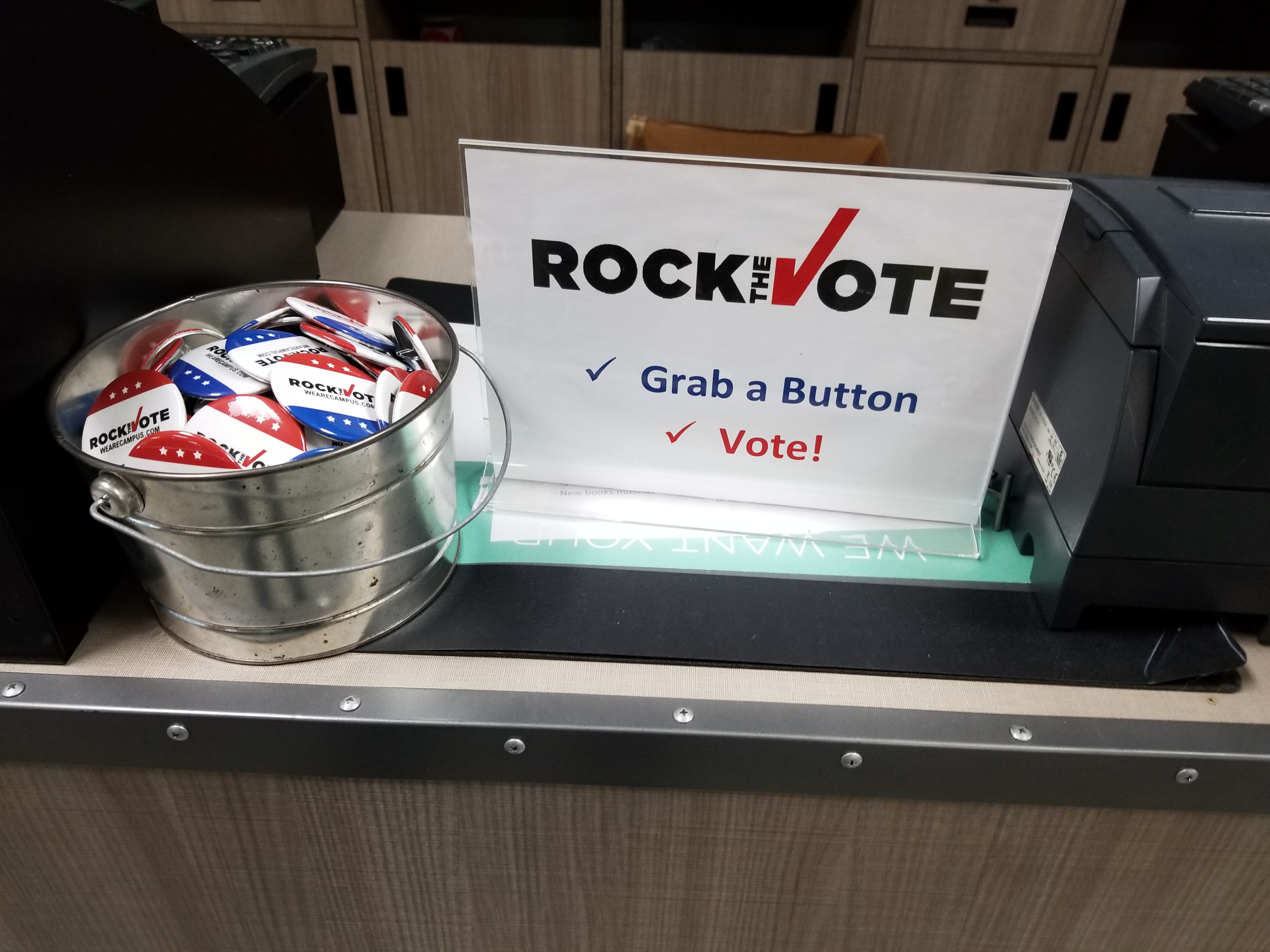
Rock the Vote

Initially, Rock the Vote delivered its voter registration message by staffing tents at music festivals and concerts.

Prior to the 1990 mid-term election, their message was broadcast on MTV with Madonna's Rock the Vote Public Service Announcements (PSA) where she literally wrapped herself in the American flag. That same year, Barr, on behalf of Rock the Vote, testified before Congress to support pending voter registration legislation.

Rock the Vote supported the National Voter Registration Act of 1993, commonly referred to as the "motor voter" bill, which expanded access to voter registration. It was signed into law by President Bill Clinton. The law requires state governments to offer voter registration opportunities to any eligible person who applies for or renews a driver's license or public assistance.

In 1996, Rock the Vote created the first telephone voter registration system, 1-800-REGISTER, followed by the first online voter-registration system, NetVote, later that year.

"We supported Rock the Vote", said Radiohead's Thom Yorke, "but – because of the way the whole political system works – it does seem rather odd to be choosing between one unworkable, outdated system and another. We need to go beyond that – because, at the moment, it's just Cowboys and Indians."

With CNN, Rock the Vote organized "America Rocks the Vote", a 2003 Democratic presidential candidates forum at Faneuil Hall in Boston.

Rock the Vote has expressed support for a public health insurance option. It signed on to Health Care for America NOW!, a progressive political coalition that supported passage of the Affordable Care Act. In 2009, Rock the Vote ran a campaign encouraging people to refuse to have sex with those who opposed what they regarded as a reform of American health care.

During the 2004 presidential election, Rock the Vote drew criticism from Republican Party officials such as Republican National Committee chairman Ed Gillespie for sending a mock draft notice to over 600,000 e-mail addresses. The message included the words "Selective Service System" and read "You are hereby ordered for induction into the Armed Forces of the United States, and to report to a polling place near you" on November 2 (Election Day). The Rock the Vote logo and a facsimile of Secretary Donald Rumsfeld's signature appeared at the bottom of the message. In addition, Rock the Vote created public service announcements featuring the subject of the draft. Besides making the PSAs available to large cable systems, they paid to run them on a random sample of small cable systems where they could measure the effects. Turnout was three percentage points higher among 18- to 19-year-olds in these sample areas than in the control group covered by other similar small cable systems; there was less effect above age 22.

According to the Los Angeles Times, Rock the Vote experienced financial problems in the aftermath of the 2004 election. It emerged from the election $700,000 in debt, and its president resigned in summer 2005 "amid disagreements about the organization's direction". In 2008, Rock the Vote's youth vote registration drive resulted in 2.6 million young voters registered.

In November 2012 and 2013 Rock the Vote experimented with Facebook ads to encourage voter turnout by telling people the number of days remaining until the election and which of their friends "liked" the countdown. The ads were shown to over 400,000 adults, randomly selected from a base over 800,000. Rock the Vote had helped many of them register. The ads did not increase turnout in the experimental group, compared to the control group who did not get the ads. In 2012 they also experimented with text message reminders to 180,000 people who had provided their mobile numbers. Texts the day before the election raised turnout six tenths of a percentage point, while texts on election day lowered turnout.

In advance of the 2014 elections, Rock the Vote released a video titled "Turn Out For What". It was a parody of Lil Jon and DJ Snake's song "Turn Down for What". The video sought to encourage youth voter turnout and featured reproductive rights, marijuana legalization, global warming, LGBT rights, student debt, gun control, and deforestation as reasons why young Americans might want to vote. The video was criticized for having a disproportionate representation of left-wing political issues. The video was also criticized because several of the celebrities who appeared in it, including Lena Dunham, Whoopi Goldberg, Natasha Lyonne, and Darren Criss, had not voted in the previous midterm election.

The day after the 2016 US presidential election, Rock the Vote President and Executive Director Carolyn DeWitt issued a statement on behalf of the organization expressing disappointment with the election of Donald Trump and Republican Party congressional victories, writing "This is a jarring day for Millennial voters, who voted overwhelmingly for Secretary Clinton and for progressive candidates down the ticket...we woke up this morning with full hearts and piercing focus, not just on the next national election in two short years, but on putting the needs of young Americans, people of color and others feeling under siege, front and center for our new president and the 115th Congress". In 2019, DeWitt spoke out in favor of abolishing the United States Electoral College.

== Democracy Class ==
Rock the Vote: Democracy Class is a program put on by Rock the Vote. It is designed to educate high school students about voting, elections, and governance. The lesson plan uses music, pop culture, video, classroom discussion, and a mock election to teach young Americans about elections. On Democracy Day 2011, teachers in all 50 states committed to teaching Democracy Class in more than 1,100 classrooms. High school students in Democracy Classes participate in mobile polls that assess their viewpoints on public policy issues.

== Brands for Democracy ==
Corporate contributors and partners provide financial support, employee volunteers, releasing limited edition voting merchandise, in-app registration, rideshares, space for in person voter registration or other in-kind contributions. This includes Chicago Sky (WNBA team), Comedy Central, Cox Enterprises (including subsidiaries Autotrader, Kelley Blue Book and Cox Homelife), Cricket Wireless, Doordash, Foot Locker (includes Foot Locker, Champs Sports, Footaction, and Eastbay), Fossil, Gap Inc. (Old Navy, Gap, Banana Republic, Athleta, Intermix, Janie and Jack, and Hill City brands), Hulu, Kate Spade, Lyft, Macy's, Snapchat, Spencer's, The Los Angeles Lakers, Tommy Hilfiger, Uber, VH1, WarnerMedia (including HBO), Yelp, Yum! (operates the brands KFC, Pizza Hut, Taco Bell, and The Habit), and Zumiez.

== Athletes Rock the Vote ==
Athletes Rock the Vote is a program developed by Rock the Vote to partner with sports organizations and individual players to raise awareness and promote voter registration education. This has been accomplished through Public Service Announcements, apparel with graphics messaging, and club and stadium messaging, as well as social media posting.

Partners include the Golden State Warriors, NFL, WNBPA, Pittsburgh Steelers, Los Angeles Rams, Atlanta Falcons, Minnesota Vikings, Baltimore Ravens, New England Patriots, San Francisco 49ers, Chicago Sky, Los Angeles Lakers, WNBA, and Pac-12 Conference.

Hoopers Vote and Kickoff The Vote initiatives were designed to rally professional basketball and football communities to take action for the 2020 US elections.

== Celebrity spokespeople ==
This is a partial list of celebrities who have appeared in public service announcements for Rock the Vote.

- Aerosmith
- Against Me!
- Christina Aguilera
- Rachel Bilson
- Adam Brody
- James Charles
- Bootsy Collins
- Buckethead
- Chris Cornell
- Miranda Cosgrove
- Darren Criss
- Miley Cyrus
- Deee-Lite
- Leonardo DiCaprio
- Robert Downey Jr.
- Daniel Dumile
- Macy Gray
- Draymond Green
- Jake Gyllenhaal
- Maggie Gyllenhaal
- Reverend Horton Heat
- The cast of Jack & Bobby
- Janet Jackson
- Michael Jackson
- Samuel L. Jackson
- Allison Janney
- Kendall Jenner
- Kinky
- Lush
- Madonna
- Ricky Martin
- Megadeth
- Brittany Murphy
- The cast of One Tree Hill
- Donny Osmond
- P. Diddy
- Sarah Jessica Parker
- The Ramones
- Red Hot Chili Peppers
- Rhymefest
- Romeo
- Rooster Teeth
- Peter Sarsgaard
- Slaughter
- Michael Stipe
- Justin Timberlake
- Benicio del Toro
- Paul Van Dyk
- Eddie Vedder
- Scott Weiland
- will.i.am
- XO Stereo
