= Steve Barr (educator) =

American educator and activist

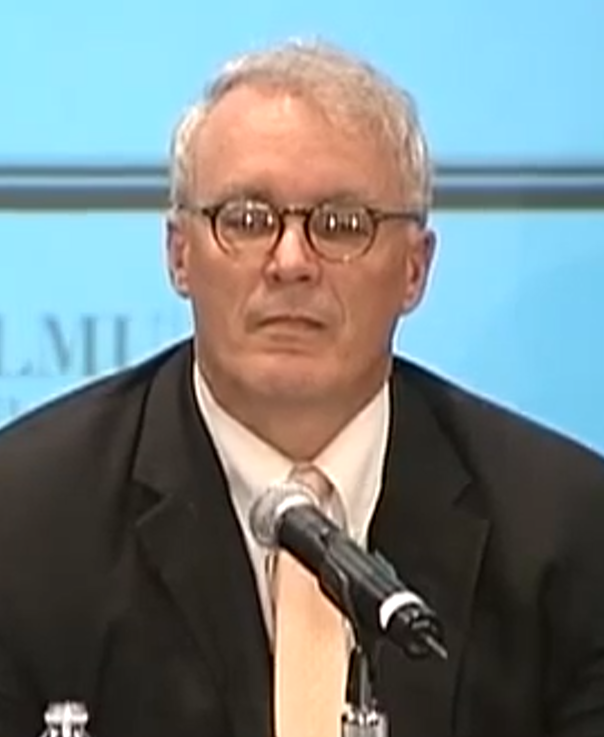
- Barr in 2010

Personal details
- Born: July 25, 1959 (age 66)
- Citizenship: American
- Spouse: Teresa Wierzbianska
- Education: University of California, Santa Barbara
- Occupation: Educator; Activist; Author
- Known for: Green Dot Public Schools (founder); Rock the Vote (co-founder); Future is Now (founder)

Steve Barr (born July 25, 1959) is an American educator, political activist, and author, best known as a co-founder of Rock the Vote and founder of Green Dot Public Schools, a charter school organization in Los Angeles, California. He led Green Dot from 2000 to 2009. Barr also founded Future is Now Schools, a non-profit school organization that works on reforming schools from within.

Barr worked on the presidential campaigns of two Democratic Party candidates in the 1980s and served as Finance Chairman of the California Democratic Party. After having worked on school reform for many years, in June 2016 Steve Barr announced his candidacy for the 2017 Los Angeles mayoral election, challenging incumbent mayor Eric Garcetti, before withdrawing from the race.

== Early life and education ==
Steve Barr was born in San Mateo, California in 1959. His father left the family when Barr was two years old. Barr and his younger brother were raised by a single mother.

Barr spent his early childhood in Monterey, California, where his mother worked as a dental assistant and cocktail waitress. When he was six, Barr and his younger brother were placed in foster care for a year. In 1973, the family moved to Cupertino, California where he and his brother attended Cupertino High School. At Cupertino High, Barr played on the basketball team and was elected student body president.

Barr attended community college and later transferred to University of California, Santa Barbara, where he graduated with a bachelor of arts degree in political science in 1982. During his college years, Barr joined the Teamsters and worked as a truck loader at United Parcel Service. During this time he became more politically active, founding the UCSB chapter of College Democrats and interning for then-governor Jerry Brown.

== Professional life ==
=== Political activism ===
After receiving his degree, Barr was hired to organize events for the 1984 Summer Olympics Torch Relay. He recounts this period of his life in his memoir The Flame: An Unlikely Patriot Finds a Country to Love. That year, he joined the national staff of then-Senator Gary Hart's presidential campaign. In the next presidential cycle in 1988, he worked for Governor Michael Dukakis' campaign. During this time, Barr also served as the finance chairman for the California Democratic Party.

In 1990, Barr co-founded Rock the Vote, a national campaign to boost youth voter turnout and engage young people in the democratic process.

=== Green Dot Public Schools ===
Barr was influenced by meeting Reed Hastings, education activist and founder of Netflix, and Don Shalvey, the founder of California's first charter school, the San Carlos Learning Center, in Northern California. At an event in 1997, President Bill Clinton announced a federally funded public charter school grant program.

As a result, Barr founded his flagship organization, Green Dot Public Schools, and opened his first charter high school, Animo Leadership High School in Lennox, California in 2000. He later opened subsequent schools, including Animo Inglewood in 2002 and Animo Oscar de la Hoya in Boyle Heights in 2004. By the end of Barr's involvement at Green Dot, his organization was operating 20 public schools under his auspice. He left Green Dot in 2009.

=== Campaign for Mayor of Los Angeles ===
On June 27, 2016, Barr announced his candidacy for the 2017 Los Angeles mayoral election, challenging incumbent mayor Eric Garcetti. On his campaign's website, Barr wrote:

I'm running for mayor of Los Angeles to disrupt the political establishment and turn our city around. Together, we're building a grassroots movement to transform L.A.'s schools, end the homelessness and affordability crisis, and fight for a city where every family can thrive.

— Steve Barr, Campaign website, June 27, 2016

Barr dropped out of the mayoral race.
