= Los Angeles Southwest College =

Public community college in LA County, California

- Type: Public community college
- Established: September 1967
- President: Anthony Culpepper
- Academic staff: 300
- Administrative staff: 125
- Students: 8,200 (full-time)
- Location: West Athens (Los Angeles postal address), California, United States; 33.929358°N 118.305395°W
- Campus: Urban
- Colors: Blue and Gold
- Mascot: Cougars
- Website: www.lasc.edu

Los Angeles Southwest College (LASC) is a public community college in the unincorporated area of West Athens, California in Los Angeles County, California. It is part of the Los Angeles Community College District and its service area includes Inglewood, Hawthorne, Gardena, Unincorporated Westmont, and West Athens.

== History ==
Los Angeles Southwest College was established in 1967, two years after the Watts riots, in response to complaints of both officials and citizens that not enough was being done to educate the area's mostly African American population. The college, located at the intersection of Western Avenue and Imperial Highway, is the only community college in South Central Los Angeles.

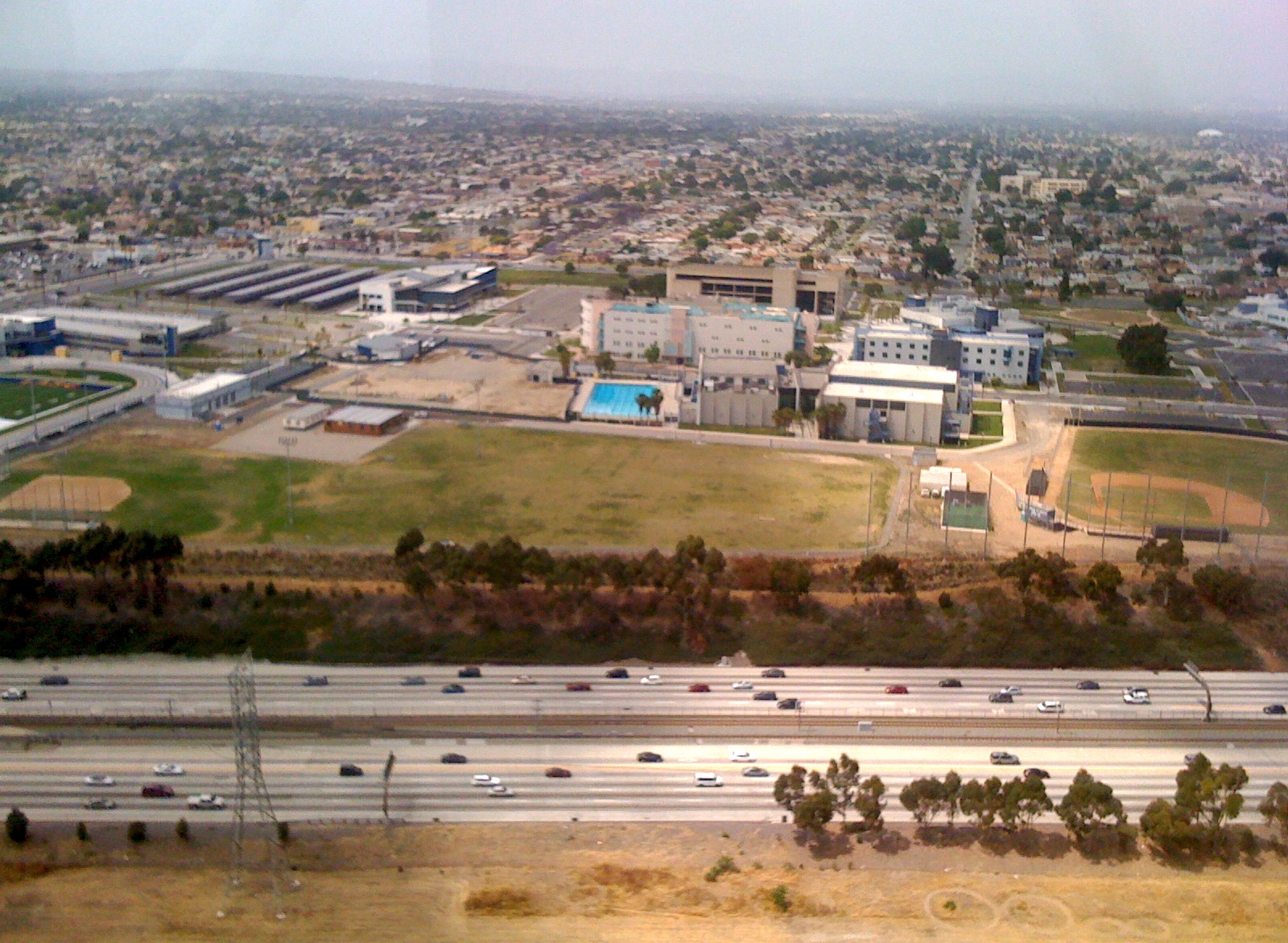
Aerial view of LA Southwest College from the south, with the I-105 freeway in foreground and practice baseball fields.

LASC has secured over $500 million of bonds to complete its master facilities master plan by 2025. As a "green campus", LASC has a college-wide recycling program and will have the majority of its building meeting some level of LEED standard.

== Notable alumni ==
Student body composition as of 2022
Race and ethnicity	Total
Hispanic	50%
Black	35%
White	5%
Unknown	4%
Asian	3%
Two or more races (Note: Other consists of Multiracial Americans & those who prefer to not say.)	3%
Foreign national	0%
Gender Distribution
Male	29%
Female	71%
Age Distribution
Under 18	15%
18–24	38%
25–64	46%

- Larry Brown, Dallas Cowboys and Oakland Raiders cornerback, Super Bowl XXX MVP
- Othyus Jeffers, former NBA player
- Ivan Johnson, former NBA power forward
- Sam Johnson, former NFL player
- Isaac Larian, founder and CEO of MGA Entertainment
- Curtis Millage, former professional basketball player
- Chris Mims, former NFL player

== See also ==
- Odessa Cox
- West Athens, California
