= Westmont, California =

- Unincorporated community Census designated place
- Interactive map of Westmont, California
- Location in Greater Los Angeles Location in California
- Coordinates: 33°56′29″N 118°18′8″W
- Country: United States
- State: California
- County: Los Angeles

Area
  - Total: 1.847 sq mi (4.784 km^{2})
  - Land: 1.847 sq mi (4.784 km^{2})
  - Water: 0 sq mi (0 km^{2}) 0%
- Elevation: 217 ft (66 m)

Population (April 1, 2020)
  - Total: 33,913
  - Density: 18,360/sq mi (7,089/km^{2})
- Time zone: UTC-8 (Pacific)
  - Summer (DST): UTC-7 (PDT)
- ZIP code: 90047
- Area codes: 213/323
- FIPS code: 06-84592
- GNIS feature ID: 1867072

Westmont is an unincorporated community in Los Angeles County, California, United States, a part of the South Los Angeles area, just east of Inglewood. The population was 33,913 at the 2020 census, up from 31,853 at the 2010 census. For statistical purposes, the United States Census Bureau has defined Westmont as a census-designated place (CDP).

== Geography ==
Westmont has a total area of 1.8 square miles (4.7 km^{2}), all land. It adjoins the Vermont Vista neighborhood of the city of Los Angeles.

== History ==
In 2009, Westmont was the subject of a feature story by Hector Tobar in the Los Angeles Times who wrote that the community was "officially (but rarely) called Westmont" but that it had "no "'mont,' not even a hill. It got its name, it seems, from being west of Vermont Avenue." Tobar noted that Westmont's unemployment rate was at the time "a staggering 23.6%, the highest in Los Angeles County."

Five years later, the strip of Vermont Avenue which is shared between Westmont and Vermont Vista was called "death alley" by the newspaper because during the past seven years sixty people had been killed by violence on that two-mile stretch. It remained at the highest rate of killings of any neighborhood in Los Angeles County.

The 2014 article stated that "The area was long been controlled by a gang named the Underground Crips, whose members would, in more violent days, walk across Normandie Avenue to shoot at rivals."

== Demographics ==
According to the Los Angeles Times, fewer than six percent of residents held bachelor's degrees in 2000. The neighborhood is fraught with gang and police-related violence, as well as structural racism and entrenched poverty.

For statistical purposes, the United States Census Bureau has designated the unincorporated area as a census designated place (CDP).

Historical population
Census	Pop.	Note	%±
1970	29,310		—
1980	27,916		−4.8%
1990	31,044		11.2%
2000	31,623		1.9%
2010	31,853		0.7%
2020	33,913		6.5%
U.S. Decennial Census; 1860–1870 1880-1890; 1900 1910 1920; 1930 1940 1950; 1960 1970 1980; 1990 2000 2010; 2020

Westmont first appeared as an unincorporated community in the 1970 U.S. census; and as a census designated place in the 1980 United States census.

=== Racial and ethnic composition ===
Westmont CDP, California – Racial and ethnic composition Note: the US Census treats Hispanic/Latino as an ethnic category. This table excludes Latinos from the racial categories and assigns them to a separate category. Hispanics/Latinos may be of any race.
Race / Ethnicity (NH = Non-Hispanic)	Pop 2000	Pop 2010	Pop 2020	% 2000	% 2010	% 2020
White alone (NH)	381	324	427	1.20%	1.02%	1.26%
Black or African American alone (NH)	18,095	15,955	13,717	57.22%	50.09%	40.45%
Native American or Alaska Native alone (NH)	81	38	59	0.26%	0.12%	0.17%
Asian alone (NH)	115	99	194	0.36%	0.31%	0.57%
Native Hawaiian or Pacific Islander alone (NH)	27	30	59	0.09%	0.09%	0.17%
Other race alone (NH)	99	148	231	0.31%	0.46%	0.68%
Mixed race or Multiracial (NH)	326	388	831	1.03%	1.22%	2.45%
Hispanic or Latino (any race)	12,499	14,871	18,395	39.53%	46.69%	54.24%
Total	31,623	31,853	33,913	100.00%	100.00%	100.00%

=== 2020 census ===
As of the 2020 census, Westmont had a population of 33,913. The median age was 33.3 years. 27.4% of residents were under the age of 18 and 10.7% of residents were 65 years of age or older. For every 100 females there were 88.7 males, and for every 100 females age 18 and over there were 83.1 males age 18 and over.

100.0% of residents lived in urban areas, while 0.0% lived in rural areas.

There were 10,521 households in Westmont, of which 42.6% had children under the age of 18 living in them. Of all households, 29.5% were married-couple households, 20.0% were households with a male householder and no spouse or partner present, and 42.7% were households with a female householder and no spouse or partner present. About 23.5% of all households were made up of individuals and 8.4% had someone living alone who was 65 years of age or older.

There were 10,990 housing units, of which 4.3% were vacant. The homeowner vacancy rate was 0.5% and the rental vacancy rate was 3.1%.

Racial composition as of the 2020 census
Race	Number	Percent
White	2,051	6.0%
Black or African American	14,025	41.4%
American Indian and Alaska Native	544	1.6%
Asian	202	0.6%
Native Hawaiian and Other Pacific Islander	62	0.2%
Some other race	13,447	39.7%
Two or more races	3,582	10.6%

Westmont lost its Black majority status in the 2020 census, leaving only two communities in the state delineated by the U.S. Census Bureau with Black majority populations.

=== 2010 census ===
In the 2010 census, Westmont had a population of 31,853. The population density was 17,239.9 inhabitants per square mile (6,656.4/km^{2}). The racial makeup of Westmont was 16,262 (51.1%) African American, 5,037 (15.8%) white (including 1.0% non-Hispanic white), 188 (0.6%) Native American, 126 (0.4%) Asian, 31 (0.1%) Pacific Islander, 9,180 (28.8%) from other races, and 1,029 (3.2%) from two or more races. Hispanic or Latino of any race were 14,871 persons (46.7%).

The census reported that 31,693 people (99.5% of the population) lived in households, 119 (0.4%) lived in non-institutionalized group quarters, and 41 (0.1%) were institutionalized.

There were 9,695 households, 4,750 (49.0%) had children under the age of 18 living in them, 2,995 (30.9%) were opposite-sex married couples living together, 3,194 (32.9%) had a female householder with no husband present, 904 (9.3%) had a male householder with no wife present. There were 776 (8.0%) unmarried opposite-sex partnerships, and 52 (0.5%) same-sex married couples or partnerships. 2,141 households (22.1%) were one person and 669 (6.9%) had someone living alone who was 65 or older. The average household size was 3.27. There were 7,093 families (73.2% of households); the average family size was 3.78.

The age distribution was 9,860 people (31.0%) under the age of 18, 3,759 people (11.8%) aged 18 to 24, 8,577 people (26.9%) aged 25 to 44, 6,979 people (21.9%) aged 45 to 64, and 2,678 people (8.4%) who were 65 or older. The median age was 29.9 years. For every 100 females, there were 86.8 males. For every 100 females aged 18 and over, there were 80.3 males.

There were 10,588 housing units at an average density of 5,730.6 per square mile, of the occupied units 3,012 (31.1%) were owner-occupied and 6,683 (68.9%) were rented. The homeowner vacancy rate was 2.5%; the rental vacancy rate was 8.8%. 10,864 people (34.1% of the population) lived in owner-occupied housing units and 20,829 people (65.4%) lived in rental housing units.

=== 2000 census ===
In the 2000 census, there were 31,623 people, 9,255 households, and 7,089 families living in the CDP. The population density was 17,103.0 inhabitants per square mile (6,603.5/km^{2}). There were 10,186 housing units at an average density of 5,509.0 per square mile (2,127.0/km^{2}). The racial makeup of the CDP was 11.8% White, 58.0% African American, 0.6% Native American, 0.4% Asian, 0.2% Pacific Islander, 25.8% from other races, and 3.3% from two or more races. Hispanic or Latino of any race were 39.5%.

Of the 9,255 households 47.3% had children under the age of 18 living with them, 33.9% were married couples living together, 34.9% had a female householder with no husband present, and 23.4% were non-families. 19.2% of households were one person and 5.0% were one person aged 65 or older. The average household size was 3.41 and the average family size was 3.85.

The age distribution was 37.8% under the age of 18, 10.5% from 18 to 24, 29.3% from 25 to 44, 16.3% from 45 to 64, and 6.0% 65 or older. The median age was 26 years. For every 100 females, there were 86.6 males. For every 100 females aged 18 and over, there were 78.5 males.

The median household income was $23,323 and the median family income was $23,712. Males had a median income of $24,682 versus $25,775 for females. The per capita income for the CDP was $9,765. About 35.3% of families and 36.9% of the population were below the poverty line, including 46.7% of those under age 18 and 22.1% of those age 65 or over.

Mexican and Unspecified African were the most common ancestries according to Mapping L.A. Mexico and El Salvador were the most common foreign places of birth.

== Government ==
In the California State Legislature, Westmont is in the 35th senatorial district, represented by Democrat Laura Richardson, and in the 61st Assembly district, represented by Democrat Tina McKinnor.

In the United States House of Representatives, Westmont is in California's 43rd congressional district, represented by Democrat Maxine Waters.

Law enforcement is provided by the Los Angeles County Sheriff's Department.

== Education ==
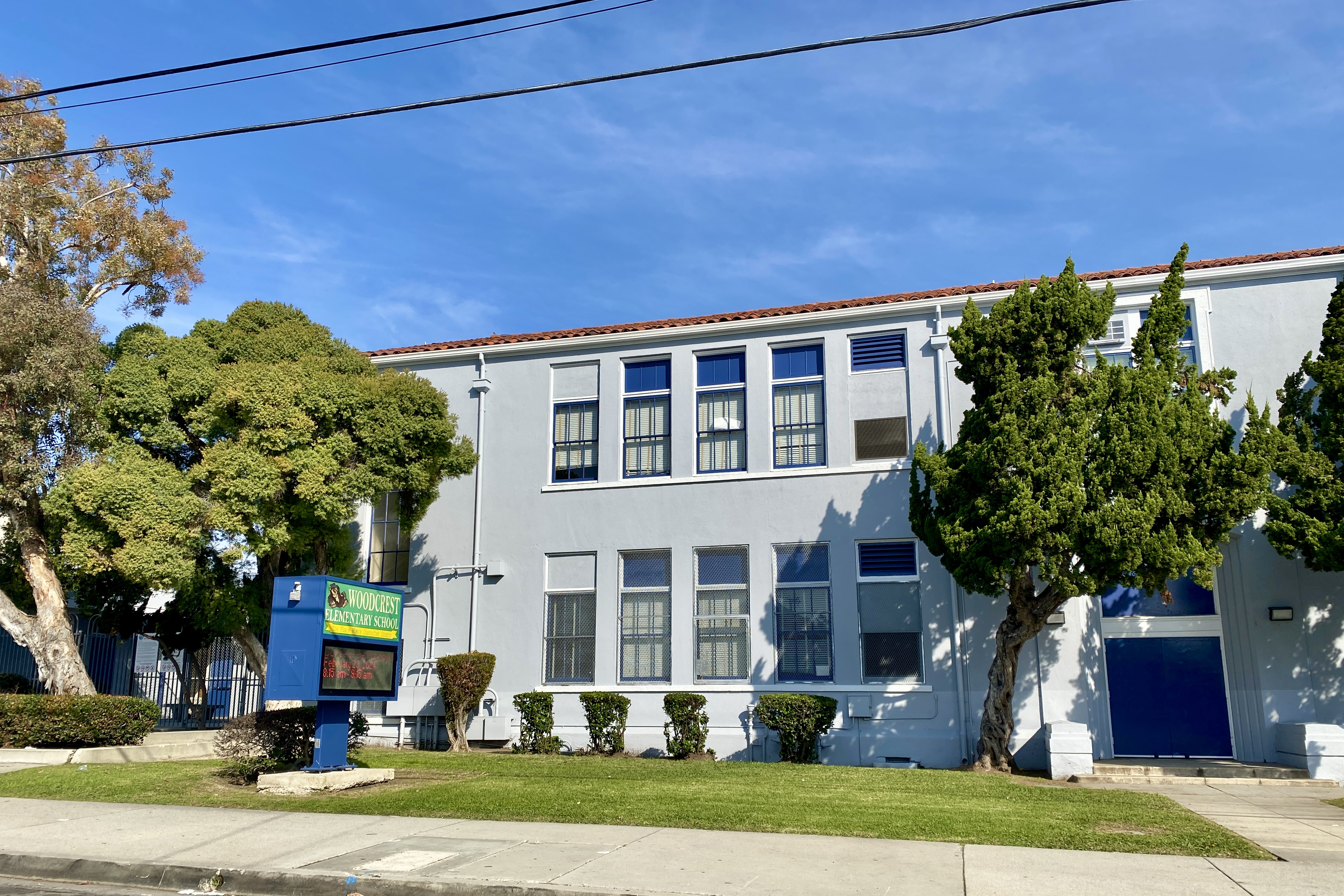
Woodcrest School, 1151 109th Street

The area is within the Los Angeles Unified School District.

Areas considered to be in Westmont are generally zoned to:

- Century Park Elementary School
- Woodcrest Elementary School
- Washington Preparatory High School
- Middle College High School
- Animo South Los Angeles Charter High School

LAUSD schools in Westmont include:

- Boys Academic Leadership Academy
- George Washington Preparatory High School
- Duke Ellington Continuation High School
- Woodcrest Elementary School
- 95th Street Elementary School

Charter schools in Westmont include:

- Animo South Los Angeles Charter High School of Green Dot Public Schools

=== Library Service ===
- Woodcrest Community Library, County of Los Angeles Public Library

== Notable people ==
- Ice Cube (O'Shea Jackson), rapper, actor, writer, producer, and director grew up on Van Wick Street in Westmont.

== See also ==
- Killing of Dijon Kizzee
