= Ánimo Leadership Charter High School =

Coordinates: 33.934723°N 118.347724°W

Location
- 11044 S Freeman Ave; Inglewood, California 90305

Information
- School type: Charter Public high school
- Established: 2000
- Status: Open
- Oversight: Green Dot Public Schools
- Principal: Danielle Berger
- Grades: 9–12
- Enrollment: 525
- Average class size: 28
- Hours in school day: 7.5 hours
- Campus size: Small
- Campus type: Suburb, Large Territory
- Colours: Navy Blue, White, and Khaki
- Slogan: Ensuring that all young adults receive the education they need to be prepared for college, leadership, and life
- Athletics: Soccer, Baseball, Basketball, Softball, Cross-country, Football
- Athletics conference: Mulholland League, CIF Southern Section
- Mascot: Aztec
- Website: http://www.greendot.org/leadership/

Ánimo Leadership Charter High School (also known as "Ánimo, ALCHS, or Ánimo Leadership") is a public charter school in Inglewood, California, operated by Green Dot Public Schools of Los Angeles. Ánimo was the first Green Dot school to be established, in 2000.

== Academics ==
The school has been ranked by the U.S. News & World Report as one of the top 100 high schools in the nation. For the third year in a row, it is among the top 100 Gold Medal Schools, ranking in the 23rd place (2010).

The U.S. News & World Report also ranked Ánimo Leadership as the fifth best charter high school in the nation and the 5th best high school in state of California.

== History ==
After spending more than 10 years in a temporary facility (leased from the University of West Los Angeles Law), Ánimo Leadership has moved to Lennox, CA, near South Freeman Avenue.

On October 28, 2002, President Bill Clinton and former California Governor Gray Davis visited Ánimo Leadership Charter High School while rallying. President Clinton stated "We should have more schools like Ánimo".

== Athletics ==
Ánimo is part of the Mulholland League of the CIF Southern Section.

The Ánimo Leadership Charter High School boy's varsity soccer program won its first CIF Division 6 Championship in 2007 led by Coach Sergio Medrano. A notable player from that year's championship team is Rafael Baca, who now has played on the collegiate level and the professional level.

In the 2012-2013 soccer season, Ánimo won its second CIF Division 6 Championship and its first ever Division 3 CIF Regional Championship.

The success of the Ánimo Leadership soccer program continued in the 2013-2014 season when it obtained its third CIF Division 6 Championship, making it the first time in the program's history that Ánimo won back-to-back championships.
