= Green Dot Public Schools =

Charter district in Downtown, Los Angeles, California, United States

- California

Information
- Type: Charter school district
- Founded: 1999
- Founder: Steve Barr
- Website: greendot.org

Green Dot Public Schools (GDPS) is a non-profit educational organization charter school district headquartered in Downtown Los Angeles, California, that operates 18 public schools in Greater Los Angeles, including nine charter high schools, five schools in Tennessee, and one middle school in Texas.

The organization was founded by educator Steve Barr in 1999. The schools that Green Dot operates in California are each named Ánimo, the Spanish word for rigor and strength. The graduation rates of schools operated by Green Dot are higher than those of the Los Angeles Unified School District; in the 2014–2015 school year, 80% of students graduated from Ánimo schools, compared to 72% that year for LAUSD (79.7% for Comprehensive High Schools.)

In 2006, Green Dot opened five charter schools within the attendance area of Los Angeles' troubled Locke High School. In 2008, a majority of permanent teachers at Locke High School voted to reconstitute the underperforming school as a Green Dot Charter School. In 2014, Green Dot served some public schools in Memphis, Tennessee, that were previously operated by Memphis City Schools.

Previously, Green Dot operated three schools in Washington, but closed two of them in 2019 citing financial troubles, and parted ways with the other.

== California School results ==
Green Dot serves middle and high school students in and around Los Angeles, California. The five Green Dot schools that opened prior to 2006 are achieving high results on several key metrics compared to neighboring traditional public schools. Green Dot's first campus, Ánimo Leadership High School in Inglewood, has an API score of 806 compared to the 589 score of neighboring LAUSD Hillcrest High school.

In 2008, a Los Angeles Times op-ed by Ralph Shaffer, professor emeritus in history at Cal Poly Pomona, raised numerous concerns about plans for Green Dot to "operate Locke High School during the regular school year" and predicted failure. UCLA's National Center for Research on Evaluation, Standards, and Student Testing evaluated Green Dot's Locke Transformation Project, finding generally positive results. The CRESST Evaluation claims, "results from matched samples of students suggest that 9th graders who entered GDL generally performed better on a range of student outcome measures than they would have if they had attended a comparable LAUSD high school." Countering concerns that Green Dot would simply purge students who proved more challenging to educate, the CRESST Evaluation concludes, "GDL students were very similar to Locke’s demographic profile prior to the GDL transformation, as well as to comparison students from GDL feeder schools who attended three comparison high schools in the Los Angeles Unified School District (LAUSD)."

== Schools ==
Green Dot Public Schools has 25 charter schools:

=== California ===
- Ánimo City of Champions High School

Animo Compton Middle School/High School

- Ánimo Ellen Ochoa Charter Middle

School

- Ánimo Florence Firestone Middle School
- Animo Inglewood Charter High School
- Ánimo Jackie Robinson Charter High School
- Ánimo James B. Taylor Charter Middle School
- Ánimo Jefferson Charter Middle School
- Animo Leadership Charter High School
- Ánimo Legacy Charter Middle School
- Alain Leroy Locke College Preparatory Academy
- Ánimo Mae Jemison Charter Middle School
- Ánimo Pat Brown Charter High School
- Ánimo Ralph Bunche Charter High School
- Ánimo South Los Angeles Charter High School
- Animo Venice Charter High School
- Ánimo Watts College Preparatory Academy
- Ánimo Westside Charter Middle School
- Oscar De La Hoya Ánimo Charter High School

=== Tennessee ===
- Bluff City High School
- Fairley High School
- Hillcrest High School (Memphis, Tennessee)
- Kirby Middle School
- Wooddale Middle School

=== Texas ===
- MLK Middle School
