= 2026 California lieutenant gubernatorial election =

- November 3, 2026
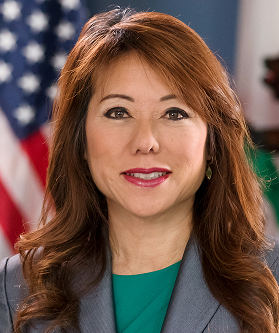

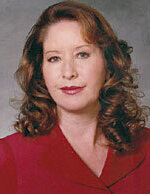
Candidate	Fiona Ma	Gloria Romero
Party	Democratic	Republican
Popular vote	8,580,924	4,508,226
Percentage	65.6%	34.4%
- Ma: 50–60% 60–70% 70–80% 80–90% Romero: 50–60% 60–70% 70–80%
Lieutenant Governor before election
Eleni Kounalakis
Democratic
Elected Lieutenant Governor
Fiona Ma
Democratic

The 2026 California lieutenant gubernatorial election was held on November 3, 2026, to elect the lieutenant governor of California. Incumbent Democrat Eleni Kounalakis was term-limited and could not seek re-election to a third term in office; she instead ran for state treasurer. A primary election was held on June 2 with Democrat Fiona Ma, the state's Treasurer, advancing to the general election alongside Republican Gloria Romero, a former Democratic state senator.

== Candidates ==
=== Democratic Party ===
==== Advanced to general ====
- Fiona Ma, California State Treasurer (2019–present) (previously ran for governor)

==== Eliminated in primary ====
- Josh Fryday, chief service officer for governor Gavin Newsom and former mayor of Novato
- Janelle Kellman, former mayor of Sausalito
- Jeyson Lopez, customer service consultant
- Oliver Ma, civil rights attorney
- Tim Myers, musician and record producer (previously ran for CA-41)
- Abdul Sikder, San Francisco State University professor
- Mushtaq MT Tahirkheli (write-in)
- Michael Tubbs, former mayor of Stockton (2017–2021)

==== Withdrawn ====
- Steven Bradford, former state senator from the 35th district (2016–2024) (endorsed Fiona Ma, running for insurance commissioner)

=== Republican Party ===
==== Advanced to general ====
- Gloria Romero, former Democratic majority leader of the California Senate (2005–2008) from the 24th district (2001–2010)

==== Eliminated in primary ====
- James P. Cameron (write-in)
- David Collenberg, farmer and business owner
- David Fennell, entrepreneur and candidate for lieutenant governor in 2018 and 2022
- Ebie Lynch, nurse
- Skip Shelton, defense technology executive

==== Withdrawn ====
- David Serpa, businessman and runner-up for California's 39th congressional district in 2024 (ran for governor)

=== No party preference ===
==== Eliminated in primary ====
- Rakesh Christian, business owner, candidate for mayor of Antioch in 2024
- Sean Collinson, mediator

=== Peace and Freedom Party ===
==== Eliminated in primary ====
- Alice Stek, obstetrician-gynecologist

== Primary election ==
=== Endorsements ===
Josh Fryday (D)

Executive branch officials

- Pete Buttigieg, former secretary of transportation (2021–2025)

Statewide officials

- Betty Yee, former state controller of California (2015-2023)

U.S. senators

- Barbara Boxer, former California (1993–2017)

U.S. representatives

- Jared Huffman, CA-02 (2013–present)
- Lois Capps, former CA-24 (1998–2017)

State legislators

- Melissa Hurtado, SD-16 (2018–present)
- Jesse Gabriel, AD-46 (2018–present)
- Chris Rogers, AD-02 (2024–present)

Municipal officials

- Ashleigh Aitken, mayor of Anaheim
- Patricia Lock Dawson, mayor of Riverside
- Christina Fugazi, mayor of Stockton
- Valerie Amezcua, mayor of Santa Ana

Labor unions

- California Federation of Teachers (co-endorsement with Fiona Ma)
- California Teachers Association
- United Brotherhood of Carpenters and Joiners of America - California Conference of Carpenters (co-endorsement with Fiona Ma)

Organizations

- California Environmental Voters
- VoteVets
- With Honor Fund
- Center for Biological Diversity Action Fund

Newspapers

- Fresno Bee
- Merced Sun-Star
- Modesto Bee
- Sacramento Bee
- San Francisco Examiner
- San Luis Obispo Tribune
Janelle Kellman (D)

Organizations

- East Area Progressive Democrats
- LPAC
- Stonewall Democrats

Newspapers

- Bay Area Reporter
Fiona Ma (D)

Statewide officials

- Eleni Kounalakis, lieutenant governor of California (2019–present)

State legislators

- Steven Bradford, SD-35 (2016–2024)
- Cathleen Galgiani, SD-05 (2012–2020)
- Scott Wiener, SD-11 (2016–present)
- Cecilia Aguiar-Curry, AD-04 (2016–present)
- Robert Garcia, AD-50 (2024–present)
- Mark Gonzalez, AD-54 (2024–present)
- Corey Jackson, AD-60 (2022–present)
- Evan Low, AD-26 (2014–2024)
- José Solache, AD-62 (2024–present)
- Chris Ward, AD-78 (2020–present)
- Rick Zbur, AD-51 (2022–present)

Municipal officials

- London Breed, former mayor of San Francisco (2018–2025)
- Willie Brown, former mayor of San Francisco (1996–2004)
- Ken Carlson, Contra Costa County supervisor from the 4th district (2022–present)
- Matt Dorsey, San Francisco supervisor from the 6th district (2022–present)
- Barbara Lee, mayor of Oakland (2025–present) (co-endorsement with Tubbs)
- Rafael Mandelman, president of the San Francisco Board of Supervisors (2025–present) from the 8th district (2018–present)
- John Pérez, Regent of the University of California (2014–present) and former Speaker of the California State Assembly (2010–2014) from AD-53 (2008–2014)
- R. Rex Parris, mayor of Lancaster (2008–present) (Republican)
- Jeffrey Prang, Los Angeles County Assessor (2014–present)
- Raj Salwan, mayor of Fremont (2024–present)
- Helen Tran, mayor of San Bernardino (2022–present)

Labor unions

- Association for Los Angeles Deputy Sheriffs
- California Building & Construction Trades Council
- California Federation of Labor Unions
- California Federation of Teachers (co-endorsement with Fryday)
- International Alliance of Theatrical Stage Employees
- International Brotherhood of Teamsters - California and Local 665
- National Union of Healthcare Workers
- Professional Engineers in California Government
- UNITE HERE Local 11
- United Auto Workers Region 6 (co-endorsement with Oliver Ma)
- United Food and Commercial Workers Western Council

Organizations

- National Women's Political Caucus California

Newspapers

- East Bay Times
- The Mercury News
Oliver Ma (D)

Labor unions

- United Auto Workers Region 6 (co-endorsement with Fiona Ma)

Organizations

- California Democratic Socialists of America
- Council on American–Islamic Relations Action
- Our Revolution East Bay
- Progressive Victory
Gloria Romero (R)

Individuals

- Steve Hilton, political commentator and 2026 gubernatorial candidate (candidate's running mate)

Political parties

- California Republican Party
Alice Stek (PFP)

Political parties

- Green Party of California
- Peace and Freedom Party
Michael Tubbs (D)

U.S. senators

- Laphonza Butler, former U.S. senator from California (2023–2024)

U.S. representatives

- Ro Khanna, CA-17 (2017–present)
- Robert Garcia, CA-42 (2023–present)
- Sam Liccardo, CA-16 (2025–present)
- Lateefah Simon, CA-12 (2025–present)

State legislators

- Mia Bonta, AD-18 (2021–present)
- Isaac Bryan, AD-51 (2021–present)
- Sade Elhawary, AD-57 (2024–present)
- Matt Haney, AD-17 (2022–present)
- Lola Smallwood-Cuevas, SD-28 (2022–present)

County officials

- Lindsey Horvath, Los Angeles supervisor from the 3rd district (2022–present)
- Bilal Mahmood, San Francisco supervisor from the 5th district (2024–present)
- Holly Mitchell, Los Angeles supervisor from the 2nd district (2020–present)
- Vicente Sarmiento Orange County supervisor from the 2nd district (2023–present)
- Shamann Walton, San Francisco supervisor from the 10th district (2019–present)

Municipal officials

- Michael Bloomberg, former mayor of New York City (2002–2013)
- Marqueece Harris-Dawson, Los Angeles City Councilmember from the 8th district (2015–present)
- Barbara Lee, mayor of Oakland (2025–present) (co-endorsement with Fiona Ma)

Individuals

- Steve Phillips, author
- Tommy Vietor, political commentator

Political parties

- California Working Families Party

Labor unions

- California Faculty Association
- SEIU California

Organizations

- California Legislative Black Caucus
- California Environmental Voters
- Harvey Milk LGBTQ Democratic Club
- Courage California

Newspapers

- San Francisco Chronicle

=== Polling ===
Poll source	Date(s) administered	Sample size (Note: Key: A – all adults RV – registered voters LV – likely voters V – unclear)	Margin of error	David Fennell (R)	Fiona Ma (D)	Gloria Romero (R)	Michael Tubbs (D)	Josh Fryday (D)	Undecided
David Binder Research (D) (Note: Poll sponsored by Josh Fryday's campaign)	January 20–25, 2026	800 (LV)	± 3.5%	18%	16%	11%	4%	2%	50%

Hypothetical polling

Poll source	Date(s) administered	Sample size	Margin of error	Brian Dahle (R)	Fiona Ma (D)	Gloria Romero (R)	Michael Tubbs (D)	Other	Undecided
Tulchin Research (D) (Note: Poll sponsored by Fiona Ma's campaign)	January 29 – February 4, 2026	800 (LV)	± 3.5%	20%	18%	10%	5%	13% (Note: Janelle Kellman (D), Oliver Ma (D), and Tim Myers (D) with 3%; Josh Fryday (D) and Alice Stek (PFP) with 2%)	34%

=== Results ===
Results by county F. Ma: 10–20%; 20–30%; 30–40%; Romero: 10–20%; 20–30%; Fryday: 20–30%; 30–40%; Tubbs: 10–20%; Collenberg: 20–30%; 30–40%

Primary election results
Party	Candidate	Votes	%
Democratic	Fiona Ma	1,631,935	19.12
Republican	Gloria Romero	1,521,181	17.83
Democratic	Josh Fryday	1,256,824	14.73
Democratic	Michael Tubbs	1,132,160	13.27
Democratic	Oliver Ma	621,147	7.28
Republican	David Collenberg	594,336	6.96
Republican	David Fennell	521,455	6.11
Republican	Skip Shelton	345,324	4.05
Democratic	Janelle Kellman	311,237	3.65
Republican	Ebie Lynch	156,714	1.84
Democratic	Tim Myers	132,564	1.55
Peace and Freedom	Alice Stek	125,100	1.47
Democratic	Jeyson Lopez	94,058	1.10
Democratic	Abdur Rahman Sikder	51,620	0.60
No party preference	Sean Collinson	24,927	0.29
No party preference	Rakesh Christian	12,870	0.15
Republican	James P. Cameron (write-in)	45	0.00
Democratic	Mushtaq MT Tahirkheli (write-in)	7	0.00
Total votes		8,533,504	100.0

==== By county ====
County	Fiona Ma Democratic		Gloria Romero Republican		Josh Fryday Democratic		Michael Tubbs Democratic		Oliver Ma Democratic		David Collenberg Republican		David Fennell Republican		Various others Various parties		Margin		Total
County	#	%	#	%	#	%	#	%	#	%	#	%	#	%	#	%	#	%	Total
Alameda	98,387	25.61%	29,919	7.79%	70,979	18.48%	83,028	21.61%	31,163	8.11%	11,823	3.08%	12,405	3.23%	46,412	12.08%	68,468	17.82%	384,116
Alpine	118	26.70%	43	9.73%	76	17.19%	32	7.24%	14	3.17%	40	9.05%	34	7.69%	85	19.23%	75	16.97%	442
Amador	2,079	14.10%	2,919	19.79%	997	6.76%	1,482	10.05%	234	1.59%	2,915	19.76%	2,002	13.57%	2,124	14.40%	-840	-5.69%	14,752
Butte	10,909	18.78%	9,571	16.48%	5,956	10.26%	3,891	6.70%	2,828	4.87%	12,463	21.46%	4,963	8.55%	7,493	12.90%	1,338	2.30%	58,074
Calaveras	2,134	12.92%	3,155	19.11%	1,434	8.69%	1,419	8.60%	249	1.51%	3,833	23.21%	2,176	13.18%	2,111	12.79%	-1,021	-6.19%	16,511
Colusa	482	11.92%	662	16.38%	256	6.33%	285	7.05%	203	5.02%	1,159	28.67%	429	10.61%	566	14.00%	-180	-4.46%	4,042
Contra Costa	75,846	24.99%	37,140	12.24%	57,777	19.04%	44,723	14.74%	14,655	4.83%	16,274	5.36%	15,994	5.27%	41,052	13.53%	38,706	12.75%	303,461
Del Norte	1,135	18.20%	1,561	25.04%	568	9.11%	301	4.83%	227	3.64%	903	14.48%	499	8.00%	1,041	16.69%	-426	-6.84%	6,235
El Dorado	11,408	16.21%	17,030	24.19%	7,404	10.52%	5,862	8.33%	1,759	2.50%	9,272	13.17%	7,136	10.14%	10,521	14.95%	-5,622	-7.98%	70,392
Fresno	24,438	14.31%	37,832	22.16%	19,894	11.65%	14,080	8.25%	10,194	5.97%	22,295	13.06%	12,913	7.56%	29,082	17.03%	-13,394	-7.85%	170,728
Glenn	739	12.09%	1,220	19.95%	329	5.38%	208	3.40%	244	3.99%	2,011	32.89%	547	8.95%	816	13.35%	-481	-7.86%	6,114
Humboldt	9,683	25.48%	4,695	12.35%	4,808	12.65%	4,706	12.38%	2,161	5.69%	4,774	12.56%	1,624	4.27%	5,558	14.62%	4,988	13.13%	38,009
Imperial	4,551	19.15%	4,469	18.80%	2,407	10.13%	1,526	6.42%	2,774	11.67%	2,069	8.71%	1,666	7.01%	4,304	18.11%	82	0.35%	23,766
Inyo	779	14.02%	1,028	18.50%	726	13.07%	462	8.32%	254	4.57%	900	16.20%	528	9.50%	879	15.82%	-249	-4.48%	5,556
Kern	18,508	13.17%	41,404	29.46%	10,001	7.12%	9,592	6.83%	10,195	7.25%	18,636	13.33%	8,635	6.14%	23,557	16.76%	-22,896	-16.29%	140,528
Kings	2,339	11.18%	5,128	24.52%	1,312	6.27%	1,906	9.11%	955	4.57%	3,572	17.08%	1,682	8.04%	4,021	19.23%	-2,789	-13.34%	20,915
Lake	2,765	17.41%	2,128	13.40%	2,455	15.46%	1,112	7.00%	981	6.22%	2,717	17.11%	1,206	7.59%	2,518	15.85%	637	4.01%	15,882
Lassen	633	9.05%	1,356	19.38%	321	4.59%	236	3.37%	93	1.33%	2,344	33.50%	1,039	14.85%	975	13.93%	-723	-10.33%	6,997
Los Angeles	326,208	17.81%	283,472	15.47%	232,055	12.67%	333,008	18.18%	218,726	11.94%	83,133	4.54%	81,739	4.46%	273,705	14.94%	42,736	2.33%	1,832,046
Madera	3,380	11.07%	8,114	26.57%	3,701	12.12%	1,578	5.17%	1,177	3.85%	4,327	14.17%	3,687	12.07%	4,576	14.98%	-4,734	-15.50%	30,540
Marin	23,846	25.31%	5,464	5.80%	29,396	31.21%	12,633	13.41%	3,315	3.52%	1,809	1.92%	4,333	4.60%	13,403	14.23%	18,382	19.51%	94,199
Mariposa	835	13.00%	1,337	20.82%	681	10.60%	319	4.97%	193	3.01%	1,238	19.27%	755	11.75%	1,065	16.58%	-502	-7.82%	6,423
Mendocino	6,239	25.89%	2,574	10.68%	3,993	16.57%	2,564	10.64%	941	3.91%	2,785	11.56%	1,260	5.23%	3,738	15.51%	3,665	15.21%	24,094
Merced	5,719	13.17%	6,861	15.80%	6,626	15.26%	3,193	7.35%	2,435	5.61%	4,347	10.01%	6,589	15.17%	7,658	17.63%	-1,142	-2.63%	43,428
Modoc	268	10.73%	398	15.94%	141	5.65%	82	3.28%	38	1.52%	846	33.88%	338	13.54%	386	15.46%	-130	-5.21%	2,497
Mono	725	21.02%	504	14.61%	628	18.21%	255	7.39%	141	4.09%	372	10.79%	286	8.29%	538	15.60%	221	6.41%	3,449
Monterey	20,242	25.99%	10,006	12.85%	10,089	12.96%	7,664	9.84%	4,206	5.40%	3,769	4.84%	4,648	5.97%	17,230	22.15%	10,236	13.14%	77,854
Napa	8,302	21.24%	5,069	12.97%	8,703	22.27%	4,553	11.65%	2,724	6.97%	2,843	7.33%	2,114	5.41%	4,774	12.22%	3,233	8.27%	39,082
Nevada	8,994	22.28%	10,122	25.08%	4,340	10.75%	5,630	13.95%	1,193	2.96%	3,305	8.19%	2,160	5.35%	4,622	11.44%	-1,128	-2.80%	40,366
Orange	113,775	15.21%	199,029	26.61%	107,309	14.35%	66,586	8.90%	47,995	6.42%	47,094	6.30%	59,779	7.99%	106,445	14.22%	-85,254	-11.40%	748,012
Placer	24,424	16.95%	32,102	22.28%	18,148	12.59%	12,322	8.55%	3,780	2.62%	16,844	11.69%	16,286	11.30%	20,206	14.02%	-7,678	-5.33%	144,112
Plumas	1,063	15.09%	1,184	16.80%	638	9.05%	668	9.48%	134	1.90%	1,572	22.31%	770	10.93%	1,017	14.44%	-121	-1.71%	7,046
Riverside	72,652	14.10%	107,602	20.89%	61,283	11.89%	54,286	10.54%	33,930	6.59%	53,974	10.48%	38,637	7.50%	92,820	18.01%	-34,950	-6.79%	515,184
Sacramento	75,555	20.21%	61,705	16.51%	47,840	12.80%	67,064	17.94%	18,230	4.88%	27,554	7.37%	24,644	6.59%	51,264	13.70%	13,850	3.70%	373,856
San Benito	3,624	23.28%	2,170	13.94%	1,767	11.35%	1,355	8.70%	821	5.27%	1,351	8.68%	1,134	7.28%	3,348	21.50%	1,454	9.34%	15,570
San Bernardino	48,302	12.92%	81,620	21.82%	43,218	11.56%	42,163	11.27%	26,894	7.19%	36,957	9.88%	26,848	7.18%	67,994	18.18%	-33,318	-8.90%	373,996
San Diego	151,473	19.01%	200,177	25.12%	132,161	16.59%	76,430	9.59%	46,634	5.85%	33,320	4.18%	41,591	5.22%	114,924	14.44%	-48,704	-6.11%	796,710
San Francisco	70,164	28.24%	13,236	5.33%	54,089	21.77%	48,309	19.44%	36,244	14.59%	3,546	1.43%	5,133	2.07%	17,736	7.13%	56,928	22.91%	248,457
San Joaquin	19,588	15.01%	19,832	15.19%	12,408	9.51%	22,720	17.41%	6,194	4.75%	17,406	13.34%	10,877	8.33%	21,495	16.46%	-244	-0.18%	130,520
San Luis Obispo	21,292	22.63%	18,829	20.01%	12,459	13.24%	6,697	7.12%	4,069	4.33%	7,866	8.36%	6,099	6.48%	16,773	17.83%	2,463	2.62%	94,084
San Mateo	54,958	29.15%	21,132	11.21%	42,665	22.63%	24,389	12.94%	10,197	5.41%	6,906	3.66%	7,206	3.82%	21,067	11.18%	33,826	17.94%	188,520
Santa Barbara	21,508	20.84%	21,447	20.78%	19,904	19.29%	9,172	8.89%	5,603	5.43%	6,729	6.52%	4,335	4.20%	14,502	14.05%	61	0.06%	103,200
Santa Clara	102,149	25.86%	44,064	11.16%	81,980	20.76%	46,589	11.80%	22,401	5.67%	16,005	4.05%	29,169	7.39%	52,605	13.31%	58,085	14.70%	394,962
Santa Cruz	26,508	33.15%	5,543	6.93%	12,134	15.18%	10,057	12.58%	4,944	6.18%	2,098	2.62%	4,746	5.94%	13,924	17.42%	20,965	26.22%	79,954
Shasta	6,301	12.31%	11,517	22.50%	3,936	7.69%	2,899	5.66%	1,212	2.37%	10,123	19.78%	5,499	10.74%	9,703	18.95%	-5,216	-10.19%	51,190
Sierra	192	16.31%	195	16.57%	83	7.05%	99	8.41%	22	1.87%	290	24.64%	102	8.67%	194	16.48%	-3	-0.26%	1,177
Siskiyou	2,091	15.60%	2,353	17.56%	1,283	9.57%	882	6.58%	318	2.37%	3,289	24.54%	13,38	9.98%	1,849	13.80%	-262	-1.96%	13,403
Solano	20,079	19.68%	12,791	12.54%	18,588	18.22%	15,321	15.02%	4,549	4.46%	6,857	6.72%	9,805	9.61%	14,040	13.75%	7,288	7.14%	102,030
Sonoma	41,455	25.74%	14,700	9.13%	34,171	21.21%	23,898	14.84%	7,619	4.73%	8,791	5.46%	7,965	4.95%	22,464	13.94%	26,755	16.61%	161,063
Stanislaus	13,300	14.09%	21,803	23.10%	11,139	11.80%	9,207	9.75%	4,080	4.32%	15,035	15.93%	6,956	7.37%	12,866	13.64%	-8,503	-9.01%	94,386
Sutter	3,188	14.47%	5,913	26.83%	1,411	6.40%	1,503	6.82%	1,007	4.57%	4,886	22.27%	1,494	6.78%	2,137	9.69%	-2,725	-12.36%	22,039
Tehama	1,829	11.51%	2,794	17.58%	938	5.90%	468	2.94%	458	2.88%	5,414	34.07%	1,882	11.84%	2,109	13.28%	-965	-6.07%	15,892
Trinity	664	19.03%	460	13.18%	334	9.57%	195	5.59%	134	3.84%	702	20.12%	441	12.64%	560	16.03%	204	5.85%	3,490
Tulare	7,674	11.16%	19,321	28.11%	4,731	6.88%	5,838	8.49%	3,493	5.08%	10,434	15.17%	4,454	6.48%	12,826	18.63%	-11,647	-16.95%	68,771
Tuolumne	3,070	16.02%	4,737	24.72%	1,776	9.27%	1,551	8.10%	370	1.93%	3,443	17.97%	1,702	8.88%	2,513	13.11%	-1,667	-8.70%	19,162
Ventura	37,010	17.33%	50,057	23.44%	32,959	15.43%	24,843	11.63%	9,393	4.40%	11,686	5.47%	14,912	6.98%	32,711	15.32%	-13,047	-6.11%	213,571
Yolo	13,905	24.51%	6,492	11.45%	8,529	15.04%	8,963	15.80%	5,414	9.55%	3,591	6.33%	2,842	5.01%	7,002	12.31%	7,413	13.06%	56,738
Yuba	2,451	14.99%	3,195	19.55%	890	5.44%	1,356	8.30%	736	4.50%	3,799	23.24%	1,422	8.70%	2,496	15.28%	-744	-4.56%	16,345
State Totals	1,631,935	19.10%	1,521,181	17.81%	1,256,824	14.71%	1,132,160	13.25%	621,147	7.27%	594,336	6.96%	521,455	6.10%	1,263,738	14.80%	110,754	1.29%	8,542,776

== General election ==
=== Post-primary endorsements ===
Fiona Ma (D)

Political parties

- California Democratic Party

Organizations

- Reproductive Freedom for All

Poll source	Date(s) administered	Sample size	Margin of error	Fiona Ma (D)	Gloria Romero (R)	Other	Undecided
Independent Voter Project	September 23 – October 2, 2026	2,906 (LV)	± 2.5%	41%	31%	2% (Note: "Would skip the race" with 2%)	26%

=== Results ===
2026 California lieutenant gubernatorial election
Party	Candidate	Votes	%	±%
Democratic	Fiona Ma			
Republican	Gloria Romero			
Total votes				

Counties that flipped from Republican to Democratic

- Butte (largest municipality: Chico)
- Fresno (largest municipality: Fresno)
- Inyo (largest municipality: Bishop)
- Kern (largest municipality: Bakersfield)
- Merced (largest municipality: Merced)
- Orange (largest municipality: Anaheim)
- Riverside (largest municipality: Riverside)
- San Bernardino (largest municipality: San Bernardino)
- Stanislaus (largest municipality: Modesto)

== See also ==
- 2026 California elections
- 2026 United States lieutenant gubernatorial elections

== Notes ==
Partisan and media clients
