= Ben Allen (California politician) =

American politician

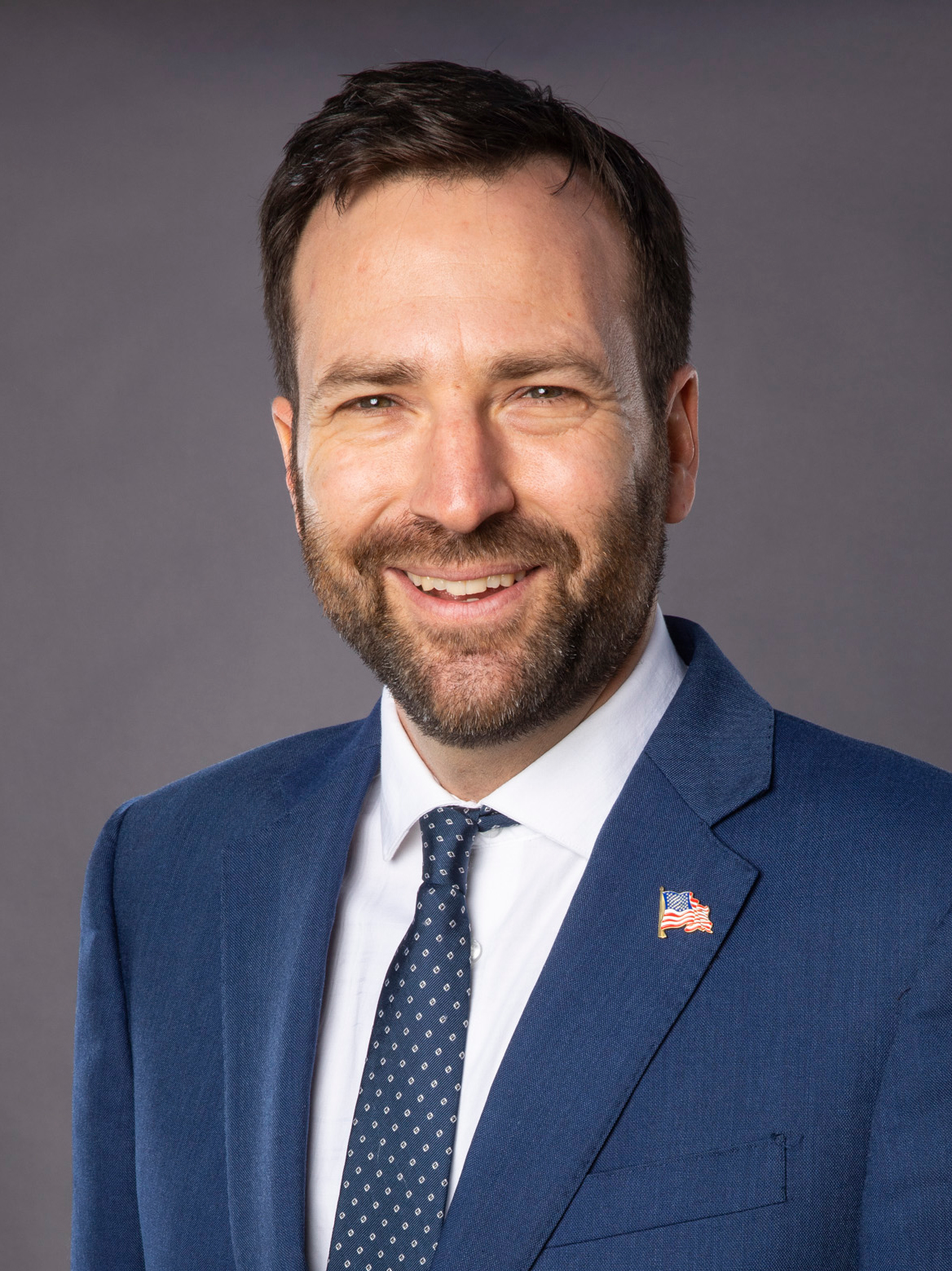
- Official portrait, 2021

Member of the California State Senate
- Incumbent
- Assumed office December 1, 2014
- Preceded by: Holly Mitchell (redistricted)
- Constituency: 26th district (2014–2022); 24th district (2022–present)

Personal details
- Born: March 13, 1978 (age 48) Santa Monica, California, U.S.
- Party: Democratic
- Spouse: Melanie
- Children: 2
- Education: Harvard University (BA); University of Cambridge (MPhil); University of California, Berkeley (JD)
- Website: State Senate website

Benjamin J. Allen (born March 13, 1978) is an American attorney and politician who has served as a member of the California State Senate from the 24th district since 2022, having previously represented the 26th district from 2014 to 2022. A member of the Democratic Party, he previously served as University of California Student Regent and as a Santa Monica–Malibu Unified School District school board member. He ran in the 2026 California Insurance Commissioner election losing to CA Working Families Party executive director Jane Kim 54.2% to 45.8%.

== Personal life and education ==
Allen was born and raised in Santa Monica, California, to a Jewish family. After graduating from Santa Monica High School, he received a bachelor of arts from Harvard University in 2000, a master of philosophy from the University of Cambridge in 2001, and a juris doctor from the University of California, Berkeley in 2008. He worked for New York Rep. José E. Serrano for two years and was admitted to the State Bar of California in 2008.

He lives in Santa Monica, California with his wife and two children.

== Political career ==
As a student at UC Berkeley, Allen served as a University of California student regent from 2007 to 2008. He served on the Santa Monica–Malibu Board of Education from 2008 until his election to the California State Senate in 2014, serving as president of the board from 2012 to 2013. He also chaired the Los Angeles County Committee on School Board Organization.

=== California State Senate ===
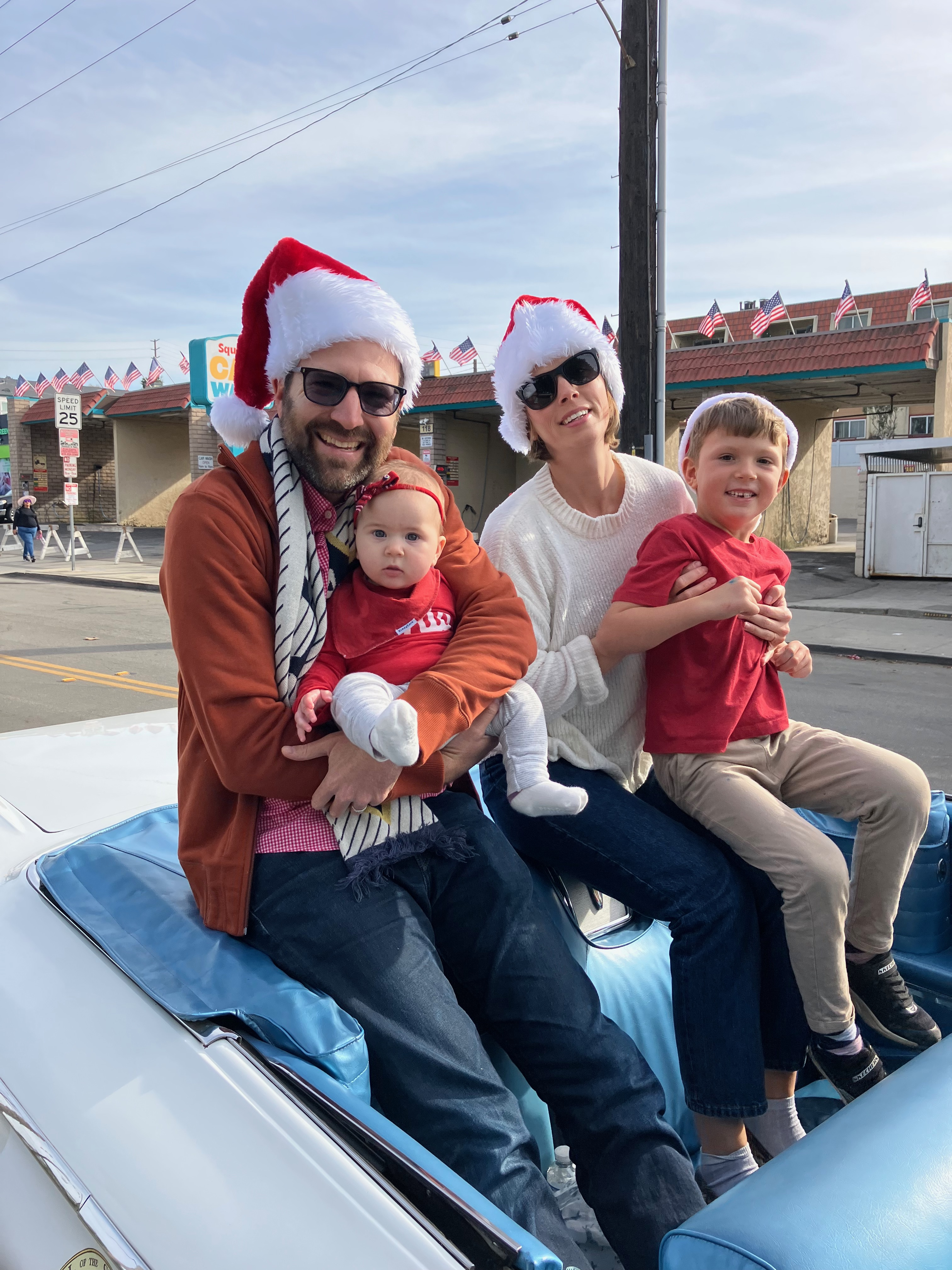
Ben Allen with his family, in the 2024 El Segundo Christmas Parade

Allen announced his candidacy for the redrawn 26th district in February 2014. His major opponents in the primary included Manhattan Beach Mayor Amy Howorth, former Assemblymember Betsy Butler, and social justice attorney Sandra Fluke.

After finishing in first place in the June 2014 primary election, he defeated Sandra Fluke in the November 2014 general election by a wide margin.

Allen successfully defended his seat four years later. He secured 77 percent of the vote in the June 2018 primary, defeating Baron Bruno, an unaffiliated realtor, and Mark Matthew Herd, Libertarian candidate and Westwood neighborhood councilman. In the November 2018 primary election, Allen defeated Bruno again, winning by a margin of 54.4 percent. His term will end on December 1, 2026.

According to a 2024 analysis of California Assembly and Senate Daily Journals by CalMatters, Allen missed 24 days of legislative session that year, the second-highest absence total among state senators, behind Sen. Henry Stern's 33 days. The analysis did not distinguish between excused and unexcused absences.

=== Fire recovery and insurance reforms ===
In January 2025, the Palisades Fire broke out in Allen's district. In the aftermath, Allen helped constituents who lost their homes, worked to bring state and federal leaders together to help with resident assistance, and secured funding to rebuild landmarks like Will Rogers State Historic Park.

Allen also wrote legislation to assist mobile home park residents who lost their homes, provide tax assistance for fire victims, and provide help to victims trying to maximize contents coverage from their insurers.

=== Environmental protection ===
One of Allen's areas of focus is environmental protection. In 2022, Allen was the author of landmark legislation to reduce plastic pollution.

In 2024, Allen was the lead author of a $10 billion bond measure to invest in safe drinking water, wildfire prevention, drought preparedness, and clean air. Voters approved the measure, known as Proposition 4, with 60% of the vote in the November 2024 election.

As Chair of the Senate Budget Subcommittee on Resources, Environmental Protection and Energy, Allen led efforts to appropriate $3.5 billion of Proposition 4 bond funding, including $598 million for wildfire prevention programs.

As Chair of the Senate Environmental Quality Committee, he helped advance California's historic climate goals, such as carbon neutrality by 2045 and 90% clean energy by 2035.

In 2017, Allen brokered a bipartisan compromise that lessened the environmental impact of off-highway vehicle use at state facilities.

=== Campaign finance reform ===
Allen authored the Voter's Choice Act in 2016, which modernized elections and expanded access to the ballot. He has worked closely with the California Clean Money Campaign, Common Cause, and the League of Women Voters on a number of transparency and political reform measures.

=== 2026 Insurance Commissioner campaign ===
On September 16, 2025, Allen announced he would run for California Insurance Commissioner in 2026, running on a platform of advocating for consumers after disasters, stabilizing the insurance market, and making government bureaucracy more transparent and accessible.

Allen initially pledged not to accept contributions from the insurance industry in his campaign. However, in February 2025, a news report found that Allen's campaign had accepted multiple donations from insurance companies. A campaign spokesperson said these would be "refunded immediately."

At the February 2026 California Democratic Party endorsing convention, Allen received the largest share of delegate votes in the Insurance Commissioner race, with approximately 42% (1,056 votes). Former San Francisco Supervisor Jane Kim finished second with roughly 40% (1,018 votes), former State Senator Steven Bradford received 9%, and Patrick Wolff received 6%. No candidate reached the 60% threshold required for an official party endorsement, and the race ended without a consensus pick.

In the primary, Ben Allen finished second -- nearly 700,000 votes behind front-runner Jane Kim.

In August 2026 after the primary, the California Democratic Party endorsed Allen's campaign.

He would later lose to Kim in the general election by a wide margin of 54.2 to 45.8 winning just 14 of the states 58 counties.

=== 2028 Olympics oversight ===
Allen chairs the state Senate's special committee on the 2028 Los Angeles Olympics. In February 2026, when Assemblymember Tina McKinnor issued a statement on behalf of the Los Angeles County legislative delegation calling for LA28 organizing chair Casey Wasserman to resign following the release of documents connecting him to Ghislaine Maxwell, Allen publicly distanced himself from the statement. Allen told the Los Angeles Times that he had not seen the statement before it was released, and that he wanted to review the report completed by the LA28 board regarding Wasserman's conduct before reaching a conclusion.

== Electoral history ==
2014 California State Senate 26th district election
Primary election
Party	Candidate	Votes	%
Democratic	Ben Allen	25,987	22.2
Democratic	Sandra Fluke	22,759	19.4
No party preference	Seth Stodder	20,419	17.4
Democratic	Betsy Butler	19,301	16.5
Democratic	Amy Howorth	18,411	15.7
Democratic	Vito Imbasciani	5,189	4.4
Democratic	Patric M. Verrone	3,446	2.9
Democratic	Barbi S. Appelquist	1,630	1.4
Total votes		117,142	100.0
General election
Democratic	Ben Allen	122,901	60.3
Democratic	Sandra Fluke	80,781	39.7
Total votes		203,682	100.0
Democratic hold			

2018 California State Senate 26th district election
Primary election
Party	Candidate	Votes	%
Democratic	Ben Allen (incumbent)	144,283	76.8
No party preference	Baron Bruno	23,119	12.3
Libertarian	Mark Matthew Herd	20,534	10.9
Total votes		187,936	100.0
General election
Democratic	Ben Allen (incumbent)	298,609	77.2
No party preference	Baron Bruno	87,974	22.8
Total votes		386,583	100.0
Democratic hold			

2022 California State Senate 24th district election
Primary election
Party	Candidate	Votes	%
Democratic	Ben Allen (incumbent)	165,421	96.2
Republican	Kristina Irwin (write-in)	6,260	3.6
Republican	Edwin P. Duterte (write-in)	213	0.1
Total votes		171,894	100.0
General election
Democratic	Ben Allen (incumbent)	248,642	67.1
Republican	Kristina Irwin	121,809	32.9
Total votes		370,451	100.0
Democratic hold			
