= Wilmer Carter =

American politician (born 1941)

Wilmer Amina Carter

Member of the California State Assembly from the 62nd district
- In office December 4, 2006 – November 30, 2012
- Preceded by: Joe Baca, Jr.
- Succeeded by: Steven Bradford (redistricted)

Personal details
- Born: July 12, 1941 (age 85) Neshoba County, Mississippi
- Party: Democratic
- Spouse: William Henry "Ratibu" Jacocks
- Children: 3
- Education: California State University, San Bernardino
- Profession: Businessperson

Wilmer Amina Carter (born July 19, 1941) is an American politician who served in the California State Assembly. She is a Democrat.

== Pre-legislative career and personal ==
Wilmer Amina Carter comes from a large, extended family and spent her childhood years on a farm in Mississippi before moving to San Bernardino.

Carter served 16 years on the Rialto Board of Education from 1983 through 1999. For 23 years from 1973 until 1996, she was a staff member for Congressman George Brown, Jr. One of her jobs was District director. She also coordinated legislative and community relations for Cal State San Bernardino.

A high school in Rialto is named after her. Wilmer Amina Carter High School is the first high school in the Inland Empire named after a living African-American woman.

Assembly member Carter graduated from San Bernardino High School and San Bernardino Valley College, and earned a bachelor's degree in English and a master's degree in education from California State University, San Bernardino.

== Legislative history ==
During her tenure, Assembly Member Carter has created, co-authored and supported laws that improve health, safety, transportation, jobs, housing and education for the citizens of the 62nd District and California.
