= Joe Baca =

American politician (born 1947)

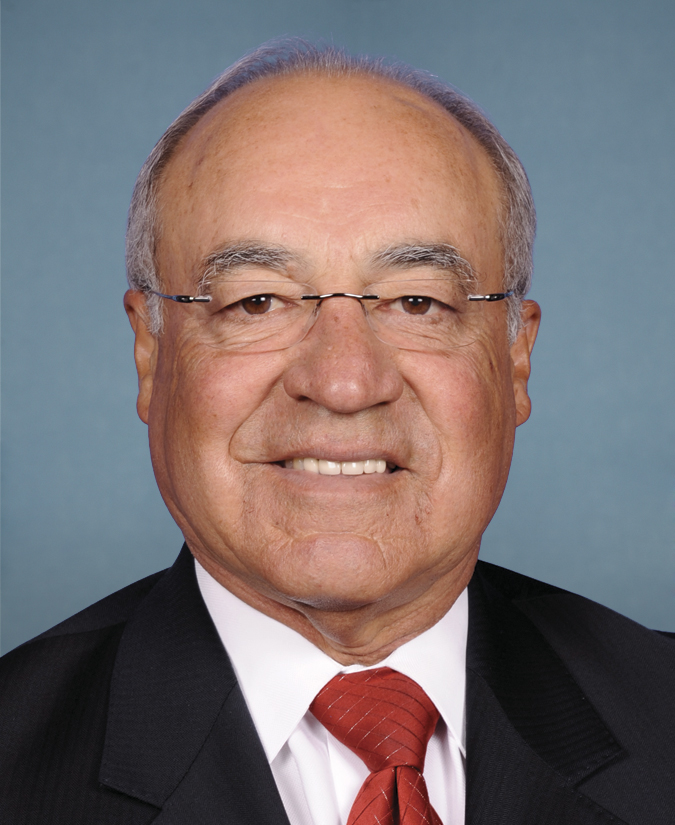

Member of the U.S. House of Representatives from California
- In office November 16, 1999 – January 3, 2013 (Note: Baca's official service begins on the date of the special election, while he was not sworn in until November 18, 1999.)
- Preceded by: George Brown Jr.
- Succeeded by: Gloria Negrete McLeod
- Constituency: 42nd district (1999–2003); 43rd district (2003–2013)

Member of the California Senate from the 32nd district
- In office December 7, 1998 – November 16, 1999
- Preceded by: Ruben Ayala
- Succeeded by: Nell Soto

Member of the California State Assembly from the 62nd district
- In office December 7, 1992 – November 30, 1998
- Preceded by: William H. Lancaster
- Succeeded by: John Longville

Personal details
- Born: Joseph Natalio Baca Sr. January 23, 1947 (age 79) Belen, New Mexico, U.S.
- Party: Democratic (before 2015, 2018–present); Republican (2015–2016); Independent (2016–2018)
- Spouse: Barbara Baca
- Children: 4, including Joe
- Relatives: Baca family
- Education: Barstow Community College (attended); California State University, Los Angeles (BA)

Military service
- Branch/service: United States Army
- Years of service: 1966–1968
- Rank: Specialist 4
- Unit: 101st Airborne Division
- Baca's voice Baca on the proposed National Museum of the American Latino. Recorded February 6, 2007

Joseph Natalio Baca Sr. (born January 23, 1947) is an American Democratic politician who served as the U.S. representative for southwestern San Bernardino County (including Fontana, Rialto, Ontario and parts of the city of San Bernardino) from 1999 to 2013.

In June 2015, Baca switched his affiliation to the Republican Party, citing his "core Christian" and pro-business beliefs. In January 2018, Baca switched his affiliation back to the Democratic Party, saying that "in my heart, I've always been a Democrat with a 100 percent voting record for labor."

Prior to his time in the House of Representatives, Baca served in the California Senate from 1998 to 1999, and the California State Assembly from 1992 to 1998.

In 2022, Baca returned to politics at the local level and was elected to the Rialto City Council. Baca currently serves as the mayor of the city of Rialto after being elected to a four-year term in 2024.

== Early life, education and career ==
Baca was born in Belen, New Mexico in 1947, the youngest of 15 children in a primarily Spanish-speaking household. His father was a railroad laborer. The family moved to Barstow, California when Joe was young, where he shined shoes at age 10, delivered newspapers, and later worked as a laborer for the Santa Fe Railroad, until he was drafted in 1966, serving in the United States Army until 1968. He did not serve in Vietnam.

Following military service, Baca attended Barstow Community College and went on to receive his bachelor's degree in sociology from California State University, Los Angeles. He worked for 15 years in community relations with General Telephone and Electric. In 1979, he was the first Latino elected to the board of trustees for the San Bernardino Valley College District. He was elected to the State Assembly in 1992, and to the State Senate in 1998.

== U.S. House of Representatives ==
=== Committee assignments ===
- Committee on Agriculture
  - Subcommittee on Department Operations, Oversight, and Credit
  - Subcommittee on Livestock, Dairy, and Poultry
  - Subcommittee on Nutrition and Horticulture (Ranking Member)
- Committee on Financial Services
  - Subcommittee on Financial Institutions and Consumer Credit
  - Subcommittee on Oversight and Investigations

=== Caucus memberships ===
- Congressional Hispanic Caucus (Former Chairman)
  - Corporate America, Technology, Communications and the Arts Task Force (Chairman)
- Blue Dog Coalition

He served on the House Financial Services Committee, where he was a member of the Subcommittee on Capital Markets, Insurance, and Government Sponsored Enterprises, and the Subcommittee on Financial Institutions and Consumer Credit. Rep. Baca also served on the House Agriculture Committee, where he was the ranking member of the Subcommittee on Departmental Operations, Oversight, Nutrition and Forestry.

Rep. Baca was the Chair of the CHC Corporate America Task Force, which aims to increase Hispanic representation in corporate America. He created and co-chaired the Congressional Sex and Violence in the Media Caucus. Other caucus memberships included the Congressional Diabetes Caucus, the Military/ Veterans Caucus, the Native American Caucus and the U.S.-Mexico Caucus.

In 2011, Rep. Baca became a co-sponsor of Bill H.R.3261 otherwise known as the Stop Online Piracy Act. The same year, he voted for the National Defense Authorization Act for Fiscal Year 2012 as part of a controversial provision that allows the government and the military to indefinitely detain American citizens and others without trial.

In March 2012, Baca and Rep. Frank Wolf (R-VA) introduced a bill that would force video game companies to put warning labels on their products. H.R. 4204, the Violence in Video Games Labeling Act, would compel game companies to label their products with "WARNING: Exposure to violent video games has been linked to aggressive behavior".

== Political campaigns ==
=== 1999 special election ===
A few months after Baca was elected to the State Senate, Congressman George Brown, Jr. died after a long illness. Baca finished first in a seven-way primary, but fell far short of a majority due to the presence of two minor Democratic candidates. In the special general election, Baca defeated Republican Elia Pirozzi with 50.4%.

Baca won a full term in 2000 with 59% of the vote. After the 2000 census, the district was renumbered as the 43rd and reconfigured as a majority-Hispanic district. Baca was handily reelected from this redrawn district in 2002, and did not face another close contest until 2012.

=== 2012 campaign ===
After the 2010 United States census, the Citizens Redistricting Commission significantly redrew California's congressional map. The bulk of Baca's former territory became the 35th District, though his home in Rialto was placed in the 31st District. Baca opted to run in the 35th, and finished first in the new all-party primary with 46.7 percent of the vote. His nearest opponent, State Senator Gloria Negrete McLeod, took 34 percent; under the new "top two" primary rules, both advanced to the general election.

A few weeks before the general election, Negrete McLeod's campaign benefited from $3.2 million in independent expenditures from the Federal Super PAC of billionaire Michael Bloomberg, who was Mayor of New York City at that time. The Super PAC ran negative advertisements in newspapers, radio, and television accusing Baca of being soft on crime and causing perchlorate water contamination in drinking water. Bloomberg had become unhappy with Baca because he had not been supportive of Bloomberg's efforts for stronger federal laws for gun control and the enactment of federal registration. Negrete McLeod defeated Baca, taking 56 percent to Baca's 44 percent.

Baca ran for Congress again, changing to the 31st District in 2014, but finished fifth in the primary with 11.2%.

In 2014, Baca also ran for Mayor of Fontana. He lost in a landslide and subsequently announced his retirement from politics. but made a comeback to the Rialto City Council in 2022.

=== 2022 campaign ===
In 2022, Baca made a political comeback after an eight-year retirement, as he was elected to a seat on the Rialto City Council.

=== 2024 campaign ===
Baca won the 2024 Rialto mayoral election, defeating incumbent Deborah Robertson and two other candidates. Baca secured 6,226 votes (40.76%) to Robertson's 4,668 votes (30.56%). The other candidates, Rafael Trujillo and Ché Rose Wright, finished with 22.55% and 6.13%, respectively.

== Controversies ==
According to the Los Angeles Times, Baca, chairman of the Congressional Hispanic Caucus, directed Caucus funds from its PAC BOLDPAC (Building Our Leadership Diversity) to the unsuccessful California campaigns of his sons, Joe Baca, Jr. and Jeremy Baca. At the time, Rep. Loretta Sanchez and five other members dropped out of the PAC in protest of these actions. They alleged that the funds, meant to elect Hispanic candidates, should not have been used to help Baca's sons run against Hispanic candidates and that in a previous race funded by the PAC, Joe Jr. had run against Hispanic candidates.

Citizens for Responsibility and Ethics in Washington (CREW) released a report stating that Rep. Baca had paid his daughter $27,000 from campaign funds and donated more than $20,000 to his sons' political campaigns from his own campaign funds. They reported accusations that were made in 2006 by former members of Baca's Washington staff that they were sent to California in 2004 for a staff retreat and pressured to work on Joe Baca, Jr.'s campaign for the state Assembly on their paid time for the senior Baca.

=== 2007 House Hispanic Caucus election ===
In January 2007, fellow Hispanic Caucus members including Loretta Sanchez, Nydia Velázquez, Hilda Solis, and Linda Sánchez wrote a letter to Baca asking for a new election with a secret ballot. They claimed that Baca was elected chair of the Caucus in a public ballot, despite Caucus rules for electing a chair that require a secret-ballot election.

On January 31, Politico reported that Rep. Baca had called Loretta Sanchez a "whore". Baca denied making the insult. Loretta Sanchez and Solis alleged that Baca made the remark in the summer of 2006.

Citing Baca's alleged insult and the perceived impropriety in Baca's election to chairman of the CHC, as well as Baca's treatment of Latina members in the CHC, Loretta Sanchez resigned from the Caucus along with her sister, three other female California members and one female member from Arizona. The two congresswomen state that they heard the remark from unnamed sources, although Politico identified California State Assemblyman Fabian Núñez as one of those who heard the insult firsthand and told Loretta Sanchez. She said that Baca confirmed the comments to her sister Linda Sánchez the day before Loretta Sanchez confronted him over the accusation.

In a February, 2014 interview in The Hill, Baca described Representative Gloria Negrete McLeod, who had defeated him in the 2012 elections after receiving $3.2 million in help from then New York Mayor Michael Bloomberg's Super PAC in the final weeks leading up to the election, as "some bimbo." Minutes later he apologized, saying he was upset because he felt it was a disservice to the voters that she had announced the day before that she would not seek re-election to the congressional seat after holding it for only two years.

== Personal life ==
Baca and his wife, Barbara, began their own business, Interstate World Travel, in San Bernardino in 1989. They have four children: Joe Jr., Jeremy, Natalie and Jennifer. Son Joe Baca, Jr. served one term as state assemblyman for California's 62nd district.

== See also ==
- Baca Family of New Mexico
- List of Hispanic and Latino Americans in the United States Congress

U.S. House of Representatives
Preceded by George Brown Jr.	Member of the U.S. House of Representatives from California's 42nd congressional district 1999–2003	Succeeded by Gary Miller
Preceded by Ken Calvert	Member of the U.S. House of Representatives from California's 43rd congressional district 2003–2013	Succeeded by Maxine Waters
Preceded by Grace Napolitano	Chair of the Congressional Hispanic Caucus; 2007–2009	Succeeded by Nydia Velázquez
U.S. order of precedence (ceremonial)
Preceded by Mary Bono as Former U.S. Representative	Order of precedence of the United States as Former U.S. Representative	Succeeded by John Kline as Former U.S. Representative
