= Newton Russell =

American politician

Newton R. Russell
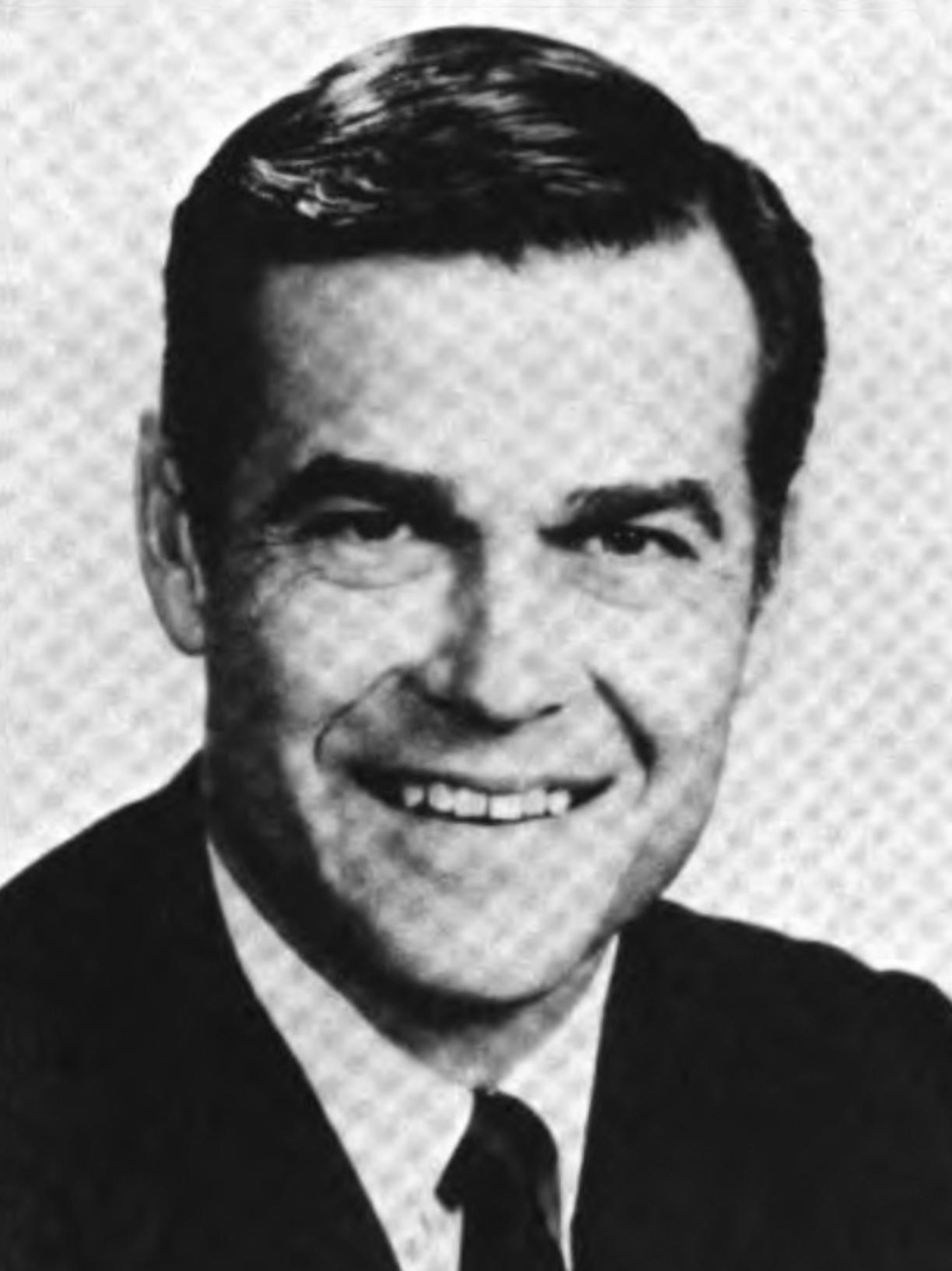
- Official portrait, 1975

Member of the California Senate from the 21st district
- In office December 20, 1974 – November 30, 1996
- Preceded by: John L. Harmer
- Succeeded by: Adam Schiff

Member of the California State Assembly from the 62nd district
- In office January 4, 1965 – November 30, 1974
- Preceded by: Tom Waite
- Succeeded by: William H. Lancaster

Personal details
- Born: June 25, 1927 Los Angeles, California, U.S.
- Died: May 18, 2013 (aged 85)
- Party: Republican
- Spouse: Diane Henderson (m. 1953)
- Children: 3
- Education: University of Southern California

Military service
- Allegiance: United States
- Branch/service: United States Navy
- Battles/wars: World War II

Newton Requa Russell (June 25, 1927 – May 18, 2013) was an American businessman and politician.

Born in Los Angeles, California, Russell attended Los Angeles High School and the Webb School of California. He served in the United States Navy during World War II. He then graduated from University of Southern California and was a special agent for Northwestern Mutual Life Insurance for twelve years. He served in the California State Assembly from 1964 to 1974 as a Republican representing the 62nd district, but following reapportionment his district was merged, and he lost his seat to fellow Republican Michael D. Antonovich in the 1974 primaries. However, a resignation that year led to a vacancy in the California State Senate for the 21st district, and Russell defeated Arthur K. Snyder in the resulting special election. He was chairman of the Senate Public Employment and Retirement Committee, and remained a member of the Senate until 1996. He died of lung cancer at his home in La Cañada Flintridge, California in 2013.
