= John Longville =

American politician

Member of the California State Assembly from the 62nd district
- In office December 7, 1998 - November 30, 2004
- Preceded by: Joe Baca
- Succeeded by: Joe Baca Jr.

Mayor of Rialto, California
- In office 1987–1998

Personal details
- Born: September 21, 1949 (age 76) Saint Paul, Minnesota, U.S.
- Party: Democratic
- Children: Regan Brookins-Longville

John Longville (born September 21, 1949, in Saint Paul, Minnesota) is an American politician who served in the California State Assembly from 1998 until 2004, representing part of San Bernardino County.

== Career ==
=== California Assembly ===
Longville succeeded Joe Baca in the California State Assembly, who was elected to the State Senate, and was succeeded by Baca's son, Joe Baca, Jr. Longville previously served as mayor of Rialto from 1987 until 1998, and for seven years prior to that as a member of the Rialto city council. Longville also served as press secretary for Congressman George Brown Jr.

In the wake of the 2000 United States presidential election recount in Florida, he wrote and secured legislative adoption of Article II, Section 2.5 of the Constitution of California, mandating that all legally-cast votes in California elections must be counted. The amendment was approved by the voters of California in the March 2002 state election.

The Rialto station is named is his honor, as Longville was one of the early proponents of the Metrolink commuter rail system.

=== San Bernardino politics ===
In September 2007, he was appointed to fill a mid-term vacancy on the board of directors of the San Bernardino Valley Water Conservation District, and was elected and reelected to that board without opposition in 2009, 2013, and 2017, continuing to serve in that position at the present time.

In November 2008, Longville was elected to the San Bernardino Community College District Board of Trustees. He was reelected in 2012, 2016, and 2020, and continues to serve on the board.

Political offices
| Preceded by Joe Baca | California State Assemblyman, 62nd District; December 7, 1998 – November 30, 2004 | Succeeded by Joe Baca, Jr. |
