= 2026 California Insurance Commissioner election =

- November 3, 2026
- Reporting: 98% as of Nov. 17, 4:56 AM PST
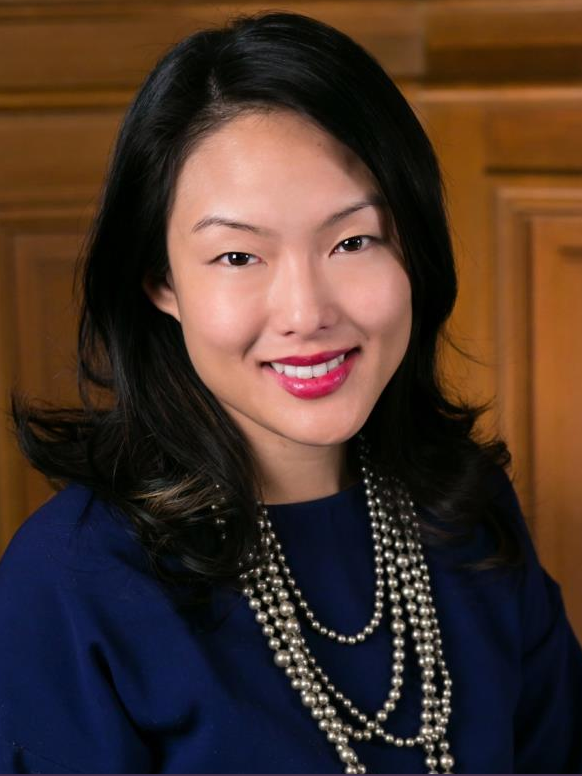

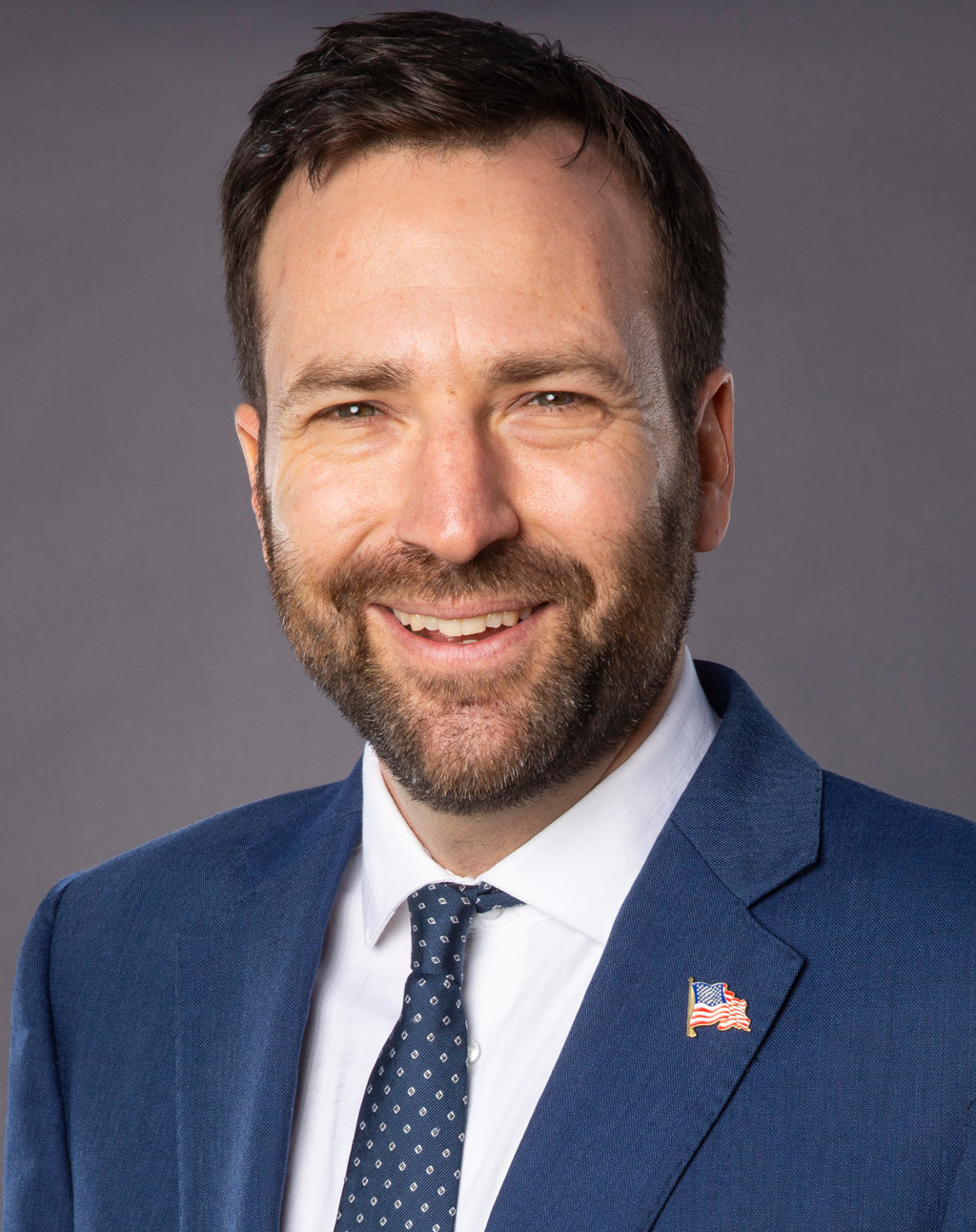
| Candidate | Jane Kim | Ben Allen |
| Party | Democratic | Democratic |
| Popular vote | 6,123,777 | 5,154,855 |
| Percentage | 54.3% | 45.7% |
- Kim: 50–60% 60–70% Allen: 50–60%
Insurance Commissioner before election
Ricardo Lara
Democratic
Elected Insurance Commissioner
Jane Kim
Democratic

The 2026 California Insurance Commissioner election was held on November 3, 2026, to elect the insurance commissioner of California. Incumbent Democratic insurance commissioner Ricardo Lara was term-limited and ineligible to run for re-election to a third term.

A nonpartisan blanket primary was held on June 2, 2026, with state senator Ben Allen and former San Francisco County supervisor Jane Kim advancing to the general election.

== Candidates ==
=== Democratic Party ===
==== Advanced to general ====
- Ben Allen, state senator from the 24th district (2014–present)
- Jane Kim, former executive director of the California Working Families Party, former San Francisco supervisor from the 6th district (2011–2019), runner-up for California's 11th senate district in 2016, and candidate for mayor of San Francisco in 2018

==== Eliminated in primary ====
- Steven Bradford, former state senator from the 35th district (2016–2024) (previously ran for lieutenant governor)
- Patrick Wolff, chess grandmaster and financial analyst

==== Declined ====
- Mike McGuire, President pro tempore of the California State Senate (2024–present) from the 2nd district (2014–present) (running for U.S. House, endorsed Allen)

=== Republican Party ===
==== Eliminated in primary ====
- Eric Thor Aarnio, contractor
- Merritt Farren, attorney
- Robert Howell, runner-up for Insurance Commissioner in 2022
- Stacy Korsgaden, insurance agent
- Sean Lee, finance executive

=== American Independent Party ===
==== Eliminated in primary ====
- Keith Davis, insurance agent

=== Peace and Freedom Party ===
==== Eliminated in primary ====
- Eduardo "Lalo" Vargas, high school teacher and candidate for Los Angeles's 14th City Council district in 2024

== Primary election ==
=== Endorsements ===
Ben Allen (D)

U.S. senators

- Alex Padilla, California (2021–present)
- Adam Schiff, California (2024–present)

U.S. representatives

- Nanette Barragán, CA-44 (2017–present)
- Julia Brownley, CA-26 (2013–present)
- Laura Friedman, CA-30 (2025–present)
- George Whitesides, CA-27 (2025–present)

Statewide officials

- Dave Jones, former insurance commissioner of California (2011–2019)

State legislators

- Jesse Gabriel, AD-46 (2018–present)
- Lena Gonzalez, majority leader of the California Senate (2024–present) from SD-33 (2019–present)
- Monique Limón, SD-21 (2020–present)
- Mike McGuire, SD-02 (2014–present)
- Robert Rivas, speaker of the California State Assembly (2023–present) from AD-29 (2018–present)
- Tom Umberg, SD-34 (2018–present)
- 36 other state legislators

Labor unions

- California Federation of Teachers (co-endorsement with Kim)
- UFCW Western States Council (co-endorsement with Kim)

Organizations

- California Environmental Voters
- Consumer Federation of California

Newspapers

- East Bay Times
- La Opinión
- The Mercury News
- The Press Democrat
Steven Bradford (D)

U.S. representatives

- Adam Gray, CA-13 (2025–present)
- Luz Rivas, CA-29 (2025–present)

Statewide officials

- Fiona Ma, treasurer of California (2019–present)
- Shirley Weber, secretary of state of California (2021–present)

Local officials

- Karen Bass, mayor of Los Angeles (2022–present)

Labor unions

- California Correctional Peace Officers Association
- California State Building and Construction Trades Council
- International Brotherhood of Teamsters California

Newspapers

- Sun-Reporter
Jane Kim (D)

U.S. senators

- Bernie Sanders, Vermont (2007–present) (Independent)

U.S. representatives

- Ro Khanna, CA-17 (2017–present)

Statewide officials

- Malia Cohen, state controller of California (2023-present)
- Eleni Kounalakis, lieutenant governor of California (2019–present)

Local officials

- Yesenia Muñeton, member of the Garden Grove City Council for the 5th district
- Vicente Sarmiento, Orange County Supervisor, 2nd district (2023–present)

Labor unions

- California Faculty Association
- California Federation of Teachers (co-endorsement with Allen)
- California Teachers Association
- National Union of Healthcare Workers
- SEIU California
- SEIU United Healthcare Workers West
- United Auto Workers Region 6
- UFCW Western States Council (co-endorsement with Allen)

Organizations

- California Working Families Party
- California Young Democrats
- Knock LA
- Harvey Milk LGBTQ Democratic Club
- National Women's Political Caucus
- Orange County Young Democrats
- Our Revolution
- San Diego Democrats for Equality

Newspapers

- Bay Area Reporter
- San Francisco Bay Guardian
Stacy Korsgaden (R)

State legislators

- Brian Jones, minority leader of the California State Senate (2022–present) from SD-40 (2018–present)

Political parties

- California Republican Party
Patrick Wolff (D)

Newspapers

- McClatchy Media California (Note: The Sacramento Bee, The Modesto Bee, The Fresno Bee, Merced Sun-Star, and The Tribune)
- San Francisco Chronicle
- Southern California News Group (Note: Daily Breeze, Inland Valley Daily Bulletin, Press-Telegram, Los Angeles Daily News, Orange County Register, Pasadena Star-News, Redlands Daily Facts, The Press-Enterprise , The San Bernardino Sun, San Gabriel Valley Tribune, and Whittier Daily News)
Eduardo Vargas (PFP)

Political parties

- Green Party of California
- Peace and Freedom Party

=== Polling ===
No independent public polls were released during the primary. A poll commissioned by the Insurance Fairness Project found that 62% of likely voters said they were very concerned about the cost of home insurance, and 43% said they had no confidence that California's insurance system could withstand future extreme weather disasters.

According to a May 2026 internal poll from the Wolff campaign, cited by Politico, Kim held a slight lead over other candidates among decided voters ahead of the June 2 primary.

Hypothetical polling

| Poll source | Date(s) administered | Sample size (Note: Key: A – all adults RV – registered voters LV – likely voters V – unclear) | Margin of error | Ben Allen (D) | Jane Kim (D) | Steven Bradford (D) | Robert Howell (R) | Eduardo Vargas (PF) | Patrick Wolff (D) | Undecided |
|---|---|---|---|---|---|---|---|---|---|---|
| Probolsky Research/Allen internal | September 6–11, 2025 | 1000 (RV) | ± 3.3% | 10% | not polled | 5% | 22% | 5% | 5% | 52% |
| Lake Research Partners/Kim internal | December 11–16, 2025 | 600 (LV) | ± 4.0% | 5% | 10% | 2% | 4% | 4% | 4% | 51% |
| FM3 Research/Wolff internal | March 9–16, 2026 | 637 (LV) | ± 4.0% | 8% | 9% | 1% | 4% | 3% | 4% | 50% |

=== Results ===
Results by county Kim: 10–20%; 20–30%; 30–40%; 40–50%; Allen: 20–30%; 30–40%; Korsgaden: 10–20%; 20–30%; 30–40%; Howell: 10–20%; 20–30%

Primary election results
| Party | Candidate | Votes | % |
|---|---|---|---|
| Democratic | Jane Kim | 2,328,836 | 27.40 |
| Democratic | Ben Allen | 1,649,501 | 19.41 |
| Republican | Stacy A. Korsgaden | 1,320,966 | 15.54 |
| Republican | Robert P. Howell | 649,093 | 7.64 |
| Democratic | Patrick Wolff | 615,069 | 7.24 |
| Republican | Merritt Farren | 570,669 | 6.71 |
| Republican | Sean Lee | 458,056 | 5.39 |
| Democratic | Steven Bradford | 416,998 | 4.91 |
| Peace and Freedom | Eduardo "Lalo" Vargas | 248,039 | 2.92 |
| Republican | Eric Thor Aarnio | 158,603 | 1.87 |
| American Independent | Keith W. Davis | 83,994 | 0.99 |
| Total votes | | 8,499,824 | 100.0 |

== General election ==
=== Post-primary endorsements ===
Ben Allen (D)

Individuals

- Patrick Wolff, primary candidate

Political parties

- California Democratic Party
Jane Kim (D)

Individuals

- Dolores Huerta, labor leader

=== Polling ===
| Poll source | Date(s) administered | Sample size | Margin of error | Ben Allen (D) | Jane Kim (D) | Other | Undecided |
|---|---|---|---|---|---|---|---|
| Independent Voter Project | September 23 – October 2, 2026 | 2,906 (LV) | ± 2.5% | 11% | 14% | 10% (Note: "Would skip the race" with 10%) | 64% |

=== Results ===
2026 California Insurance Commissioner election
| Party | Candidate | Votes | % | ±% |
|---|---|---|---|---|
| Democratic | Jane Kim | 6,123,777 | 54.3 | |
| Democratic | Ben Allen | 5,154,855 | 45.7 | |
| Total votes | | 11,278,632 | 100.0 | |
| Democratic hold | | | | |

== See also ==
- 2026 California elections
- 2026 California gubernatorial election
