= William H. Lancaster =

American politician (1931–2000)

Member of the California State Assembly from the 62nd district
- In office December 2, 1974 - November 30, 1992
- Preceded by: Newton Russell
- Succeeded by: Joe Baca

Member of the California State Assembly from the 49th district
- In office June 19, 1972 - November 30, 1974
- Preceded by: Peter F. Schabarum
- Succeeded by: Julian Dixon

Personal details
- Born: April 29, 1931 Bakersfield, California, US
- Died: January 2, 2000 (aged 68)
- Party: Republican
- Spouse: Treece Whittaker (m. 1951 died 1992)
- Children: 3

William Howard Lancaster (April 29, 1931 – January 2, 2000) was a member of the California State Assembly for the 62nd district from 1972 to 1992.

Lancaster was born in Bakersfield, California and raised in Sacramento, California and Los Angeles County. He entered politics with election to the Duarte, California city council in 1958. He also served several terms as mayor of that city.

Lancaster was elected to the California State Assembly in a special election in June 1972. The election was held because Pete Schabarum had resigned to become a member of the Los Angeles County Board of Supervisors. Lancaster represented a district that covered eastern Los Angeles County and western San Bernardino County including the cities of Covina and Upland. He served in office until 1992.

== Sources ==
- register of Lancaster papers from the California State Archives
