= Josh Fryday =

American politician and Chief Service Officer of California (born 1981)

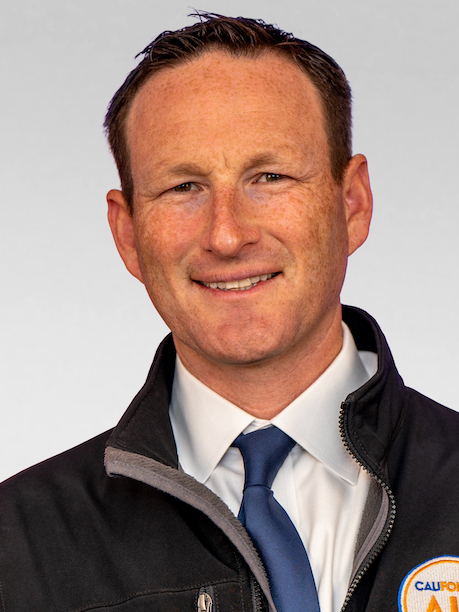
- Official portrait, 2024

Chief Service Officer of California
- Incumbent
- Assumed office September 1, 2019
- Governor: Gavin Newsom
- Preceded by: Karen Baker

Member of the Novato City Council
- In office December 8, 2015 – August 27, 2019
- Preceded by: Jeanne MacLeamy
- Succeeded by: Amy Peele (redistricted)

Personal details
- Born: February 8, 1981 (age 45) Novato, California, U.S.
- Party: Democratic
- Spouse: Mollye Fryday
- Children: 3
- Education: University of California, Berkeley (BA, JD)

Military service
- Branch/service: United States Navy
- Years of service: 2009–2013
- Rank: Lieutenant
- Unit: Navy Judge Advocate General's Corps

Josh Matthew Fryday (born February 8, 1981) is an American attorney, politician, and former naval officer serving as chief service officer of California under governor Gavin Newsom since 2019. A member of the Democratic Party, he previously served on the Novato city council from 2015 to 2019, including as mayor in 2018.

Fryday was a candidate for lieutenant governor of California in the 2026 election.

== Early life and education ==
Fryday was born on February 8, 1981 to Robin and Doug Fryday, and raised in Novato, California. He earned a Bachelor of Arts degree in political science from the University of California, Berkeley in 2003. He obtained a Juris Doctor degree from the UC Berkeley School of Law in 2009, specializing in energy, environment, and natural resources law. During his studies, he clerked with the U.S. Attorney's Office and the San Francisco District Attorney's Office under then-district attorney Kamala Harris.

== Military service ==
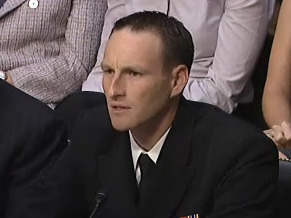
Fryday testifying to the U.S. Senate Judiciary Committee, 2013.

From 2009 to 2013, Fryday served as a lieutenant in the United States Navy Judge Advocate General's Corps, where he worked on military commissions at Guantanamo Bay detention camp, and assisted in disaster relief efforts in Japan following the 2011 Tōhoku earthquake and tsunami.

== Political career ==
=== Novato city government (2015–2019) ===
In 2015, Fryday ran for a seat on the city council of Novato, California, as part of a group that sought to challenge incumbents Jeanne MacLeamy and Eric Lucan. Fryday led the field in campaign contributions, raising a total of $55,000, with the majority of funds coming from outside Marin County and outside California, which drew criticism from other candidates during the election. He successfully won the election and was sworn in on December 8, 2015, by his mother, Robin Fryday. Alongside him, fellow councilor Pam Drew was also elected.

During his tenure on the city council, Fryday contributed to initiatives aimed at enhancing public engagement and placed a strong emphasis on sustainability efforts. After being appointed as Chief Service Officer of California, Fryday announced his intention to resign from his city council seat on August 27, 2019, with the Marin Independent Journal noting that his resignation would lead to a split on the city council. The city council decided that the seat would remain vacant until the next election in 2019. The seat, now for the 5th district instead of an at-large district, was filled by Amy S. Peele.

=== State government (2019–present) ===
On July 12, 2019, Fryday was appointed by California Governor Gavin Newsom to become the Chief Service Officer of California, with his term beginning on September 1, 2019. As Chief Service Officer, he was responsible for the state’s volunteer programs, which included efforts to encourage involvement in addressing climate change. In this role, he implemented paid benefits for organizers to assist cities in mobilizing to combat climate change, crediting his military background as a key factor in those efforts. Fryday led and launched several initiatives, including the California Climate Action Corps and the #CaliforniansForAll College and Youth Jobs Corps.

Fryday helped recruit tens of thousands of Californians to participate in service programs, resulting in the creation of a service force larger than the U.S. Peace Corps, according to The New York Times. In 2024, President Joe Biden launched the American Climate Corps, largely based on the model Fryday developed in California. Fryday is also responsible for the organization and administration of AmeriCorps programs in California, and has actively worked to counter the Trump administration's deep cuts to AmeriCorps.

In March 2025, Fryday announced his candidacy for lieutenant governor of California in the 2026 election. During the June 2025 Los Angeles protests and the subsequent deployment of active duty servicemembers and the California National Guard to Los Angeles, Fryday was one of the first state officials to visit the base housing the troops. He spoke out against the deployment, stating that it was a waste of the troops' time and funding.

Fryday ultimately won 14.73% vote in the primary and finished third, failing to advance to the general election.

== Personal life ==
Fryday is married to Mollye Fryday, a public school teacher. They have three sons and reside in Davis, California, having previously resided in Novato. Fryday is Jewish.

== Electoral history ==
Electoral history of Eric Garcetti
Year	Office	Party	Primary			General			Result	Swing	Ref.
Year	Office	Party	Total	%	P.	Total	%	P.	Result	Swing	Ref.
2015	Novato City Council	Nonpartisan	No primary held			5,322	19.04%	1st	Won	N/A	
2026	Lieutenant Governor of California	Democratic	1,256,824	14.73	3rd	Did not advance			Lost	N/A	
