= Joe Baca Jr. =

American politician

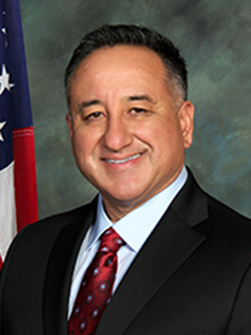
- Official portrait, 2020

Vice Chair of San Bernardino County
- Incumbent
- Assumed office January 8, 2025
- Preceded by: Paul Cook

Member of the San Bernardino County Board of Supervisors from the 5th district
- Incumbent
- Assumed office December 8, 2020
- Preceded by: Josie Gonzales

Member of the California State Assembly from the 62nd district
- In office December 6, 2004 – November 30, 2006
- Preceded by: John Longville
- Succeeded by: Wilmer Carter

Personal details
- Born: October 8, 1969 (age 56) Barstow, California, U.S.
- Party: Democratic
- Spouse: Jennifer Baca
- Children: 3
- Education: San Bernardino Valley College (AA); California State University, San Bernardino (BA, MA)
- Occupation: Education

Joseph Natalio Baca Jr. (born October 8, 1969) is an American educator and politician who served one term as a member of the California State Assembly from the 62nd District from 2004 until 2006.

== Early life and education ==
Baca was born in Barstow, California. He received his Associate degree from San Bernardino Valley College and his Bachelor of Arts and Master of Arts from California State University, San Bernardino.

== Career ==
Baca was a teacher at Rialto High School. He was elected to the California State Assembly in 2004, and served for one term. He stepped down to make an unsuccessful run for the State Senate in 2006, losing the primary to Gloria Negrete McLeod. Baca later served on the Rialto City Council. He is the son of former Congressman Joe Baca; his brother Jeremy made an unsuccessful bid to succeed him in the Assembly, as he lost the primary to Wilmer Carter.

In 2019, Baca announced a run for San Bernardino County Supervisor (5th District). His legislative priorities included addressing homelessness in California, promoting economic development, and improving local infrastructure. He was elected in 2020.

== Personal life ==
Baca is married with three children. He also has two grandchildren.

== See also ==
- Baca family of New Mexico

Political offices
Preceded by John Longville	California State Assemblyman, 62nd District; 2004–2006	Succeeded by Wilmer Carter
Preceded by Paul Cook	Vice Chair of San Bernardino County; 2025–Present	Succeeded by Incumbent
Preceded by Josie Gonzales	Member of the San Bernardino County Board of Supervisors from District 4; 2020–Present	Succeeded by Incumbent
