= Tina McKinnor =

American politician

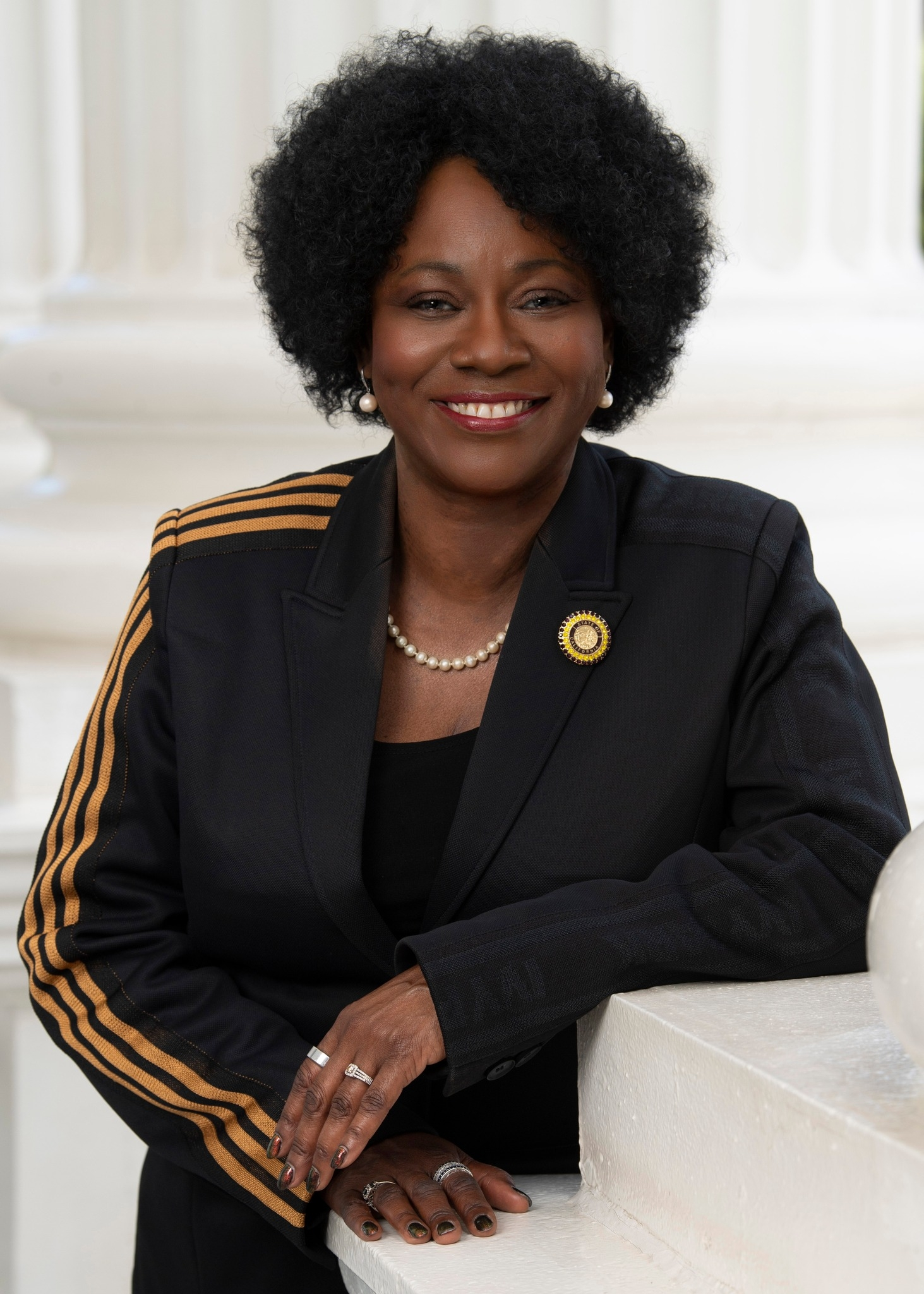
- Official portrait, 2023

Member of the California State Assembly
- Incumbent
- Assumed office June 20, 2022
- Preceded by: Autumn Burke
- Constituency: 62nd district (2022); 61st district (2022–present)

Personal details
- Born: Tina Simone McKinnor; September 30, 1960 (age 66) California, U.S.
- Party: Democratic
- Education: Los Angeles Southwest College (AS); California State University, Dominguez Hills (BS)

Tina Simone McKinnor (born September 30, 1964) is an American politician serving as a member of the California State Assembly for the 61st district, encompassing portions of the Westside and the South Bay regions of Los Angeles County, including Inglewood, Hawthorne, and Lawndale.

== Education ==
McKinnor earned an Associate's Degree in business administration and accounting from Los Angeles Southwest College and a Bachelor of Science in Accounting from California State University, Dominguez Hills.

== Career ==
McKinnor began her career with the Los Angeles County Office of Education, serving as an accounting clerk and auditor. During the 2004 United States presidential election, McKinnor worked for John Kerry's presidential campaign as co-chair of African-Americans for Kerry. She was also a Kerry delegate to the 2004 Democratic National Convention. She was the political treasurer for the Kaufman Legal Group and worked on campaigns for state Senator Steven Bradford and state Assemblywoman Autumn Burke.

Prior to being elected to the state assembly, McKinnor was a civic engagement director for L.A. Voice, a community advocacy organization, and previously served as chief of staff to several members of the California State Assembly. In 2019, she was the California campaign strategist for PL+US, an organization that advocates for paid leave policies. McKinnor also worked as Operations Director for the California Democratic Party.

On June 7, 2022, McKinnor won a special election to succeed Autumn Burke in the California State Assembly, defeating Lawndale Mayor Robert Pullen-Miles, a fellow Democrat, in an upset.

McKinnor is a member of the California Legislative Progressive Caucus.

== Electoral history ==
2022 California State Assembly 62nd district special election Vacancy resulting from the resignation of Autumn Burke
Primary election
Party	Candidate	Votes	%
Democratic	Tina McKinnor	11,213	39.0
Democratic	Robert Pullen-Miles	9,945	34.6
Democratic	Nico Ruderman	3,794	13.2
Democratic	Angie Reyes English	3,777	13.1
Total votes		28,729	100.0
General election
Democratic	Tina McKinnor	31,348	52.5
Democratic	Robert Pullen-Miles	28,359	47.5
Total votes		59,707	100.0
Democratic hold			

2022 California State Assembly 61st district election
Primary election
Party	Candidate	Votes	%
Democratic	Robert Pullen-Miles	24,322	38.6
Democratic	Tina McKinnor	20,478	32.5
Republican	James Arlandus Spencer	8,942	14.2
Democratic	Angie Reyes English	6,777	10.7
Democratic	Nico Ruderman	2,540	4.0
Total votes		63,059	100.0
General election
Democratic	Tina McKinnor (incumbent) (Note: Candidate was not an incumbent during the primary but was an incumbent in the general election after winning the special election for the seat. The special election was held on the same day as the primary.)	58,888	63.6
Democratic	Robert Pullen-Miles	33,691	36.4
Total votes		92,579	100.0
Democratic hold			

2024 California State Assembly 61st district election
Primary election
Party	Candidate	Votes	%
Democratic	Tina McKinnor (incumbent)	52,273	79.5
Republican	Alfonso Hernandez	13,487	20.5
Total votes		65,760	100.0
General election
Democratic	Tina McKinnor (incumbent)	121,661	76.5
Republican	Alfonso Hernandez	37,375	23.5
Total votes		159,036	100.0
Democratic hold			
