= Autumn Burke =

American politician (born 1973)

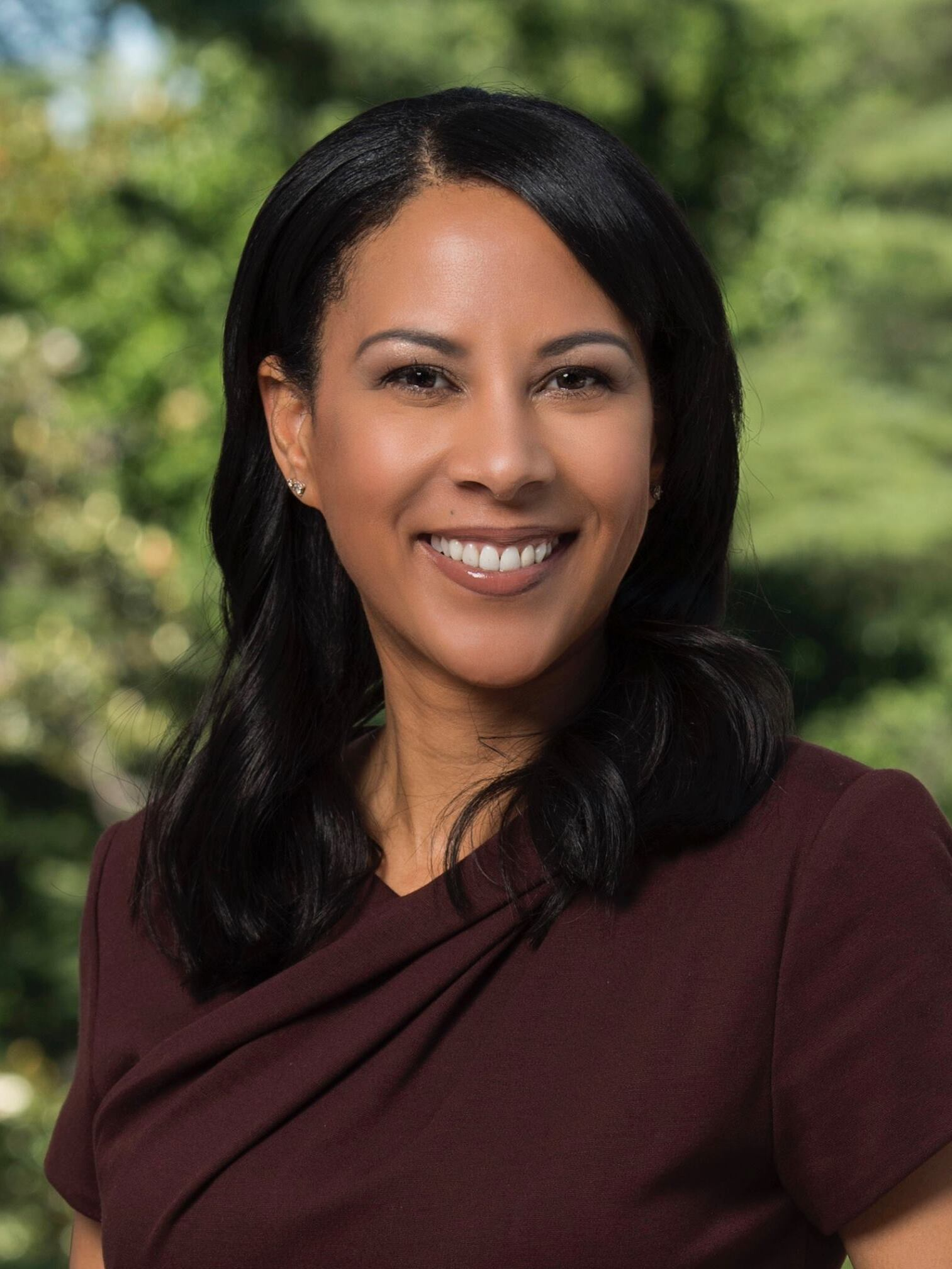
- Official portrait, 2018

Member of the California State Assembly from the 62nd district
- In office December 1, 2014 – February 1, 2022
- Preceded by: Steven Bradford
- Succeeded by: Tina McKinnor

Personal details
- Born: Autumn Roxanne Burke; November 23, 1973 (age 52) Los Angeles County, California, U.S.
- Party: Democratic
- Spouse: Jon Buttemere (m. 2022)
- Children: 1
- Relatives: Yvonne Brathwaite Burke (mother)
- Education: University of Southern California (BA)

Autumn Roxanne Burke (born November 23, 1973) is an American consultant and former politician who served as a member of the California State Assembly from 2014 until her resignation in 2022. The daughter of U.S. Congresswoman Yvonne Brathwaite Burke, she was the first child born to woman who was a sitting member of Congress. Originally in business, she entered politics in 2014 after incumbent Assemblyman Steven Bradford retired to run for California State Senate, declaring her campaign late but defeating other candidates. A Democrat, she represented the 62nd district until resigning for family reasons and subsequently returned to consulting.

== Early life and career ==
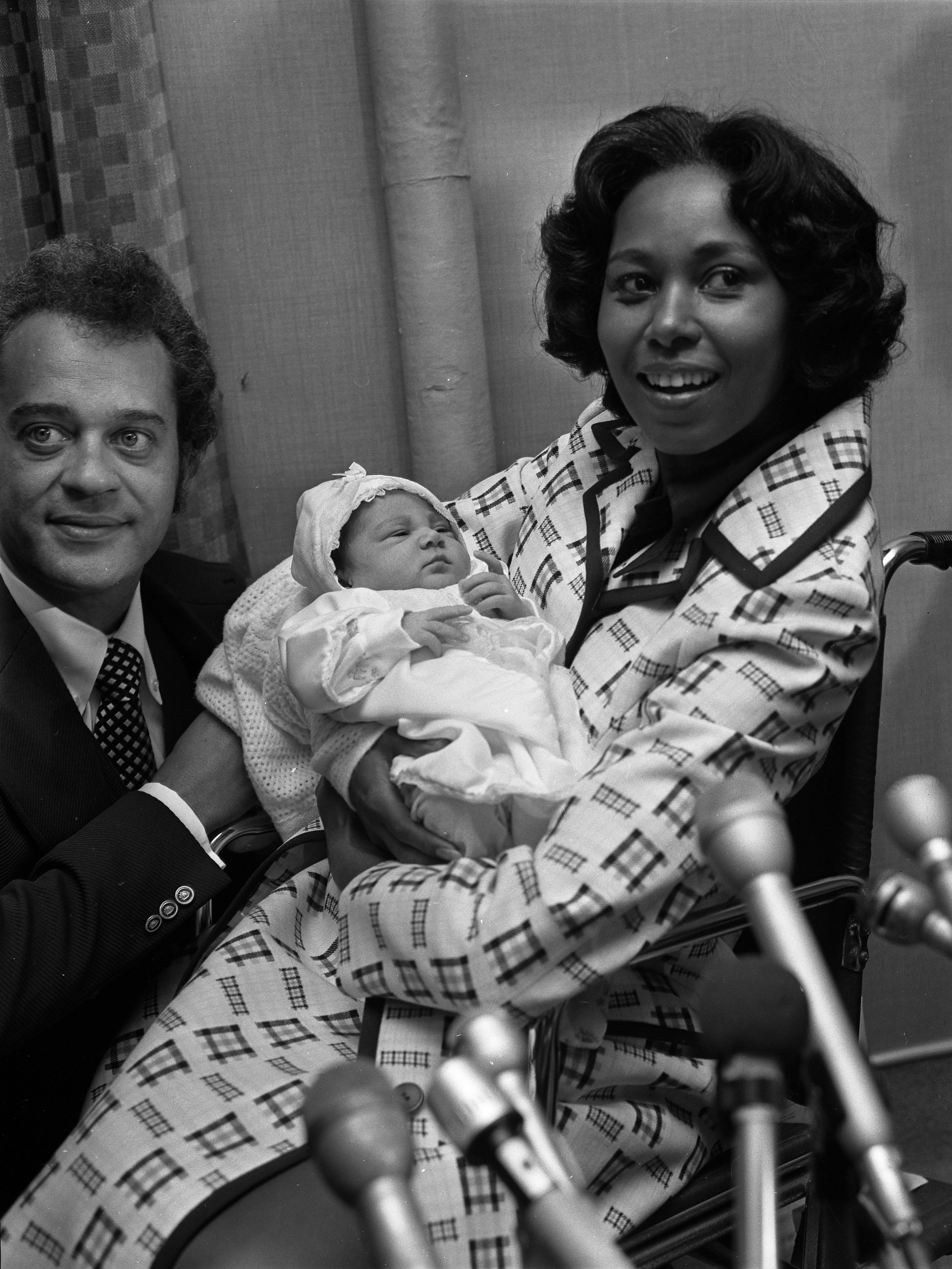
Burke being held by her mother, Yvonne, after her birth. Her father, William, is beside them.

Autumn Roxanne Burke was born on November 23, 1973, in Los Angeles to Yvonne Brathwaite Burke and William A. Burke; her mother, Yvonne, was serving in the United States House of Representatives at the time and was the first Black woman elected to it from California, with Yvonne being the first member of the U.S. Congress to become pregnant, give birth, and be granted maternity leave while in office. Prior to her birth, her parents attended a baby shower in China hosted during the International Year of the Woman, which was attended by Congresswoman Patricia Schroeder, Schroeder's husband, and many other women from the U.S. House.

She has an older stepsister, Christine, from William's previous marriage; she later ran for the Los Angeles Community College District Board of Trustees in 2018. She and her mother appeared together on the March 1974 cover of Ebony for a piece by Yvonne titled "The Kind of World I Want for My Child." Despite growing up around many politicians, including spending time with them during holidays, she did not want a career in politics and instead aspired to work in business.

She graduated from the Westlake School for Girls in 1991, earned a bachelor's degree in theater from the University of Southern California in 1995, and received a certificate in broadcast journalism from the University of California, Los Angeles. Before entering politics, she worked as a real estate agent for Keller Williams Realty, served as vice president of LA Events Inc. and director of community relations for the Los Angeles Marathon, and founded the consulting firm Mandeville Group LLC.

== Political career ==
While consulting for an energy efficiency company, she worked with Assemblyman Steven Bradford on a solar energy bill, which started her involvement in politics. In 2014, after persuading her parents, she declared her candidacy for the 62nd Assembly district late in the 2014 California State Assembly election. Despite announcing late, she won the primary against seven other candidates, and then defeated Republican Ted J. Grose in the general election.

While in the State Assembly, she worked on extending California's Cap‑and‑Trade program, building climate resiliency, wildfire abatement, and strengthening reproductive‑health protections. She also helped secure revenue by negotiating California's implementation of South Dakota v. Wayfair and authored a loophole closure that provided tax relief to small businesses and funded expansions of state safety‑net programs. On January 31, 2022 she announced on social media that she would resign from the Assembly the next day to spend more time with her family. She was succeeded by civic engagement director Tina McKinnor in a special election.

== Electoral history ==
Electoral history of Kevin Kiley
| Year | Office | Party | Primary | | | General | | | Result | Swing | Ref. |
| Year | Office | Party | Total | % | P. | Total | % | P. | Result | Swing | Ref. |
|---|---|---|---|---|---|---|---|---|---|---|---|
| 2014 | California State Assembly (62nd) | Democratic | 14,933 | 40.9% | 1st | 54,304 | 75.9% | 1st | Won | Hold | |
| 2016 | California State Assembly (62nd) | Democratic | 67,691 | 99.9% | 1st | 123,699 | 77.2% | 1st | Won | Hold | |
| 2018 | California State Assembly (62nd) | Democratic | 67,691 | 99.9% | 1st | 123,699 | 77.2% | 1st | Won | Hold | |
| 2020 | California State Assembly (62nd) | Democratic | 82,532 | 84.4% | 1st | 158,832 | 80.9% | 1st | Won | Hold | |
