= Professional Engineers in California Government =

Professional Engineers in California Government (PECG)
- Abbreviation: PECG
- Headquarters: 455 Capitol Mall, Suite 501, Sacramento, CA 95814
- Members: 13,000
- Website: www.pecg.org
- Remarks: Founded 1962

Professional Engineers in California Government (PECG) is a union representing engineers and related professionals employed by the state of California.

== Overview ==
In 1978, PECG fought for and won the exclusive right to represent engineers and related classes (architects, landscape architects, land surveyors, environmental specialists, engineering geologists, etc.) in State Bargaining Unit 9.

In 2003, PECG negotiated a landmark Memorandum of Understanding (MOU) to achieve pay parity, a long sought goal. By 2008, PECG-represented employees received pay raises to bring their salaries in line with their counterparts in California's large local public agencies.

State budget deficits, furloughs, and wasteful outsourcing are among the many challenges facing PECG and the members.

PECG represents members with grievances, arbitrations, and a variety of other claims and appeals. Leaders elected by PECG's 13,000 members establish PECG's policies. PECG is a volunteer organization assisted by professional negotiators, consultants, attorneys, and Sacramento lobbyists and is not affiliated with any organization or union.

PECG maintains offices in Sacramento, San Francisco, and Los Angeles (Glendale) to service members in 17 geographical Sections. PECG offers members life, disability, and other insurance benefits at group rates.

== Documentaries ==
PECG has sponsored and produced several Emmy Award-winning documentaries that have been seen by millions of viewers around the country.

The Next Frontier: Engineering the Golden Age of Green focuses on the renewable, clean energy technologies that can improve our future and create significant economic opportunities. This one-hour documentary takes the viewer around the world in search of technologies and policies that will address the problem of excessive carbon dioxide emissions and our dependence on foreign oil. It features interviews with some of the top energy and economic experts along with educators and high-level government officials, all striving to develop clean energy solutions and alternatives to burning fossil fuels.

A Span in Time tells the saga of the 2007 Labor Day weekend Bay Bridge construction project, with the now-legendary C.C. Myers as the contractor. During a three-day bridge closure, Myers’ and Caltrans’ teams demolished and removed a football field-size bridge, rolled in a new pre-constructed replacement span, and finished the challenging job eleven hours ahead of schedule. The film tells the story from the perspectives of the construction contractor, Caltrans engineers and designers, and two of the reporters who covered the story. Cartoon animation introduces soon-to-be-legendary TV anchor "Max Tabloid," who reports on the story as it unfolds on the screen.

Amazing: The Rebuilding of the MacArthur Maze is a half-hour television special which tells the story of the fiery collapse and rebuilding (in only 26 days) of a key connector in the Bay Area's MacArthur Maze, where three major freeways meet just east of the San Francisco-Oakland Bay Bridge. Amazing tells the story of the Maze reconstruction from the perspectives of all the main players in the drama: the now legendary contractor C.C. Myers; Caltrans Director Will Kempton and his Caltrans engineers; the Arizona steel fabricator whose company built the steel girders; the firefighter who responded to the accident; and the reporters who covered the story.

The Bridge So Far: A Suspense Story is a one-hour documentary on the often outrageous and always controversial history and status of the San Francisco-Oakland Bay Bridge. Tragic, frustrating, comical, and historic, this documentary/news special follows the Bridge from its original construction through the 1989 Loma Prieta earthquake up to the present day. It recounts the progress, delays, setbacks, and politics during the design and construction of a new, safe bridge to re-complete the connection across the Bay between San Francisco and Oakland. This was much more than a huge design and construction project. It was local, regional, state, and even federal politics; dollars and delays; finances and finger pointing; the U.S. Navy vs. Caltrans; northern vs. southern alignments; skyway vs. suspension bridge, with a bikeway; conceptual changes during construction; and monumental cost increases caused by such far-flung factors as the upcoming Olympics in China.
