= California's 62nd State Assembly district =

American legislative district

Current assemblymember
Jose Solache; D–Lynwood
- Population (2010) • Voting age • Citizen voting age: 466,713; 355,015; 270,569
- Demographics: 22.84% White; 25.26% Black; 43.23% Latino; 6.50% Asian; 0.34% Native American; 0.55% Hawaiian/Pacific Islander; 0.44% other; 0.85% remainder of multiracial
- Registered voters: 270,490
- Registration: 59.73% Democratic; 11.71% Republican; 24.08% No party preference

California's 62nd State Assembly district is one of 80 California State Assembly districts.

== District profile ==
District map (2012 - 2022)

Prior to the 2022 election, the district encompasses the northern South Bay region and the southern part of the Westside, extending from South Los Angeles to the Pacific Ocean. Heavily urban and ethnically diverse, the district is centered on Los Angeles International Airport.

Los Angeles County – 4.8%

- El Segundo
- Gardena – 25.8%
- Hawthorne
- Inglewood – 99.7%
- Lawndale
- Lennox
- Los Angeles – 3.5%
  - Venice
  - Westchester – partial
- Marina del Rey
- West Athens
- Westmont – partial

== Election results from statewide races ==
Year	Office	Results
2021	Recall	No 81.1 – 18.9%
2020	President	Biden 81.1 – 16.7%
2018	Governor	Newsom 82.3 – 17.7%
2018	Senator	Feinstein 63.0 – 37.0%
2016	President	Clinton 82.1 – 14.1%
2016	Senator	Harris 71.1 – 28.9%
2014	Governor	Brown 77.4 – 22.6%
2012	President	Obama 80.8 – 17.0%
2012	Senator	Feinstein 81.0 – 19.0%

== List of assembly members representing the district ==
Due to redistricting, the 62nd district has been moved around different parts of the state. The current iteration resulted from the 2021 redistricting by the California Citizens Redistricting Commission.

Assembly members	Party	Years served	Counties represented	Notes
William G. Long	Republican	January 5, 1885 – January 3, 1887	Tuolumne	
Edward Smyth	Democratic	January 3, 1887 – January 7, 1889	Tuolumne	
L. R. Tullock	Democratic	January 7, 1889 – January 5, 1891	Tuolumne	
Frank T. Murnan	Democratic	January 5, 1891 – January 2, 1893	Tuolumne	
G. W. Mordecai	Democratic	January 2, 1893 – January 7, 1895	Fresno	
Nathan LaFayette Bachman	Democratic	January 7, 1895 – January 4, 1897	Fresno	
George W. Cartwright	Fusion	January 4, 1897 – January 2, 1899	Fresno	
John M. Griffin	Democratic	January 2, 1899 – January 1, 1901	Fresno	
Wilber Fisk Chandler	Republican	January 1, 1901 – January 5, 1903	Fresno, Madera	
John G. Covert	Democratic	January 5, 1903 – January 2, 1905	Kings	
John F. Pryor	Democratic	January 2, 1905 – January 7, 1907	Kings	
William L. McGuire	Republican	January 7, 1907 – January 4, 1909	Kings	
William John Webber	Democratic	January 4, 1909 – January 2, 1911	Kings	
Frank J. Walker	Republican	January 2, 1911 – January 3, 1912	Kings	Died in office from inflammatory rheumatism.
Vacant		January 3, 1912 – January 6, 1913	Kings	
Freeman H. Bloodgood	Republican	January 6, 1913 – January 4, 1915	Los Angeles	
Charles W. Lyon	Republican	January 4, 1915 – January 6, 1919	Los Angeles	
George R. Wickham	Republican	January 6, 1919 – January 3, 1921	Los Angeles	
Arthur A. Weber	Republican	January 3, 1921 – January 8, 1923	Los Angeles	
Hugh R. Pomeroy	Republican	January 8, 1923 – January 5, 1925	Los Angeles	
Walter J. Little	Republican	January 5, 1925 – January 5, 1931	Los Angeles	
Frederick Madison Roberts	Republican	January 5, 1931 – January 7, 1935	Los Angeles	First African American to be elected to the California State Legislature.
Augustus Hawkins	Democratic	January 7, 1935 – January 3, 1963	Los Angeles	Elected to the 21st congressional district.
Tom Waite	Democratic	January 7, 1963 – January 4, 1965	Los Angeles	
Newton Russell	Republican	January 4, 1965 – November 30, 1974	Los Angeles	
William H. Lancaster	Republican	December 2, 1974 – November 30, 1992	Los Angeles	
William H. Lancaster	Republican	December 2, 1974 – November 30, 1992	Los Angeles, San Bernardino	
Joe Baca	Democratic	December 7, 1992 – November 30, 1998	San Bernardino	
John Longville	Democratic	December 7, 1998 – November 30, 2004	San Bernardino	
Joe Baca Jr.	Democratic	December 6, 2004 – November 30, 2006	San Bernardino	
Wilmer Carter	Democratic	December 4, 2006 – November 30, 2012	San Bernardino	
Steven Bradford	Democratic	December 3, 2012 – November 30, 2014	Los Angeles	
Autumn Burke	Democratic	December 1, 2014 – January 31, 2022	Los Angeles	Resigned before the end of her term.
Vacant		January 31, 2022 – June 20, 2022	Los Angeles	
Tina McKinnor	Democratic	June 20, 2022 – November 30, 2022	Los Angeles	
Anthony Rendon	Democratic	December 5, 2022 – November 30, 2024	Los Angeles	
Jose Solache	Democratic	December 5, 2024 – present	Los Angeles	

== Election results (1990–present) ==
=== 2024 ===
2024 California State Assembly 62nd district election
Primary election
Party	Candidate	Votes	%
Democratic	Jose Solache	19,050	41.4
Republican	Paul Jones	15,798	34.4
Democratic	Maria Estrada	11,117	24.2
Total votes		45,965	100.0
General election
Democratic	Jose Solache	85,383	66.0
Republican	Paul Jones	43,974	34.0
Total votes		129,357	100.0
Democratic hold			

=== 2022 ===
2022 California State Assembly 62nd district election
Primary election
Party	Candidate	Votes	%
Democratic	Anthony Rendon (incumbent)	24,003	67.0
Democratic	Maria Estrada	11,826	33.0
Total votes		35,829	100.0
General election
Democratic	Anthony Rendon (incumbent)	39,442	63.9
Democratic	Maria Estrada	22,285	36.1
Total votes		61,727	100.0
Democratic hold			

=== 2022 (special) ===
2022 California State Assembly 62nd district special election Vacancy resulting from the resignation of Autumn Burke
Primary election
Party	Candidate	Votes	%
Democratic	Robert Pullen-Miles	11,213	39.0
Democratic	Tina McKinnor	9,945	34.6
Democratic	Angie Reyes English	3,794	13.2
Democratic	Nico Ruderman	3,777	13.1
Total votes		28,729	100.0
General election
Democratic	Tina McKinnor	31,348	52.5
Democratic	Robert Pullen-Miles	28,359	47.5
Total votes		59,707	100.0
Democratic hold			

=== 2020 ===
2020 California State Assembly 62nd district election
Primary election
Party	Candidate	Votes	%
Democratic	Autumn Burke (incumbent)	82,532	84.4
Republican	Robert A. Steele	15,273	15.6
Total votes		97,805	100.0
General election
Democratic	Autumn Burke (incumbent)	158,832	80.9
Republican	Robert A. Steele	37,500	19.1
Total votes		196,332	100.0
Democratic hold			

=== 2018 ===
2018 California State Assembly 62nd district election
Primary election
Party	Candidate	Votes	%
Democratic	Autumn Burke (incumbent)	53,479	80.8
Republican	Al L. Hernandez	12,668	19.2
Total votes		66,147	100.0
General election
Democratic	Autumn Burke (incumbent)	123,132	82.9
Republican	Al L. Hernandez	25,356	17.1
Total votes		148,488	100.0
Democratic hold			

=== 2016 ===
2016 California State Assembly 62nd district election
Primary election
Party	Candidate	Votes	%
Democratic	Autumn Burke (incumbent)	67,691	99.9
Libertarian	Baron Bruno (write-in)	32	0.0
Republican	Marco Antonio "Tony" Leal (write-in)	32	0.0
Total votes		67,755	100.0
General election
Democratic	Autumn Burke (incumbent)	123,699	77.2
Republican	Marco Antonio "Tony" Leal	27,628	17.2
Libertarian	Baron Bruno	8,958	5.6
Total votes		160,285	100.0
Democratic hold			

=== 2014 ===
2014 California State Assembly 62nd district election
Primary election
Party	Candidate	Votes	%
Democratic	Autumn Burke	14,933	40.9
Republican	Ted J. Grose	7,357	20.1
Democratic	Gloria Gray	6,048	16.5
Democratic	Simona A. Farrise	4,624	12.7
Democratic	Paul Kouri	1,091	3.0
Democratic	Mike Stevens	939	2.6
No party preference	Emidio "Mimi" Soltysik	922	2.5
Democratic	Adam M. Plimpton	635	1.7
Total votes		36,549	100.0
General election
Democratic	Autumn Burke	54,304	75.9
Republican	Ted J. Grose	17,261	24.1
Total votes		71,565	100.0
Democratic hold			

=== 2012 ===
2012 California State Assembly 62nd district election
Primary election
Party	Candidate	Votes	%
Democratic	Steven Bradford (incumbent)	25,446	75.3
Democratic	Mervin Evans	8,338	24.7
Total votes		33,784	100.0
General election
Democratic	Steven Bradford (incumbent)	98,047	72.1
Democratic	Mervin Evans	37,957	27.9
Total votes		136,004	100.0
Democratic hold			

=== 2010 ===
2010 California State Assembly 62nd district election
Party	Candidate	Votes	%
Democratic	Wilmer Carter (incumbent)	44,606	69.8
Republican	Jeane Ensley	19,319	30.2
Total votes		63,925	100.0
Democratic hold			

=== 2008 ===
2008 California State Assembly 62nd district election
Party	Candidate	Votes	%
Democratic	Wilmer Carter (incumbent)	78,003	100.0
Total votes		78,003	100.0
Democratic hold			

=== 2006 ===
2006 California State Assembly 62nd district election
Party	Candidate	Votes	%
Democratic	Wilmer Carter	33,747	68.2
Republican	Marge Mendoza-Ware	15,704	31.8
Total votes		49,451	100.0
Democratic hold			

=== 2004 ===
2004 California State Assembly 62nd district election
Party	Candidate	Votes	%
Democratic	Joe Baca, Jr.	51,407	64.6
Republican	Marge Mendoza-Ware	28,210	35.4
Total votes		79,617	100.0
Democratic hold			

=== 2002 ===
2002 California State Assembly 62nd district election
Party	Candidate	Votes	%
Democratic	John Longville (incumbent)	28,744	69.3
Republican	G. Edward Scott	12,761	30.7
Total votes		41,505	100.0
Democratic hold			

=== 2000 ===
2000 California State Assembly 62nd district election
Party	Candidate	Votes	%
Democratic	John Longville (incumbent)	47,198	63.4
Republican	Mary Lou Martinez	24,628	33.1
Libertarian	Henry John Matus	2,651	3.6
Total votes		74,477	100.0
Democratic hold			

=== 1998 ===
1998 California State Assembly 62nd district election
Party	Candidate	Votes	%
Democratic	John Longville	36,365	64.6
Republican	Irma Escobar	19,956	35.4
Total votes		56,321	100.0
Democratic hold			

=== 1996 ===
1996 California State Assembly 62nd district election
Party	Candidate	Votes	%
Democratic	Joe Baca (incumbent)	47,064	64.3
Republican	Glenn Elsemann	26,148	35.7
Total votes		73,212	100.0
Democratic hold			

=== 1994 ===
1994 California State Assembly 62nd district election
Party	Candidate	Votes	%
Democratic	Joe Baca (incumbent)	36,127	59.6
Republican	Tom Hibbard	24,486	40.4
Total votes		60,613	100.0
Democratic hold			

=== 1992 ===
1992 California State Assembly 62nd district election
Party	Candidate	Votes	%
Democratic	Joe Baca	51,372	58.6
Republican	Steve Hall	30,750	35.1
Libertarian	Ethel M. Haas	5,496	6.3
Total votes		87,618	100.0
Democratic gain from Republican			

=== 1990 ===
1990 California State Assembly 62nd district election
Party	Candidate	Votes	%
Republican	William H. Lancaster (incumbent)	55,469	64.1
Democratic	Selma D. Calnan	31,060	35.9
Total votes		86,529	100.0
Republican hold			

== See also ==
- California State Assembly
- California State Assembly districts
- Districts in California
