= Jose Solache =

American politician

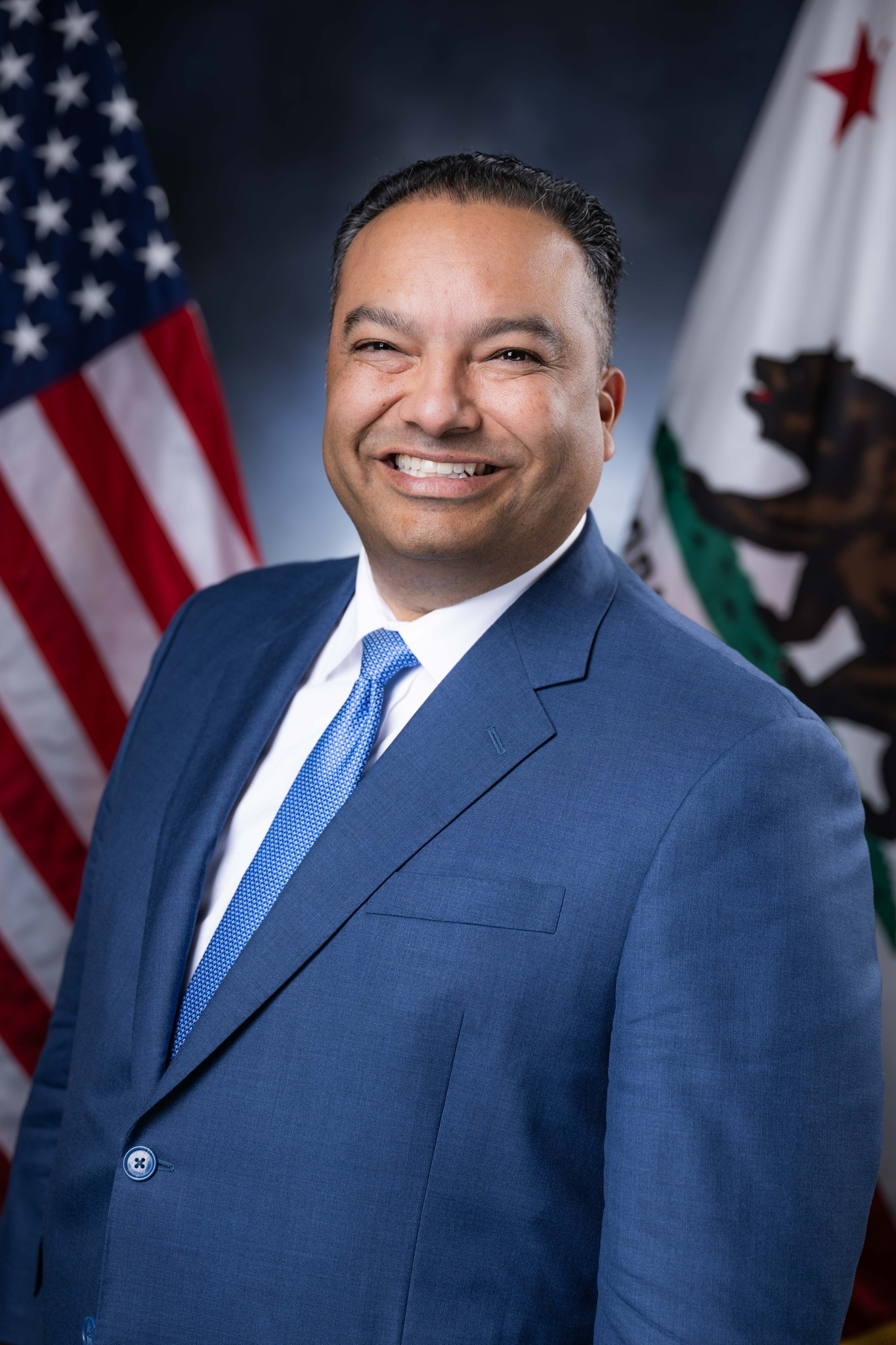
- Official portrait, 2024

Member of the California State Assembly from the 62nd district
- Incumbent
- Assumed office December 2, 2024
- Preceded by: Anthony Rendon

Personal details
- Born: José Luis Solache; 1980 (age 45–46) Bellflower, California, U.S.
- Party: Democratic
- Education: California State University, Dominguez Hills (BA); University of Southern California

José Luis Solache (born 1980) is an American politician who is serving a member of the California State Assembly since 2024, representing the 62nd district. A member of the Democratic Party, his district covers parts of the Gateway Cities in southeastern Los Angeles County, including the cities of Lynwood, Bellflower, Lakewood, and Paramount, as well as the more central cities of Huntington Park, Maywood, and South Gate. Prior to being elected to the assembly, he served as a member of the Lynwood City Council from 2013 to 2024, serving intermittently as its mayor.

== Early life and education ==
Jose Solache was born in Bellflower, California, and grew up in nearby Lynwood, attending local public schools. While attending Lynwood High School he played clarinet in the band. He attended California State University, Dominguez Hills, earning a bachelor's degree in liberal studies. While in college, he served two terms as student body president and as the statewide chairman of the California State Student Association. He is currently pursuing a master's degree at the University of Southern California.

== Early career ==
Solache was first elected to public office in 2003, when he became the youngest Latino member of the Lynwood School Board at the age of 23. After serving two terms on the board, he was elected to the Lynwood City Council in 2013. As Lynwood operated under a council–manager government, members of the city council are ceremoniously selected as mayor for one-year terms, of which Solache served multiple before retiring to run for state assembly.

Solache ran for California State Senate in the 33rd district in 2019, placing 5th in the special election to replace Ricardo Lara.

== California State Assembly ==
Solache announced his candidacy for the 62nd district in April 2023. He ran with the endorsement of then-speaker of the assembly Anthony Rendon, who was term-limited out of his seat. Positions raised during his campaign included lowering college tuition, investing in after school programs, and increasing public safety. Solache defeated Republican Paul Jones in the November 2024 general election with 66.0% of the vote.

In 2025, Solache voted against SB 79, bipartisan legislation to increase housing supply in California amid a housing shortage. The legislation, which passed, permitted dense housing near major public transit stations.

== Electoral history ==
=== California State Senate ===
2019 California State Senate 33rd district special primary election Vacancy resulting from the resignation of Ricardo Lara
Primary election
Party	Candidate	Votes	%
Democratic	Lena Gonzalez	10,984	31.6
Republican	Jack M. Guerrero	4,860	14.0
Democratic	Ali Saleh	3,334	9.6
Democratic	Ana Maria Quintana	3,038	8.8
Democratic	Jose Solache	2,594	7.5
Democratic	Denise Diaz	2,404	6.9
Republican	Martha Flores Gibson	2,225	6.4
Democratic	Leticia Vasquez Wilson	1,839	5.3
Democratic	Al Austin, II	1,356	3.9
Democratic	Thomas Jefferson Cares	824	2.4
Democratic	Chris Garcia	720	2.1
Green	Cesar Flores	529	1.5
Total votes		34,711	100.0

=== California State Assembly ===
2024 California State Assembly 62nd district election
Primary election
Party	Candidate	Votes	%
Democratic	Jose Solache	19,050	41.4
Republican	Paul Jones	15,798	34.4
Democratic	Maria Estrada	11,117	24.2
Total votes		45,965	100.0
General election
Democratic	Jose Solache	85,383	66.0
Republican	Paul Jones	43,974	34.0
Total votes		129,357	100.0
Democratic hold			

== Personal life ==
Solache is openly gay.
