= Steven Bradford =

American politician

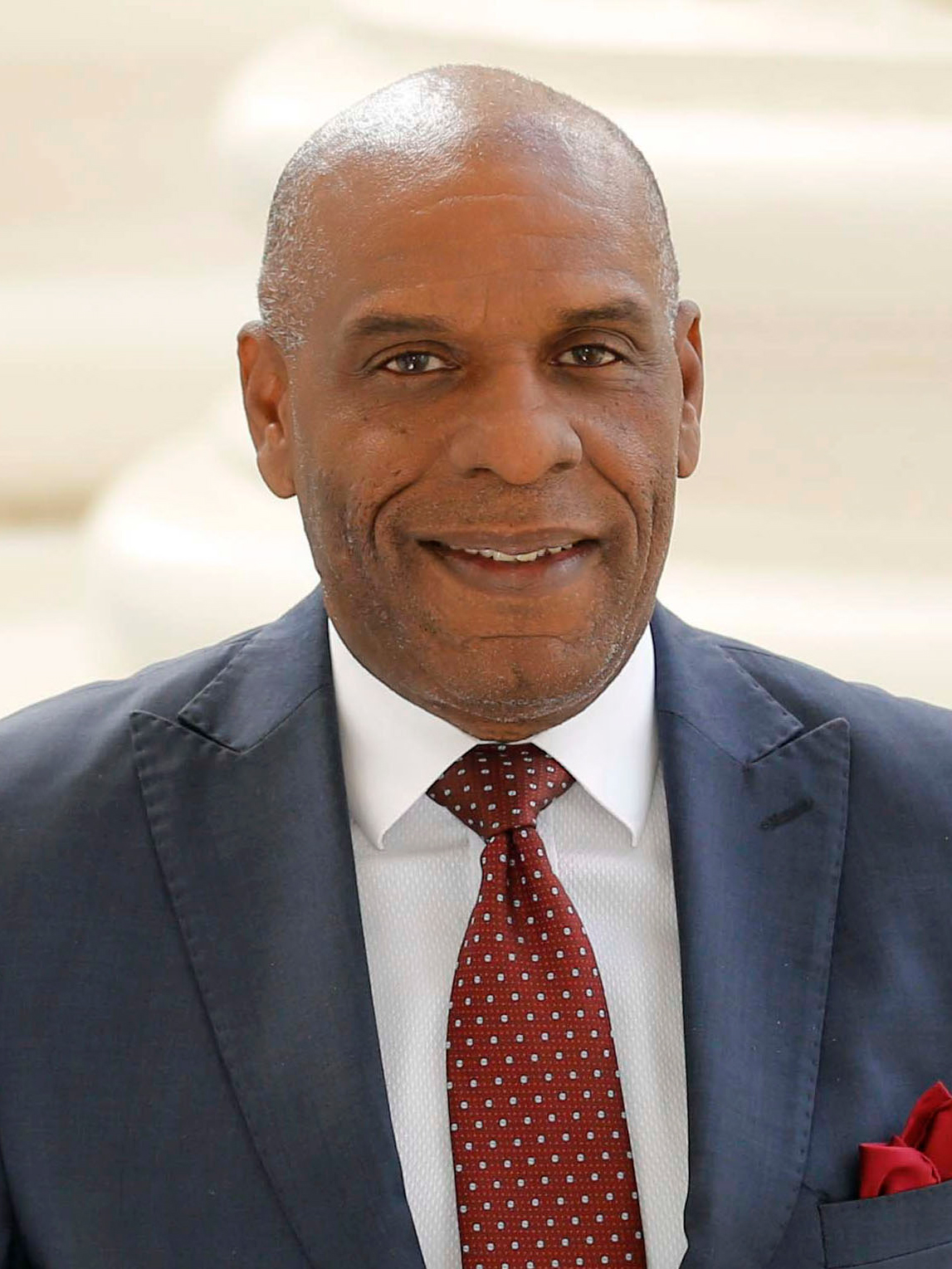
- Official portrait, 2016

Member of the California State Senate from the 35th district
- In office December 5, 2016 – November 30, 2024
- Preceded by: Isadore Hall III
- Succeeded by: Laura Richardson

Member of the California State Assembly
- In office September 10, 2009 – November 30, 2014
- Preceded by: Curren Price
- Succeeded by: Autumn Burke
- Constituency: 51st district (2009–2012); 62nd district (2012–2014)

Personal details
- Born: Steven Craig Bradford; January 12, 1960 (age 66) Gardena, California, U.S.
- Party: Democratic
- Education: San Diego State University; California State University, Dominguez Hills (BA)

Steven Craig Bradford (born January 12, 1960) is an American politician who served in the California State Senate from 2016 to 2024. A member of the Democratic Party, he represented the 35th district, encompassing parts of Los Angeles County. Prior to his election to the state senate, he was an assemblymember for the 62nd district of the California State Assembly. Bradford was elected to represent the 51st district in a special election held on September 1, 2009, after Curren Price resigned his seat to take a seat in the California State Senate. He was re-elected in 2010 and, with 72% of the vote, was elected once more to represent the brand new 62nd District, comprising the communities of Del Aire, Del Rey, El Segundo, Gardena, Hawthorne, Inglewood, Lawndale, Lennox, Marina del Rey, West Athens, Westchester, Westmont and Venice Beach.

Before his election to the assembly, Bradford served on the Gardena City Council. He was a candidate for California Insurance Commissioner in the 2026 election.

== Early life and career ==
Bradford moved to Gardena with his family at age nine. He attended Purche Avenue Elementary School, Henry Clay Junior High School and Gardena High School. Following high school, he attended San Diego State University and California State University, Dominguez Hills, where he earned a bachelor's degree in political science and certificate in paralegal studies.

Bradford was the first African American elected to the Gardena City Council, a post he held for over 12 years. He served one year as Mayor Pro Tem of the city.

He also worked twelve years as a public affairs executive at Southern California Edison, seven years at IBM, and four years as a program director at the Los Angeles Conservation Corps.

== Assembly career ==
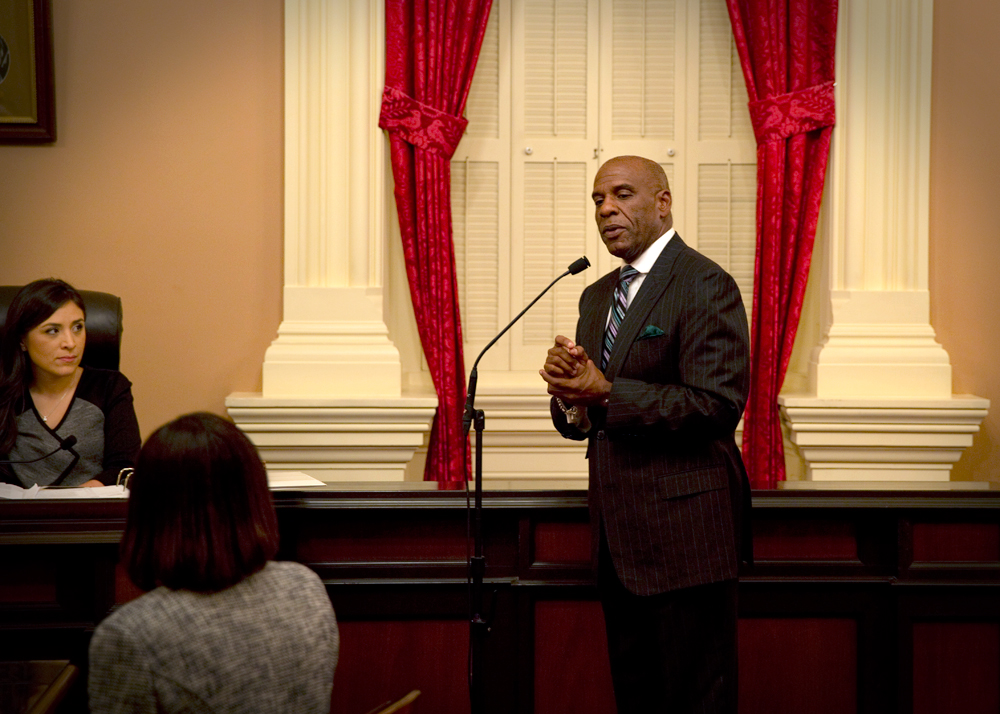
Bradford addresses the Senate Rules Committee in support of California Energy Commission Commissioner Janea A. Scott.

Bradford's time in the assembly has been marked by his chairmanship of the Assembly Committee on Utilities and Commerce, which has legislative jurisdiction over electricity, natural gas, telecommunications, private water corporations and other issues related to commerce. Actions taken in this committee affect California homeowners and businesses, the economy, jobs, and the environment.

In his role as chair, Bradford has garnered national attention presiding over important hearings investigating major power outages, and how federal, state, and local authorities might better respond to such events and prevent them from happening in the future. In October 2011, Bradford convened a joint legislative hearing with Assemblymember Bonnie Lowenthal, chair of the Joint Legislative Committee on Emergency Management, in San Diego to discuss the massive power outage that struck the Pacific Southwest region in September of that year.

In February 2012 Bradford and Lowenthal convened another hearing in Alhambra to investigate another major power outage that struck the Los Angeles area as a result of a massive windstorm.

Early in 2013, Assembly Speaker John A. Perez named Bradford the Chair of the Assembly Select Committee on the Status of Boys and Men of Color. The Select Committee is a bipartisan panel of legislators from around the state tasked with fact finding and making recommendations for addressing the issues facing young men in California, particularly black and Latino boys.

In February Bradford accepted an invitation to the White House to attend President Barack Obama's announcement of "My Brother's Keeper," a federal investment in the lives of boys and men of color. The program follows the work Bradford's Select Committee on the Status of Boys and Men of Color has done to give young men of color the tools they need to succeed, while dismantling systemic injustices that stand in the way of their success.

== Legislation ==
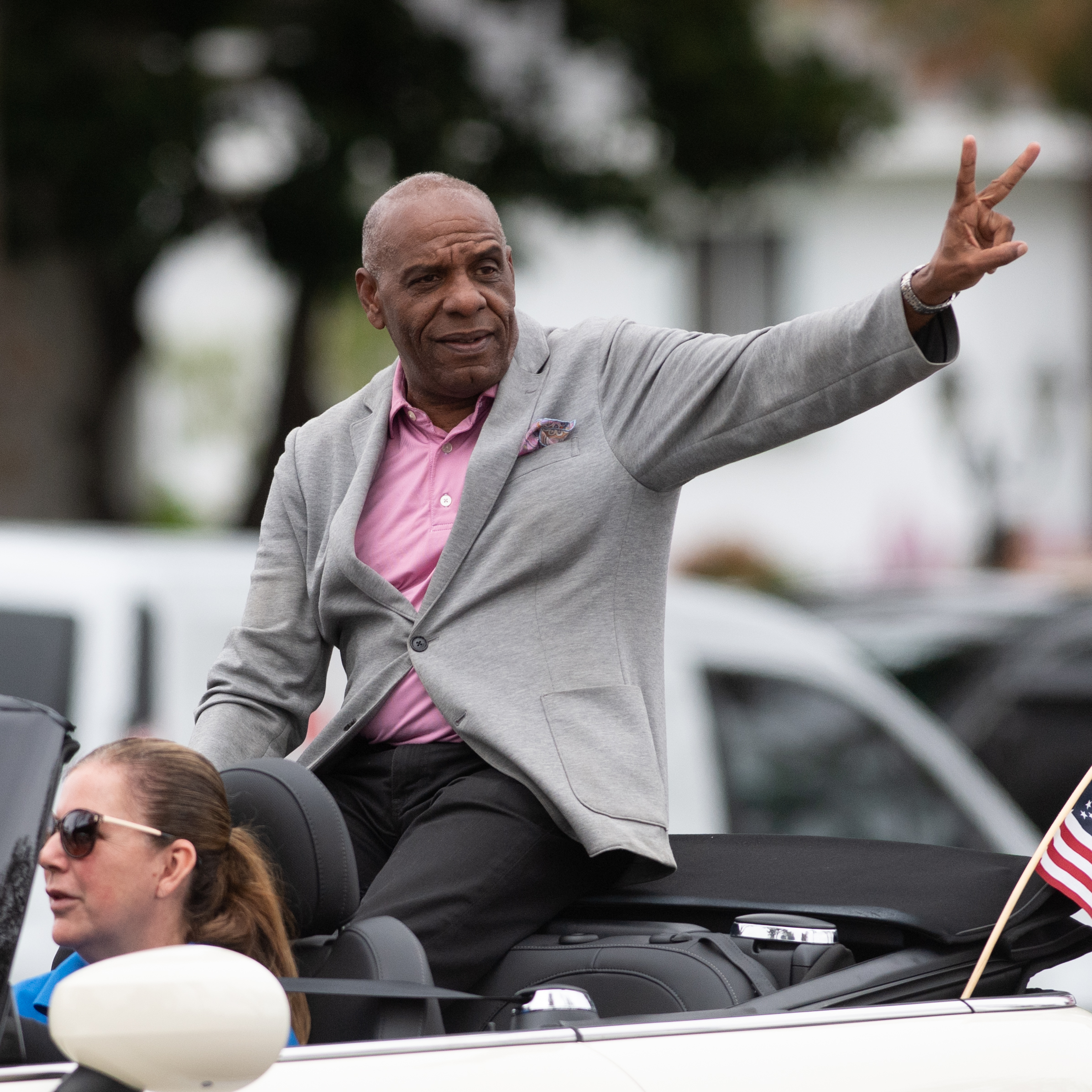
Bradford in 2023.

In addition to his management of the Assembly Committee on Utilities and Commerce, Bradford has also authored several pieces of legislation on energy and utilities.

In 2012 Governor Jerry Brown signed into law AB 1511, which requires property sellers to inform buyers of important information about natural gas pipelines near their homes. The law was authored in response to the deadly explosion of an underground pipeline in San Bruno, California.

Bradford also authored AB 2201, which increases civil penalties on pipeline operators for safety violations. Bradford's bill brings the cap on penalties under California law into line with those under federal law: $200,000 per day, and a maximum of $2,000,000.

Bradford drew national attention for AB 2514, a bill requiring the California Public Utilities Commission to conduct a study examining the costs and benefits of California's net-energy metering (NEM) program. While NEM programs have helped develop solar power industries in countries around the world, Bradford believes they may shift costs unfairly onto homes without solar panels.

Bradford closed the 2013 legislative year having 11 bills signed into law by Governor Edmund G. Brown, Jr. Among these were bills focused on public safety, solar energy, and criminal justice reform:

- AB 128: Following a recommendation made by the California Commission on Peace Officer Standards and Training (POST), AB 128 reclassifies the Los Angeles World Airports police department under Penal Code 830.1. Officers with 830.1 status are considered full peace officers, equivalent to municipal police departments. Without 830.1 status, airport officers are prohibited from removing vehicles, seizing drugs or weapons, or other functions for which they may need to wait for backup to arrive. Bradford, whose district includes Los Angeles International Airport, introduced the bill ten years after the POST recommendation. Earlier versions of the bill died in the legislature.
- AB 170: For purposes of obtaining an assault weapons permit, under current law a "person" is defined as an "individual, partnership, corporation, limited liability company, association, or any other group or entity." AB 170 limits the definition of a person to an individual.
- AB 217: Extends existing financial support for solar installations on low-income households. The California Solar Initiative (CSI) directs 10 percent of its funding to solar subsidies for low and very-low income households. AB 217 extends this component for another six years after the CSI sunsets.
- AB 651: Gives judges more discretion to grant an expungement of a low-level offense when the offender has completed supervision, paid restitution, and demonstrated a commitment to reentry.
- AB 721: Clarifies the existing drug trafficking statute, which allows prosecutors to add a felony transportation charge to a person found physically moving any amount of illegal drugs. AB 721 adds the words "with the intent to sell" to clarify the Legislature's intent to punish drug dealers. An individual may still be eligible for a drug possession charge, but prosecutors will now have to show an individual had the intent to sell in order to qualify for an additional trafficking charge.
- AB 1371: The Three Feet for Safety Act establishes a minimum three-foot buffer around bicyclists on public roads in California. Motorists wishing to pass a cyclist must keep a distance of at least three feet, or slow to a safe and prudent speed if there is not enough room to give three feet. Bradford's version of the bill was the fifth attempt at a safe passing distance in California. Earlier versions died in the Legislature twice, and were twice vetoed by the Governor. The safe passing distance took effect September 16, 2014.

By the close of the 2014 legislative year, Bradford had sent 15 bills to the governor's desk. As of September 21, he had already signed AB 2634, which gives courts "greater authority to issue injunctions against police departments that have a history of civil rights violations." Still awaiting gubernatorial action are bills including:

- AB 2673: Sponsored by City Attorney Mike Feuer and endorsed by the Los Angeles Times, this bill eliminates "the use of civil compromise in misdemeanor hit-and-run collisions that result in injury or death." Under current law, a hit-and-run driver may reach a civil compromise—usually a financial settlement—and have criminal charges dropped. This bill ensures that hit-and-run drivers face criminal responsibility for their actions.
- AB 1327: Jointly authored with Assembly Members Jeff Gorell and Bill Quirk, this bill establishes regulations for public agencies wishing to deploy unmanned aerial vehicles. Among those, agencies would need a warrant and to give public notice before deploying a drone; would be required to destroy any data and images collected from a drone within one year, unless part of an ongoing investigation; and would be expressly prohibited from arming a drone with weapons. This bill has been endorsed by Los Angeles Mayor Eric Garcetti and the San Jose Mercury News.

== 2026 Insurance Commissioner election ==
On April 15, 2024, Bradford announced he would run for lieutenant governor of California for the 2026 election. The field of candidates included numerous other elected officials, leading Bradford to switch his campaign to the concurrent election for California Insurance Commissioner on May 29, 2025. He and Fiona Ma mutually endorsed each other in their respective primary elections. He ultimately secured 4% of the total votes polled and failed to advance to the general election.

== Electoral history ==
Steven Bradford was elected in a 2009 special election, following the resignation of Curren Price, who had recently won election to the California State Senate. He was elected to his first outright term in 2010.

Following the 2010 Census, California's legislative districts were redrawn. Bradford ran for the newly drawn 62nd district, which maintained many of the cities from the previous 51st district. Bradford was endorsed for election to the 62nd Assembly district by the local newspaper of the South Bay, the Daily Breeze.

Portions of his electoral results are shown below.

Year	Result
2009	52.89%
2010	81.7%
2012	72.1%
2026	4.91%
