= Larry Egger =

Profile
- Position: Quarterback

Personal information
- Born: c. 1965; Redondo Beach, California, U.S.

Career information
- College: El Camino College (1984): Utah (1985–1986)

Larry Egger (born c. 1965) is a former American football quarterback. He played college football at El Camino College in 1984 and for the Utah Utes in 1985 and 1986. He ranked among the leading quarterbacks in major-college football with 2,988 passing yards in 1985 (5th), 2,761 passing yards in 1986 (7th), and 21 passing touchdowns in 1986 (2nd).
