= Hermosa, Colorado =

Unincorporated community in La Plata County, CO, USA

Hermosa
- Unincorporated community
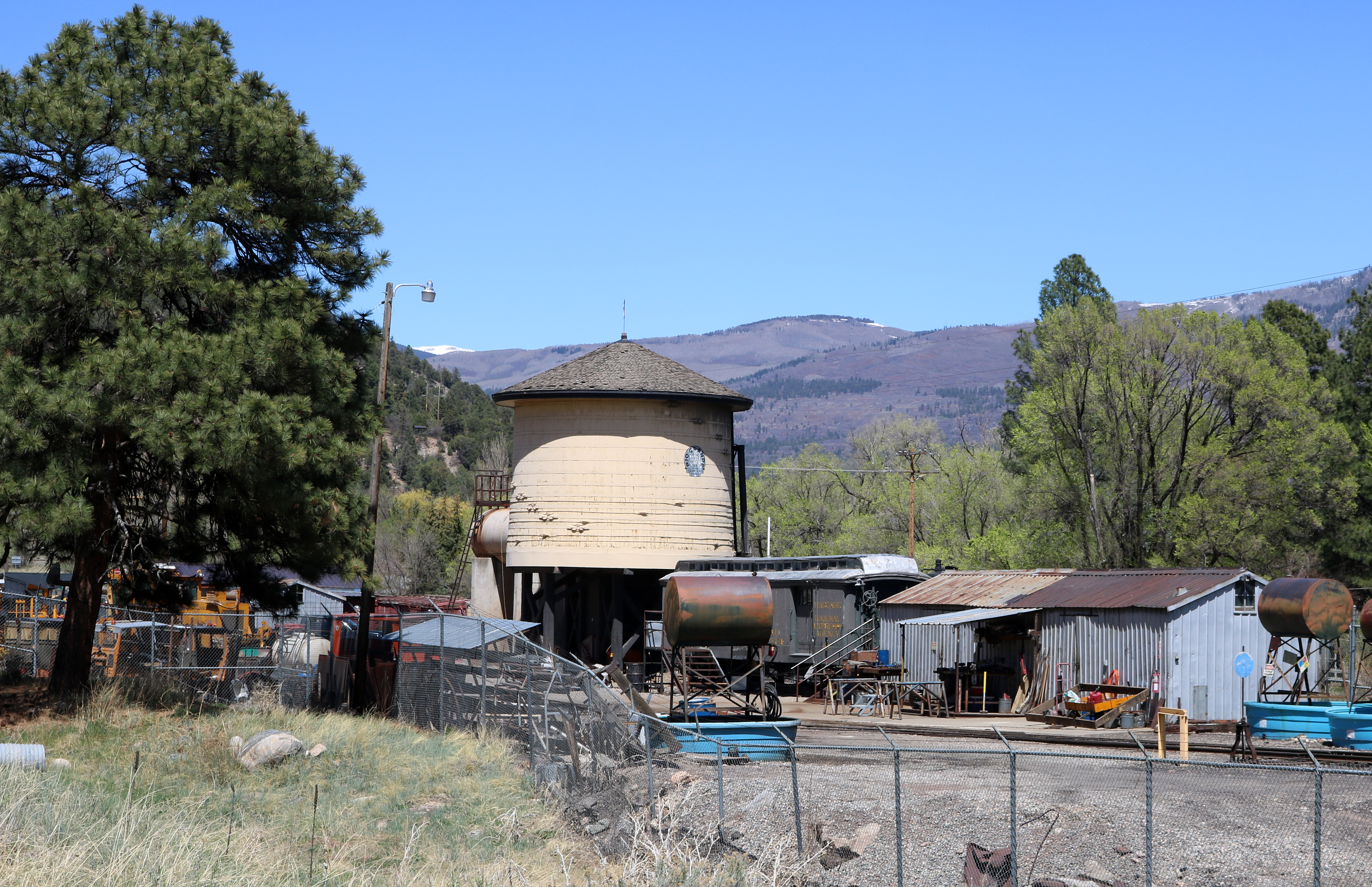
- The D&SNG water tank along U.S. Route 550 in Hermosa, April 2020
- Etymology: From the Spanish word hermosa, meaning beautiful
- Location within the state of Colorado
- Coordinates: 37°24′55″N 107°50′07″W
- Country: United States
- State: Colorado
- County: La Plata County
- <-- Settled -->: c. 1874
- Elevation: 6,644 ft (2,025 m)
- Time zone: UTC-7 (MST)
  - Summer (DST): UTC-6 (MDT)
- ZIP code: 81301
- Area code: 970
- GNIS feature ID: 183933

Hermosa is an unincorporated community in La Plata County, Colorado, United States. It is located north of Durango along U.S. Highway 550.

== History ==
The community was established around 1874 and had a post office from 1876 to 1900. Residents are now served by post offices in Durango.

In 2018, the 416 Fire burned northwest of Hermosa, prompting evacuations.

== Attractions ==
The Durango and Silverton Narrow Gauge Railroad has a water stop in Hermosa, and the railroad maintains a maintenance yard and a siding there, which is sometimes called the Hermosa Depot. The yard has a prominent railroad water tank that is easily seen by motorists passing through Hermosa on Highway 550.

Hermosa Creek passes through the community from west to east and has its confluence with the Animas River nearby.

The Hermosa Cliffs, formed of red sandstone, line the river valley in Hermosa.

== See also ==
- Durango Micropolitan Statistical Area
