= 416 Fire =

2018 wildfires in Colorado, United States

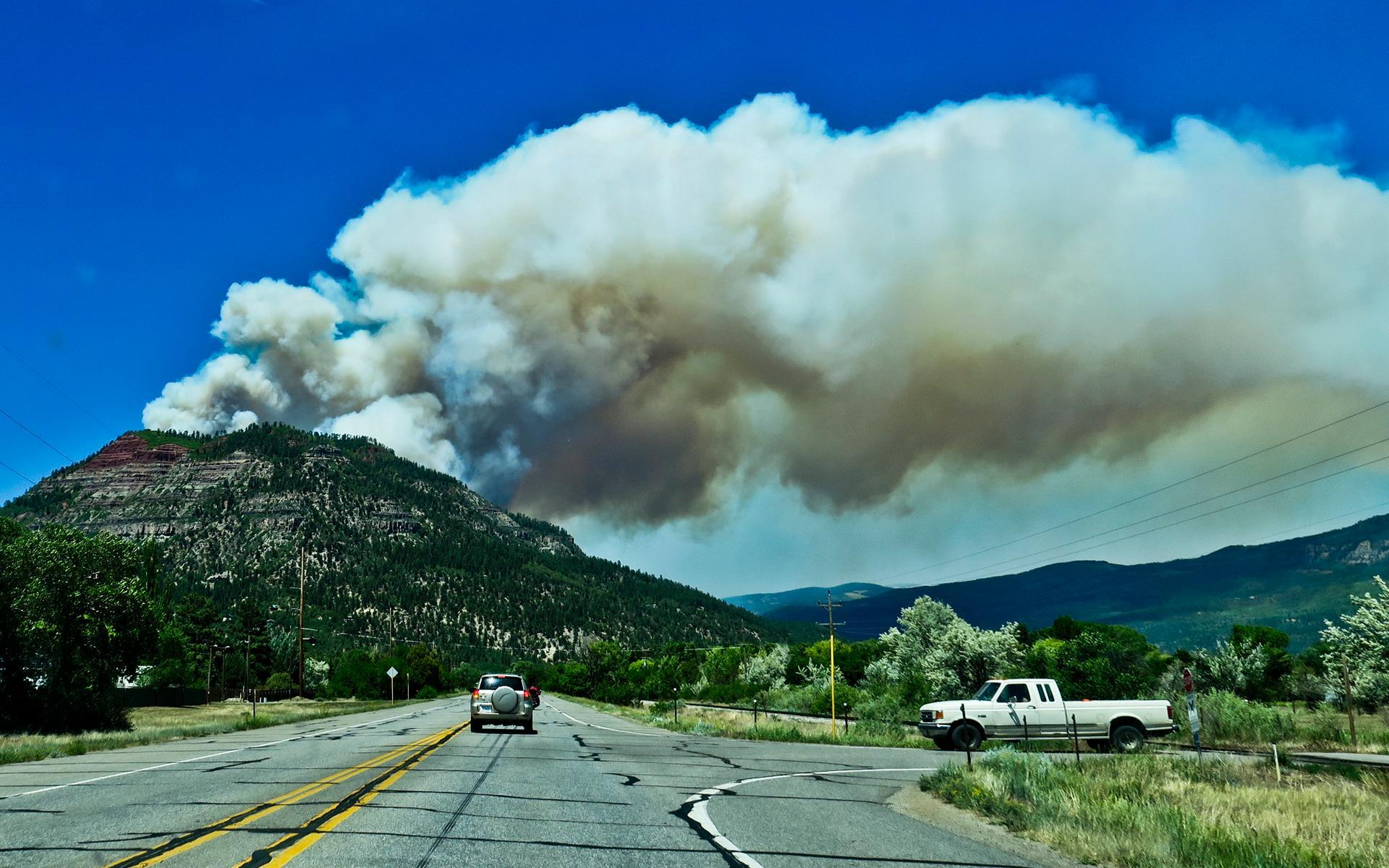
- 416 Fire on June 1, 2018
- Date: June 1, 2018 – July 31, 2018
- Location: San Juan National Forest, Colorado, United States
- Coordinates: 37.461°N 107.808°W

Statistics
- Burned area: 55,000 acres (22,258 ha)

Impacts
- Deaths: 0
- Structures destroyed: 0
- Cost: $40,000,000

Ignition
- Cause: Embers emitted from a coal-powered steam locomotive

Map
- Location of fire in Colorado.

The 416 and Burro Fire Complex were two wildfires that burned in the southwestern portion of Colorado in the United States in 2018. The fires burned predominantly within San Juan National Forest, 13 miles (21 kilometres) north of Durango and 14 miles (23 kilometres) south of Rico. The 416 Fire started on June 1, 2018, and the Burro Fire followed on June 8. Federal officials allege that embers emitted from a coal-burning steam locomotive used by the historic Durango and Silverton Narrow Gauge Railroad started the blaze, and have filed a lawsuit against the railroad seeking recoupment of $25 million in firefighting costs, penalties and legal expenses. The fires burned a combined total of over 57,000 acres (23,067 ha) and have cost more than $43 million to contain. On March 31, 2022, the Durango and Silverton Narrow Gauge Railroad reached settlements in two lawsuits stemming from its role in starting the 416 fire: one settlement with federal authorities in which the railroad would pay $20 million to the federal government and institute a fire mitigation program for its operations. In the second settlement, the railroad agreed to pay an undisclosed amount to home and business owners impacted by the fire and subsequent floods during the summer monsoon season that followed in the wake of the 416 fire.

The 416 Fire was one of the largest wildfires in Colorado's history, and both fires had major impacts on tourism and commerce for communities in the southwest portion of the state.

== Events ==
=== June ===
The 416 Fire started around 10:00 a.m. on June 1, 2018, approximately 10 miles (16 kilometres) north of Durango, Colorado and west of Highway 550, adjacent to the tracks for the historic Durango and Silverton Narrow Gauge Railroad. By the morning of June 2, the fire had expanded into the San Juan National Forest and had burned an estimated 1,100 acres (445 ha). The highway was closed between milemarkers 34 and 48 for public safety and to allow firefighters to keep the fire from crossing the highway. County Road 250 was also closed. Evacuation orders were put in place for residents of Baker's Bridge at County Road 250 north to Electra Lake Road, where 825 structures are threatened.

By the evening of June 3, the fire had grown to 2,255 acres (913 ha) and was 10 percent contained. It expanded to Hermosa Creek, prompting officials to issue pre-evacuation orders to the community of Hermosa. The next day, the fire showed significant activity due to winds. Highway 550 was again closed due to heavy smoke and fire teams focused on building defensible spaces around buildings and using controlled burns as needed. The fire is at 10 percent containment.

By June 5, new pre-evacuation orders were put in place for areas east of Hermosa due to southerly winds keeping the flames on the ridgeline on the slopes near the community. Temperatures were hotter than average and Forest Service personnel cited increased drought conditions as creating additional challenges. Crews continued to fight the fire using aerial support.

The Burro Fire began on the opposite side of the Hermosa Creek Wilderness Area on June 8. As of July 2, 2018 the fire had spread to within 10 miles (16 kilometres) of the 416 fire and burned over 4,000 acres (1,619 ha).

By June 29, the 416 fire had expanded to 41,617 acres (16,842 ha) and was 37 percent contained. The fire continued moving north, with crews clearing and chipping brush piles along the Durango and Silverton Narrow Gauge Railroad. Burnouts continued in the southwest in No Buck Creek.

=== July ===
By July 1, the fire had grown to 49,301 acres (19,951 ha) and was 37 percent contained. Temperatures enabled crews to focus on containment in the south and southwestern side of the fire, while northwest winds caused smokey conditions for communities along Highway 550, including Durango and Hermosa Creek. Concerns about the fire impacting the Purgatory Resort were reduced, however hotshot crews remained in the area to protect the resort, if needed.

The 416 Fire was declared fully contained on July 31, 2018, after burning 52,778 acres (21,358 ha) acres over 61 days. The Burro Fire was contained a day later, on Aug. 1, 2018.

== Impact ==
Over 1300 homes and businesses were forced to evacuate due to the fire. No structures were destroyed by the fire though businesses suffered economic losses due to closures and the impact on tourism. Homes and businesses were damaged later when heavy rains triggered floods in the burn areas.

The fire forced the closure of Purgatory Ski Resort, Durango and Silverton Narrow Gauge Railroad, and the San Juan National Forest, as well as sporadic closures of Highway 550. The town of Silverton had to cancel their famed 4 July Fireworks, which brings thousands of visitors to the tiny mountain town. Railroad tourism regained operation in July with diesel locomotives and steam engine services to Silverton resume on July 17. Purgatory resumed its summer operations on July 2

The July 4th cancellations and highway, rail, and trail closures have devastated the tourism industry of Silverton, and has had a substantial impact on the economies of Durango and elsewhere in southwest Colorado.

The Durango and Silverton Narrow Gauge Railroad has since converted most or all of its operating steam locomotives from burning coal to burning oil.

== See also ==
- Spring Creek Fire (2018)
- Lake Christine Fire
- Weston Pass Fire
