= Variable density goggles =

Variable density goggles were used by U.S. aerial gunners and anti-aircraft gunners in World War II. They were equipped with a turning dial on the front allowing the pilot to alter the tint of the lens enabling them to see tracer rounds and not be easily blinded. They failed to gain popularity in the military, however, and were phased out soon after the Second World War. They were more accepted by AAA gunners than aircrew, as it was one more piece of equipment that the aircrews would have to carry onto an airplane.
