= Hermosa Creek =

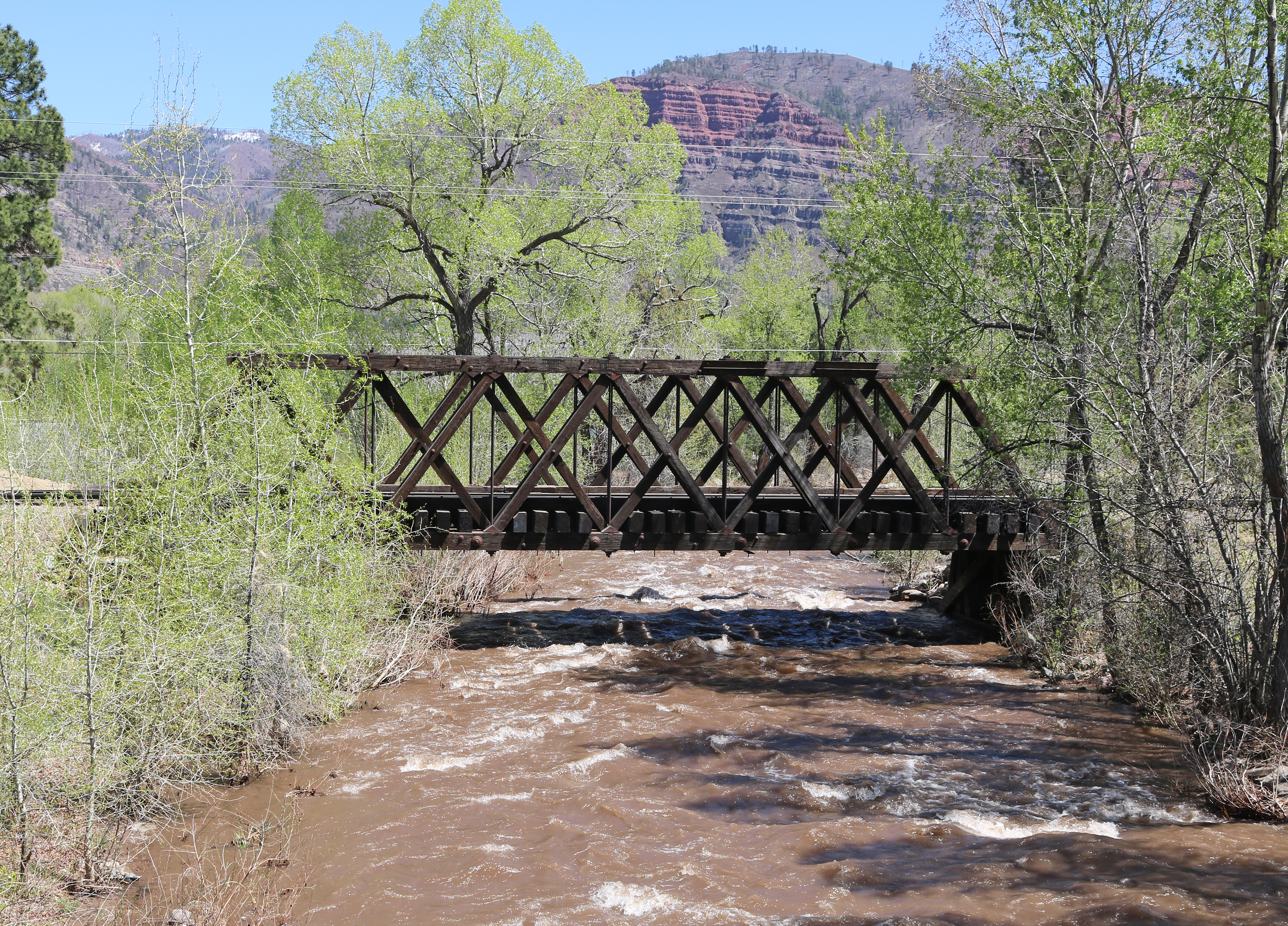
- The creek in Hermosa, Colorado

- Map showing the location of the river mouth in Colorado

Location
- Country: United States
- State: Colorado
- Counties: San Juan and La Plata

Physical characteristics
- Source
  - location: San Juan National Forest
  - coordinates: 37°42′52.99″N 107°53′7.24″W
- Mouth
  - location: Hermosa, Colorado
  - coordinates: 37°24′4″N 107°49′49.24″W
  - elevation: 6,585 feet (2,007 meters)

Basin features
- Progression: Animas – San Juan – Colorado
- River system: Colorado River

Hermosa Creek is a tributary of the Animas River in San Juan and La Plata counties in Colorado. The creek rises near Hermosa Peak in San Juan County, Colorado and then flows generally south to La Plata County and to its confluence with the Animas River in Hermosa.

== Protected areas ==
Most of the creek lies in the San Juan National Forest. In 2014, Congress passed and the president signed the Hermosa Creek Watershed Protection Act. The legislation created the Hermosa Creek Special Management Area and the adjacent Hermosa Creek Wilderness. Much of the creek and its watershed lies within these two federally-protected areas. Part of the natural area is old-growth forest and recognized by the Old-Growth Forest Network.

== Effect of the 416 Fire ==
In 2018, the 416 Fire burned thousands of acres of the Hermosa Creek watershed. Long known for its pristine and clear waters, the creek has been severely affected by the erosion occurring as a result of the fire.

== See also ==
- List of rivers of Colorado
