= Sacred Ridge =

Archaeological site in Colorado associated with early Pueblo I period violence

Coordinates: 37.2253°N 107.9339°W

Sacred Ridge was a significant multi-habitation archaeological site located about 8 miles (13 km) southwest of Durango, Colorado. Associated with the early Ancestral Pueblo (Anasazi) culture, the site dates from approximately 700 CE to 803 CE and contained at least 22 pit structures. It is considered one of the most important Pueblo I period sites in the northern Southwest due to evidence of large-scale violence and social upheaval. Excavations uncovered the remains of at least 30–35 individuals exhibiting perimortem trauma, dismemberment, and extensive processing, representing one of the largest and earliest known deposits of mutilated human remains in the region. Scholars have interpreted the event as a possible case of organized warfare or ethnic conflict, culminating in the destruction and abandonment of the settlement by around 810 CE. The site is now submerged beneath Lake Nighthorse.

== Site work ==
Site work was done between 2002 and 2005 by SWCA Environmental Consultants, which were retained by the Ute Mountain Ute Tribe to do the required archaeological and cultural investigations. Most of the sites covered by this investigation were in the Ridges Basin, which was to be inundated by Lake Nighthorse once the Ridges Basin Dam was complete, but some of the sites covered in this investigation were on Blue Mesa, which was used as borrow area for dam fill. Results of this study were published in a 16 volume report titled "Animas–La Plata Project".

The Ute Mountain Ute Tribe was involved in all aspects of the Animas–La Plata Project, including consulting with other tribes, engaging with the public, and handling archeological issues. By the end of the project, this gave them the confidence to take over management of the cultural resources on their own reservation, resulting in the establishment of a Tribal Historic Preservation Office, the first in Colorado.

== Conclusions ==
Two of the pit houses contain 14,882 identified human body fragments, belonging to about 35 people, about half the estimated population of the village. The victims show signs of extreme torture and mutilation, including beating on the feet, scalping, and eye gouging. Because of biological and dietary differences between the residents of the village and other villages in the same area, some scientists believe that this provides evidence of ethnic cleansing. The site was apparently abandoned soon after the massacre, and the whole Ridges Basin within about 15 years after the event.

Archaeologists speculate that the village at Sacred Ridge had some form of authority over other settlements in the Ridges Basin area, and that the massacre is part of an uprising following a time of severe food shortages due, in part, to a drier climate. The graphic torture and dismemberment may have been part of a demonstration used to intimidate other elements of the population.

== Reburials ==
The Native American Graves Protection and Repatriation Act (NAGPRA) requires that any human remains found during excavations of Native American sites, along with all associated funerary objects, be returned to Native American control. In complying with these regulations, SWCA determined that the closest descendants of any human remains found were probably related most closely to the pueblos of Acoma, Laguna, and Zia. These pueblos are closely related and all speak Keresan languages. The Pueblo of Acoma volunteered to take the lead in these efforts, and the other pueblos agreed. Remains were reburied in three ceremonies between 2004 and 2010. A total of 230 individuals from all of the sites involved, as well as the processed remains from the massacre at Sacred Ridge, were reburied.
