= Tracer ammunition =

Illuminated pyrotechnic ammunition visible in daylight and darkness

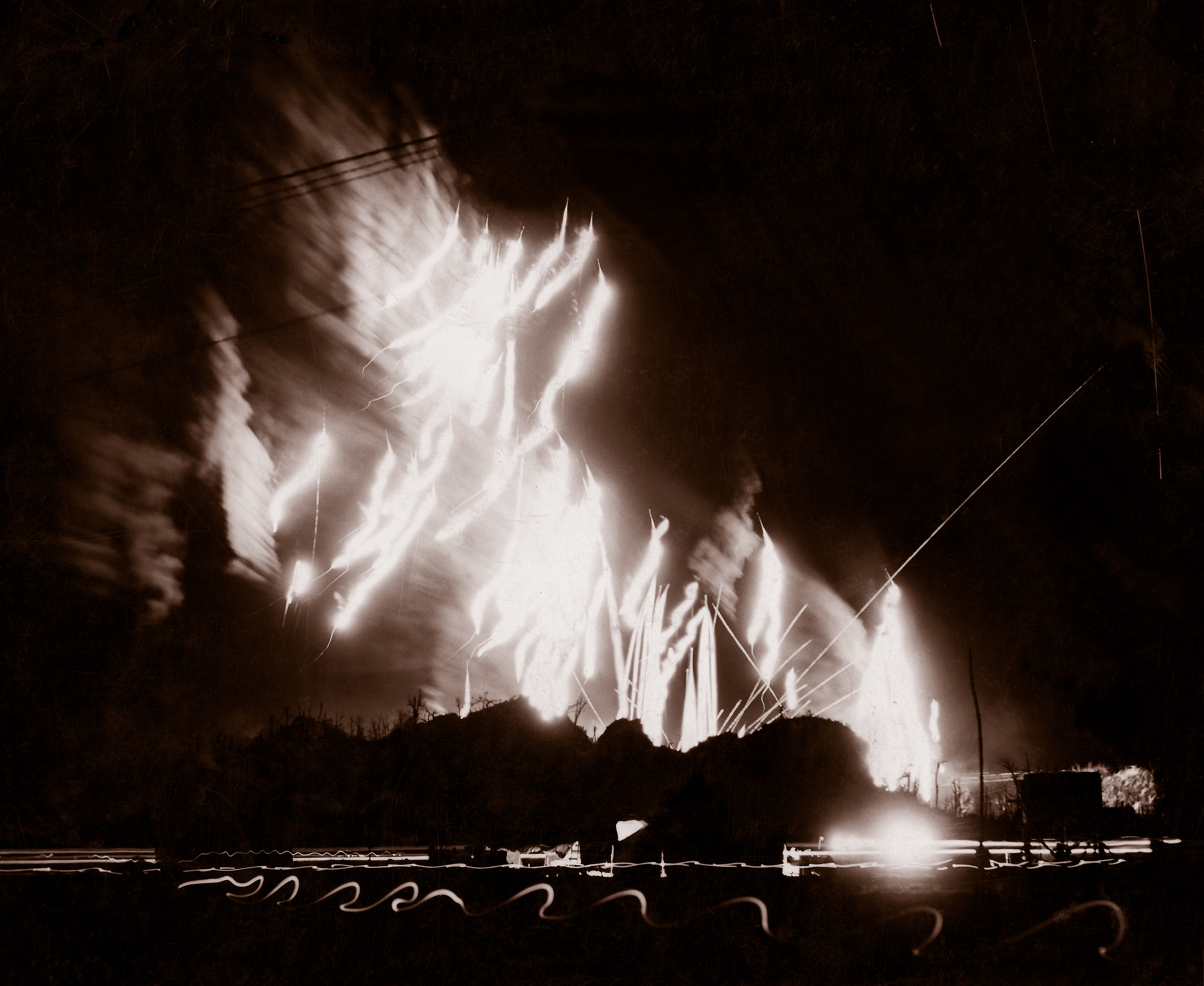
Tracer ammunition fired by United States military captured in a long-exposure photograph of a Japanese attack on Peleliu, 1944

Tracer ammunition, or tracers, are bullets or cannon-caliber projectiles that are built with a small pyrotechnic charge in their base. When fired, the pyrotechnic composition is ignited by the burning powder and burns very brightly, making the projectile trajectory visible to the naked eye during daylight, and very bright during nighttime firing. This allows the shooter to visually trace the trajectory of the projectile and thus make necessary ballistic corrections, without having to confirm projectile impacts and without even using the sights of the weapon. Tracer fire can also be used as a marking tool to signal other shooters to concentrate their fire on a particular target during battle.

When used, tracers are usually loaded as every fifth round in machine gun belts, referred to as four-to-one tracer. Platoon and squad leaders will load some tracer rounds in their magazine or even use solely tracers to mark targets for their soldiers to fire on. Tracers are also sometimes placed two or three rounds from the bottom of magazines to alert shooters that their weapons are almost empty. During World War II, aircraft with fixed machine guns or cannons mounted would sometimes have a series of tracer rounds added near the end of the ammunition belts, to alert the pilot that they were almost out of ammunition. However, this practice similarly alerted astute enemies that their foes were nearly out of ammunition. More often, however, the entire magazine was loaded four-to-one, on both fixed offensive and flexible defensive guns, to help mitigate the difficulties of aerial gunnery. Tracers were very common on most WWII aircraft, except for night fighters, which needed to be able to attack and shoot down the enemy before they realized they were under attack, and without betraying their own location to the enemy defensive gunners. The United States relied heavily on tracer ammunition for the defensive Browning M2 .50 caliber machine guns on its heavy bombers, such as the B-24 Liberator.

== History ==
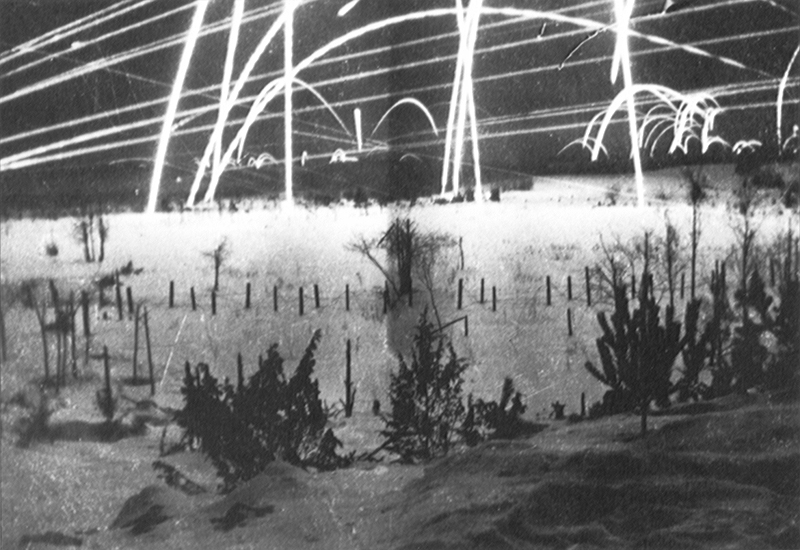
Tracer fire on Finnish-Soviet border during the Winter War (1939–1940)

There are fireworks manuals from the 14th century specifying a way to make "flaming cannonballs," with pitch, gunpowder, a cloth/cordage cover, and finally smearing them with lard and tallow. These were however not available for small arms, and before the development of tracers, gunners still relied on seeing their bullets' impact to adjust their aim. However, these were not always visible, especially as the effective range of ammunition increased dramatically during the later half of the 19th century, meaning the bullets could impact a mile or more away in long-range area fire. In the early 20th century, ammunition designers developed "spotlight" bullets, which would create a flash or smoke puff on impact to increase their visibility. However, these projectiles were deemed in violation of the Hague Conventions' prohibition of "exploding bullets." This strategy was also useless when firing at aircraft, as there was nothing for the projectiles to hit if they missed the target. Designers also developed bullets that would trail white smoke. However, these designs required an excessive amount of mass loss to generate a satisfactory trail. The loss of mass en route to the target severely affected the bullet's ballistics.

The United Kingdom was the first to develop and introduce a tracer round, a version of the .303 cartridge in 1915. The United States introduced a .30-06 tracer in 1917. Prior to adopting red (among a variety of other colors) bullet tips for tracers, American tracers were identified by blackened cartridge cases.

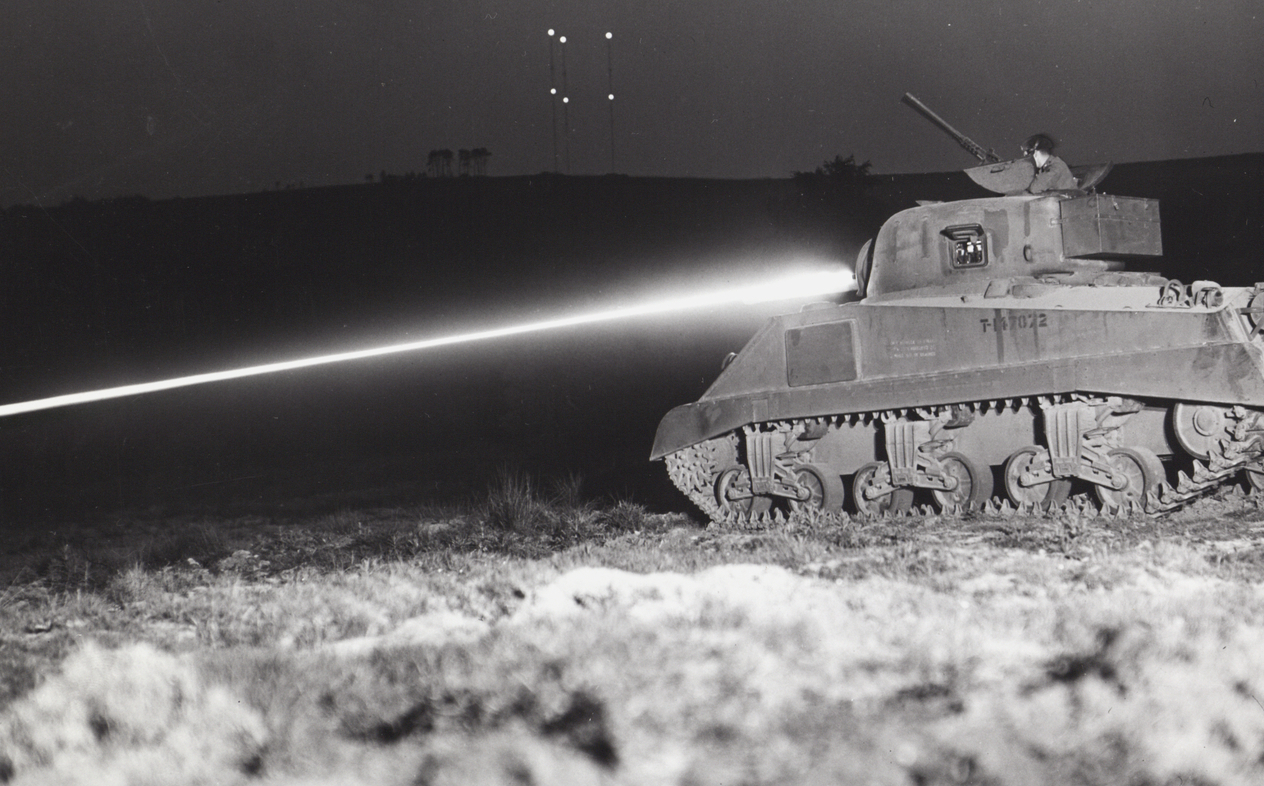
Canadian tank in England shooting tracer rounds from its machine gun

Tracers proved useful as a countermeasure against Zeppelins used by Germany during World War I. The airships were used for reconnaissance, surveillance, and bombing operations. Normal bullets merely had the effect of causing a slow leak, but tracers could ignite the hydrogen gasbags, and bring down the airship quickly.

In World War II US Naval and marine aircrew were issued tracer rounds with their side arms for emergency signaling use as well as defense.

== Construction ==
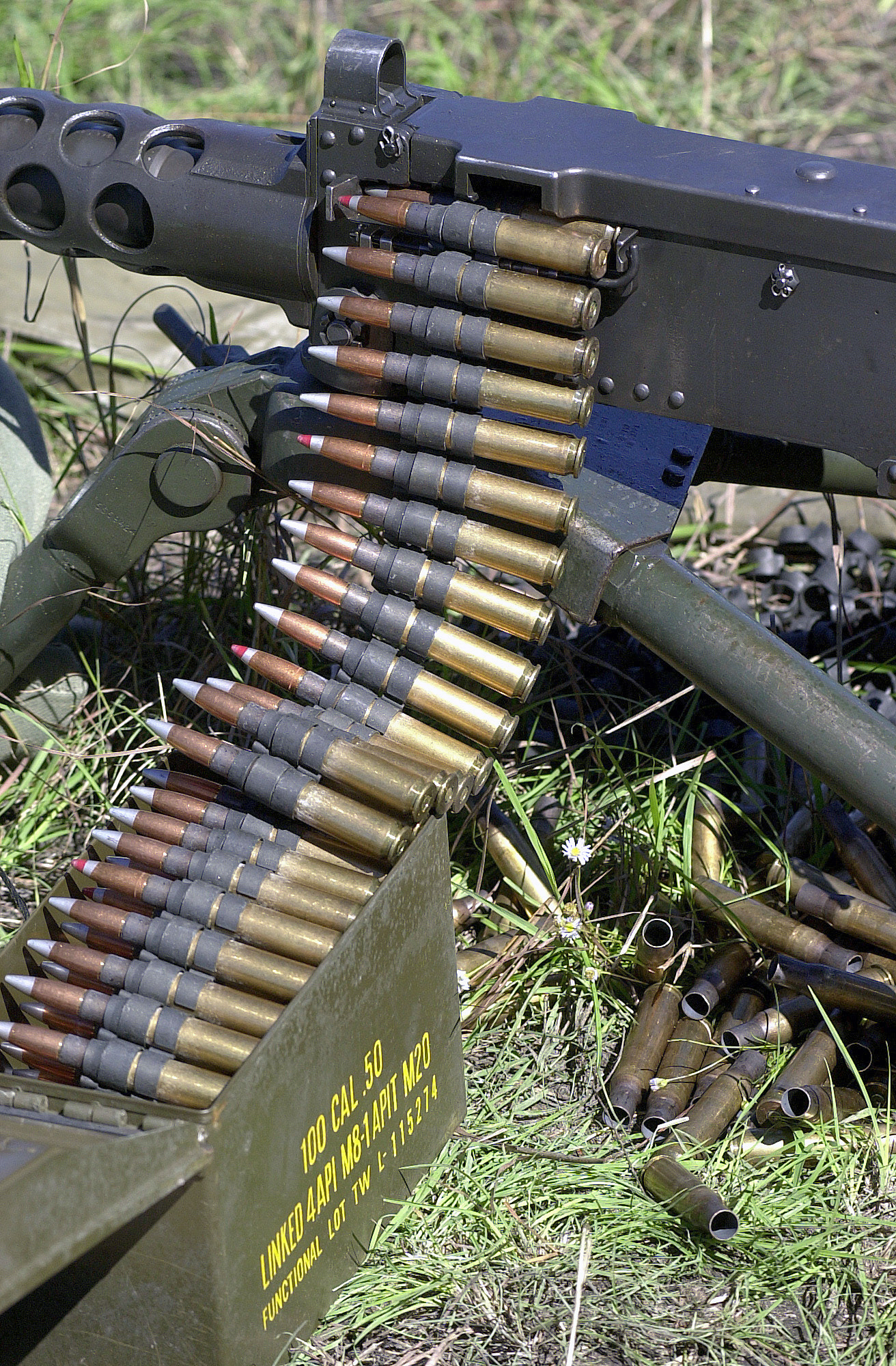
M2HB Browning machine gun and armor-piercing incendiary (M8) ammunition loaded. Note every fifth round is a red-and-silver-tipped armor-piercing incendiary tracer round (M20).

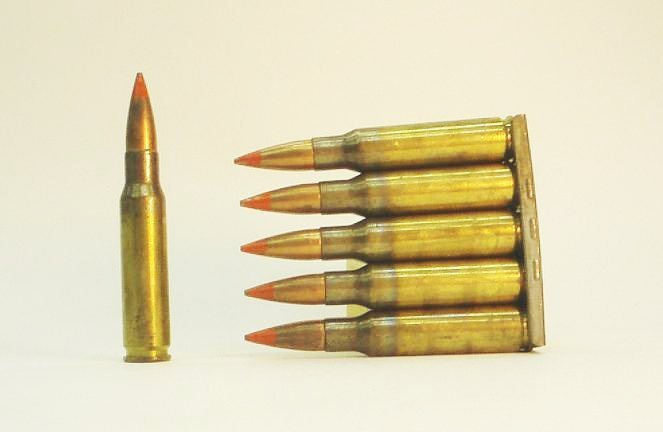
7.62×51mm NATO Orange-tipped FMJ tracer ammunition in a five-round stripper clip

A tracer projectile is constructed with a hollow base filled with a pyrotechnic flare material, made of a mixture of a very finely ground metallic fuel, oxidizer, and a small amount of organic fuel. Metallic fuels include magnesium, aluminum, and occasionally zirconium. The oxidizer is a salt molecule that contains oxygen combined with a specific atom responsible for the desired color output. Upon ignition, the heated salt releases its oxygen to sustain the combustion of the fuel in the mixture. The color-emitting atom in the salt is also released and reacts chemically with excess oxygen providing the source of the colored flame. In NATO standard ammunition (including US), the oxidizer salt is usually a mixture of strontium compounds (nitrate, peroxide, etc.) and the metallic fuel is magnesium. Burning strontium yields a bright red light. Russian and Chinese tracer ammunition generates green light using barium salts. An oxidizer and metallic fuel alone, however, do not make a practical pyrotechnic for the purpose of producing colored light. The reaction is too energetic, consuming all of the fuel in one big flash of white light – white light being the characteristic output of magnesium-oxide (MgO), for example. Therefore, in the case of using strontium nitrate and magnesium, to produce a red-colored flame that is not over-powered by the white light from the burning fuel, a chlorine donor is included in the pyrotechnic mixture so that strontium chloride can also form in the flame, cooling it so that the white light of MgO is greatly reduced. Cooling the flame in this manner also lengthens the reaction rate so that the mixture has an appreciable burn time. Polyvinyl chloride (PVC) is a typical organic fuel in colored light for this purpose. Some modern designs use compositions that produce little to no visible light and radiate mainly in infrared, visible only on night vision equipment.

== Types ==
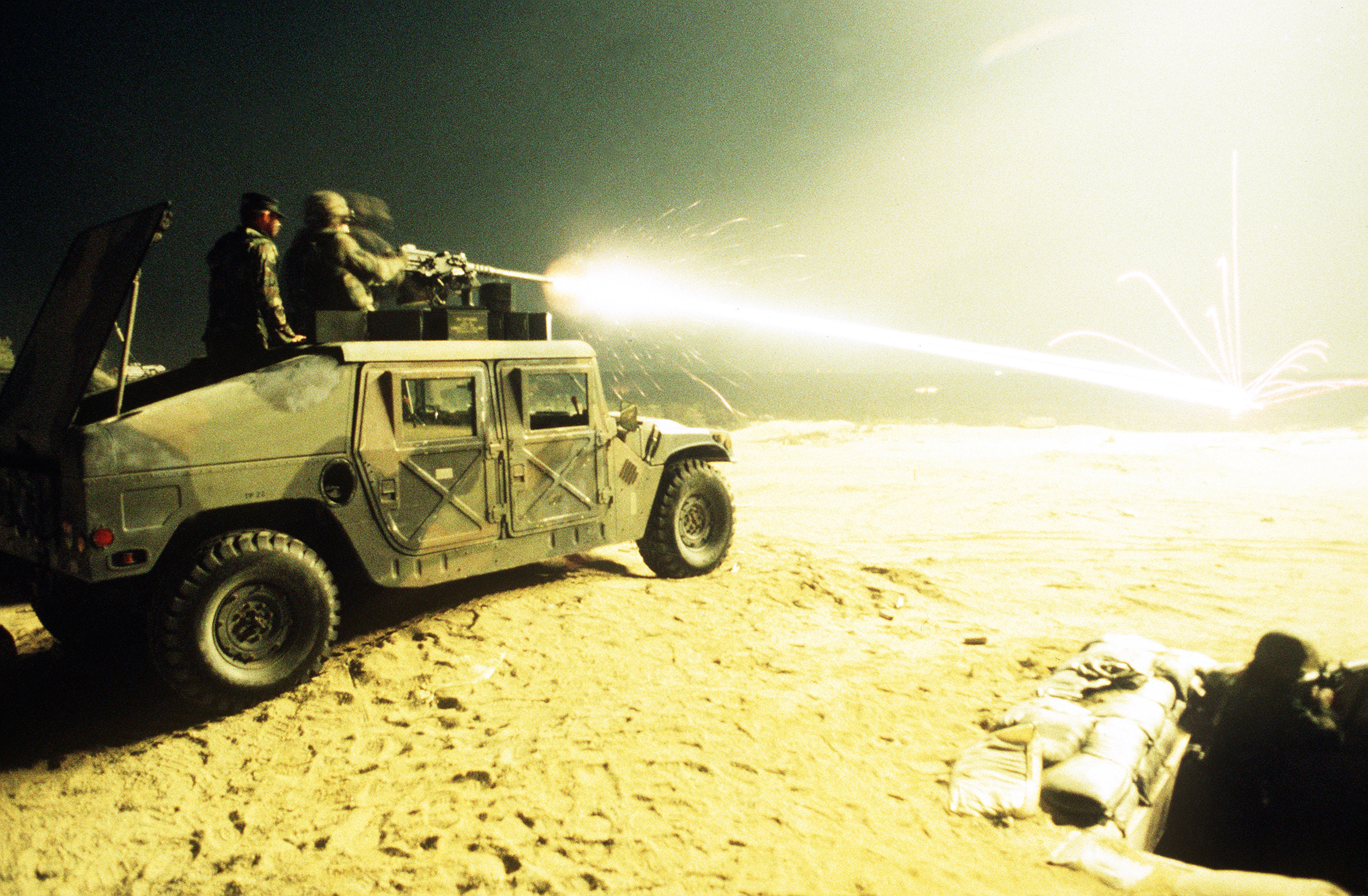
Tracer rounds fired from a .50 caliber M2HB heavy machine gun mounted on a HMMWV ricochet off a decommissioned tank being used as a training target at the Air Mobility Warfare Center.

There are three types of tracers: bright tracer, subdued tracer, and dim tracer. Bright tracers are the standard type, which starts burning very shortly after exiting the muzzle. A disadvantage of bright tracers is that they give away the shooter's location to the enemy; as a military adage puts it, "tracers work both ways". Bright tracers can also overwhelm night-vision devices, rendering them useless. Subdued tracers burn at full brightness after a hundred or more yards to avoid giving away the gunner's position. Dim tracers burn very dimly but are clearly visible through night-vision equipment.

The M196 tracer cartridge (54-grain bullet) 5.56×45mm NATO was developed for the original M16 rifle and is compatible with the M16A1 barrel also using 1:12 rifling twist. It has a red tip and is designed to trace out to 500 yards, and its trajectory matches the M193 (56-grain) ball cartridge, which has no tip color. Trajectory match, or ballistic match, is achieved between two bullets of slightly different weight and aerodynamic characteristics by adjusting the cartridge propellant weight, propellant type, and muzzle velocity, to remain within safe pressure limits yet provide each bullet with a trajectory to the target that is nearly identical over all atmospheric conditions and target engagement ranges while using the same gunsight aimpoint. Trajectory match is not intended to be perfect, an engineering impossibility even before considering that the tracer loses mass and therefore changes its drag properties as it flies. The intent is that the tracer matches the "real" round well enough for the purposes of machinegun fire.

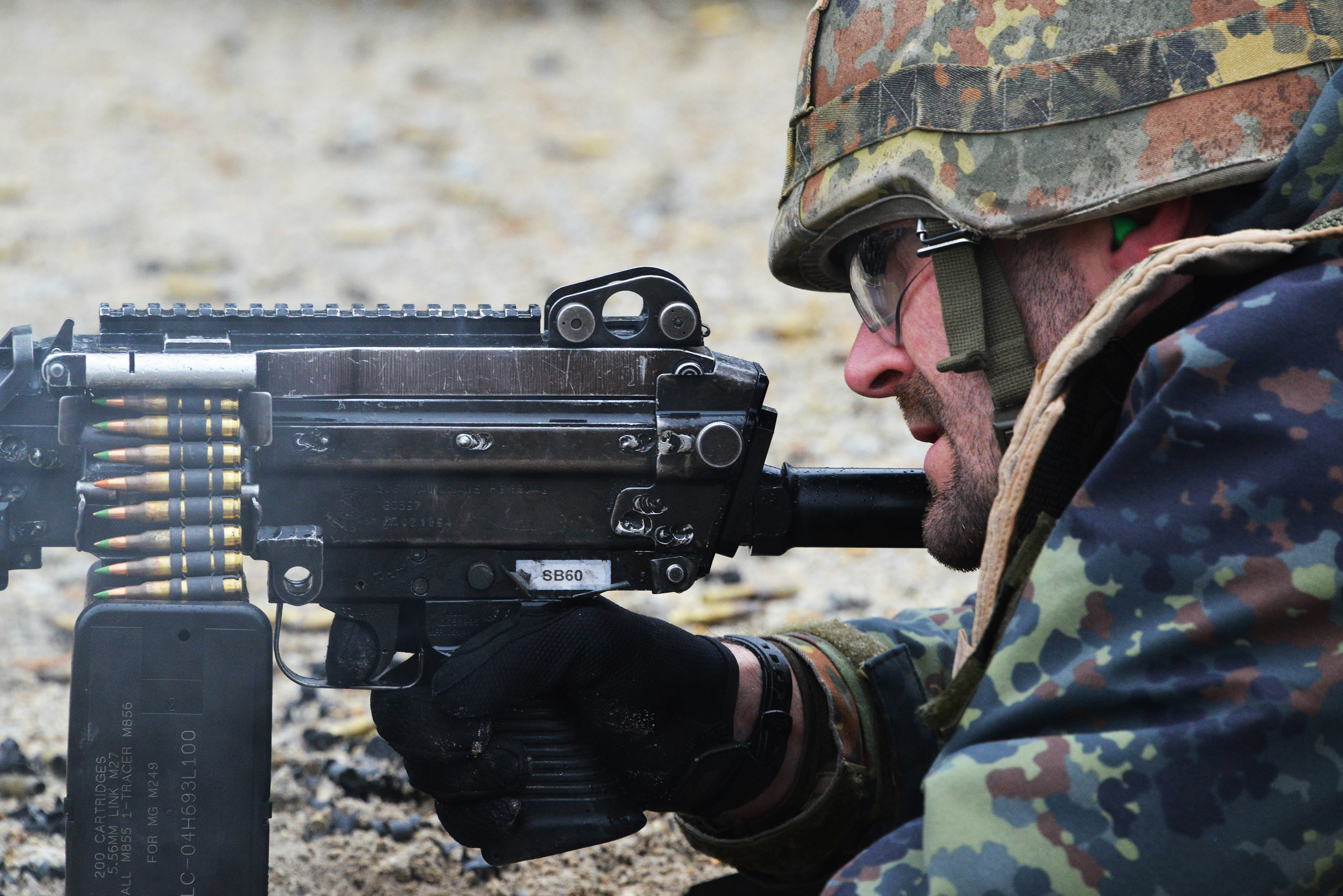
M27 links connect up to 200 5.56×45mm NATO rounds (4 × M855 ball : 1 M856 tracer) contained in an ammunition box used to feed a M249 light machine gun

The M856 tracer cartridge (63.7-grain bullet) is used in the M16A2/3/4, M4-series, and M249 weapons (among other 5.56mm NATO weapons). This round is designed to trace out to 875 yards, has an orange tip color, and is trajectory matched to the M855 (62-grain, green tip) ball cartridge. The M856 tracer should not be used in the M16A1 except under emergency conditions and only in relatively warm weather, because the M16A1's slower 1:12 rifling twist is not sufficient to properly stabilize this projectile at colder combat service temperatures (freezing down to –40 degrees), when the air density is much greater, disrupting the gyroscopic stability of the bullet. The M16A2 and newer models have a rifling twist of 1 in 7" necessary to stabilize the M856 tracer round under all temperature conditions. (The M196, however, does function safely in all 1:7 twist barrels, as well as those with 1:12 twist.)

The M25 is an orange-tipped 30-06 Springfield tracer cartridge consisting of a 145 gr bullet with 50 grains of IMR 4895 powder. The tracer compound contains composition R 321 which is 16% polyvinyl chloride, 26% magnesium powder, and 52% strontium nitrate.

The M62 is an orange-tipped 7.62×51mm NATO tracer consisting of a 142 gr bullet with 46 grains of WC 846 powder. The tracer compound contains composition R 284 which is 17% polyvinyl chloride, 28% magnesium powder, and 55% strontium nitrate. (This is the same composition used on the M196.)

The M276 is a violet-tipped 7.62×51mm NATO dim tracer that uses composition R 440, which is barium peroxide, strontium peroxide, calcium resinate (for example, calcium abietate), and magnesium carbonate.

Tracer compositions can also emit primarily in infrared, for use with night-vision devices. An example composition is boron, potassium perchlorate, sodium salicylate, iron carbonate or magnesium carbonate (as combustion retardant), and binder. Many variants exist.

== Other applications ==
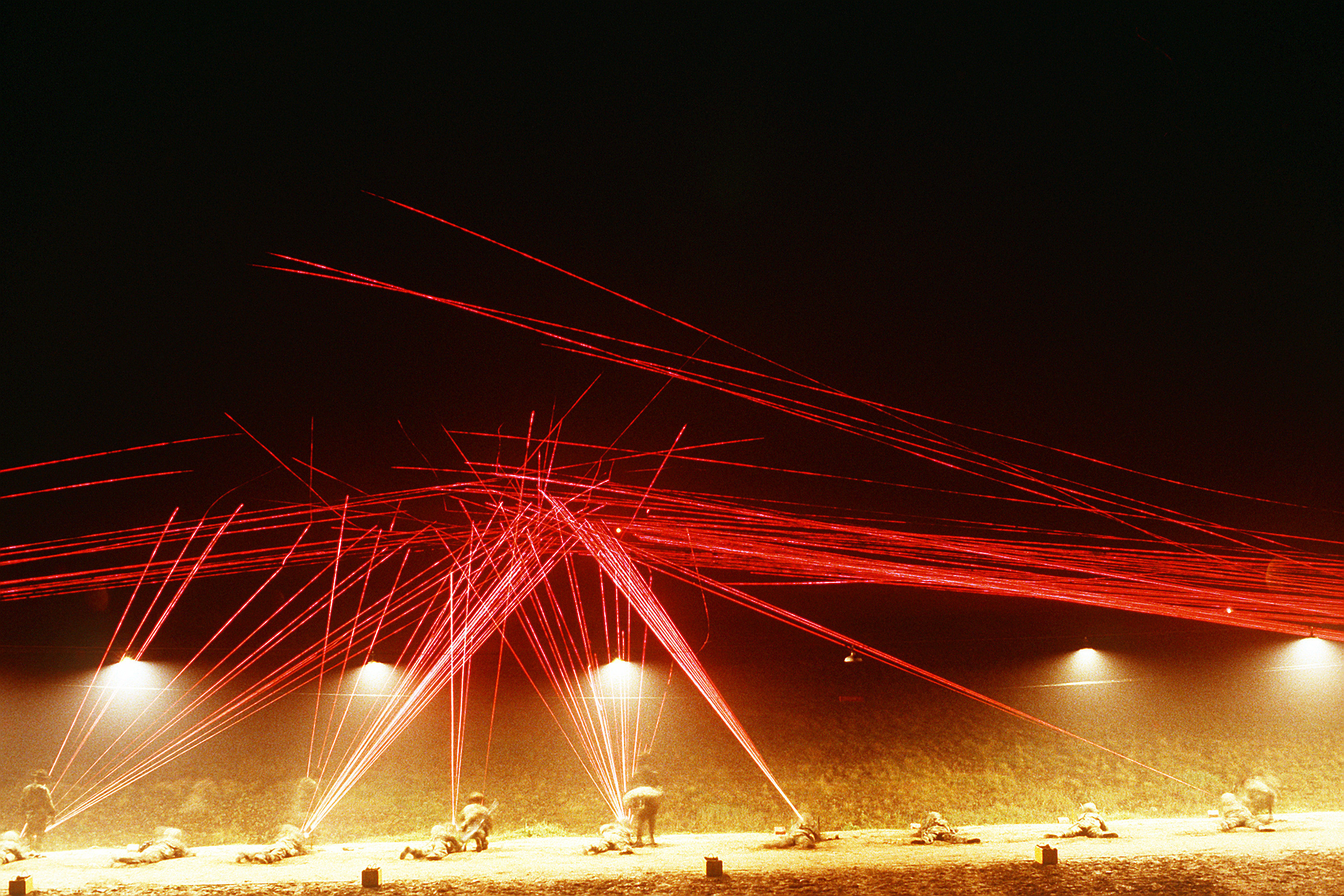
Tracer fire lights up the night sky at Marine Corps Base Camp Pendleton as recruits engage targets during a night-fire exercise.

Tracers can also serve to direct fire at a given target because they are visible to other combatants. The disadvantage is that they betray the gunner's position; the tracer path leads back to its source. To make it more difficult for an enemy to do this, most modern tracers have a delay element, which results in the trace becoming visible some distance from the muzzle.

Depending on the target, tracer bullet lethality may be similar to standard ball ammunition. The forward portion of a tracer bullet contains a substantial slug of lead filler, nearly as much as the non-tracer ball round that it trajectory matches. In the case of the M196/M193 bullet set, the lethality differences are probably negligible for this reason. However, with the M856/M855 bullet set, the M855 ball round contains a steel penetrator tip that is not present in the M856 tracer bullet. As a result, different lethality effects can be expected against various targets. Nevertheless, under some circumstances, a slight degradation in lethality can often be made up for by the psychological and suppressive-fire effects tracer bullets can have on an enemy who is receiving them.

Besides guiding the shooter's direction of fire, tracer rounds can also be loaded at the end of a magazine to alert the shooter that the magazine is almost empty. This is particularly useful in weapons that do not lock the bolt back when empty (such as the AK-47). During World War II, the Soviet Air Force also used this practice for aircraft machine guns. One disadvantage in this practice is that the enemy is alerted that the pilot or shooter is low on ammunition and possibly vulnerable. For ground forces, this generally offers no tactical advantage to the enemy, since a soldier with a crew-served weapon such as a machine gun who is out of ammunition is supposed to alert his team that he is "dry" and rely on their cover fire while he reloads the machine gun. Thus, an enemy must risk exposing himself in order to attack the reloading soldier.

Modern jet fighters primarily rely on radar and infrared seeker missiles to track and destroy enemy planes and laser-guided missiles to attack surface targets, rather than the plane's cannon, which may be just an ancillary weapon for air-to-air combat; although in the ground attack role, cannon fire may be emphasized. However, modern fighter aircraft use gyroscopes and inertial sensors coupled with radar and optical computing gunsights that make the use of tracers in cannon ammunition unnecessary. As long as the pilot can put the "pipper" (aiming point) in the head-up display (HUD) onto the target, he can be assured that the burst will be on target since the computers automatically compute range, closing rate, deflection, lateral accelerations, and even weather conditions to calculate target lead and aimpoint. Thus one of the primary reasons for using tracers on aircraft in the first place, uncertainty over where the bullets will end up in relation to the target, is removed.

Another use for the tracer is in tank hull machineguns, of mostly outdated tanks, where the machinegun operator cannot sight directly along the barrel, thus he has to rely on tracer bullets to guide his aim. Modern main battle tanks and armored fighting vehicles, however, employ advanced fire control systems that can accurately aim secondary weapons along with the main armament; although the continued use of tracers provides reassurance to gunners on the direction of machinegun fire.

In anti-aircraft autocannon tracer ammunition, the tracer material can be part of a shell self-destruct mechanism to prevent missed shots from falling back down on friendly targets. As the tracer material burns to the end it triggers the self-destruct.

== Safety restrictions ==
Tracers are associated with grass fires if used in summer over dry vegetation.

In the UK, the use of tracers is prohibited on National Rifle Association-operated ranges, due to the increased risk of fire. Use of tracers is usually only authorized during military training. During spells of hot weather, the Ministry of Defence will suspend the use of tracers for non-essential training to reduce the risk of wildfires on sites such as Salisbury Plain.

In July 2009, a large fire was started by tracer ammunition near Marseille, France, an area where shrub vegetation is very dry and flammable in the summer, and where normally this kind of ammunition should not be used.

On February 24, 2013, a fire was started at DFW Gun Club in Dallas, Texas, by the use of a tracer round inside the facility.

On July 3, 2018, the Lake Christine Fire near Basalt, Colorado, was started by tracer rounds fired at a gun range. The two individuals who were deemed responsible for the fire were shooting the tracer round ammunition outside of the designated target area at the gun range.

== See also ==
- Fire arrow
- Incendiary ammunition
- Variable density goggles
- Penetration aid, a term (predominantly used in aviation/strategic weaponry) for a device/tactic to increase the capability of reaching the target.
- Spotting rifle
