= 2015 Gold King Mine waste water spill =

Environmental disaster near Silverton, Colorado

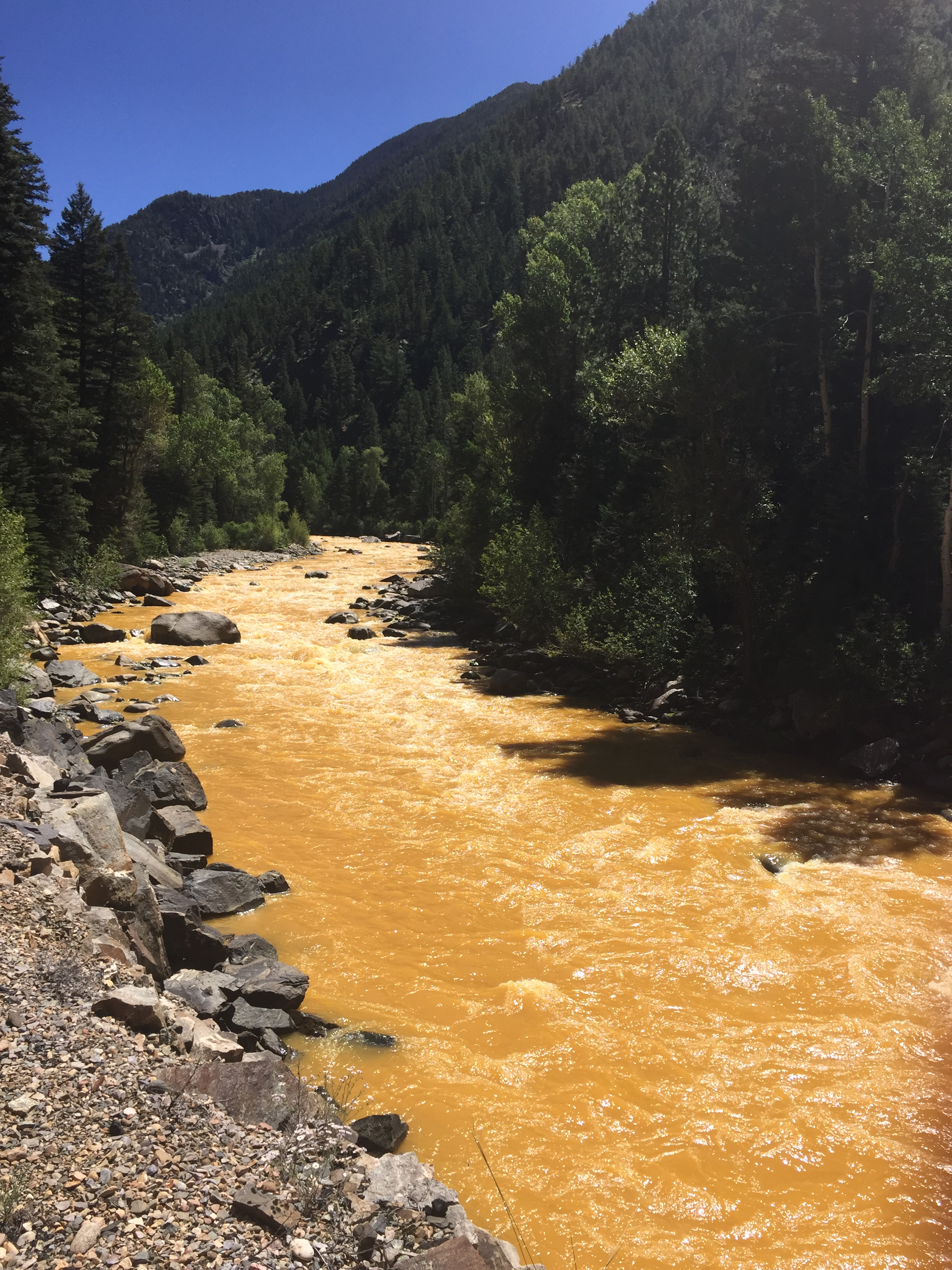
- The Animas River between Silverton and Durango within 24 hours of the spill. The river turned yellow from the oxidation of dissolved iron in the escaped waste water.
- Date: August 5, 2015; 11 years ago
- Location: Gold King Mine Silverton, Colorado, United States; 37°53′40″N 107°38′18″W
- Cause: Accidental waste water release, approx. 3 million US gal (11,000 m^{3})
- Participants: Environmental Protection Agency
- Outcome: River closures (until about Aug 17 with ongoing tests); Ongoing water supply and irrigation issues
- Waterways affected: Animas and San Juan rivers
- States affected: Colorado, New Mexico, Arizona, Utah
- Website: EPA updates

Gold King Mine (Colorado)

The 2015 Gold King Mine waste water spill was an environmental disaster that began at the Gold King Mine near Silverton, Colorado, when Environmental Protection Agency (EPA) personnel, along with workers for Environmental Restoration LLC (a Missouri company under EPA contract to mitigate pollutants from the closed mine), caused the release of toxic waste water into the Animas River watershed. They caused the accident by breaching a tailings dam while attempting to drain ponded water near the entrance of the mine on August 5. After the spill, the Silverton Board of Trustees and the San Juan County Commission approved a joint resolution seeking Superfund money.

Contractors accidentally destroyed the plug holding water trapped inside the mine, which caused an overflow of the pond, spilling three million US gallons (eleven thousand cubic metres) of mine waste water and tailings, including heavy metals such as cadmium and lead, and other toxic elements, such as arsenic, beryllium, zinc, iron and copper into Cement Creek, a tributary of the Animas River and part of the San Juan River and Colorado River watershed. The EPA was criticized for not warning Colorado and New Mexico about the operation until the day after the waste water spilled, despite the fact the EPA employee "in charge of Gold King Mine knew of blowout risk."

The EPA has taken responsibility for the incident, but refused to pay for any damages claims filed after the accident on grounds of sovereign immunity, pending special authorization from Congress or re-filing of lawsuits in federal court. Governor of Colorado John Hickenlooper declared the affected area a disaster zone. The spill affected waterways of municipalities in the states of Colorado, New Mexico, and Utah, as well as the Navajo Nation. It is estimated that acidic water spilled at a rate of 500–700 US gal/min (1.9–2.6 m^{3}/min) while remediation efforts were underway. The event drew attention to toxic drainage from many similar abandoned mines throughout the country.

== Background ==
Gold mining in the hills around Gold King was the primary income and economy for the region until 1991, when the last mine closed near Silverton. The Gold King Mine was abandoned in 1923. Prior to the spill, the Upper Animas water basin had already become devoid of fish, because of the adverse environmental impacts of regional mines such as Gold King, when contaminants entered the water system. Other plant and animal species were also adversely affected in the watershed before the mine breach.

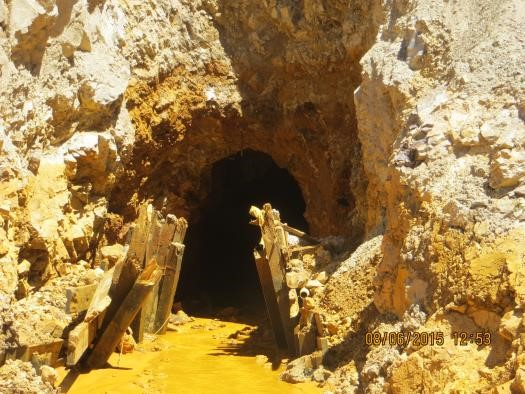
Entrance to Gold King Mine from EPA site management web site. This is the adit known as Gold King 7 Level.

Many abandoned mines throughout Colorado are known to have problems with acid mine drainage. The chemical processes involved in acid mine drainage are common around the world: where subsurface mining exposes metal sulfide minerals such as pyrite to water and air, this water must be carefully managed to prevent harm to riparian ecology. At the time of the accident, the EPA was working at the mine to stem the leaking mine water going into Cement Creek. Water was accumulating behind a plug at the mine's entrance. They planned to add pipes that would allow the slow release and treatment of that water before it backed up enough to blow out. Unknown to the crew, the mine tunnel behind the plug was already full of pressurized water. It burst through the plug soon after excavation began.

In the 1990s, sections of the Animas had been nominated by the EPA as a Superfund site for clean-up of pollutants from the Gold King Mine and other mining operations along the river. Lack of community support prevented its listing. Under the law, the EPA had authority to do only minor work to abate environmental impacts of the mine. Locals had feared that classifying this as a Superfund site would reduce tourism in the area, which was the largest remaining source of income for the region since the closure of the metal mines.

=== Mine ownership ===
Gold King Mine was originally discovered and owned by Olaf Nelson the "Mighty Swede" in 1887. Nelson died before he could develop the mine, leaving his widow to sell the mine in 1894.

=== Prior reclamation ===
The mine's adits were dry for most of the mine's recent history, as the area was being drained from below by the Sunnyside Mine's American Tunnel. Sunnyside Mine closed in 1991. As part of a reclamation plan, the American Tunnel was sealed up in 1996. In the absence of drainage, by 2002 a new discharge of particularly contaminated water had begun to flow from the Gold King Level 7 adit. Flow there increased again after the nearby Mogul Mine was sealed by its owners in 2003.

In 2006, a spot measurement of flow from this adit showed a peak of 314 US gal/min (1,190 L/min). The significance of this figure is unclear since flow was not being logged continuously. By this time, Gold King was considered one of the worst acid mine drainage sites in Colorado. In 2009, the Colorado Department of Natural Resources Division of Reclamation, Mining and Safety (DRMS) plugged all four Gold King Mine portals by stuffing them with old mine backfill; drainage pipes were installed to prevent water from ponding behind the entrance. This work was complicated by partial collapse of the mine tunnel near the entrance. It was noted that the drainage system might not be sufficient to prevent a future blowout.

In 2014, Colorado DRMS asked the EPA to reopen and stabilize the Gold King 7 adit. Reportedly no maintenance on the existing drainage system had been performed since it was installed in 2009. It was noted that flow from the drains had decreased from 112 to 12.6 US gal/min (424–48 L/min) between August 25, 2014, and September 11, 2014. The cause of this decrease was unknown but attributed to seasonal variation. While excavating the opening, workers saw seepage at six feet (1.8 m) above the bottom of the tunnel; they believed that meant that there was six feet (1.8 m) of water backed up in the tunnel. Excavation at the entrance was postponed until 2015, so that a pond large enough to treat that volume of water could be constructed.

=== Blowout ===
The EPA team returned in July 2015 to continue the work. They found that a landslide had covered the drainage pipes. When the slide was cleared, seepage was again observed at a level about six feet (1.8 m) above the bottom of the mine entrance, which they thought was the level of pooled water behind the plug. They planned to excavate the entrance beginning from the level of the top of the mine tunnel down to what they took to be the top of the water, insert a pipe through that clearance, and drain the pooled water. DRMS and the EPA discussed the plan and came to an agreement. However, they had misjudged the level of the water in the tunnel.

At around 10:51 am on August 5, the backhoe operator saw a spurt of clear water spray about two feet (60 cm) out of a fracture in the wall of the plug, indicating that the mine tunnel was full of pressurized water. (Note: The water was under pressure because the flooded adit sloped upward away from the entrance, gaining about 10 ft (3.0 m) in elevation over 1,000 ft (300 m) horizontally. If the water was one foot (0.30 m) deep there, this would correspond to the weight of 11 ft (3.4 m) of water on the plug.) Failure of the plug produced uncontrolled release within minutes. Rushing to Cement Creek, the torrent of water washed out the access road to the site.

The EPA had considered drilling into the mine from above in order to measure the water level directly before beginning excavation at the entrance, as was done at nearby mines in 2011. Had they done so, they would have discovered the true water level, and changed their plan; the disaster would not have occurred. Operating mines have been required to perform such measurement of water level since a fatal mine flood in 1895.

== Environmental impact ==
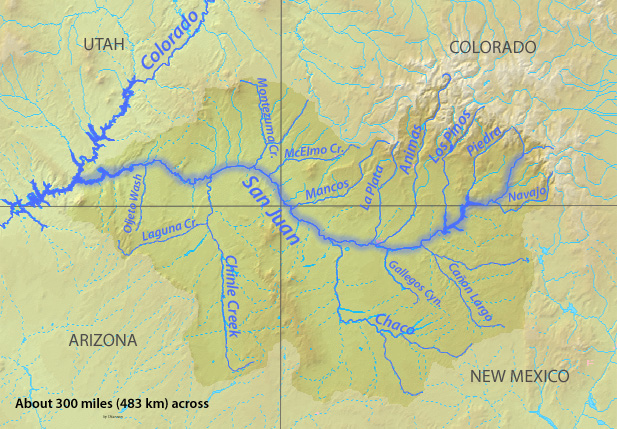
A map of the San Juan River watershed, which drains into the Colorado river, showing the northern tributary of the Animas River

The impact on the Animas River was quickly visible; one Durango-based journalist described the water color after the accident as "Tang that has been maybe mixed too thickly." The river was closed to recreation until August 14. During the closure, county officials warned river visitors to stay out of the water. Residents with wells in floodplains were told to have their water tested before drinking it or bathing in it. People were told to avoid contact with the river, including contact by their pets, and to prevent farmed animals from drinking the water. They were advised not to catch fish in the river. The Navajo Nation Commission on Emergency Management issued a state of emergency declaration in response to the spill; it has suffered devastating effects. (Note: The impact on the Navajo Nation has been reported in various publications: The Portland Press Herald reported that the disaster is "devastating to the Navajo Nation." By August 12, the New York Post reported that "Bottled water on the Navajo Nation is becoming scarce." CNN reported: "the Navajo Nation in New Mexico appears to have the most at risk.")

People living along the Animas and San Juan rivers were advised to have their water tested before using it for cooking, drinking, or bathing. The spill was expected to cause major problems for farmers and ranchers who rely on the rivers for their livelihoods.

The long-term impacts of the spill are unknown, as sedimentation is expected to dilute the pollutants as the spill cloud moves downstream. The acid mine drainage temporarily changed the color of the river to orange.

By August 7, the waste reached Aztec, New Mexico; the next day, it reached the city of Farmington, the largest municipality affected by the disaster. By August 10, the waste had reached the San Juan River in New Mexico and Shiprock (part of the Navajo Nation), with no evidence to that date of human injury or wildlife die-off. The heavy metals appeared to be settling to the bottom of the river. They are largely insoluble unless the entire river becomes very acidic. The waste was initially expected to reach Lake Powell by August 12; arriving on August 14, it was expected to pass through the lake within two weeks.

The Utah Division of Water Quality said the remaining contaminants will be diluted to a point where there will be no danger to users beyond that point. By August 11, pollutant levels at Durango returned to pre-incident levels. On August 12, the leading edge of the plume was no longer visible due to dilution and sediment levels in the river. The discharge rate of waste water at the mine was 610 US gal/min (2,300 L/min) as of August 12.

=== Heavy metals ===
On August 10, 2015, the EPA reported that levels of six metals were above limits allowed for domestic water by the Colorado Department of Public Health and Environment. The department requires municipalities to cease to use water when the levels in it exceed the limits. Some metals were found at hundreds of times their limits, e.g. lead 100 times the limit, iron 326 times the limit. Arsenic and cadmium were also above the limits. The measurement was made 15 miles (24 km) upstream from Durango. In January 2018, science and engineering consultants Knight Piésold reported, while the spill had "further limited aquatic life," its "resulting impacts on aquatic life, including the trout fishery downstream of Silverton, would undoubtedly be more adverse" were it not for actions taken by Sunnyside Gold Corporation, and that "Before the first miner arrived, there was massive natural metals loading in the Animas River, which limited aquatic life, including trout populations downstream from Silverton."

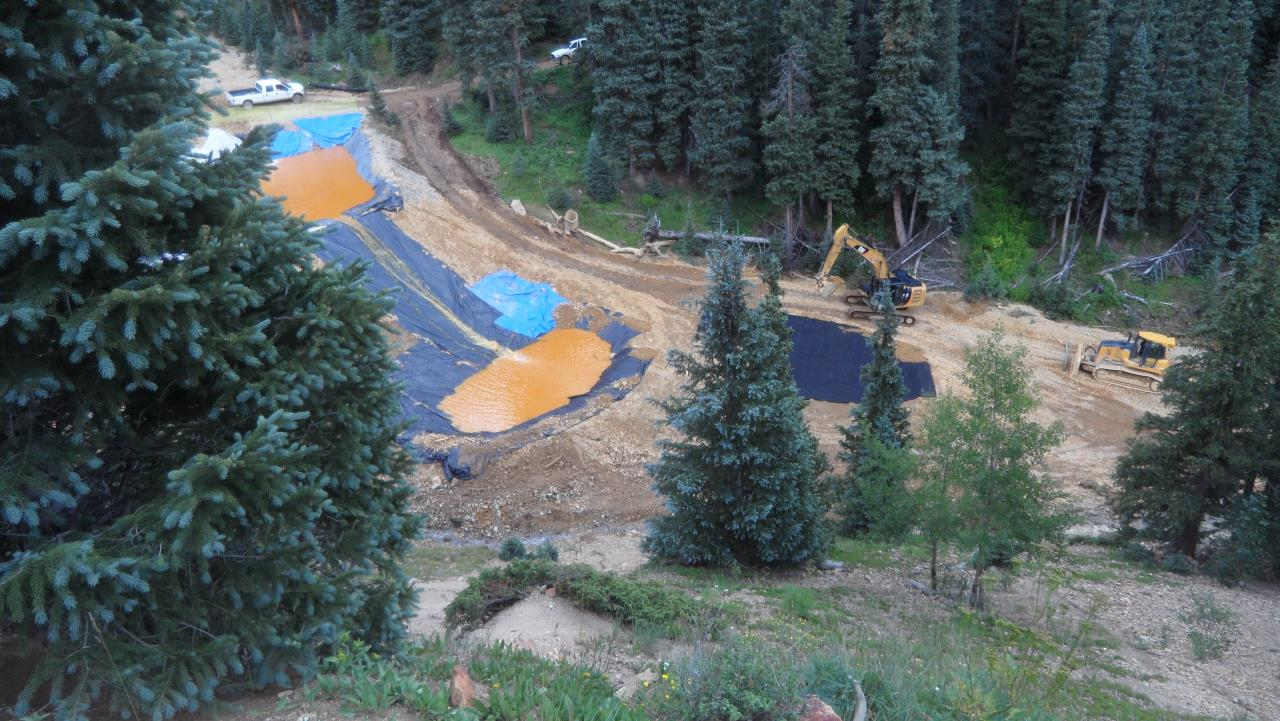
Emergency tailing ponds constructed in response to the spill, pictured on August 7, 2015

== Government action ==
Through a FOIA request, the Associated Press obtained EPA files indicating that U.S. government officials "knew of 'blowout' risk for tainted water at [the] mine," which could result from the EPA's intervention. EPA authorities had learned of this risk through a June 2014 work order that read "Conditions may exist that could result in a blowout of the blockages and cause a release of large volumes of contaminated mine waters and sediment from inside the mine, which contain concentrated heavy metals." In addition, a May 2015 action plan for the mine "also noted the potential for a blowout." An EPA spokeswoman was not able to state what precautions the EPA took.

=== Immediate response ===
On February 11, 2016, the Denver Post reported that Hays Griswold, the EPA employee in charge of the mine, wrote in an e-mail to other EPA officials "that he personally knew the blockage 'could be holding back a lot of water and I believe the others in the group knew as well.'" The Post added: "Griswold's e-mail appears directly to contradict those findings and statements he made to The Denver Post in the days after the disaster, when he claimed 'nobody expected (the acid water backed up in the mine) to be that high.'"

The EPA took responsibility for the incident. The EPA had notified local residents of the spill 24 hours after it occurred, a delay which the press and local officials criticized. The Associated Press reported, 17 days after the spill: "In the wake of the spill, it has typically taken days to get any detailed response from the agency."

On August 8, Colorado Governor John Hickenlooper declared a disaster, as did Navajo President Russell Begaye.

On August 11, New Mexico Governor Susana Martinez also declared a state of emergency, after having viewed the affected river from a helicopter, and said her administration was ready to seek legal action against the EPA.

Multiple municipalities and jurisdictions along the course of the river, including the Navajo Nation, stopped drawing drinking water from the Animas River because of heavy metal contamination. President Begaye advised his people with livestock and farming against signing a form from the EPA saying that the Environmental Protection Agency is not responsible for the damage to crops and livestock. Despite assurances of safety from both the U.S. EPA and the Navajo Nation EPA, farmers of the Navajo Nation, on August 22, voted unanimously to refrain from using water from the Animas River for one year, overruling Begaye's plan to reopen irrigation canals.

Following the spill, the local governments of Silverton and San Juan County decided to accept Superfund money to fully remediate the mine. The Federal Emergency Management Agency (FEMA) rejected a request by the Navajo Nation to appoint a disaster-recovery coordinator.

A $1.5M water treatment plant built by the EPA to treat acid mine drainage from the mine began operation in October 2015. In June 2018, the EPA proposed a $10 million interim clean-up plan that was met with criticism for showing no actual benefit. Peter Butler of the Animas River Stakeholders Group wrote, "why is EPA not prioritizing where it can get the 'biggest bang for the buck' in terms of dollars spent for mine remediation?" and suggested that the speed of "Superfund clean-ups" may have supplanted local political interests. In April 2018, the Associated Press reported on allegations from the Sunnyside Gold Corp. claiming the EPA was "running its treatment plant at a fraction of capacity" and that "more than 350 million gallons (1.3 billion liters)—150 times the volume of the Gold King spill—have flowed around the treatment plant into a tributary of the Animas" since October 2015.

=== EPA involvement ===
After the initial spill had occurred, EPA supervisors were not contacted by the contractors who caused the spill until an hour after the blowout. There was no press release informing the state of the spill until around midnight that same day. Residents were not alerted directly of the spill until twenty-four hours after it had occurred. By this time people may have consumed the water from the river, which at the time contained a higher concentration of metals than advised by national drinking standards in terms of consumption. It was not until weeks after the spill that the water was considered clean enough for human consumption. During the time immediately following the spill, the EPA initially underestimated the amount of contaminated water drained into the Animas River and diverted questions about the water assessments of the river. In addition, an EPA administrator did not show up to the Silverton, Colorado area until a week after the spill had occurred.

=== Secondary spill ===
In July 2018, a truck carrying waste water from a temporary treatment plant crashed into a creek near the mine, spilling 9 cu yd (7 m^{3}) of sludge back into the area. The truck was hauling the waste to a new storage facility by Silverton, after another site near Howardsville, Colorado ran out of room.

== Monetary compensation ==
=== Navajo Nation ===
The effects of the mine spill on the Navajo Nation has included damage to their crops, home gardens, and cattle herds. The Navajo Nation ceased irrigating their crops from the San Juan River on August 7, 2015. While San Juan County in New Mexico lifted the ban on water from the San Juan River on August 15, 2015, Navajo Nation President Begaye, who had ongoing concerns about the water's safety, did not lift the Navajo Nation's ban until August 21, 2015. This followed the Navajo Nation's EPA completing its testing of the water. During this time, the U.S. EPA had water delivered to the Navajo Nation.

An estimated 2,000 Navajo farmers and ranchers were affected directly by the closing of the canals after the spill. While water was trucked into the area to provide water to fields, many home gardens and some remote farms did not receive any assistance. They suffered widespread crop damage.

The EPA and the Navajo Nation are still disputing how to fairly compensate the Navajo for the damage caused by the spill. As of April 22, 2016, the Navajo Nation has been compensated a total of $150,000 by the EPA, according to testimony at hearings of the Senate Committee on Indian Affairs. According to President Begaye, this is only 8% of the costs incurred by the Navajo Nation. According to Senator John McCain, the Navajo Nation could incur up to $335 million in costs related to the spill.

=== Lawsuits ===
A number of lawsuits were filed against the EPA after the mine spill transpired. New Mexico sought compensation in the amount of $130 million, Utah sought compensation in the amount of $1.9 billion, and the Navajo Nation sought compensation in the amount of $130 million. While at first the EPA recommended people affected by the spill file claims, they retracted this statement in January 2017. The EPA moved to dismiss all lawsuits in 2018, stating that they paid enough through the $29 million they spent to clean up the Animas River and other contaminated areas. EPA officials further argued that they have immunity under the Federal Tort Claims Act and therefore do not owe more compensation. The Gold King Mine litigation was centralized in April 2018 under the case name "In Re: Gold King Mine Release in San Juan County, Colorado, on August 5, 2015". The EPA and the United States ultimately settled all lawsuits against them regarding the Gold King Mine release. The most recent settlement with private landowner Todd Hennis was reached in June 2024.

== See also ==
- 2015 in the environment
- Water pollution
