= Animas-La Plata Water Project =

Water project in Colorado

Coordinates: 37.2199°N 107.8951°W

The Animas-La Plata water project is a water project designed to fulfill the water rights settlement of the Ute Mountain and the Southern Ute tribes of the Ute Nation in Colorado, USA.

Congress authorized planning for the United States Bureau of Reclamation project with Public Law 84–485 on 11 April 1956, and construction was authorized by the Colorado River Basin Project Act of 30 September 1968 (Public Law 90-537). The project was to supply 491,200 acre-feet (605,900,000 m^{3}) of water for irrigation, industrial and municipal water supply use in Colorado and New Mexico.

In 1978, Congress appropriated $710 million for the project but President Carter vetoed the entire appropriations bill to protest what he viewed as wasteful pork barrel projects. Congress overrode the veto. Cynthia Barnett, in her book "Mirage, Florida and the vanishing water of the Eastern U.S. (University of Michigan Press, 2007) writes that the project was the legacy of Congressman Wayne Aspinall of Colorado. Aspinall was the longtime chair of the House Interior Committee. According to Barnett, the Department of the Interior's Inspector General called the project economically unfeasible. And government auditors estimated that the project would return only 40 cents of benefits for every dollar spent (Mirage, pp. 46–47).

The final environmental impact statement was approved and released in 1980. Construction was expected to begin in 1980 or 1981. In 1988, the project was incorporated into the Colorado Ute Indian Water Rights Settlement Act (Public Law 100-585).) In 1996–97, Colorado Gov. Roy Romer and his lieutenant governor, Gail Schoettler, undertook an initiative to bring supporters and opponents together to address and resolve the issues and gain consensus on project alternatives. In 1998, the Department of the Interior issued a recommendation for a substantially scaled-down project designed primarily to satisfy Native American water rights, along with municipal and industrial needs in the immediate area secondarily, and completely excluding other non-Indian irrigation systems.

In April 2002 work on the project began. The project consists of three major components:

- A 280 cubic feet per second (7.9 m^{3}/s) pumping plant on the Animas River just south of downtown Durango, Colorado;
- An underground pipeline to carry project water from the pumping plant to the off-stream reservoir; and
- the reservoir, Lake Nighthorse, at Ridges Basin, southwest of Durango.

Construction officially ended in March 2013 when project status was changed to maintenance.

Lake Nighthorse stores about 120,000 acre-feet (150,000,000 m^{3}) of water. The average annual depletion rate is 57,100 acre-feet (70,400,000 m^{3}). The Lake Nighthorse reservoir started filling on 4 May 2009 and was filled to capacity by 29 June 2011.

As of March 2015, the Bureau or Reclamation was working with the city of Durango on a recreation lease and annexation agreement, as well as a cultural resource management plan to comply with Section 106 of the National Historic Preservation Act. Additional construction at the reservoir is planned to start in the summer of 2015.

In addition, the project includes a future buried pipeline from the Farmington, New Mexico, area to the Shiprock, New Mexico, area, supplying water for Navajo Nation usage.

== See also ==
- Animas River
- Lake Nighthorse
