= Lake Nighthorse =

Reservoir in Colorado

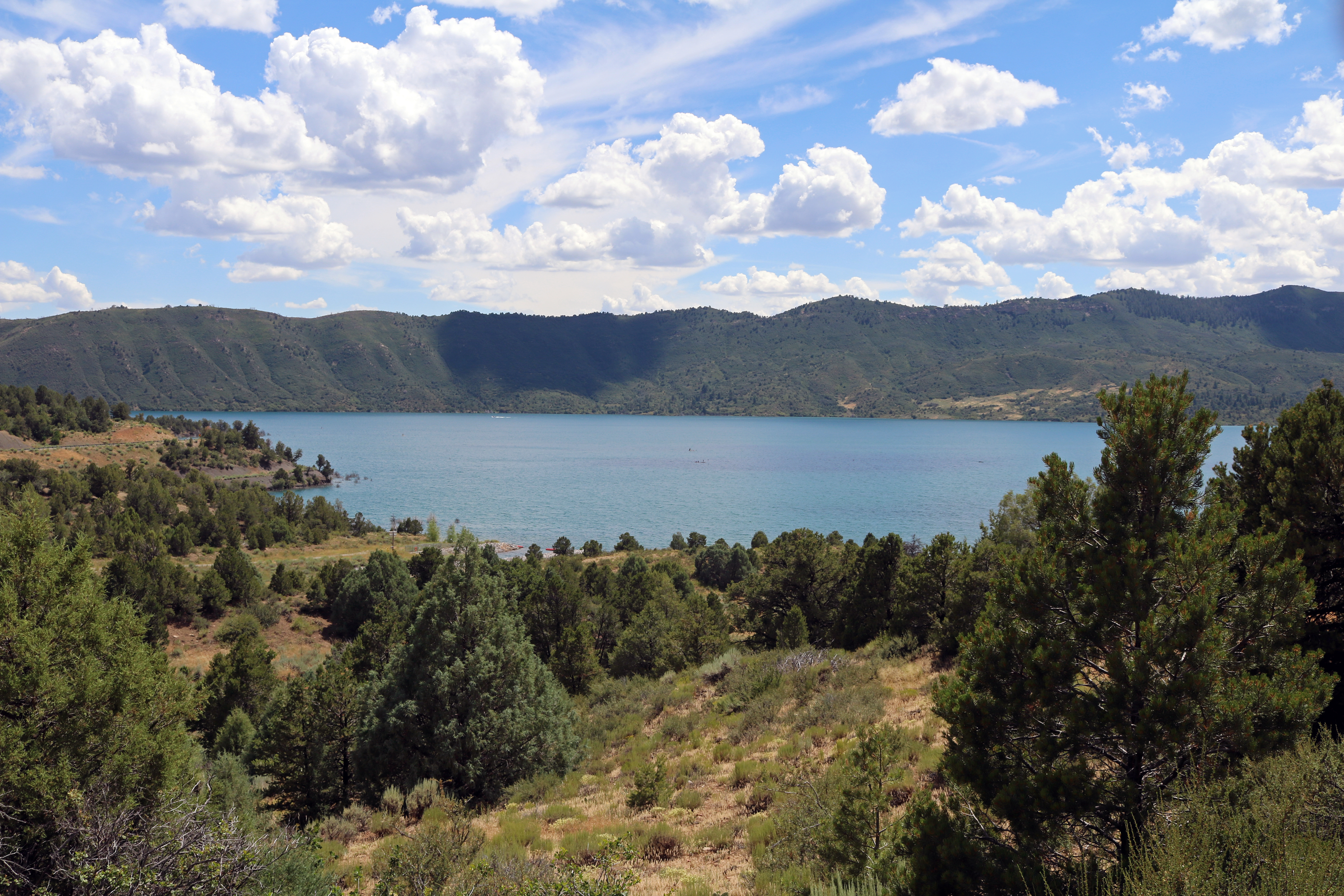
- The lake viewed from the overlook on County Road 210

- Location within Colorado Location within the United States
- Location: Colorado
- Coordinates: 37°13′29.99″N 107°54′53.16″W
- Type: reservoir
- Primary inflows: Durango Pumping Plant (Animas River)
- Primary outflows: Basin Creek (Outflow returns to the Animas River)
- Basin countries: United States
- Surface area: 1,490 acres (600 ha)
- Water volume: 120,000 acre-feet (150,000,000 m^{3})

Lake Nighthorse is a reservoir created by the 270 feet (82 m) high Ridges Basin Dam southwest of Durango in La Plata County Colorado. As part of the Animas-La Plata Water Project, Lake Nighthorse provides water storage for tribal and water right claim-holders along the Animas River.

== History ==
First authorized by the U.S. Congress on September 30, 1968 (Public Law 90-537), the Animas-La Plata Water Project, as it came to be known, experienced a few decades of delays due in part to political concerns, farming claims, environmental challenges, cost overruns and government funding issues. A breakthrough to the delays came with the Colorado Ute Settlement Act Amendments in December 2000 (Public Law 106–554).

The Bureau of Reclamation began construction in 2003, with the reservoir filling to capacity on June 29, 2011, at a total cost of $500 million. Lake Nighthorse is named in honor of former United States Senator Ben Nighthorse Campbell, R-Colo.

Lake Nighthorse covers Sacred Ridge, a former multiple habitation archaeological site. Excavations at the Sacred Ridge site (c. 800 CE) documented evidence of a large-scale episode of lethal violence and perimortem mutilation.

== Recreation and marinas ==
The lake is open as of April 1, 2018, for recreation, fishing and boating. It has been stocked with kokanee salmon, rainbow trout and brown trout.
