= Weston Pass Fire =

2018 wildfire in Colorado, United States

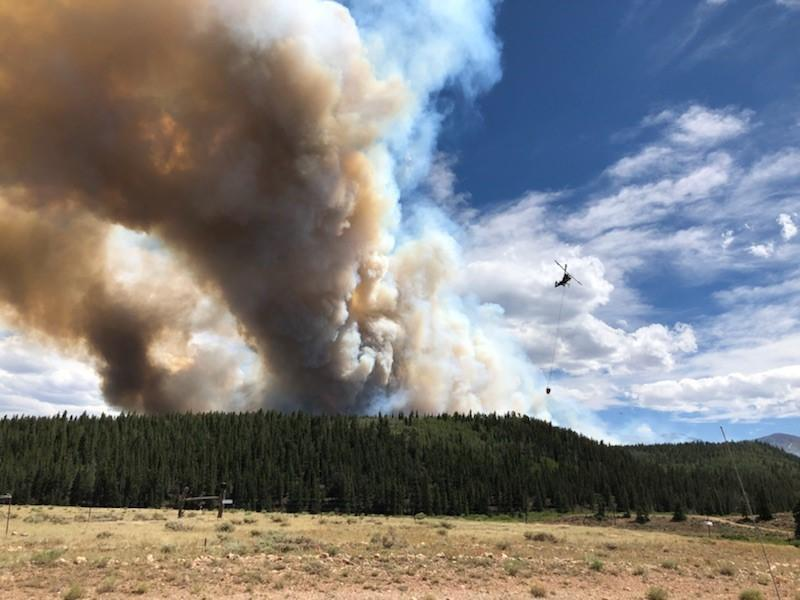
- A helicopter makes a water drop on the Weston Pass Fire on June 30, 2018.
- Date: June 28, 2018 – July 14, 2018
- Location: Granite, Colorado, Park County

Statistics
- Burned area: 13,023 acres (53 km^{2})

The Weston Pass Fire was a wildfire that burned near Granite, Colorado in Park County. The fire burned a total of 13,023 acres. It was started by a lightning strike on the morning of June 28, 2018.

The fire grew substantially to about 11,000 acres by July 5. The containment of the fire increased from 10% on July 5 to 93% on July 14. The remaining fire burn area was inside the Buffalo Peaks Wilderness and was contained by using land features, bucket drops and deployment of ground firefighting resources directly to hotspots. The United States Forest Service warned residents that smoke from the spot fires could be visible throughout the rest of the summer.

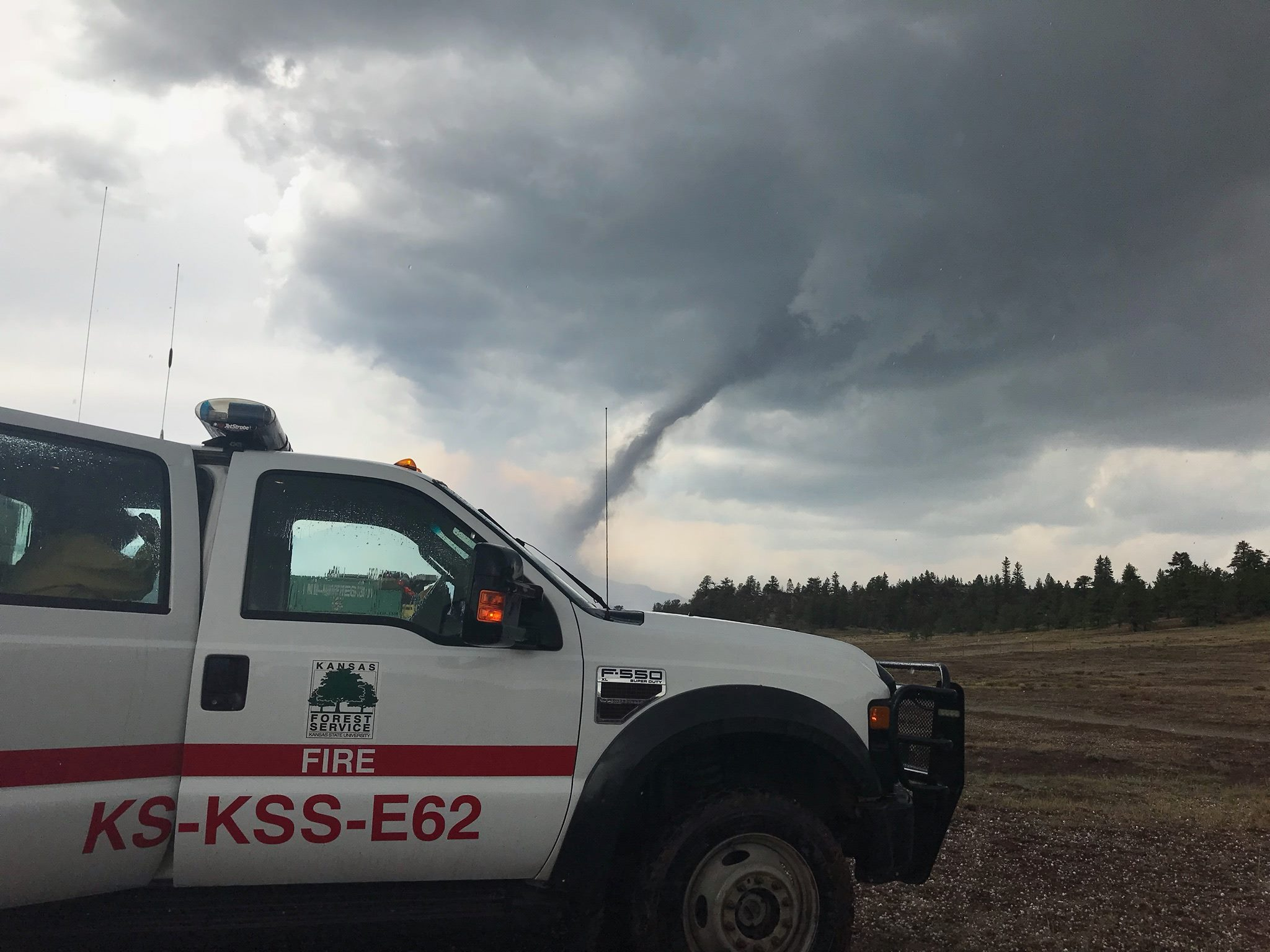
A tornado caused a Kansas Forest Service crew as well as other crews in the area to cease firefighting efforts.

== Incidents ==
On July 5, 2018, a rare high elevation tornado was reported on the edge of the fire. It forced firefighters off their line in fighting the fire.

== Closures ==
U.S. Highway 285 between Fairplay and Antero and Weston Pass Road (County Road 22) was closed as a result of the fire. It later reopened on July 7, 2018. The entire Buffalo Peaks Wilderness area was also closed after the fire entered the wilderness perimeter. As of July 22, the wilderness was mostly reopened outside of a section where hotspot fires were burning.

== Evacuations ==
Evacuations were issued for the Black Mountain and Thousand Peaks subdivisions as well as for the Campground of the Rockies Association. Fairplay Community Center and Woodland Park High School were established as evacuation locations for evacuees.

An evacuation point was established at the Fairplay Community Center, with livestock accommodations at the Fair Barn.
