= Animas River =

Tributary of the San Juan River in the US states of Colorado and New Mexico

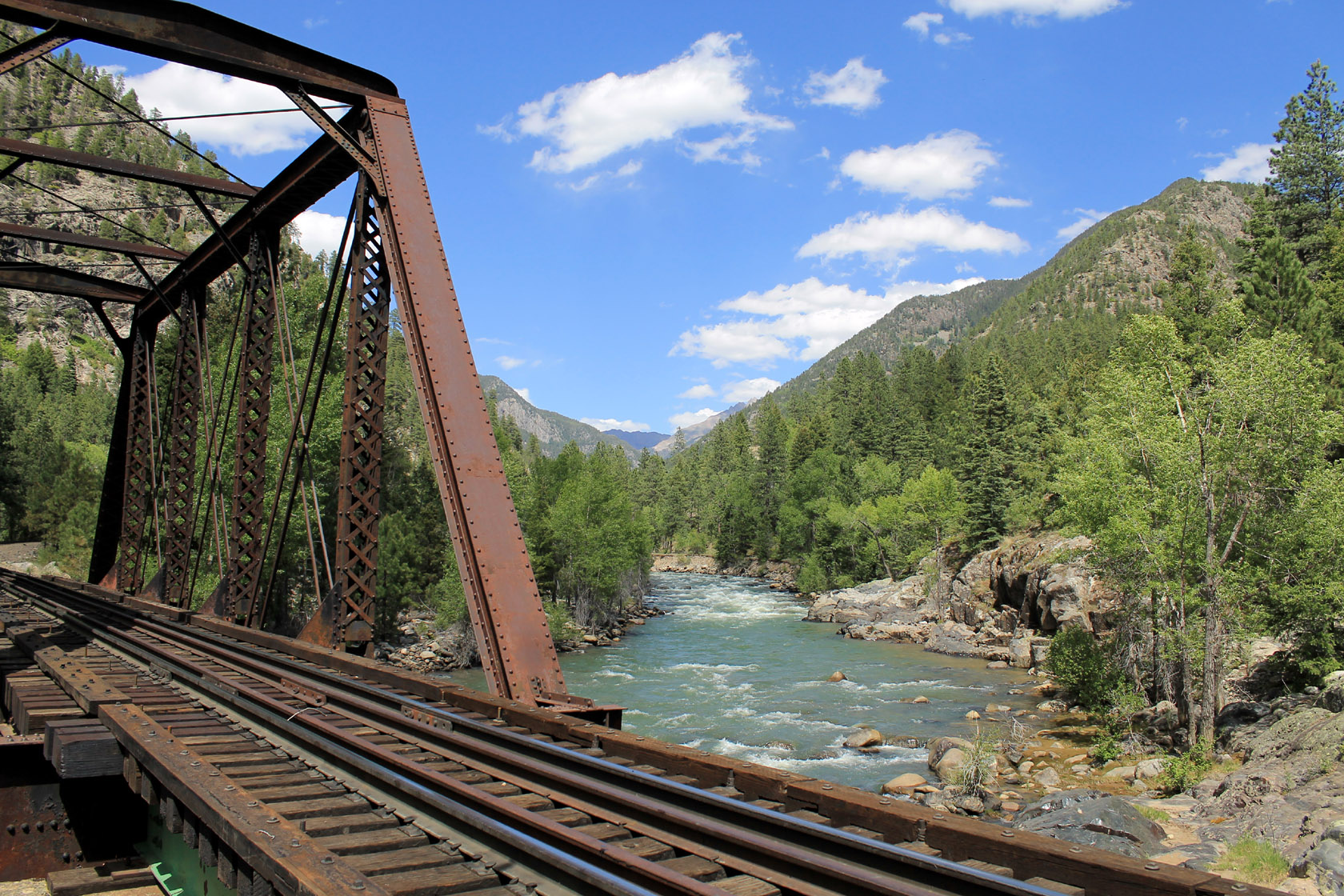
- Animas River at Durango and Silverton railroad crossing just north of confluence with Lime Creek

- Location of the mouth of the Animas River in New Mexico

Location
- Country: United States
- State: Colorado, New Mexico

Physical characteristics
- Source: Confluence of North Fork Animas River and West Fork Animas River; 37°55′53″N 107°34′10″W
  - location: San Juan County, CO
  - coordinates: 37°55′53″N 107°34′10″W
- Mouth: Confluence with San Juan
  - location: San Juan County, NM
  - coordinates: 36°42′50″N 108°13′18″W
  - elevation: 5,239 ft (1,597 m)
- Length: 126 mi (203 km)

Basin features
- Tributaries
  - left: Cunningham Creek, Elk Creek, Needle Creek, Canyon Creek, Florida River
  - right: Mineral Creek, Mineral Creek, Lime Creek, Hermosa Creek, Junction Creek, Lightner Creek

Animas River (Spanish: Río de las Ánimas, Navajo: Kinteeldéé' 'Nlíní, Ute-Southern Paiute: Sagwavanukwiti) is a 126-mile-long (203 km) river in the western United States, a tributary of the San Juan River, part of the Colorado River System.

The river has experienced numerous catastrophes due to the mining nearby, the largest being the 2015 Gold King Mine waste water spill.

== Name ==
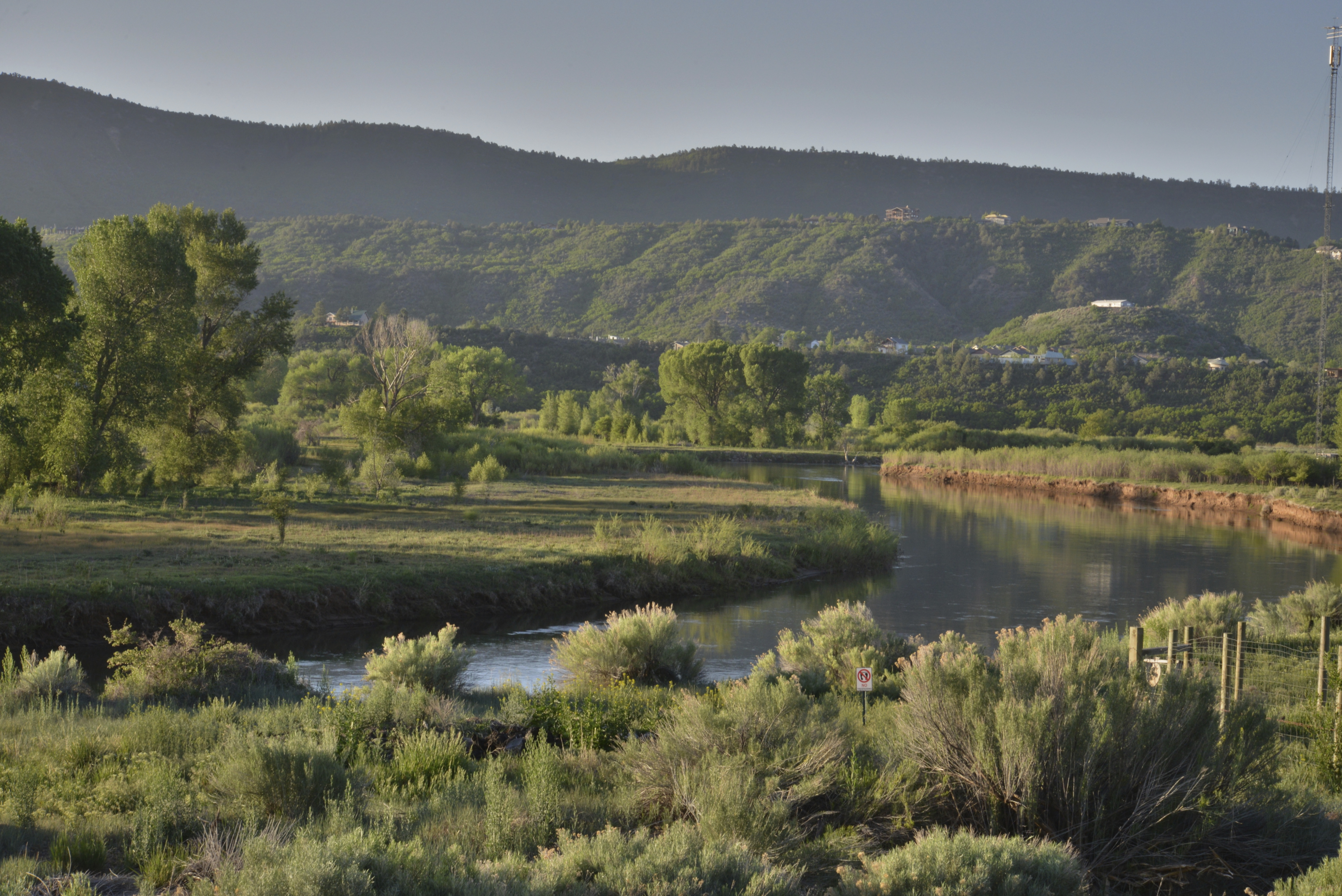
The river just north of downtown Durango

Spanish explorer Juan Maria de Rivera of Santa Fe recorded the name "Río de las Ánimas" (English: River of Souls) in 1765. The river later also came to be called "Río de las Ánimas Perdidas" (River of Lost Souls), perhaps commemorating those who died in the river. Some commentators have suggested that the origin of this river's name was derived of confusion with the Purgatoire River of southeastern Colorado.

== Watershed ==
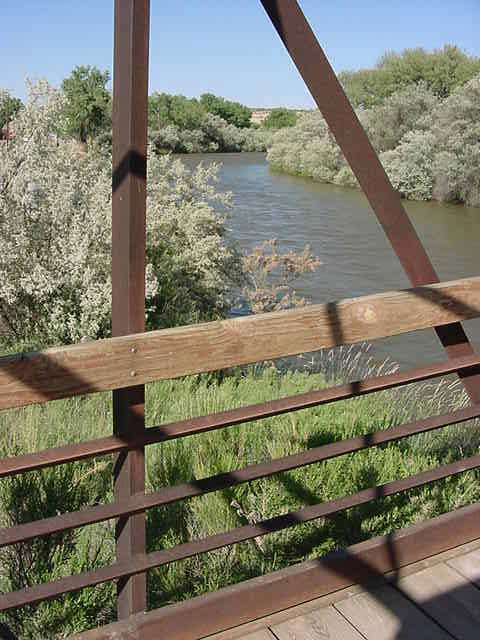
The Animas River from a foot bridge in Farmington

The Animas River rises high in San Juan Mountains of Colorado at the confluence of the West and North forks at the ghost town of Animas Forks and flows south past the ghost towns of Eureka and Howardsville. At Silverton, the river flows into the Animas Canyon. The Durango and Silverton Narrow gauge railroad follows the river through the canyon to Durango. From Durango the river flows south into New Mexico through the town of Aztec to its confluence with the San Juan River at Farmington. The only major tributary of the Animas River is the Florida River which confluences with the Animas just north of the Colorado–New Mexico border.

== Indigenous peoples ==
The ancestral Puebloan site of Aztec Ruins National Monument is situated along the river in the present day town of Aztec and for much of its course the river flows through native Ute and Navajo lands. The ruins contain the only fully reconstructed Anasazi Kiva, a ceremonial structure, in the US.

== Engineering and development ==
The Animas-La Plata Water Project was completed in 2015. The project pumps water over a low pass to fill a reservoir, Lake Nighthorse, in Ridges Basin to satisfy Southern Ute tribal water rights claims associated with the Colorado Ute Settlement Act amendments of 2000.

Numerous irrigation ditches serve the surrounding farmland along the river. The Durango Pumping Plant, completed in 2011, as part of the Animas-La Plata Water Project, draws an average annual of 57,100 acre-feet from the river, for storage in Lake Nighthorse.

A methane seep was reported on the river in Durango, Colorado in 2016.

== Wildlife and plants ==
The Animas serves as habitat to resident and migratory bald eagles which arrive in the winter months to take advantage of the ice-free river.

The Animas River is home to rainbow and brown trout, most of which originate from the Animas Trout fishery in Durango. The river is the native home to the mottled sculpin, a bottom-dweller that thrives in clean mountain streams.

== 2015 contaminants spill ==
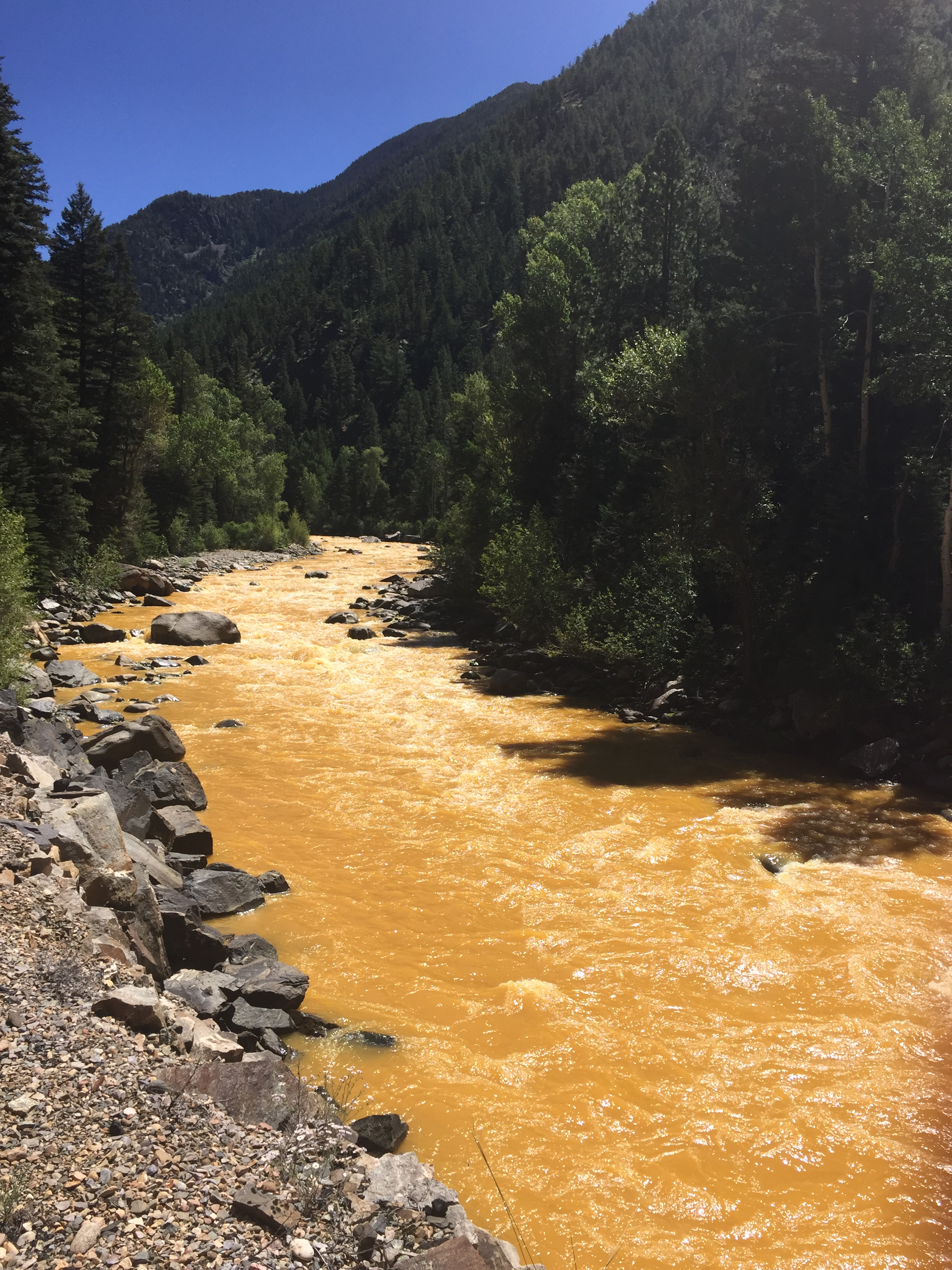
The Animas River between Silverton and Durango within 24 hours of the spill.

In August 2015, the La Plata County Sheriff's Office closed the river to the public after a crew working for the EPA released approximately 3 million gallons of mine waste into Cement Creek, a tributary of the Animas. The plug was accidentally removed while investigating a leak at the abandoned Gold King Mine. The mine was last active in the 1920s, but it had been leaking toxic water at a rate of 50 to 250 gallons a minute for years. The spill contained the toxic metals arsenic, cadmium, and lead, as well as the metals aluminum and copper. There may be other toxic heavy metals in the plume.

The spill changed the color of the river to orange, and the spill was described as "devastating" by Kim Stevens, the director of Environment Colorado, who said that businesses who rely on the river for profit might have to close down. The river's fish population might also be at risk due to the toxic waste that now runs through the river.

In February 2016, the Associated Press reported that the spill "dumped 880,000 pounds [400,000 kg] of metals" into the Animas River, and that "most of the metals settled into the riverbed." The metals considered are "cadmium, copper, lead, mercury, nickel, zinc, and possibly others."

During an Oversight Committee on September 15, 2015, it was made public that the EPA was aware of the possible blowout of waste from the mine into the river but chose to work around the problem rather than fix it.

== Recreation ==
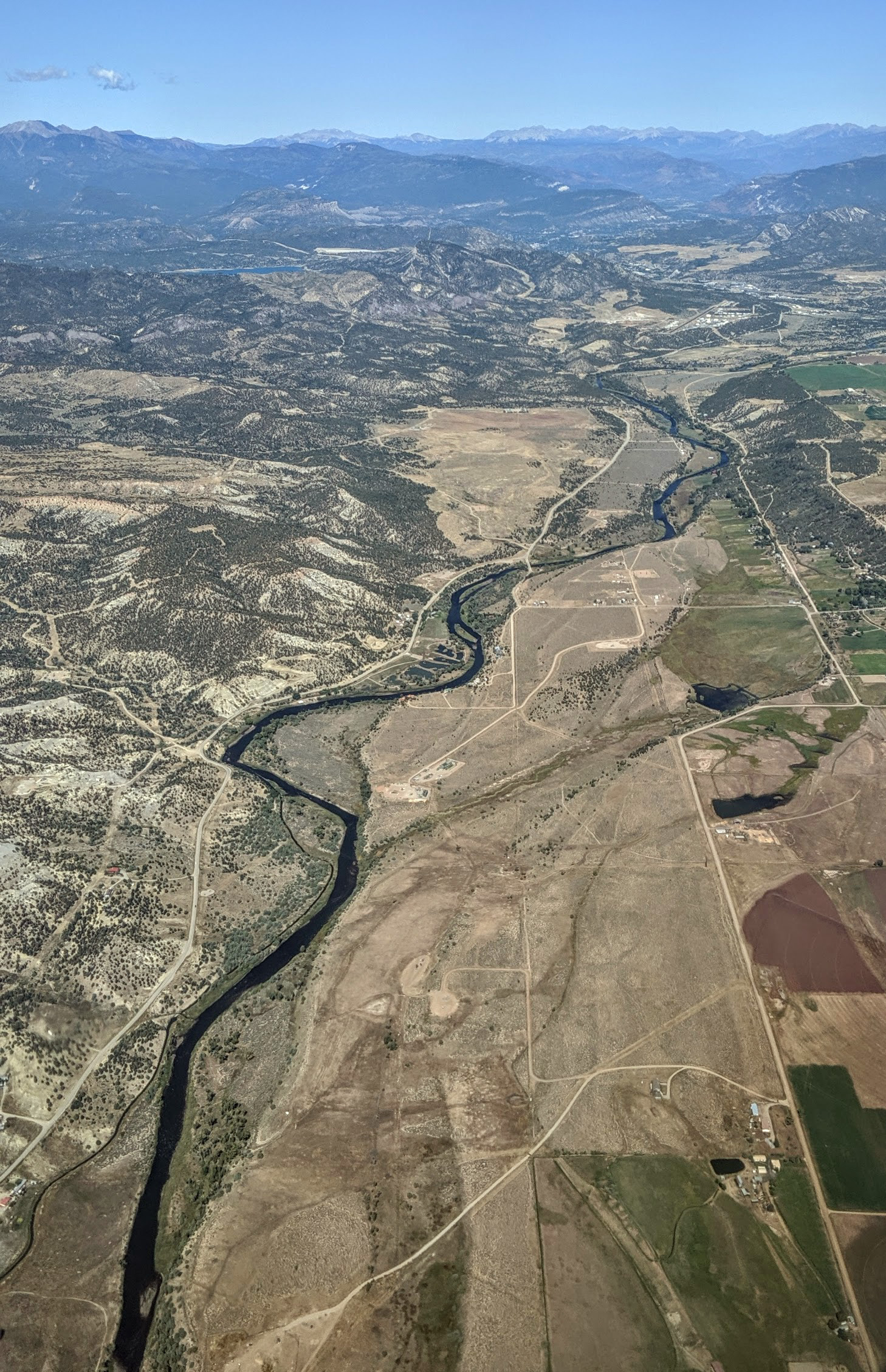
Aerial view of the Animas River coming out of Durango

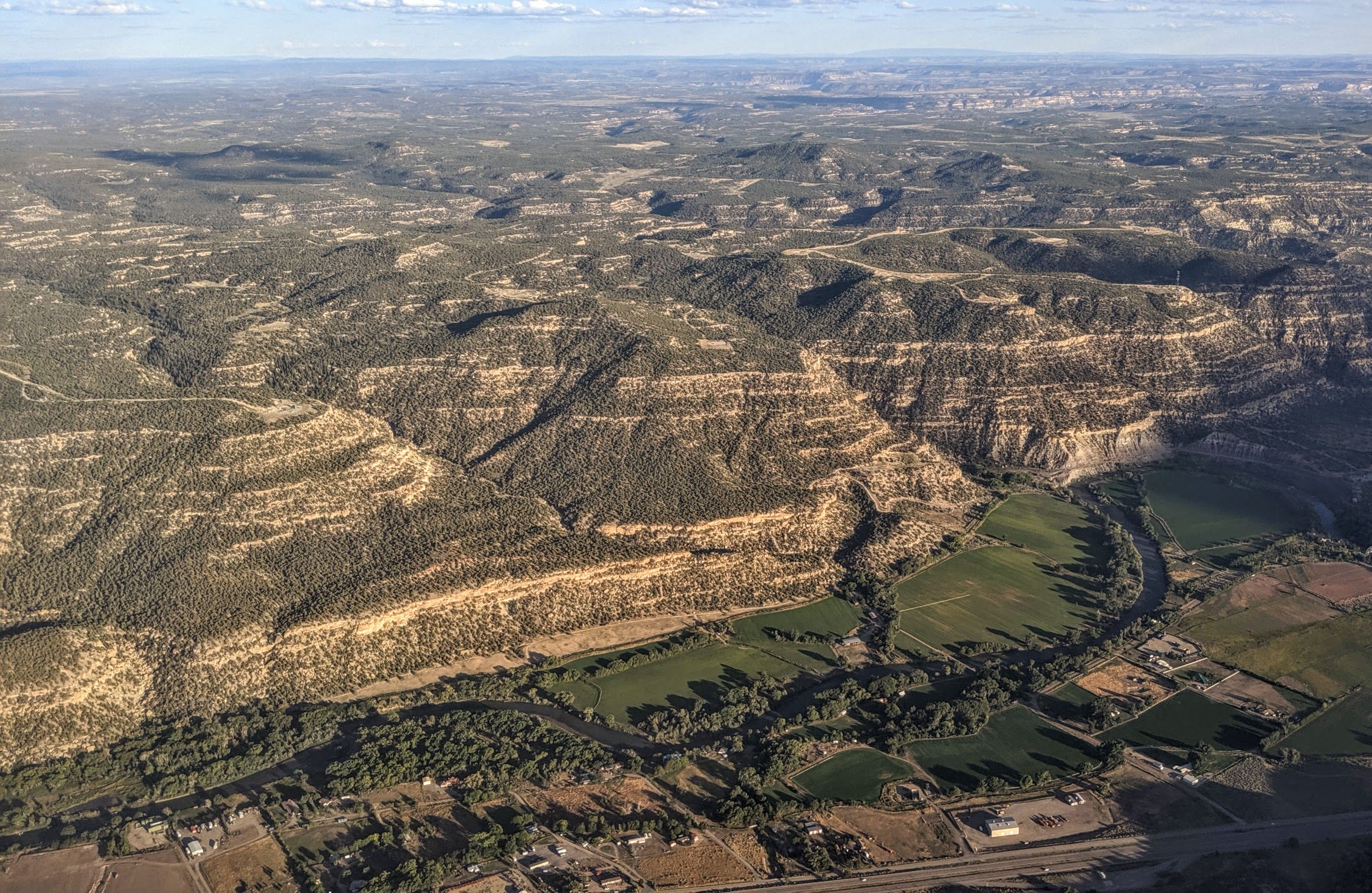
The Animas River between Cedar Hill, New Mexico, and the Colorado border

The Animas river is a major white water rafting attraction accounting for 8.9% of Colorado's commercial rafting market while annually generating 45,411 commercial user days and direct expenditures of $5,207,033 (2011 est).

The Animas is a freestone fishery well populated with rainbow, brown, Colorado River cutthroat, and brook trout. It is considered a gold medal fishery above Rivera Bridge Crossing in Colorado. Recreational fishing with artificial lures and flies on the Animas is available year-round due to moderate winter weather. Insect hatches of aquatic diptera and mayflies occur in the winter and spring months. In late spring, summer and through fall the Animas sees caddisfly and mayfly hatches as well as terrestrials such as grasshoppers. Animas trout average 12 to 16 inches (30 to 41 cm). Larger trout in the 17 to 22 inches (43 to 56 cm) are occasionally caught by anglers. Brown trout as large as 36 inches (91 cm) have been caught in the Animas.

In the town of Farmington, a 4-mile-long (6.4 km) trail that runs along the river from Berg Park to Animas Park was listed as a National Recreation Trail in 2011.

Tico Time, a resort/waterpark/concert venue opened in 2023, adding a plethora of activities to the Animas River waterfront.

== Media ==
Films have been shot with the Animas River taking center stage. In Butch Cassidy and the Sundance Kid, Robert Redford and Paul Newman leap to safety into the Animas River, not far from Durango. In the film City Slickers, the herd of cattle crosses the Animas River, followed by Billy Crystal rescuing a young calf from the river rapids.

The film "The Naked Spur" starring James Stewart and Janet Leigh was filmed in the area, with a central scene taking place on the Animas River.

== See also ==
- List of rivers of Colorado
- List of rivers of New Mexico
- List of tributaries of the Colorado River
- Animas-La Plata Water Project
- Lake Nighthorse
