= Lake Christine Fire =

2018 wildfire in Colorado

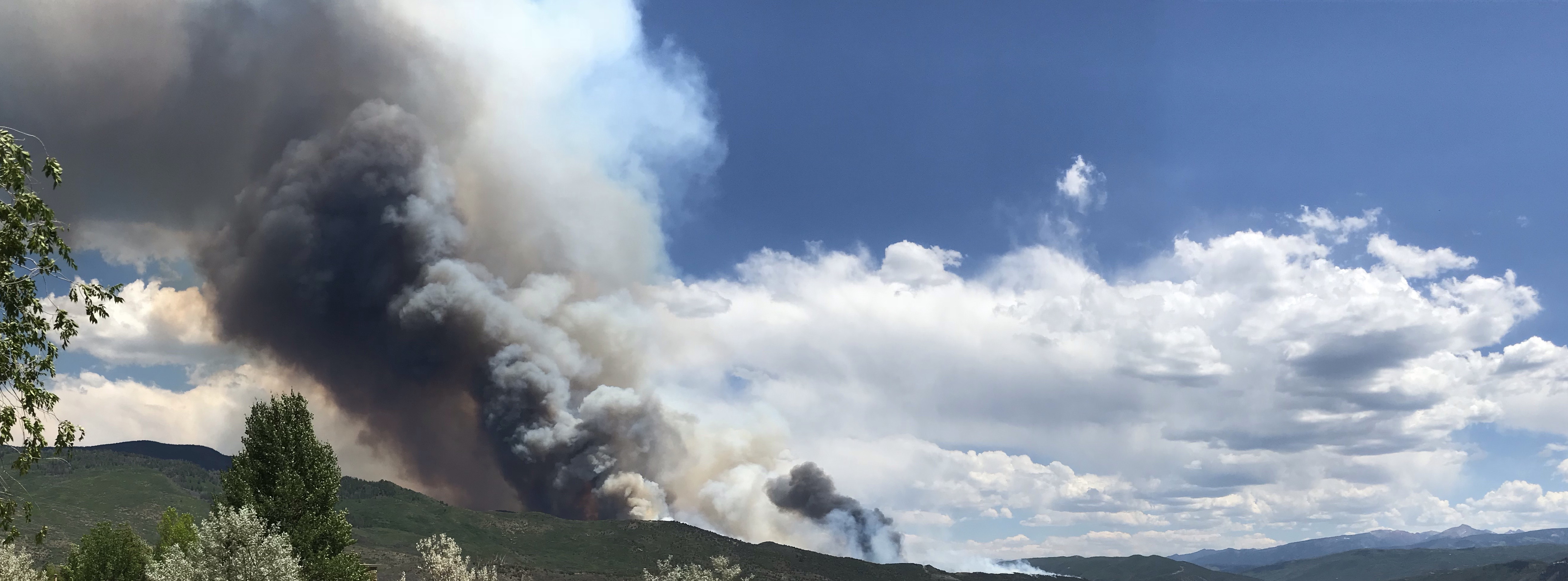
- Date: July 3, 2018 – September 4, 2018
- Location: Basalt and Carbondale, Eagle County, Colorado, United States
- Coordinates: 39°22′21″N 107°02′35″W

Statistics
- Burned area: 12,588 acres (51 km^{2})

Impacts
- Injuries: 1 Serious Injury -Firefighter, Volunteer
- Structures lost: Residential/Cabin
- Cost: $25 + Million USD

Ignition
- Cause: Arson/Tracer Round Ammunition
- Perpetrators: Richard Karl Miller and Allison Sarah Marcus

Map
- The fire’s location in western Colorado

The Lake Christine Fire was a wildfire that burned near Basalt and Carbondale, in Eagle County, Colorado, United States. The fire was the result of an act of criminal arson. It started on July 3, 2018, and was later downgraded to a Burned Area Response on September 4, 2018, after 13 weeks. It destroyed a total of 12,588 wilderness acres on Basalt Mountain and seriously injured a volunteer firefighter. The Lake Christine fire also destroyed the home of a long-time volunteer firefighter who was battling the blaze in response to his call of duty on the evening of July 4. Several other structures were also destroyed.

== Incidents ==
The fire started just before 6:00pm on July 3, 2018, at the Basalt Shooting Range. Criminality for the fire was officially assigned to Richard Karl Miller, 23, and Allison Sarah Marcus, 22, of the Maryland/Washington DC area. They were in a group of people using tracer rounds at the rifle area of the range, located on the south side of the shooting area. Fire personnel who reported from the scene noted that the impact site of the rounds was on a hillside adjacent to the gun range, far outside of the targeted shooting area. The Roaring Fork Valley, including Basalt, had been under Stage 2 Fire Ban Restrictions for several weeks, and was experiencing serious drought conditions when the fire ignited.

Marcus and Miller were contacted by law enforcement at the gun range on July 3 along with the other members of their party, but were not arrested. In mid-July, the District Attorney's office indicated that the suspects could not be located. The pair were reported to have fled the State of Colorado. Public contacts to law enforcement helped to locate the suspects in-hiding and they were arrested in the early morning hours of July 15, 2018, outside of a home in Carbondale by the Basalt Police Department.

Miller and Marcus were offered a deal by prosecutors to plea guilty to a single misdemeanor charge each. Eight felony charges were eliminated by the prosecution team.

The gunmen originally faced multiple 4th degree felony arson charges, but all felony charges were later dropped.

Miller and Marcus were sentenced to a work release program, community service, and received a total $100,000 fine for restitution to the group of victims.

Estimates put the firefighting costs for government agencies in the range of $30,000,000 USD.

Fire crews from Arizona and parts of the Pacific Northwest arrived in the Roaring Fork Valley in the days after the fire began to assist local crews and air support personnel. Nearly 1500 fire personnel were sent from thirty-nine states in the Union to Colorado to assist with the fire. Helicopters worked for several days from local water sources and retardant pickup stations to battle the blaze from the airspace.

Thousands of residents of the Carbondale, El Jebel, Basalt and Fryingpan Valley areas were evacuated from their homes on July 4, 2018. An approaching storm from the East pushed heavy winds but provided no rainfall for the fire suppression effort. Wind gusts up to 50 miles per hour gave fuel to the fire and spread it rapidly into areas of Missouri Heights and El Jebel. Local residents assisted ground personnel in battling the blaze. Flames reached heights to more than 100 feet in the air.

On September 4, 2018, the fire was downgraded to a Burned Area Response.

The fire destroyed the homes of five separate families in El Jebel and destroyed a historic cabin on Basalt Mountain. The large landscape burn scar on Basalt Mountain threatened to produce mudslide activity nearby the community of El Jebel during the Fall of 2018 and Spring of 2019. A community meeting was held in March 2019 to inform local residents of future dangers within the burn scar area and the significant chances for mudslide activity. Some areas along the eastern edge of the fire in Basalt were impacted by mudslide and debris activity in August 2019.

Colorado Parks and Wildlife specifically outlaws flammable tracer round ammunition at the Lake Christine Wildlife Shooting Range in Basalt, and this provision was in effect on July 3 on posted signage at the range.

== Closures ==
The Lake Christine Gun Range was fully-operational under the Colorado Department of Wildlife Agency's District 8 Manager when the fire broke-out. CPW Officer Perry Will was the manager responsible for maintaining the gun range. Although the risk for fire at the range was extremely high with Stage II fire danger conditions en effect during the early parts of July 2018, the gun range remained open.

Upper Cattle Creek in the southbound direction and Kelly Lake Road were closed during the fire.

== Politics ==
After the fire, CPW Officer Perry Will appeared in a low-budget propaganda-style video made for the promotion of the gun range. The video was released in the Spring of 2019 on Facebook and YouTube outlets. Later in 2019, Will was appointed to the Colorado House of Representatives District 57. In campaigning, he attended rally events with pro-gun political candidate, Lauren Boebert, who is from nearby Rifle, Colorado. Boebert has appeared as an outspoken advocate for gun ownership since she attended a local town meeting in the nearby City of Aspen in the Fall of 2019.

The Eagle County Sheriff made headlines in conservative media outlets in the Spring of 2019 after voicing opposition to new gun laws being proposed for public safety in the Colorado Legislature.

== Evacuations ==
2,100 residents were evacuated in areas of Basalt, the Fryingpan River, Missouri Heights, and El Jebel.

Two evacuation centers were opened; one at Basalt High School in Basalt, and the other at the Roaring Fork High School in Carbondale. The Red Cross assisted in the evacuation efforts.

On July 20, 2018, the fire grew, causing pre evacuation orders to be put in place for Cedar Drive, Toner Creek, Seven Castles and Taylor Road.

== Gallery ==
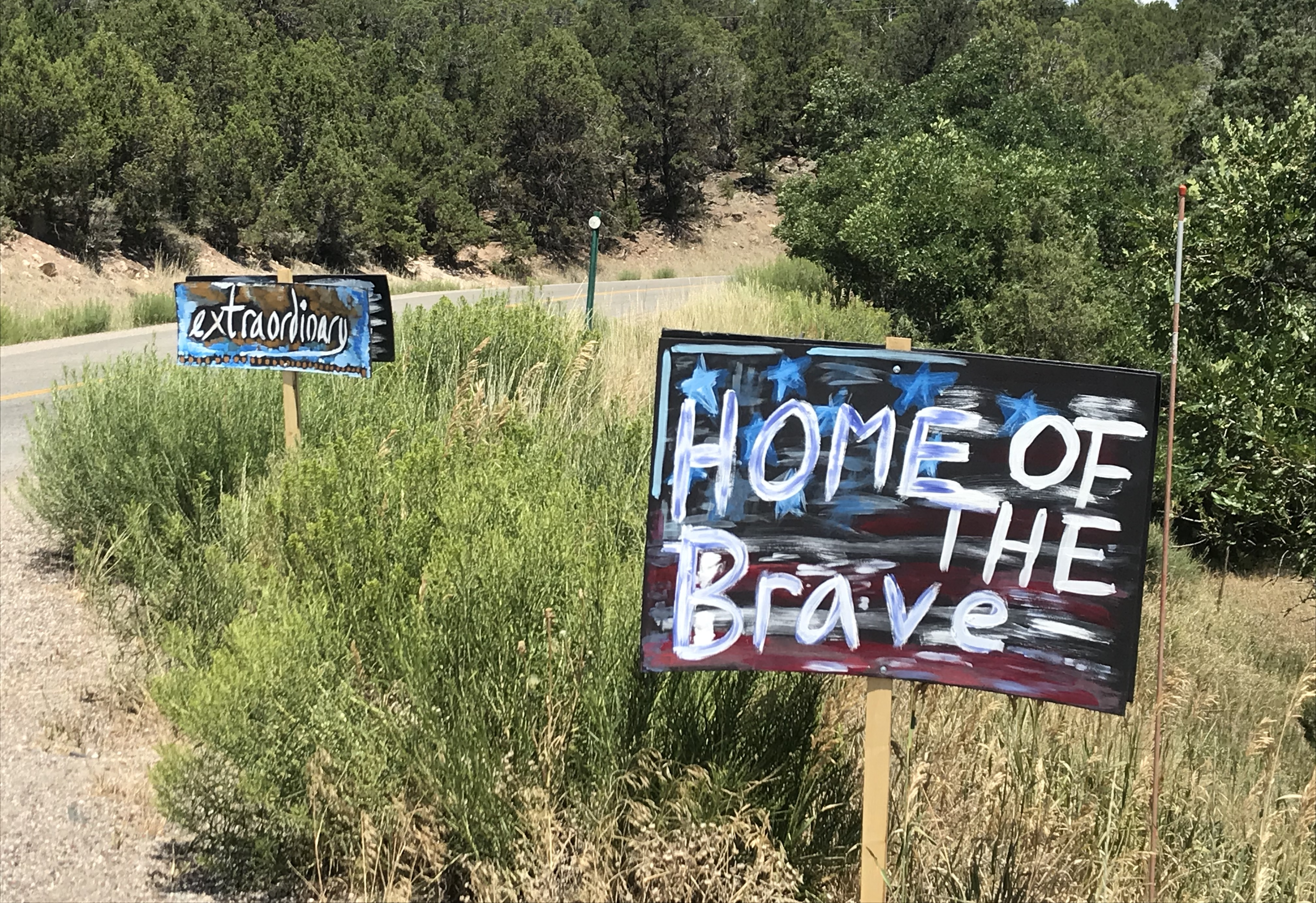

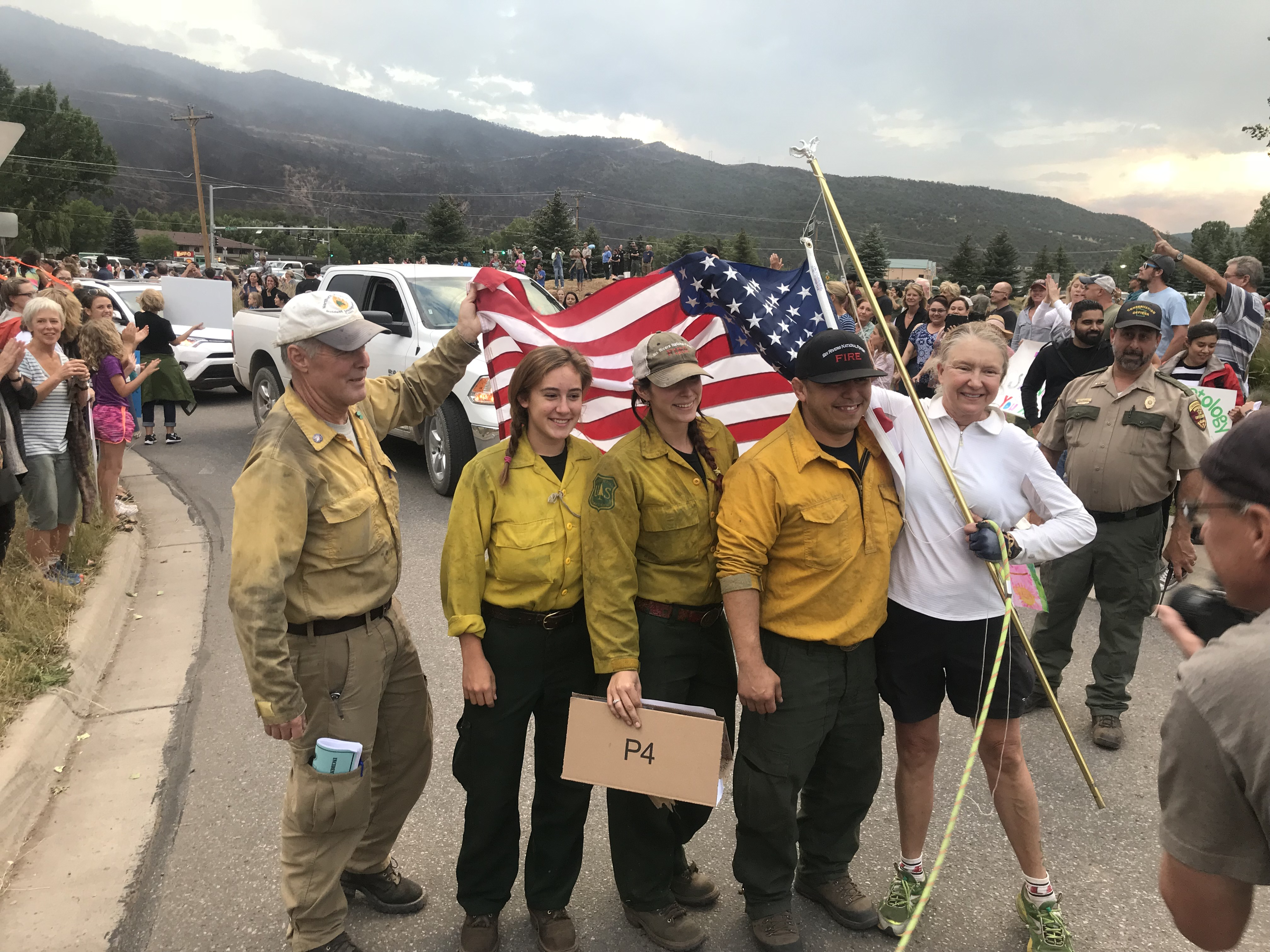

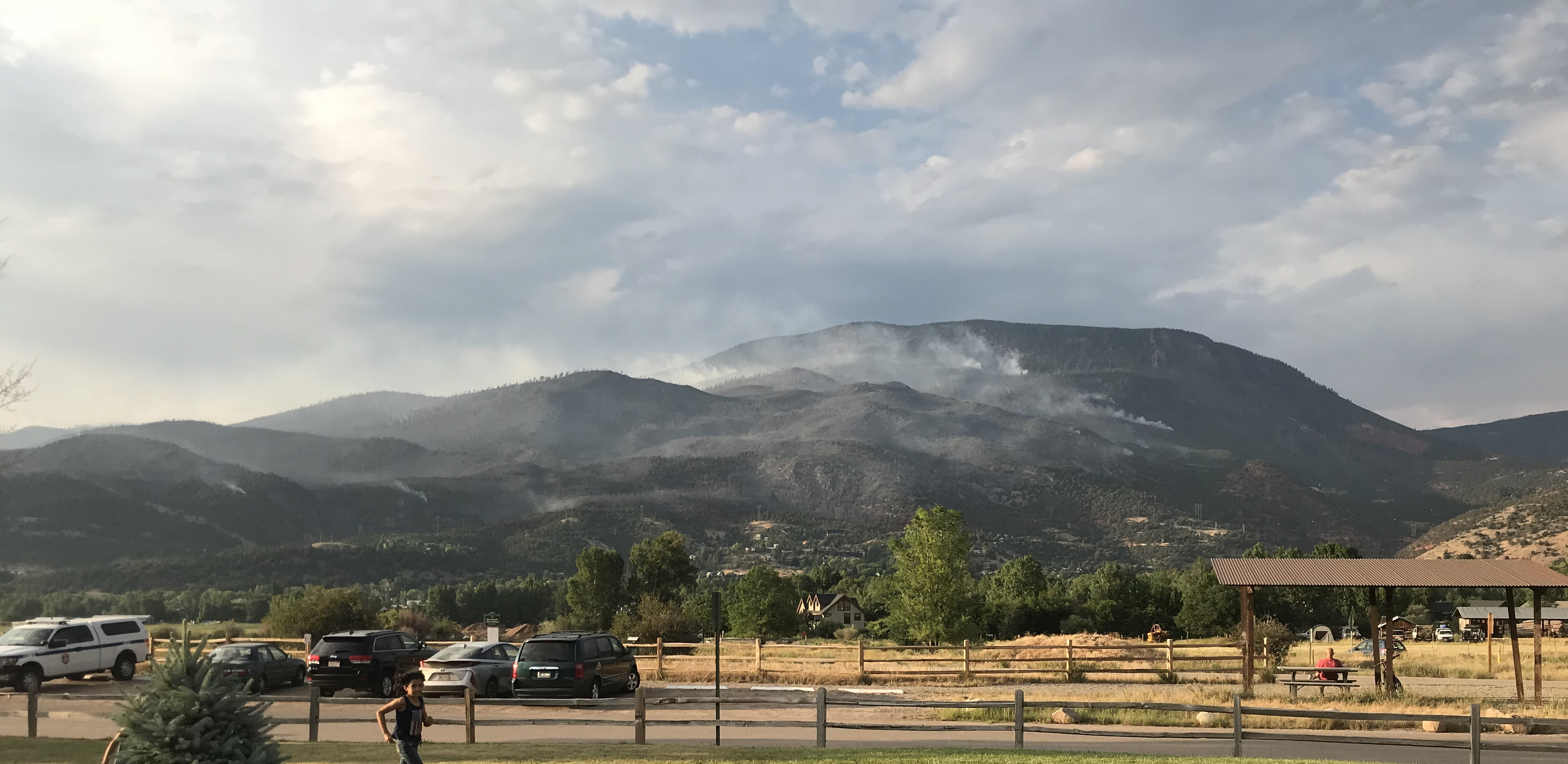
