= Aviation High School (California) =

Location
- 2025 Manhattan Beach Blvd. Redondo Beach, California 90278; 33.8874°N 118.3785°W

Information
- Type: Public
- Opened: 1957
- Closed: 1982
- School district: South Bay Union High School District
- Grades: 9–12
- Campus type: Suburban
- Colors: Black and Orange
- Mascot: The Falcon
- Newspaper: Jet Stream
- Yearbook: Talon

Aviation High School (Aviation, AHS, Avi-Hi) was a high school located in Redondo Beach, California, that was in operation from 1957 to 1982. The school occupied 40 acres at the northeast corner of Manhattan Beach Boulevard and Aviation Boulevard (which runs north to the Los Angeles International Airport). Their athletic teams were known as the Falcons and the school colors were black and orange.

Because of mushrooming growth in the South Bay, Los Angeles beach communities (Manhattan Beach, Redondo Beach, and Hermosa Beach), the school was built in 1957 (at a cost of 4 million dollars) by the then South Bay Union High School District which has today broken into the Redondo Beach Unified School District and the Manhattan Beach Unified School District; the district included two other high schools: Redondo Union High School and Mira Costa High School. Other proposed names for the school were Pilot George High, Will Rogers High, Kittyhawk High and—the second runner-up—Aileen S. Hammond High.

Aviation High School served students from both Redondo Beach and Manhattan Beach. At its construction, Aviation's facilities—largely single-story buildings radiating out from a central quad—were considered "ultra-modern". In the late 1960s a large auditorium was added to the campus.

== Early history ==
It initially had grades 9 and 10 upon the start of operations in 1957. The first enrollment count was 640. In 1974 it had its highest ever number of students, 2,300.

== School closure ==
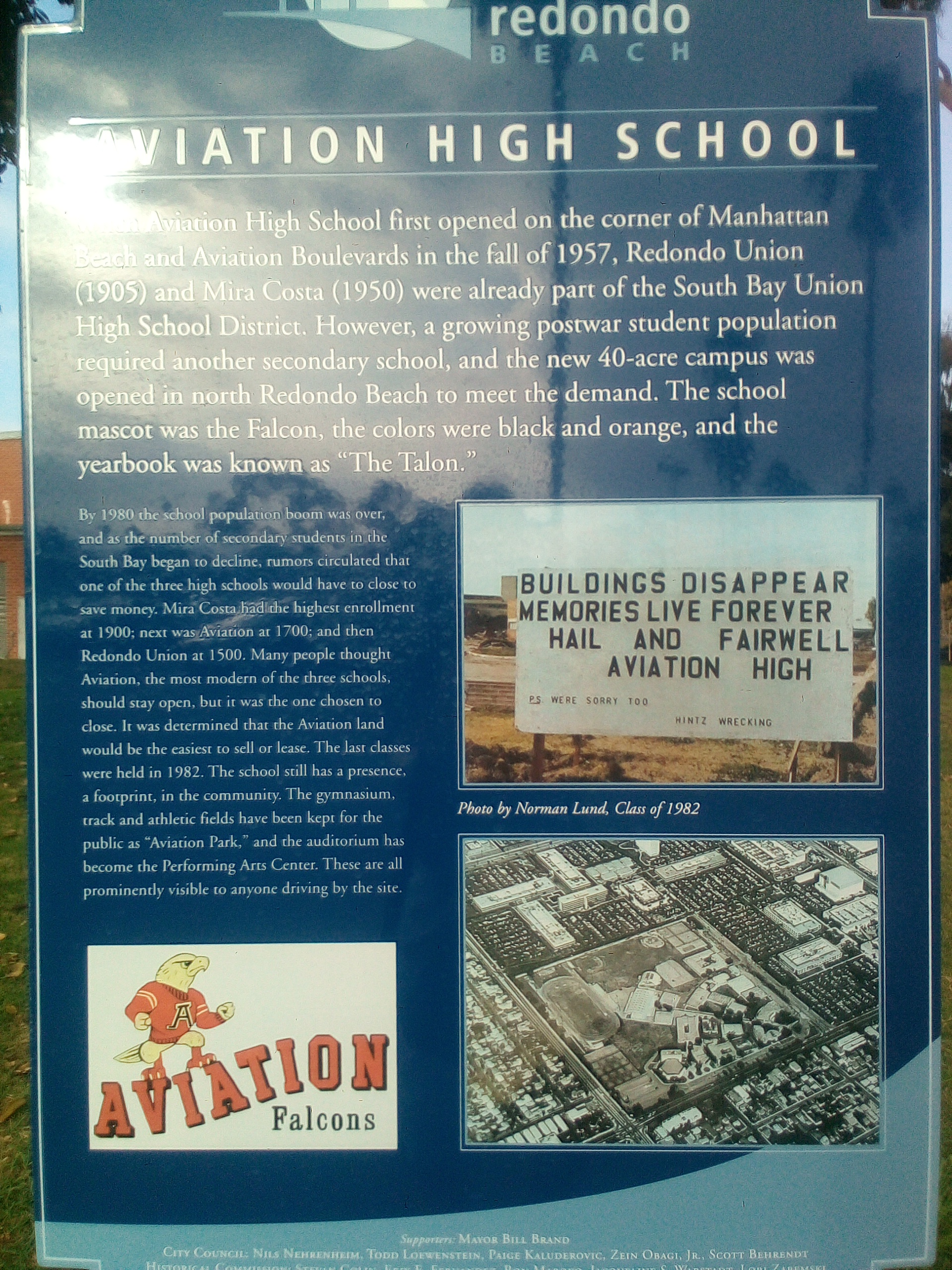
Sign posted by the city of Redondo Beach commemorating Aviation High.

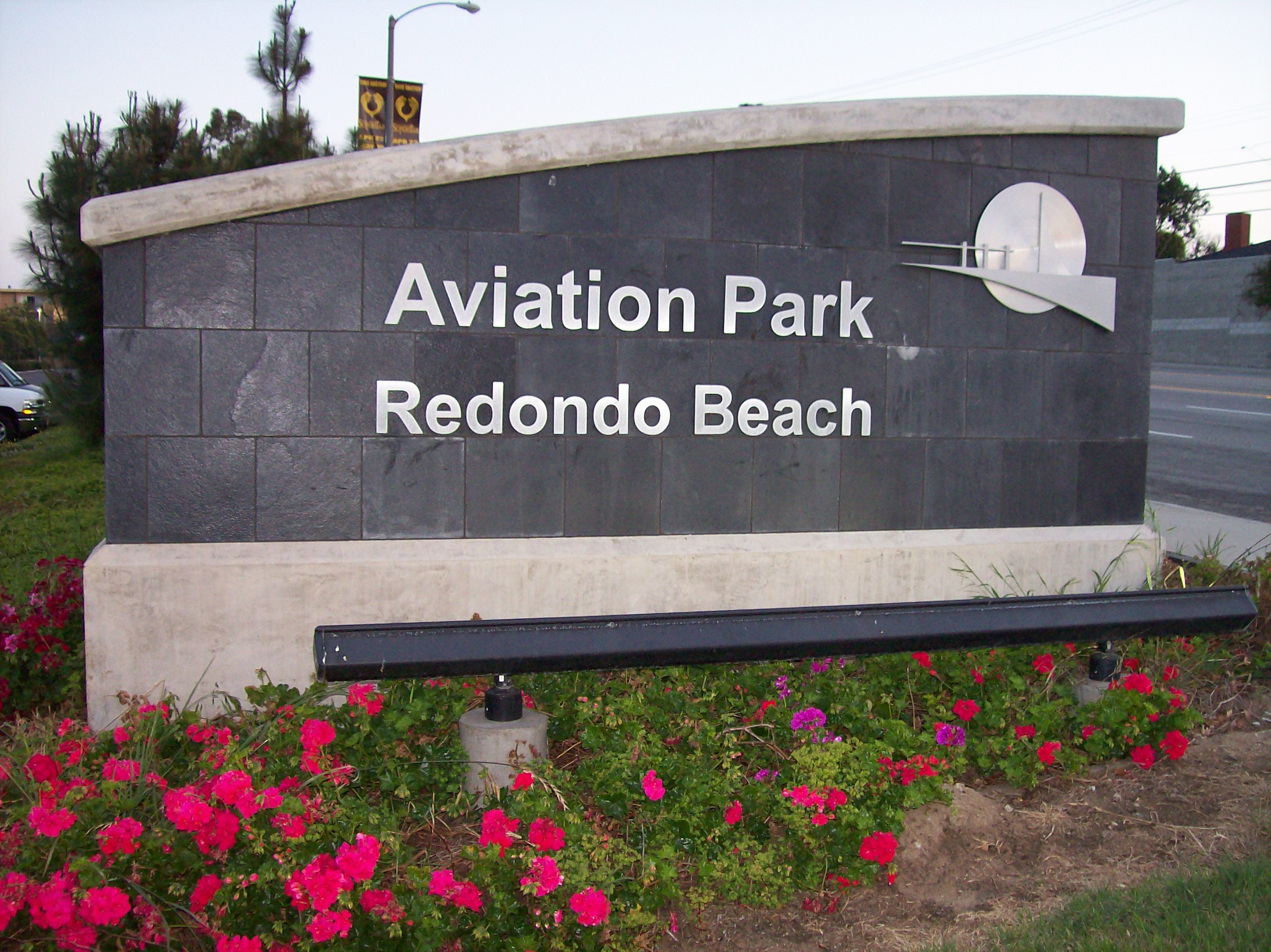
Aviation Park sign

Because of budgetary constraints in the early 1980s, in part due to California Proposition 13 (1978), the South Bay Union High School District decided in November 1981 to close one of its three area comprehensive high schools, but promised teachers and administrators that they would not lose their jobs. Savings were projected at $1 million in maintenance costs. After much deliberation (via a 21-member citizen's committee) and several public forums, the district decided in April 1982 to close Aviation. Hugh Cameron, the SBUHSD superintendent, stated that district decided that of the three high schools, it could sell or lease the land from Aviation High with the least amount of difficulty.

Many in the South Bay community saw this decision as unsound (closure would result in overcrowding of the two remaining schools and would not be a viable long-term strategy if district enrollment increased; in addition, Aviation had the newest facilities of the three area high schools. Some viewed the decision as based on area politics and geography (Redondo and Mira Costa High Schools were more centrally located and better anchored to their historic communities); some accused the decision of being in part motivated by the prospect of selling or leasing the facilities to Aviation High School's large corporate neighbor, the defense and credit-reporting company TRW. For some time after the school's closure, TRW did lease part of the facilities, including the gym, the track and field, and the auditorium; however, the city maintained the facilities.

There were 1,600 students in the final year, with 345 students in the final graduating class.

In September 1982, Dirk Broersma of The Redondo Reflex wrote that the SBUHSD administration felt that the transition to two high schools unexpectedly was "smooth" as no parties asked for recalling any politicians and officials, nor were any lawsuits filed.

In 1982, Aviation's non-graduating students were sent to Redondo Union High School and Mira Costa High School, depending on their residence location (to avoid overcrowding at Redondo High School, Mira Costa High School's resident limits were extended outside of Manhattan beach to incorporate part of Redondo Beach).

== Post-closure ==
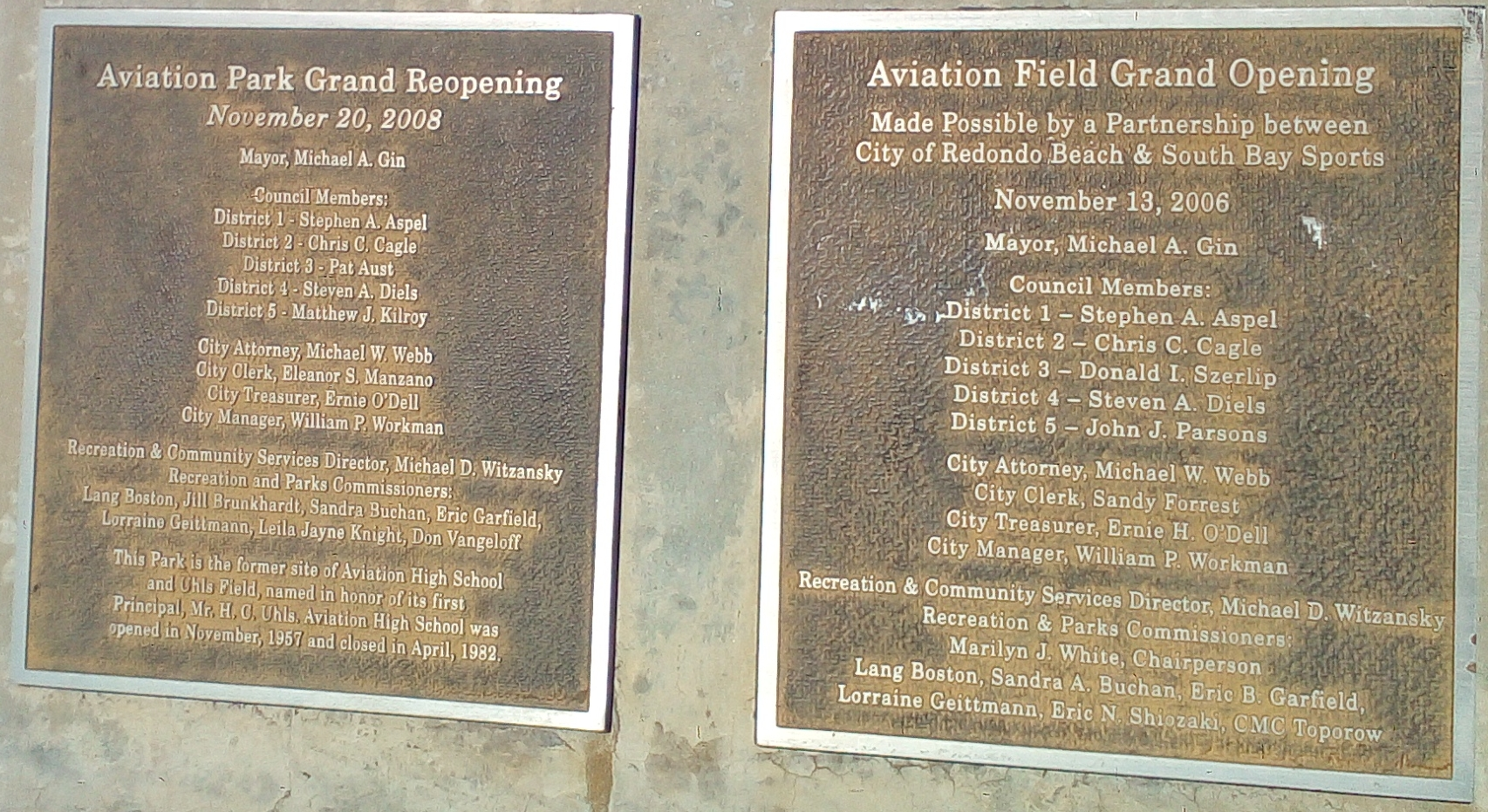
Plaques commemorating the field's 2006 opening & the park's 2008 reopening.

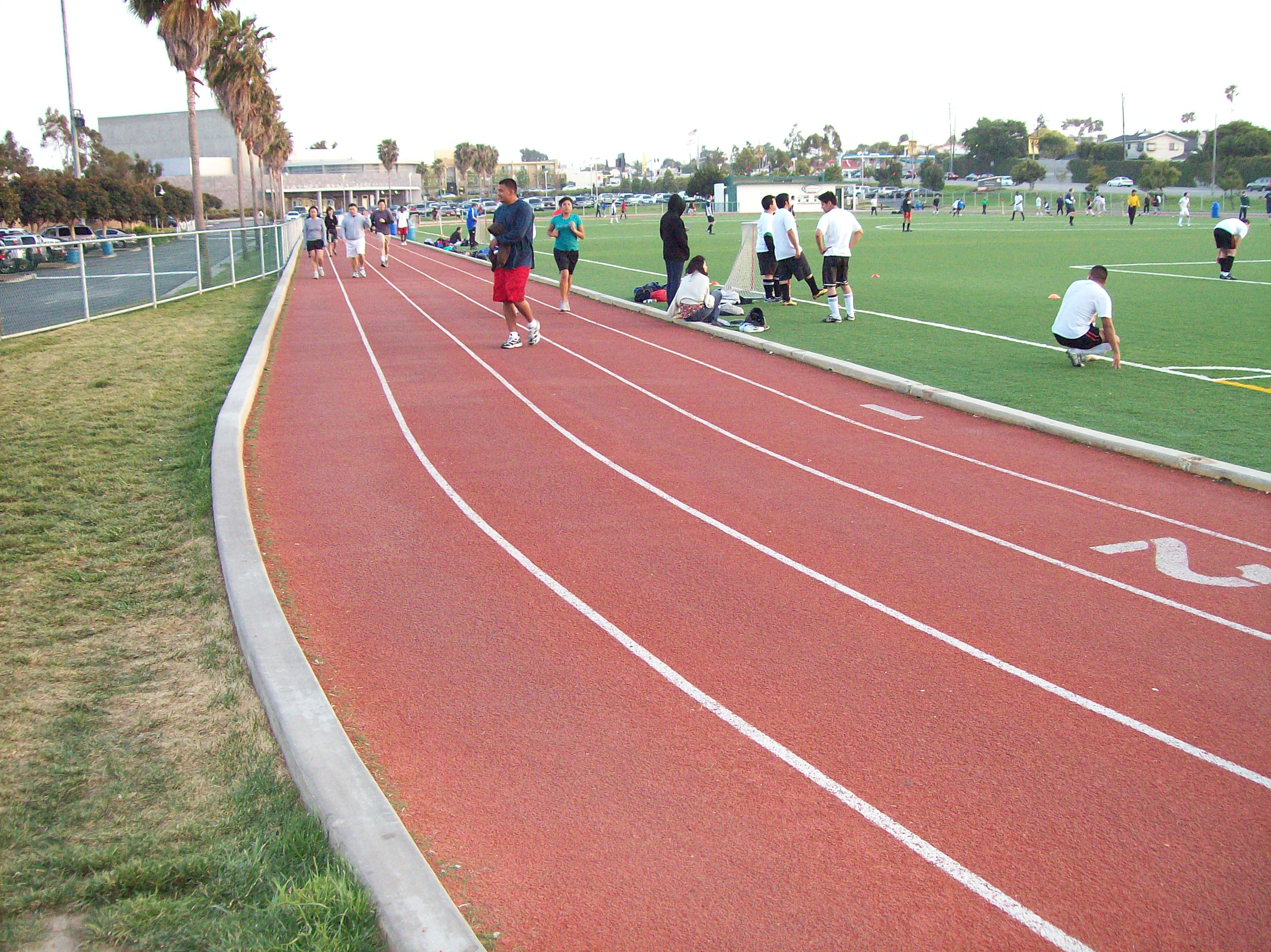
The track and soccer field at the former Aviation High School

In 1982 Archie Snow, a member of the Redondo Beach city council, argued that a civic center should be placed on the property.

In 1984 Overton, Moore & Associates began negotiating with the South Bay Union HSD over possibly buying portions of the school property. Circa 1984/1985 the school district agreed to sell over 24 acres (9.7 ha) of land to that company and began tearing down buildings in that section in 1985.

In summer 1984 Redondo Beach voters approved of making part of the high school property into a recreational area, so South Bay Union HSD decided to designate a separate 11.2 acres (4.5 ha) for that. In 1985 the city government agreed to lease 3-acre (1.2 ha) of the property.

Classrooms of the campus were demolished in 1982, but the theater, gymnasium and track and field were maintained. The site of the campus is now the 14-acre (5.7 ha) "Aviation Park", home to the Redondo Beach Performing Arts Center (with a 1457-seat theater, recently renovated), the Aviation Gymnasium (including a 12,000 sq ft (1,100 m²). and 6,300 sq ft (590 m²). gyms and a 1,221 sq ft (113 m²) dance room) and the Aviation Track & Field, where an artificial grass soccer field is now surrounded by a 440-yard, five-lane, all weather running track using the original curb.

In 2014, a mural depicting the school's mascot was erected in the remaining Aviation Gymnasium. The gym currently serves as the venue for the co-rec program "Tri City," a dance for middle school students within the Redondo Beach, Hermosa Beach, and Manhattan Beach school districts.

== Past principals ==
- Hob Ulhs (1957–1966)
- Ted Gossard (1966–1978)
- Bob Fish (1978–1982)

== Notable alumni ==
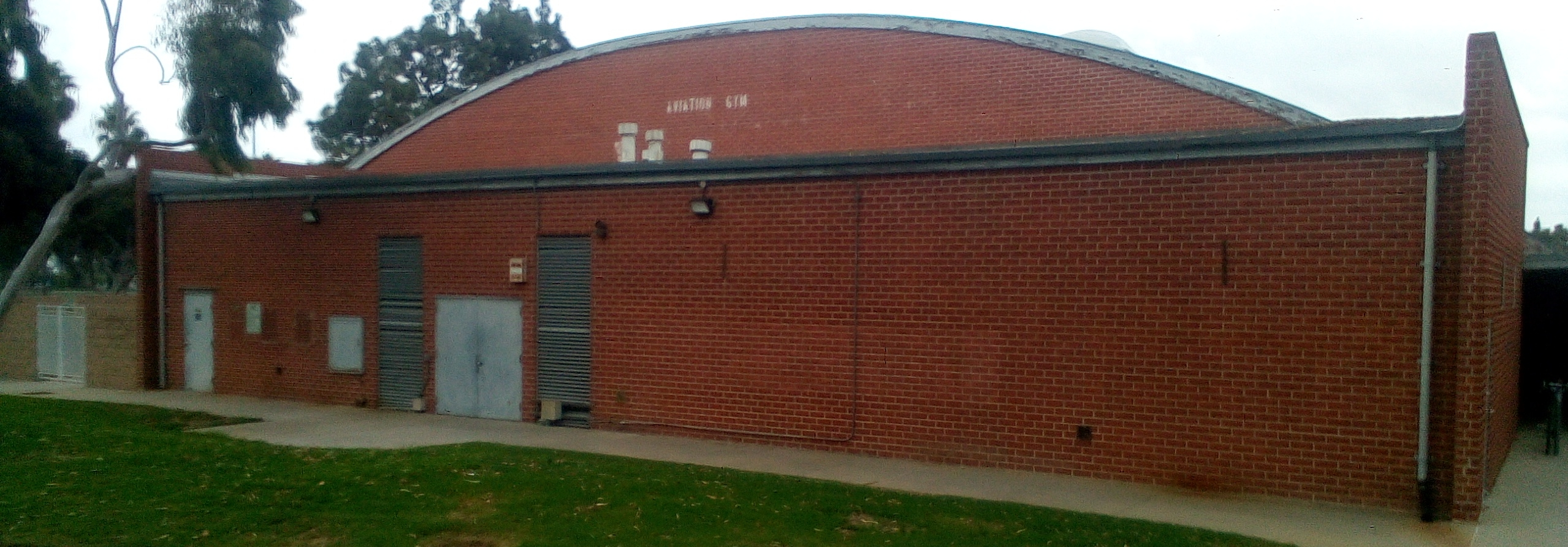
"Aviation Gym" stenciled on oldest-remaining bldg.

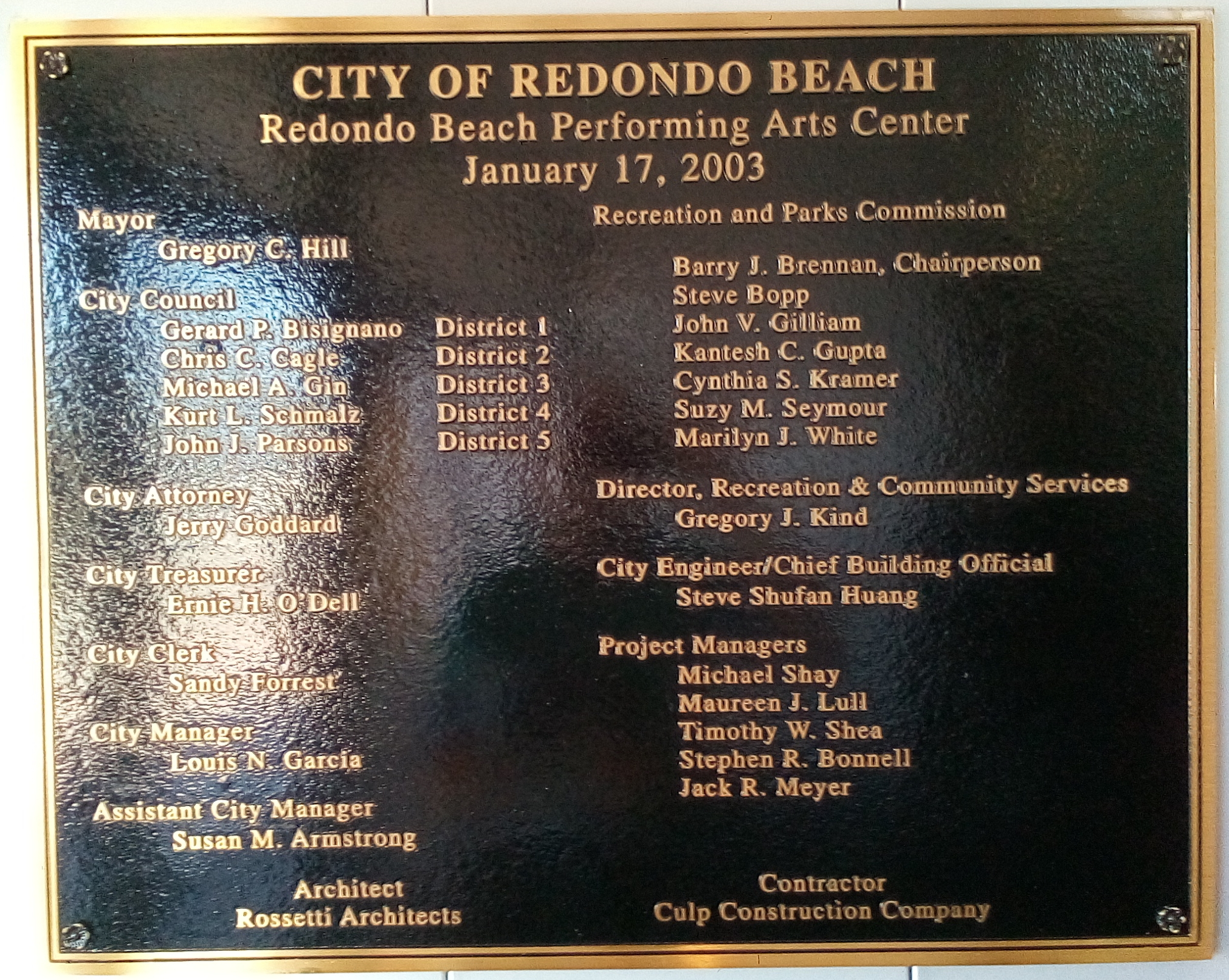
Plaque commemorating RBPAC's 2003 opening.

- Lydia Bree - Gymnast (Rhythmic) 1982 U.S. all-around champion and USA Gymnastics Athlete of the Year, alternate for the 1984 Olympic Team.
- Richard Breeden - chairman of U.S. Securities & Exchange Commission
- Bill Caudill - MLB pitcher
- Gilby Clarke - musician
- June Fairchild – actress
- Tim Green - NCAA Football Quarterback (USC) Pacific-10 Conference Champion, Rose Bowl MVP
- Tom Hintnaus — 1976, 1984 Olympic pole vaulter; Calvin Klein model
- Wes Jones - Architect, Director of Graduate Architecture Programs, USC
- Leah Langford - Software Engineer
- Allan McCollum — contemporary artist
- Larry Poindexter - Actor; S.W.A.T, American Ninja, General Hospital, JAG
- Neil Siegel - engineering and scientist
- Michele Tafoya - sportscaster
- David Vanole - soccer goalkeeper
- Paul Westphal - NCAA and NBA basketball coach
- Amanda Wyss - Actress; Fast Times at Ridgemont High, A Nightmare on Elm Street

== See also ==
- Aviation High School
- List of closed secondary schools in California
- Space Park
