= Valor Christian Academy =

Religious school in Redondo Beach, California, United States

Coordinates: 33.860615°N 118.372364°W

- 525 Earle Lane, Redondo Beach, California 90278, United States

Information
- Former name: Coast Christian School
- Type: Private, Christian
- Motto: Our Mission at Valor Christian Academy is to provide each student with an uncompromising Christian education devoted to academic excellence in a family-friendly, safe, and nurturing environment.
- Religious affiliations: Christian (Non-denominational, formerly Assemblies of God)
- Established: 1977
- Principal: Mrs. Natisha Echevarria
- Faculty: Approx. 30 full-time teachers
- Grades: Preschool (Infants–4 years), Transitional Kindergarten, Kindergarten–8
- Gender: Co-educational
- Enrollment: Approx. 300
- Student to teacher ratio: Approx. 14:1
- Language: English
- Campus size: Single campus
- Athletics: Basketball, Soccer, Volleyball
- Mascot: Eagle
- Accreditation: Western Association of Schools and Colleges (WASC), Association of Christian Schools International (ACSI)
- Tuition: $12,578 (highest grade, as of last reported data)
- Communities served: Redondo Beach, Hermosa Beach, Manhattan Beach, Torrance, Carson, Culver City, Gardena, El Segundo, Hawthorne, Inglewood, Lawndale, Los Angeles, Palos Verdes
- Website: valorchristianacademy.org

Valor Christian Academy (VCA) is a private, co-educational Christian school located in Redondo Beach, California, in the South Bay region of the Los Angeles metropolitan area. VCA enrolls infants through preschool, transitional kindergarten (TK), and kindergarten through eighth grade. Founded in 1977 as Coast Christian Schools, it was renamed Valor Christian Academy in 2012 and is affiliated with the Association of Christian Schools International (ACSI).

VCA is located at 525 Earle Lane, Redondo Beach, CA 90278, the former site of RBUSD's Fulton Elementary School. The school maintains one classroom per grade. As of the 2024–2025 school year, VCA enrolls approximately 100 preschoolers and 200 elementary and middle school students and is accredited by the Western Association of Schools and Colleges (WASC). Its mission is "to provide each student with an uncompromising Christian education devoted to academic excellence in a family-friendly, safe, and nurturing environment." The current principal is Natisha Echevarria

== History ==
=== Coast Christian ===
Pastor Wilbur Wacker and Calvary Church of the Coastlands established the school in 1977. The school initially served a small student body in Redondo Beach. In 1989, Coast Christian School in Redondo Beach, a precursor to Valor Christian Academy, secured a three-year lease extension for its Franklin Street Elementary School campus after a contentious city council debate, with supporters praising its academic and moral standards and opponents advocating for a public park, resulting in increased rent and shared facility access to fund park development.

As of 1992 it was named Coast Christian Schools (CCS), served grades Kindergarten through 12, and had two campuses in Redondo Beach, both leased from the Redondo Beach School District, and the school also maintained a campus in Harbor City. In 1999, the school system operated multiple campuses, mostly in Redondo Beach, except one in Torrance. The Prospect Campus in Redondo Beach served two-year-olds through Pre-Kindergarten, and the Inglewood Campus, also in Redondo Beach, catered to infants through PreKindergarten. The Elementary Campus in Redondo Beach educated Kindergarten through Grade 5 students, while the Middle School Campus in the same city covered Grades 6 through 8. The Accelerated Learning Center in Redondo Beach enrolled Grades 6 through 12, and another in Torrance served Grades 9 through 12.

=== Ambassador High bid for campus ===
In 2012 Ambassador High School, a Christian high school, tried to obtain the Valor Christian campus but there were issues with the Redondo Beach city council.

=== Valor Christian Academy ===
In that same year, the school rebranded as Valor Christian Academy, consolidating to a single campus in Redondo Beach. VCA gained WASC accreditation and ACSI membership, focusing on preschool through eighth grade, with approximately 100 preschoolers and 200 elementary/middle school students in 2025. Amy Thompson previously served as vice principal.

== Academics ==
VCA's curriculum integrates Christian principles. Expected School-Wide Learning Results (ESLRs) emphasize a Biblical worldview, communication, critical thinking, arts/humanities knowledge, and servant leadership. The school offers programs for infants/preschool (ages 0–3), TK (ages 4–5), and kindergarten through eighth grade, focusing on academics and character development.

=== Camps and activities ===
VCA hosted the 2025 Adventures in Writing Camp, offering students in grades 2 through 5 structured activities to develop their writing skills and foster enthusiasm for creative expression. The school provides several after-school programs. These include, for example, violin, American Sign Language, Novaes Jiu Jitsu, Bricks 4 Kidz STEM activities, chess, Mad Science experiments, and drawing classes.

=== STEAM ===
In 2019, fourth graders explored marine life at Redondo Beach's SEA Lab, sifting sand for crabs and collecting trash to learn ocean conservation.

Valor Christian Academy has hosted a Destination Science summer camp. In 2024, students took part in Next Up Aviation and Avalon Carver's "Explore the Sky: Your Gateway to Aviation" event. During the event, they had access to a mobile aviation classroom with flight simulators, STEAM workshops, and had the chance to experience actual small-plane discovery flights.

== Student body and culture ==
The School's Student Honor Council is made up of elected officers and class representatives.

=== Demographics ===
As of the 1991–1992 school year it had 390 students. Of its elementary students, 77% were White, 10% were Black, 8% were Asian, and 5% were Latino; and of the secondary students, 35% were Black, 30% were Anglo, 20% were Latino, and 15% were Asian. Jean Merl of the Los Angeles Times wrote that the secondary campus was "well-integrated" and that it "appears free of the racial tensions that have split some of the nearby public high schools." In June 2020, a student joined the "Pop the Bubble on Racism" protest, speaking out alongside other youth on issues of racism and diversity in the community.

=== Community ===
In 2014, The Mom2Mom Rummage Sale offered gently used children’s items, crafts, and home-based business products. In May 2017, Valor Christian Academy in Redondo Beach took part in Sharefest, a community service event where volunteers beautified local campuses through projects like painting, gardening, and clean-up efforts. In 2019, a 7th grader launched "The Sneaker Keeper," a shoe drive that collected over 1,000 pairs of gently used shoes. Donated through the Helping Hands 2 Haiti program, supported by the Links, Inc., the shoes were given to children in Les Cayes, Haiti.

=== Anti-bullying ===
In 2013, the school took steps to address bullying, including programs focused on education, awareness, and promoting a respectful and inclusive school environment.

== Athletics ==
Valor Eagles compete in the South Bay Athletic League (grades 5–8). The basketball team lost the league championship 41–56 to the First Lutheran Falcons in 2015.

== Awards and recognition ==
VCA has been voted Best Other Christian School (Non-Catholic) in the South Bay by the Daily Breeze and The Beach Reporter Readers' Choice Awards in 2021 and 2024, recognized for academic excellence and community involvement.
