= David Vanole =

American soccer player and coach

Personal information
- Full name: David Charles Vanole
- Date of birth: February 6, 1963
- Place of birth: Redondo Beach, California, United States
- Date of death: January 15, 2007 (aged 43)
- Height: 6 ft 4 in (1.93 m)
- Position: Goalkeeper

Youth career
- 1981–1985: UCLA

Senior career*
Years	Team	Apps	(Gls)
1986–1990	Los Angeles Heat		
1987–1988	Wichita Wings (indoor)	1	(0)
1988	San Jose Earthquakes		
1991	San Francisco Bay Blackhawks		

International career
1986–1990	United States	13	(0)

Managerial career
- 1995–2000: UCLA Bruins (assistant – men)
- 1995–1999: UCLA Bruins (assistant – women)
- 1997–1999: United States U20 (assistant)
- 2000: United States women (assistant)
- 2001–2003: Washington Freedom (assistant)
- 2003: D.C. United (assistant)
- 2004–2006: New England Revolution (assistant)
- * Club domestic league appearances and goals

David Charles "Dino" Vanole (February 6, 1963 – January 15, 2007) was an American soccer goalkeeper and coach. He spent his professional career in the Western Soccer Alliance and its successor league, the American Professional Soccer League. He also earned 14 caps with the U.S. national team including appearances at the 1988 Summer Olympics and was a squad member at the 1990 FIFA World Cup.

== Youth and college ==
He attended Aviation High School in Redondo Beach, California, where he was a three-sport letterman and a four-time All-Ocean League goalkeeper. Vanole played for UCLA from 1981 to 1985. As a junior, he backstopped UCLA to the NCAA Men's Soccer Championship. In that game, UCLA defeated American University in eight overtimes.

== Professional ==
After graduating from UCLA, Vanole played for the Los Angeles Heat from 1986 to 1990. In 1988, he also played for the San Jose Earthquakes. He played for the Wichita Wings during the 1987–1988 Major Indoor Soccer League season. In 1991, he finished his professional career with the San Francisco Bay Blackhawks which won the American Professional Soccer League championship that season.

== National team ==
Vanole earned his first cap with the national team in a February 5, 1986 0–0 tie with Canada. He would go on to appear a total of 18 times for the U.S. national team; however, only 14 are counted as full internationals. Vanole played 4 games with the U.S. Olympic team, including the 1988 Summer Olympics. While the U.S. national team at the time doubled as the U.S. Olympic in 1988, FIFA does not count Olympic matches as full internationals. Vanole was also on the U.S. team at the 1987 Pan American Games. Vanole started 4 of the 5 games played by the national team in 1986 and 1987. However, he shared duties with a string of other goalkeepers in 1988. On April 30, 1989, he made one of the biggest saves of his career: preserving a 1–0 U.S. victory against Costa Rica in a critical World Cup qualifier by saving a penalty kick in injury time. He had regained the position of the top U.S. goalkeeper, but was unable to control his weight and later that year he lost his starting position to Tony Meola. The clinching moment came in a U.S. game against Italian club A. S. Roma. While the U.S. won 4–3, Vanole's poor performance convinced Gansler to give the starting job to Meola.

In January, 1990, Vanole, under contract to the United States Soccer Federation, sat out the national team's training camp with a contract dispute. However, he was selected as the backup goalkeeper to Tony Meola at the 1990 FIFA World Cup. Here he gained worldwide attention, as he sat the bench during the matches and wore a cap with a Stars & Stripes-flag. Ultimately, however, he was ordered by coach Bob Gansler to stop wearing it, as Gansler felt the look was unprofessional and not in keeping with the image the U.S. team wished to present. Since Vanole did not play in this tournament, his last official cap came in 1989.

Vanole played on the Pro Beach Soccer tour for four years and was twice voted the best goalkeeper on the beach. He also played at the 1989 FIFA Futsal World Cup finals.

== Coaching career ==
Vanole spent six years as an assistant coach for goalkeepers for both the men and women's teams at UCLA; U.S. Women's Olympic and National Teams; and the Men's U-20 team. He also served as the goalkeeper coach for D.C. United of Major League Soccer (MLS) as well as the Washington Freedom of the Women's United Soccer Association (WUSA).

On May 25, 2000, Vanole became the goalkeeper coach for the United States women's national soccer team.

He was the goalkeeper coach for the New England Revolution of MLS from 2004 to 2006.

== Death ==
Vanole, who lived in New York City, died on January 15, 2007, in Salt Lake City of a heart attack during a family skiing vacation. He is survived by his wife, Kerry Tatlock, the NBA's senior director of global marketing partnerships, as well as by his mother, siblings, and large extended family.
