= Manhattan Beach Unified School District =

School district in California, United States

Address
- 325 S Peck Ave, Manhattan Beach, CA 90266 United States

District information
- Type: Unified School District
- Superintendent: Kim Linz, Ed.D.
- School board: Cathey Graves, Jennifer Fenton, Kristen Weinstein, Christina Shivpuri

Students and staff
- Students: 5,852
- Staff: 729

Other information
- Website: https://www.mbusd.org/

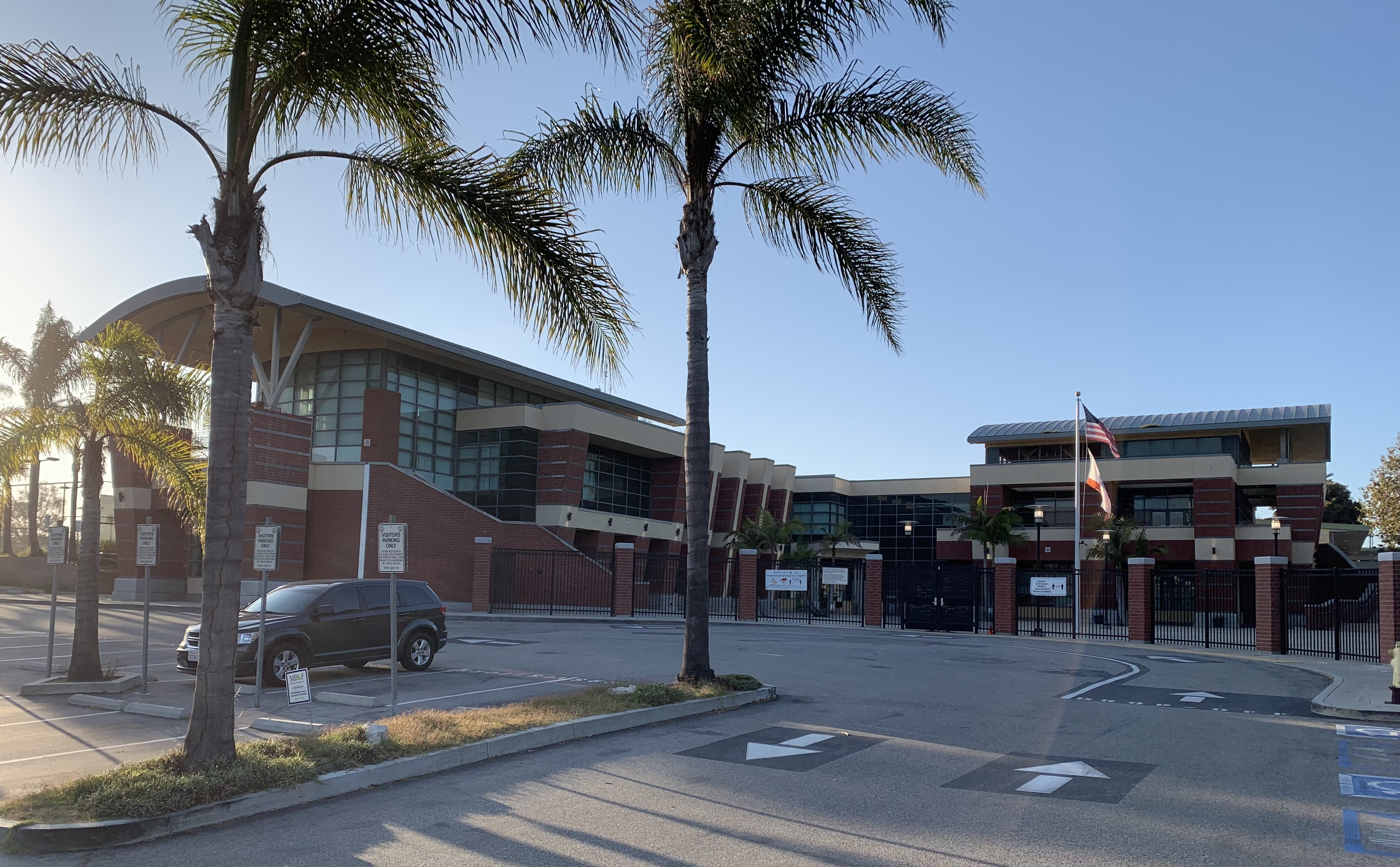
Mira Costa High School

The Manhattan Beach Unified School District is responsible for public education in the city of Manhattan Beach, California. It oversees one preschool, five elementary schools, one middle school, and one high school.

MBUSD serves the city of Manhattan Beach. In addition, residents of Hermosa Beach may choose to attend Redondo Union High School of the Redondo Beach Unified School District or the Mira Costa High School of MBUSD.

The district as a whole received a score of 906 on the 2006 California Academic Performance Index (API), making it one of California's best performing districts. Each individual school also ranks at the top of its respective category.

School	2006 API Score
Grand View Elementary (Gators)	954
Meadows Avenue Elementary (Mustangs)	947
Pacific Elementary (Panthers)	971
Pennekamp Elementary (Dragons)	963
Robinson Elementary (Dolphins)	970
Manhattan Beach Middle (Waves)	923
Mira Costa High School (Mustangs)	852

The school district has a history of failing to accommodate the needs of special education students. One such case was that of Douglas Shulby, who, in 1998, was forcibly removed from the Mira Costa campus grounds by law enforcement and school officials, due to a failure to accommodate his special needs associated with his Asperger syndrome.

Similar efforts have been documented as in Porter v. Manhattan Beach school District.

== Schools ==
=== Preschool ===
- Manhattan Beach Preschool

=== Elementary Schools ===
- Grand View Elementary School
- Meadows Elementary School
- Pacific Elementary School
- Pennekamp Elementary School
- Robinson Elementary School

=== Middle School ===
- Manhattan Beach Middle School

=== High School ===
- Mira Costa High School

== History ==
Residents of the district were in the Manhattan Beach elementary school district and South Bay Union High School District until 1993, when it dissolved. Manhattan Beach USD formed in 1993 as a result.
