= South Bay Union High School District =

School district in California

South Bay Union High School District, also known as the Redondo Union High School District, was a school district in Los Angeles County, California. It served residents of Hermosa Beach, Manhattan Beach, and Redondo Beach. It also served Torrance in the 1947-1948 school year.

== History ==
It was established circa 1905. Redondo Union High School was the district's first high school. Torrance High School was part of this district only for the 1947-1948 school year, as California law prevented the newly-formed Torrance school district from immediately controlling high schools. The following year it became the Torrance Unified School District and took control of Torrance High. The second comprehensive high school that remained a part of the district, Mira Costa High School, opened in 1950.

It had 7,000 students in 1970. The number of students decreased, prompting the district to close Aviation High School in 1982.

In 1991 the elementary school districts within South Bay Union HSD had plans to unify into a single K-12 school district.

In spring 1991 the enrollment was down to 2,900. For the 1991-1992 school year the district was facing a budget shortfall of $1.4 million dollars and was considering closing either Mira Costa High School or Redondo Union High School.

In November 1992 residents of the district approved Proposition V by 59.1%, which dissolved South Bay Union and created separate K-12 unified school districts for the constituent cities. The school district was scheduled to dissolve in July 1993. Manhattan Beach Unified School District and Redondo Beach Unified School District were formed as a result. Hermosa Beach City School District continued to serve Hermosa Beach for grades K-8, with residents able to choose between Redondo Union and Mira Costa high schools.

== Schools ==
Open at the time of the district's dissolution

- Mira Costa High School (Manhattan Beach)
- Redondo Union High School (Redondo Beach)
- Pacific Shores Continuation School - Closed June 30, 1993

Left the district prior to dissolution

- Aviation High School (Redondo Beach) - closed in 1982
- Torrance High School (Torrance) - Was in the Redondo Beach Union HSD for the 1947-1948 school year, after it left the Los Angeles City High School District and before it joined the Torrance Unified School District. At the time in California law a newly formed school district could not immediately take high school facilities, so Torrance High joined South Bay Union HSD for the one year wait.
