= Semra Hunter =

American journalist

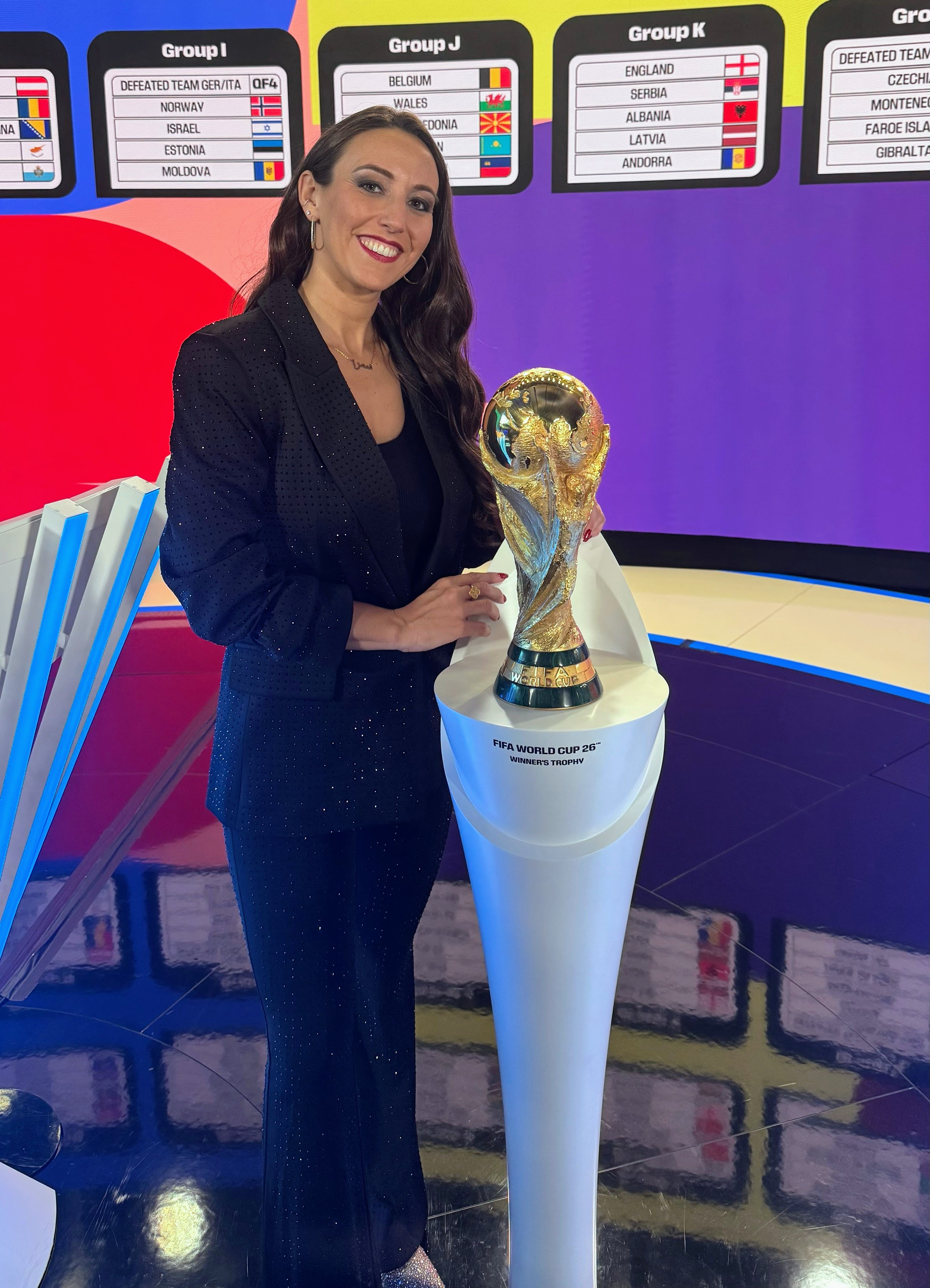
- Semra Hunter hosting the FIFA World Cup 2026 UEFA Preliminary Draw in Zurich, Switzerland
- Born: March 11, 1987 (age 39); Los Angeles, California, United States
- Education: Mira Costa High School
- Alma mater: University of California
- Occupations: Sports Broadcast; Journalist Event Host

Semra Hunter (born March 11, 1987), is an American broadcast journalist and expert in Spanish football.

== Early life and education ==
Hunter grew up in Los Angeles and was into football from an early age. Hunter harbored ambitions of becoming a professional footballer, but a bad injury at 16 put her on a different life path. Hunter graduated from Mira Costa High School in 2005. After studying international relations at the University of California, Berkeley, where she did her bachelor's degree in peace and conflict studies, Hunter studied at the Real Madrid International School, where she did her master's degree in communication and sports journalism. Hunter was a junior Olympic volleyball champion.

== Career ==
Hunter began her broadcasting journey as an intern for Al-Jazeera Sport before being scouted to join Real Madrid TV for two and a half years. She then moved to Istanbul for two years as a sports anchor and correspondent for Beyond the Game’s daily sports news programme. In 2018 she returned to Spain, and started working for La Liga TV. Hunter developed a niche in Spanish football as a multi-lingual presenter, reporter and event host, and has also hosted coverage for the Champions League, World Cup and European Championships for major international broadcast networks. Hunter is the face of Spanish football as an expert for the likes of BBC, the Guardian, Sky Sports, Talksport, CNN, ITV, and Channel 4.

In 2025, Semra co-hosted Red Bull Faster, a collaborative event between Red Bull and TrackMania streamer Wirtual.

Hunter was the host for FIFA’s UEFA Preliminary Draw for the 2026 World Cup.

== Personal ==
Hunter speaks four languages: Spanish, English, Turkish and Catalan.
