= Mira Costa High School =

Public high school in Manhattan Beach, California

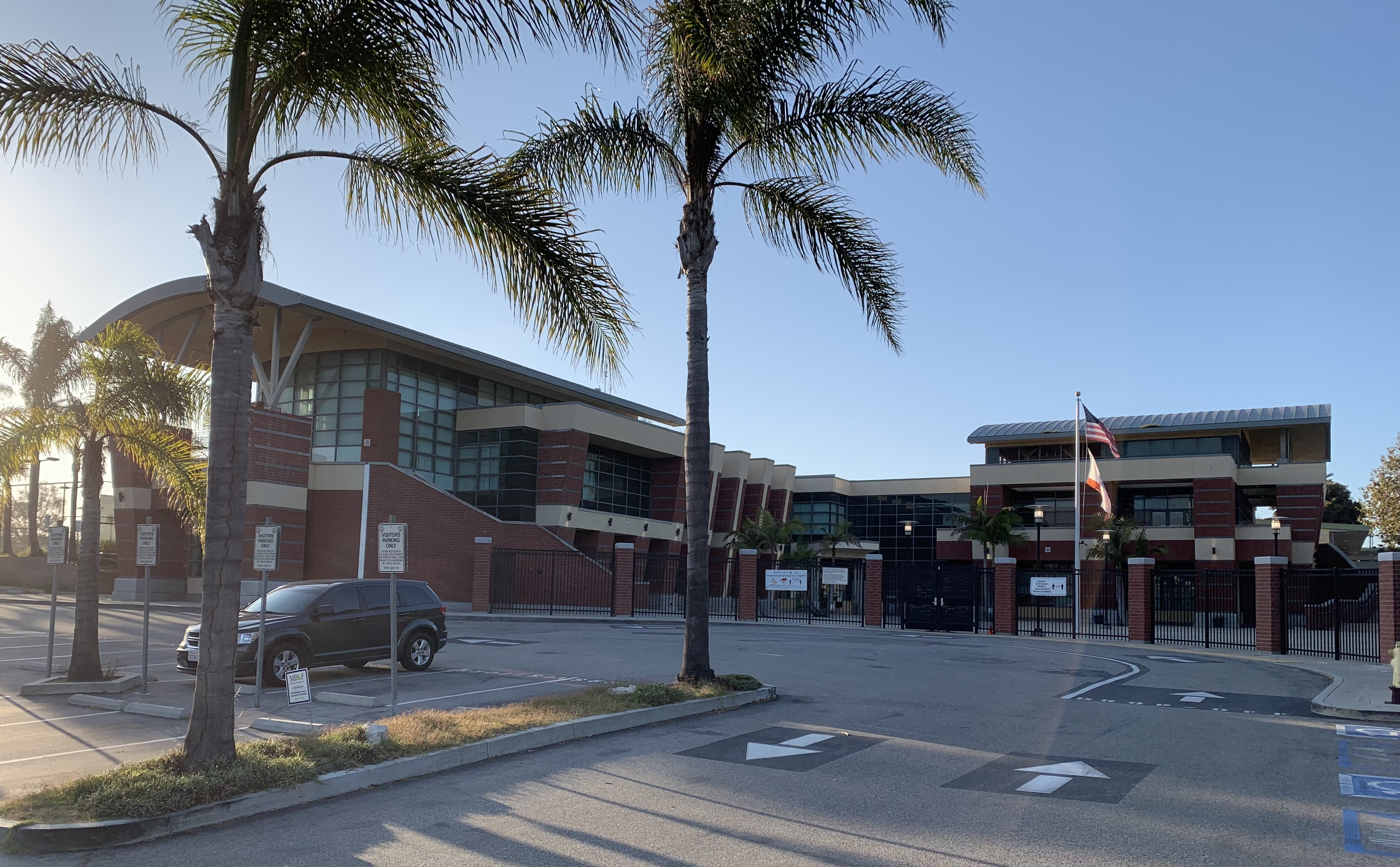

Location
- 1401 Artesia Boulevard; Manhattan Beach, California 90266; United States; 33.87368°N 118.38976°W

Information
- Type: Public high school
- Motto: Home of the mustangs
- Established: 1950
- School district: Manhattan Beach Unified School District (1993-present); South Bay Union High School District (1950-1993)
- Principal: Jennifer Huynh
- Teaching staff: 100.32 (FTE)
- Grades: 9 – 12
- Enrollment: 2,473 (2024-2025)
- Student to teacher ratio: 24.65
- Colors: Green and Gold
- Nickname: Mustangs
- Rival: Redondo Union High School, El Segundo High School
- Publication: La Vista (Newspaper); Reflections (student created work); Mustang Morning News (student-run newscast)
- Yearbook: Hoofprints
- Website: miracosta.mbusd.org

Mira Costa High School (MCHS, "Costa") is a four-year public high school located in Manhattan Beach, California, United States that first opened 1950. It is the only high school in the Manhattan Beach Unified School District. The school's athletic teams are known as the Mustangs and the school colors are green and gold. Mira Costa is located on the corner of Peck Avenue and Artesia Boulevard.

== History ==
Groundbreaking for the site of the school took place on May 24, 1949, for the first high school in Manhattan Beach. It was a forty-acre site that had belonged to a Japanese American landscaper who had been interned during World War II and was paid $60,000 for the land. Mira Costa High School opened on September 30, 1950. The school was dedicated by then-state superintendent of schools, Roy E. Simpson, with additional remarks made by the president of the board of trustees.

It was a part of the South Bay Union High School District until 1993, when this district was dissolved and the Manhattan Beach Unified School District (MBUSD) was formed.

== School information ==
As of the 2024–25 school year, the school had an enrollment of 2,473 students and 100 classroom teachers (on an FTE basis), for a student–teacher ratio of 24.65:1. There were 169 students (6.8% of enrollment) eligible for free lunch and 4 (0.16% of students) eligible for reduced-cost lunch.

Ethnic composition
Race	Percentage
American Indian/Alaskan Native	0.1%
Asian	11.1 %
Black	1.2%
Hispanic	14.8%
White	58.8%
Pacific Islander	0.2%
Multiple races	13.4%

Mira Costa is the only high school in the MBUSD. All residents of Manhattan Beach are eligible to attend. Residents of Hermosa Beach may choose to attend Redondo Union High School of the Redondo Beach Unified School District or Mira Costa. As of Fall 2006, Redondo Beach residents living in the 90278 zip code were allowed to attend Mira Costa.

== Extracurricular activities and programs ==
=== Choir program ===
The Mira Costa Choir Program consists of three curricular choirs, Vocal Ensemble, Choral Union (an upper voice choir), and MC voices, which meet during the school day year-round, and two small ensembles, Coterie and Mira Costa Muscle, which meet after school.

In the summer of 2010 Vocal Ensemble sang in the International Festival of the Aegean in Syros, Greece. They performed as part of the opera chorus in Carmen and were the closing choir in the Sunset Concert at St. Nicholas Cathedral on Sunday, 18 July 2010.

In the Spring of 2011, all four Mira Costa Choirs performed in Carnegie Hall as part of Carnegie Hall's WorldStrides National Choral Festival. The Vocal Ensemble had the honor of performing as the featured solo choir.

=== Mira Costa Bands ===
The Mira Costa Bands is one of the largest student groups on campus. It is directed by Joel Carlson and consists of 3 concert ensembles—the Wind Symphony, Wind Ensemble, and Symphonic Band---, 2 Jazz Bands—Jazz 1 and Jazz 2--, the Marching Band, Winterguard, and Indoor Drumline.

In May 2016, the Mira Costa Bands traveled to Carnegie Hall in New York as part of a series outlining the best band programs in the country. The band had previously performed at Carnegie Hall in 2011. In 2024, the Jazz bands won the National Jazz Festival in Philadelphia. Additionally, in 2022 the Wind Symphony won first place at the Presidents Cup concert band festival and the combined Symphonic and Wind Ensemble group, performing as the Symphony Band, placed 2nd. In 2014, the band received the Grammy Foundation Signature Schools 2014 Gold Award, which includes a grant of $5000.

=== La Vista ===
Mira Costa's student-run newspaper La Vista has been a perennial winner of silver and gold awards from the Columbia Scholastic Press Association since 1980.

=== Mustang Morning News ===
The Mustang Morning News is a student-run broadcast.

=== Model United Nations ===
Mira Costa Model United Nations is a debate team that takes part in mock debates of the United Nations. The team hosts the Los Angeles Invitational Model United Nations (LAIMUN) Conference, a novice and advanced conference held in docket-style debate. Mira Costa's team has multiple Large School Delegation awards.

=== Beach Cities Robotics ===
Costa students team up with Redondo Union High School students to create Beach Cities Robotics. The team participates in the organization FIRST (For Inspiration and Recognition of Science and Technology) as Team 294. Beach Cities Robotics has won numerous awards since starting in 1997, including 2 World Championship wins. They scored 1st place at the FRC finals in 2001 against more than 50 other teams at the event from around the country. In 2008, they won first place at the inaugural FTC World Championship. Beach Cities Robotics won the FRC finals again in 2010 as its "alliance" captain, against over 300 teams attending the World Championship, and over 1800 teams worldwide.

=== Volleyball team ===
Alix Klineman, who was named the 2005 and 2006 California Gatorade State Player of the Year for Volleyball, and the 2006 Gatorade National Player of the Year, led Mira Costa to three consecutive California State Championships, and three consecutive Southern Section California Interscholastic Federation (CIF) Championships. The Boys' Volleyball team has won the Southern Section California Interscholastic Federation (CIF) Championships in 1984, 1990, 1996, 2001, 2002, 2008 and 2012.

== Recognition ==
Mira Costa was recognized as a Blue Ribbon school in 1996. It was named a California Distinguished School by the Board of Education in 2011 and ranked #341 nationally by Newsweek in 2015.

In 2000, 12th-grade English teacher Marilyn Jachetti Whirry was selected as the National Teacher of the Year. Whirry had taught at Mira Costa in the 1958–59 academic year and then from 1967 through 2000.

In September 2010, U.S. history teacher Bill Fauver was selected as one of Los Angeles County's 16 Teachers of the Year. He was once named MBUSD Teacher of the Year.

== Notable alumni ==
- Jeff Atkinson – Class of 1981, Olympian, Track and Field runner
- Milo Aukerman – Class of 1981, singer for punk rock band Descendents
- David Benoit – Class of 1971, jazz pianist, conductor, and composer
- Rachel Bloom – Class of 2005, actress, comedian, and screenwriter; 2015 Golden Globes winner for Best Actress in a Comedy Series
- Jamais Cascio – Class of 1983, author and futurist
- Mike Dodd – Class of 1975, beach volleyball pioneer
- Eric Fonoimoana – Class of 1988, gold medal-winning Olympian, professional volleyball player
- Anitra Ford – actress and model, original model on The Price Is Right, 1972–1977
- Semra Hunter – Class of 2005, football journalist
- Kyle Karros, MLB infielder
- Alix Klineman (born 1989) – Class of 2007, gold medal-winning Olympian, volleyball player
- Jimmy Lindberg – Class of 1983, co-founder of punk rock band Pennywise
- Gavin MacIntosh – Class of 2016, model, actor in Freeform's TV series The Fosters
- Noah Mamet – Class of 1987, US Ambassador to Argentina
- Jill McCormick – Class of 1995, philanthropist, activist and fashion model
- Holly McPeak – Class of 1987, Olympian, professional volleyball player
- Chase Meidroth, MLB second baseman
- Joe Moeller – Class of 1960, professional baseball pitcher, Los Angeles Dodgers (1962–1971)
- Carrie Nugent – Class of 2002, astronomer
- Dylan O'Brien – Class of 2009, actor in MTV's Teen Wolf and The Maze Runner movies
- Mike Okwo – Class of 2003, professional football player, Chicago Bears
- Dave Rat – Class of 1980, sound engineer
- Jeff Rohrer – Class of 1977, professional football player, Dallas Cowboys (1982–1987)
- Taylor Spivey – Class of 2009, triathlete
- Bill Stevenson – Class of 1981, drummer for punk rock bands Descendents, Black Flag, and ALL
- Danny Strong – Class of 1992, actor and award-winning screenwriter (Game Change, Recount)
- Michele Tafoya – Class of 1983, sportscaster; Emmy winner for Sports Personality-Sports Reporter
- The Tavai brothers: Jonah Tavai (Class of 2018), Justus Tavai, Jahlani Tavai, and J. R. Tavai (Class of 2011), all football players
- Avi Vinocur – Class of 2002, musician, member of Americana band Goodnight, Texas and occasional Metallica collaborator
- Dewey Weber – Class of 1956, surfing pioneer
- Marianne Sellek Wibberly and Cormac Wibberly – Class of 1982 and 1979, screenwriters

== In television and film ==
Mira Costa High School was a common filming location for the popular television series The O.C. In 2006, a portion of the quad was used as a scene in The O.C. In 1981, portions of the film "Midnight Offerings" starring Melissa Sue Anderson were filmed on the campus. In 1979, many members of the football and cheerleading squads, attired in their green and gold uniforms, were included as extras in the film Rock 'n' Roll High School. The administration building of Mira Costa High School was used as the high school for the Disney Channel TV shows A.N.T Farm and Hannah Montana. In 2008, an episode of CSI: Miami was filmed on campus, using the pool and members of the varsity swim team as extras. In 2011, much of rapper Snoop Dogg's Mac & Devin Go to High School was filmed on campus, sparking a controversy over the characters' use of marijuana on school property and administration officials demanded that the footage not be used in the final movie.
