= Redondo Beach, California =

- City
- Redondo Beach - King Harbor sign

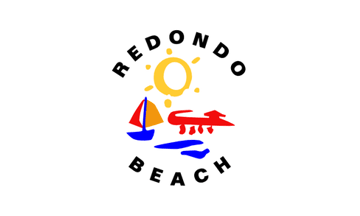
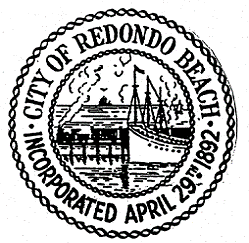
- Flag Seal Logo
- Interactive map of Redondo Beach, California
- Location in the contiguous United States
- Coordinates: 33°51′29″N 118°22′44″W
- Country: United States
- State: California
- County: Los Angeles
- Incorporated: April 29, 1892
- Named for: Spanish for round, in reference to Rancho Sausal Redondo, Spanish for round willow grove ranch

Government
  - Type: Council–manager
  - Mayor: James "Jim" Light
  - Mayor Pro Tem: Scott Behrendt
  - Councilmembers: D1: Brad Waller; D2: Chadwick Castle; D3: Paige Kaluderovic; D4: Zein Obagi Jr. D5: Scott Behrendt
  - City Treasurer: Eugene Solomon
  - City Clerk: Eleanor Manzano

Area
  - Total: 6.21 sq mi (16.09 km^{2})
  - Land: 6.20 sq mi (16.06 km^{2})
  - Water: 0.012 sq mi (0.03 km^{2}) 0.16%
- Elevation: 62 ft (19 m)

Population (2020)
  - Total: 71,576
  - Density: 11,540/sq mi (4,457/km^{2})
- Time zone: UTC−8 (Pacific)
  - Summer (DST): UTC−7 (PDT)
- ZIP Codes: 90277–90278
- Area code: 310/424
- FIPS code: 06-60018
- GNIS feature IDs: 1652782, 2411535
- Website: redondo.gov

Redondo Beach (Redondo, Spanish for 'round') is a coastal city in Los Angeles County, California, United States, located in the South Bay region of the Greater Los Angeles area. It is one of three adjacent beach cities along the southern portion of Santa Monica Bay. The population was 71,576 at the 2020 census, up from 66,748 in 2010.

Redondo Beach was originally part of the 1784 Rancho San Pedro Spanish land grant that later became the South Redondo area. The primary attractions include Municipal Pier and the sandy beach, popular with tourists and a variety of sports enthusiasts. The Southern terminus of the Metro Rail K Line (formerly the Western Terminus of the Metro Rail C Line) is in North Redondo Beach.

== History ==
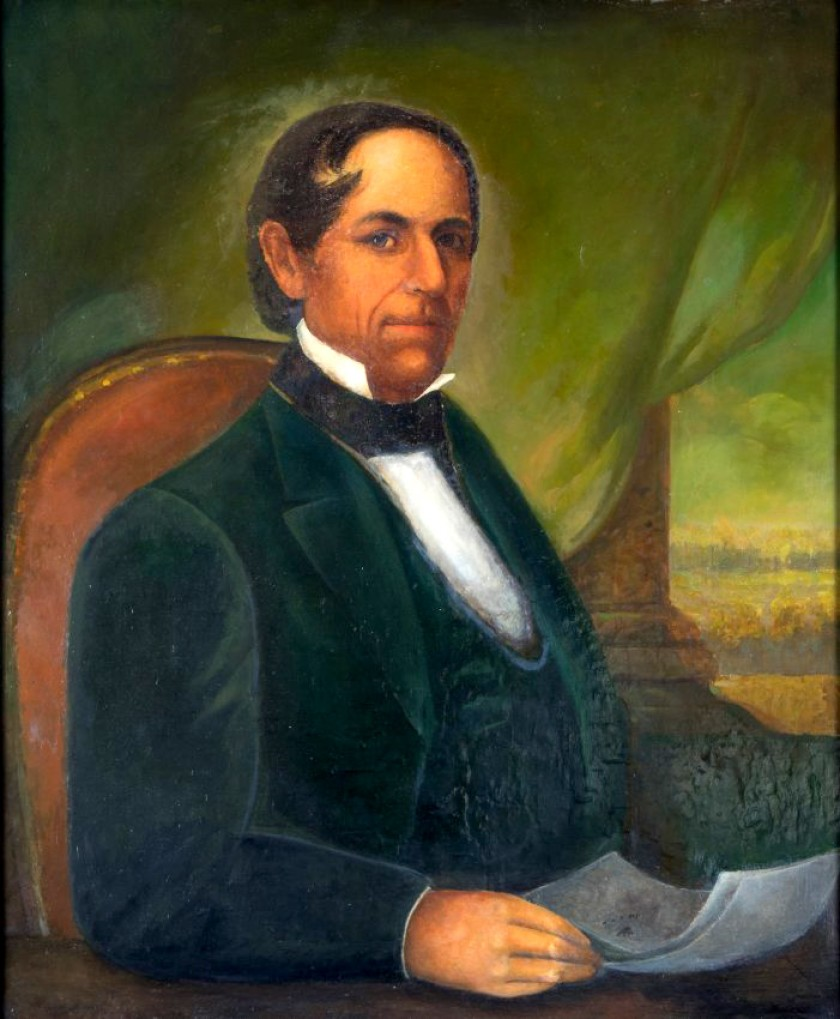
Don Manuel Domínguez, a signer of the Californian Constitution and owner of Rancho San Pedro, which included all of modern-day Redondo.

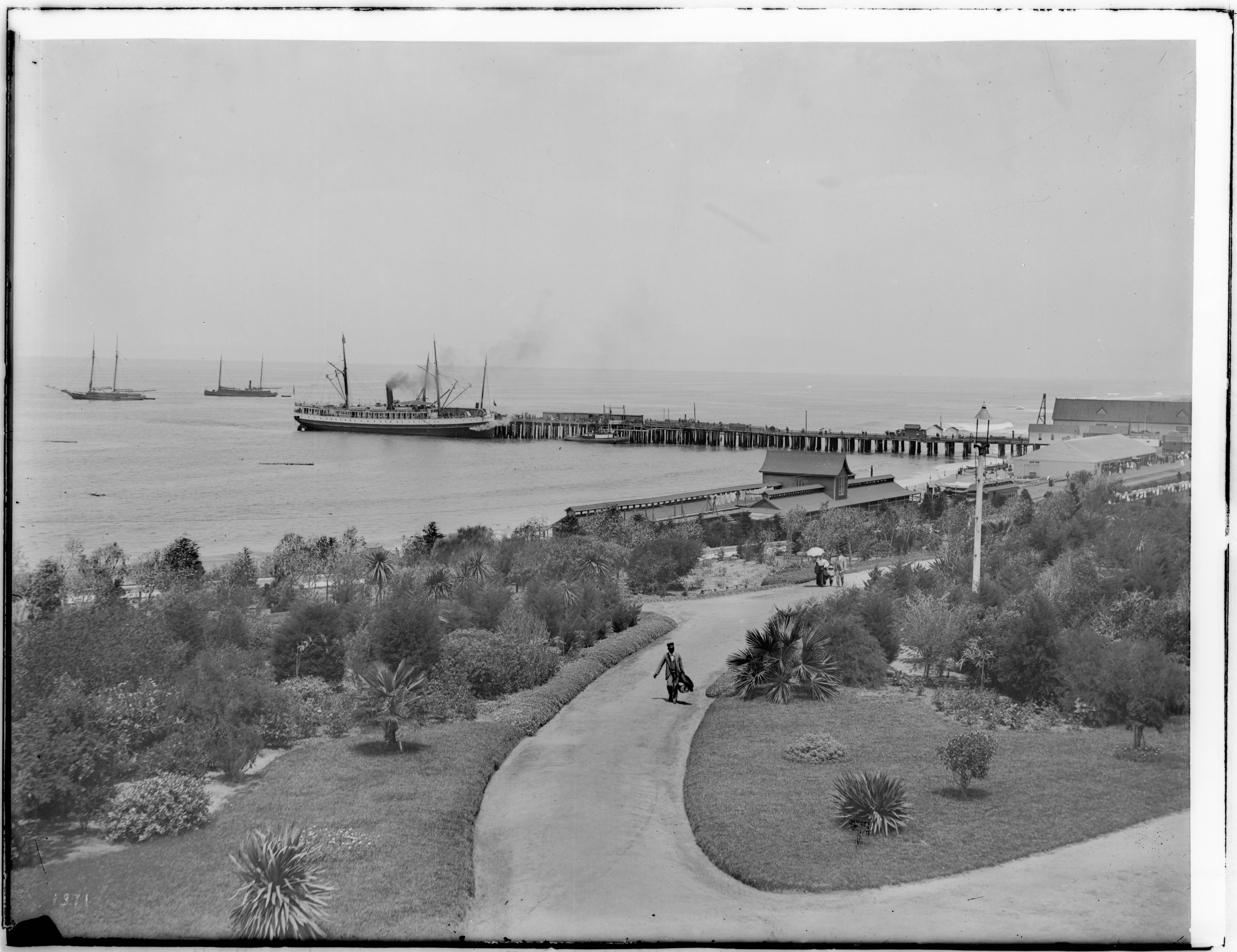
View of Redondo Beach Pier and railroad station from the Redondo Hotel, c. 1900

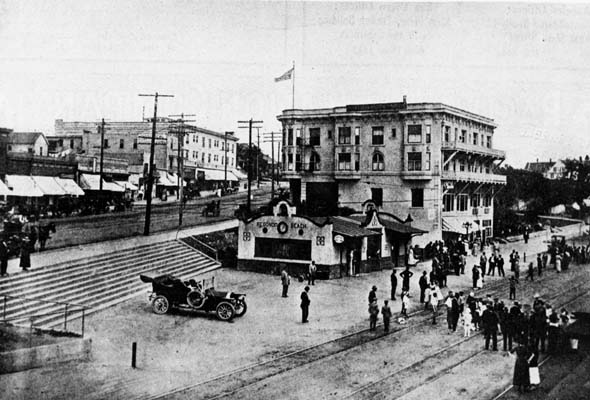
Redondo Beach, 1906

The South Bay area was originally inhabited by the Tongva tribe of Native Americans. Archeological work in the nearby Chowigna excavation show evidence of inhabitants as far back as 7,100 years ago. The Chowigna band of Tongva used the site of today's Hopkins Wilderness Park in Redondo Beach (formerly Nike missile site LA-57 from 1956 to 1963) as a lookout place. The wetlands located at the site of the retired AES power plant in Redondo Beach were a source of foods including halibut, lobster, and sea bass, and also of salt.

The Tongva village of Ongovanga or Onoova-nga, meaning "Place of Salt," was located near a salt lake the old Redondo Salt Lake, "a spring-fed salt lake about 200 yards [180 m] wide and 600 yards [550 m] long situated about 200 yards from the ocean". Up through the 1700s, the Chowigna bartered salt from the lake with other tribes.

The Chowigna were relocated to missions in 1854, when Manuel Dominguez sold 215 acres (87 ha) of Rancho San Pedro, including the lake, to Henry Allanson and William Johnson for the Pacific Salt Works.

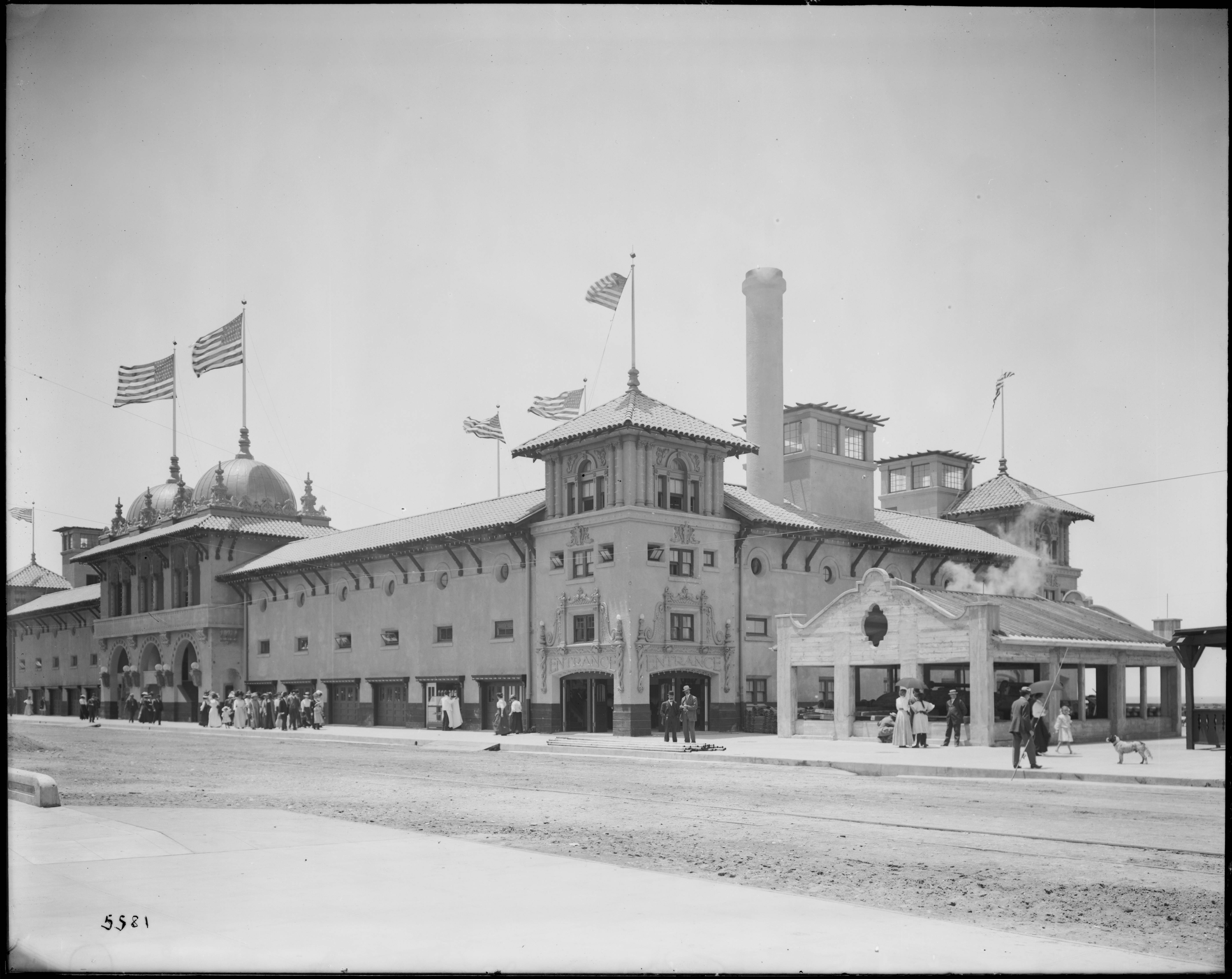
Redondo Beach saltwater bathhouse, constructed by Henry E. Huntington, c. 1910

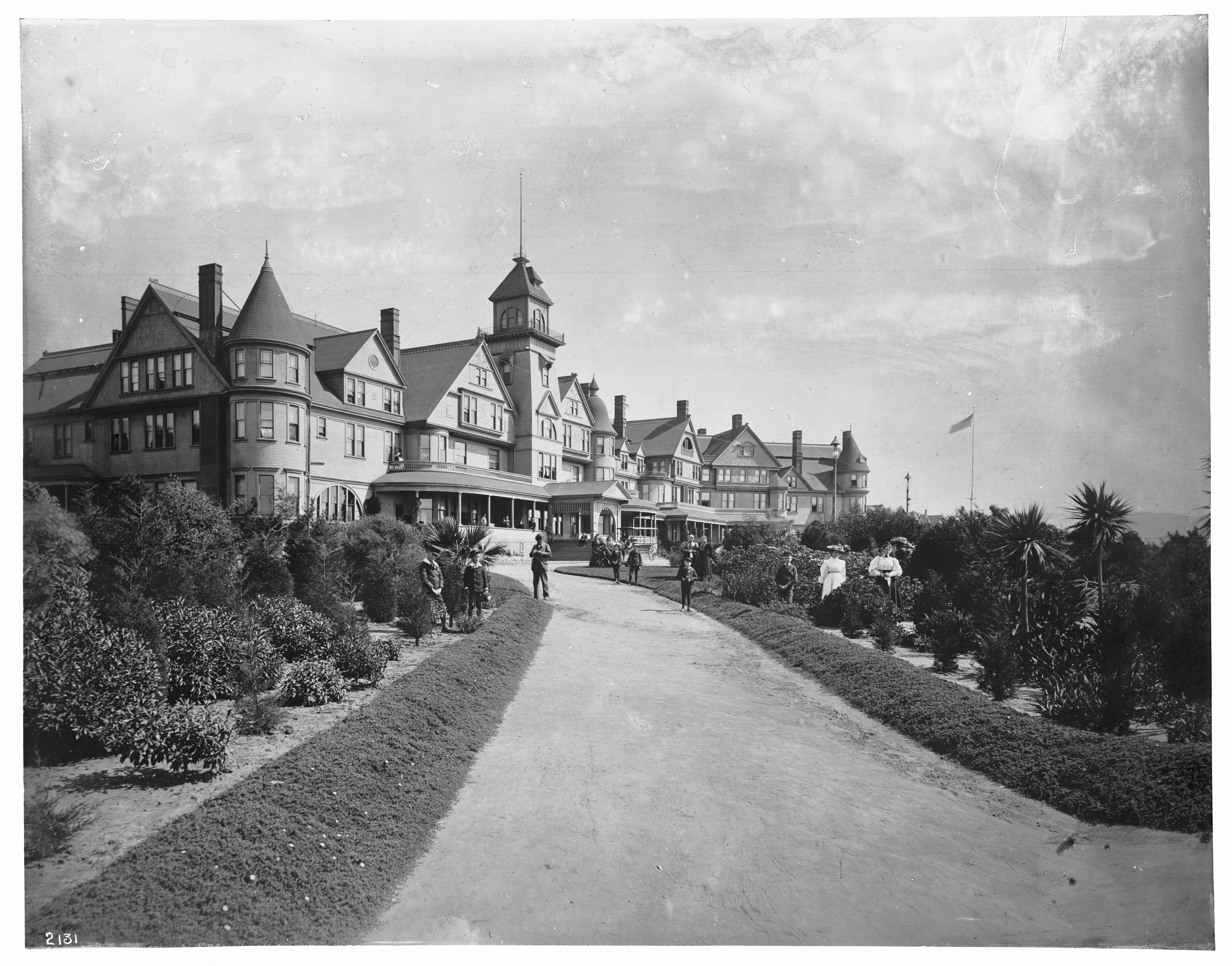
The Hotel Redondo which stood in Redondo Beach until 1925.

In 1983, the city of Redondo Beach adopted a resolution "recognizing the Goodyear Airship Columbia (aka Goodyear blimp) as the "Official Bird of Redondo Beach."

In 2022, the Redondo Beach government (along with the governments of Torrance, Carson, and Whittier) sued the California state government, seeking to block the California HOME Act (SB 9), which permits the construction of duplexes and fourplexes on lots. Former Redondo Beach mayor Bill Brand argued that there is no housing crisis in Redondo Beach.

In 2023, Redondo Beach rejected an application to transform the lot of an aging waterfront power plant into a village-style complex of 2,700 residential units (including 540 affordable units) and commercial space on the grounds that the application was incomplete. The City was sued by "Yes in My Backyard," but the lawsuit is unresolved as the property is in bankruptcy hearings.

Bill Brand became mayor of Redondo Beach after spearheading the effort to block a 525,000 square foot mall project in King Harbor. Brand had also successfully negotiated a reduction in the number of apartment units in a mixed use development along PCH. The city's residents and political leaders have long advocated to retire the plant and allow it to be restored to its natural wetland state. The city has also participated in legal proceedings to preserve its ability to participate in residential zoning decisions, including the discretion to regulate single-family homes from being transformed by for-profit developers into "six-on-a-lots."

In 2024, Redondo Beach became the first city to achieve "Functional Zero" homelessness in LA County. South Bay Council of Governments (SBCOG) defines "Functional Zero" as more people exiting homelessness than entering it, and also requires that the median time in homelessness be less than 90 days. SBCOG noted Redondo's transitional pallet shelters, "Homeless Court", Project Homekey permanent supportive housing, and other homeless services.

== Geography ==
According to the United States Census Bureau, the city has a total area of 6.21 square miles (16.1 km^{2}), over 99% of it land.

Redondo Beach was originally part of the 1784 Rancho San Pedro Spanish land grant of the 43,000-acre (170 km^{2}) Dominguez Rancho that later became the ten-mile (16 km) ocean frontage of Rancho Sausal Redondo.

=== Climate ===
Redondo Beach has a warm-summer Mediterranean climate (Köppen climate classification: Csb) with mild winters and warm, almost rainless summers. The coldest months are December through March, and the warmest months are July through September. Redondo Beach has mild temperatures year round due to its coastal location.

Climate data for Redondo Beach, California (normals 2000–2020, extremes 2000–present)
Month	Jan	Feb	Mar	Apr	May	Jun	Jul	Aug	Sep	Oct	Nov	Dec	Year
Record high °F (°C)	91 (33)	88 (31)	91 (33)	93 (34)	100 (38)	90 (32)	88 (31)	93 (34)	96 (36)	102 (39)	93 (34)	85 (29)	102 (39)
Mean maximum °F (°C)	80.4 (26.9)	79.5 (26.4)	80.7 (27.1)	80.6 (27.0)	79.0 (26.1)	78.7 (25.9)	83.3 (28.5)	82.5 (28.1)	86.9 (30.5)	88.4 (31.3)	85.4 (29.7)	77.3 (25.2)	92.6 (33.7)
Mean daily maximum °F (°C)	66.6 (19.2)	65.9 (18.8)	66.0 (18.9)	67.5 (19.7)	69.5 (20.8)	72.1 (22.3)	75.6 (24.2)	76.5 (24.7)	76.1 (24.5)	74.0 (23.3)	70.6 (21.4)	66.4 (19.1)	70.6 (21.4)
Daily mean °F (°C)	57.0 (13.9)	56.7 (13.7)	58.0 (14.4)	59.6 (15.3)	62.6 (17.0)	65.3 (18.5)	69.0 (20.6)	69.7 (20.9)	69.0 (20.6)	65.6 (18.7)	60.9 (16.1)	56.6 (13.7)	62.5 (16.9)
Mean daily minimum °F (°C)	47.3 (8.5)	47.5 (8.6)	49.9 (9.9)	51.6 (10.9)	55.7 (13.2)	58.4 (14.7)	62.4 (16.9)	62.9 (17.2)	61.8 (16.6)	57.1 (13.9)	51.1 (10.6)	46.8 (8.2)	54.4 (12.4)
Mean minimum °F (°C)	38.5 (3.6)	39.9 (4.4)	43.7 (6.5)	46.2 (7.9)	50.6 (10.3)	54.9 (12.7)	58.3 (14.6)	58.5 (14.7)	55.9 (13.3)	50.7 (10.4)	43.3 (6.3)	38.3 (3.5)	37.5 (3.1)
Record low °F (°C)	31 (−1)	36 (2)	40 (4)	43 (6)	46 (8)	51 (11)	53 (12)	51 (11)	51 (11)	47 (8)	36 (2)	35 (2)	31 (−1)
Average precipitation inches (mm)	2.97 (75)	3.69 (94)	2.24 (57)	0.62 (16)	0.32 (8.1)	0.09 (2.3)	0.05 (1.3)	0.01 (0.25)	0.12 (3.0)	0.52 (13)	0.77 (20)	2.36 (60)	13.76 (350)
Average precipitation days (≥ 0.01 in)	5.5	5.6	4.9	2.7	1.8	0.7	0.8	0.2	0.5	3.2	3.4	5.8	35.1
Source: NOAA

== Demographics ==
Historical population
Census	Pop.	Note	%±
1890	603		—
1900	855		41.8%
1910	2,935		243.3%
1920	4,913		67.4%
1930	9,347		90.3%
1940	13,092		40.1%
1950	25,226		92.7%
1960	46,986		86.3%
1970	57,451		22.3%
1980	57,102		−0.6%
1990	60,167		5.4%
2000	63,261		5.1%
2010	66,748		5.5%
2020	71,576		7.2%
U.S. Decennial Census; 1860–1870 1880-1890; 1900 1910 1920; 1930 1940 1950; 1960 1970 1980; 1990 2000 2010; 2020

Redondo Beach first appeared as a city in the 1890 United States census as part of the now defunct Chataqua Township.

=== Racial and ethnic composition ===
Redondo Beach city, California – Racial and ethnic composition Note: the US Census treats Hispanic/Latino as an ethnic category. This table excludes Latinos from the racial categories and assigns them to a separate category. Hispanics/Latinos may be of any race.
Race / Ethnicity (NH = Non-Hispanic)	Pop 1980	Po 1990	Pop 2000	Pop 2010	Pop 2020	% 1980	% 1990	% 2000	% 2010	% 2020
White alone (NH)	47,238	48,010	44,819	43,531	40,796	82.73%	79.79%	70.85%	65.22%	57.00%
Black or African American alone (NH)	760	921	1,531	1,772	2,103	1.33%	1.53%	2.42%	2.65%	2.94%
Native American or Alaska Native alone (NH)	414	255	185	163	187	0.73%	0.42%	0.29%	0.24%	0.26%
Asian alone (NH)	2,013	3,997	5,677	7,858	10,085	2.53%	6.64%	8.97%	11.77%	14.09%
Native Hawaiian or Pacific Islander alone (NH)	2,013	3,997	212	177	183	2.53%	6.64%	0.34%	0.27%	0.26%
Other race alone (NH)	128	67	198	287	532	0.22%	0.11%	0.31%	0.43%	0.74%
Mixed Americans (NH)	x	x	2,115	2,818	5,193	x	x	3.34%	4.22%	7.26%
Hispanic or Latino (any race)	6,549	6,917	8,524	10,142	12,497	11.47%	11.50%	13.47%	15.19%	17.46%
Total	57,102	60,167	63,261	66,748	71,576	100.00%	100.00%	100.00%	100.00%	100.00%

=== 2020 census ===
As of the 2020 census, Redondo Beach had a population of 71,576. The median age was 40.9 years. 20.3% of residents were under the age of 18 and 14.7% of residents were 65 years of age or older. For every 100 females there were 101.3 males, and for every 100 females age 18 and over there were 100.9 males age 18 and over.

100.0% of residents lived in urban areas, while 0.0% lived in rural areas.

There were 29,472 households in Redondo Beach, of which 29.7% had children under the age of 18 living in them. Of all households, 46.1% were married-couple households, 20.7% were households with a male householder and no spouse or partner present, and 26.3% were households with a female householder and no spouse or partner present. About 30.1% of all households were made up of individuals and 10.1% had someone living alone who was 65 years of age or older.

There were 30,999 housing units, of which 4.9% were vacant. The homeowner vacancy rate was 0.8% and the rental vacancy rate was 4.4%.

=== Contemporary demographics ===
The city is affluent and predominantly white.

The 2020 census found that 57.0% of Redondo Beach's residents are non-Hispanic white, similar to many of the coastal Los Angeles County communities (Malibu, Marina del Rey, Santa Monica, El Segundo, Manhattan Beach, Hermosa Beach, Palos Verdes Estates) despite the greater Los Angeles area being only 23.0% non-Hispanic white.

Redondo Beach, like its neighboring beach towns, has become one of the most exclusionary cities in Los Angeles by limiting housing production, resulting in a median home costing $1.4 million, 60% higher than the regional average for Los Angeles.

=== 2010 census ===
The 2010 United States census reported that Redondo Beach had a population of 66,748. The population density was 10,751.1 inhabitants per square mile (4,151.0/km^{2}). The racial makeup of Redondo Beach was 49,805 (74.6%) White (65.2% Non-Hispanic White), 1,852 (2.8%) African American, 291 (0.4%) Native American, 8,004 (12.0%) Asian, 199 (0.3%) Pacific Islander, 2,725 (4.1%) from other races, and 3,872 (5.8%) from two or more races. There were 10,142 residents of Hispanic or Latino ancestry, of any race (15.2%).

The Census reported that 66,317 people (99.4% of the population) lived in households, 367 (0.5%) lived in non-institutionalized group quarters, and 64 (0.1%) were institutionalized.

There were 29,011 households, out of which 7,825 (27.0%) had children under the age of 18 living in them, 12,507 (43.1%) were opposite-sex married couples living together, 2,515 (8.7%) had a female householder with no husband present, 1,207 (4.2%) had a male householder with no wife present. There were 1,904 (6.6%) unmarried opposite-sex partnerships, and 179 (0.6%) same-sex married couples or partnerships. 9,252 households (31.9%) were made up of individuals, and 2,145 (7.4%) had someone living alone who was 65 years of age or older. The average household size was 2.29. There were 16,229 families (55.9% of all households); the average family size was 2.94.

Redondo Beach had 12,887 people (19.3%) under the age of 18, 4,198 people (6.3%) aged 18 to 24, 23,149 people (34.7%) aged 25 to 44, 19,532 people (29.3%) aged 45 to 64, and 6,982 people (10.5%) who were 65 years of age or older. The median age was 39.3 years. For every 100 females, there were 99.1 males. For every 100 females age 18 and over, there were 97.2 males.

There were 30,609 housing units at an average density of 4,930.2 units per square mile (1,903.6 units/km^{2}), of which 14,917 (51.4%) were owner-occupied, and 14,094 (48.6%) were occupied by renters. The homeowner vacancy rate was 0.9%; the rental vacancy rate was 5.3%. 36,796 people (55.1% of the population) lived in owner-occupied housing units and 29,521 people (44.2%) lived in rental housing units.

According to the 2010 United States census, Redondo Beach had a median household income of $99,496, with 5.4% of the population living below the federal poverty line.

=== 2000 census ===
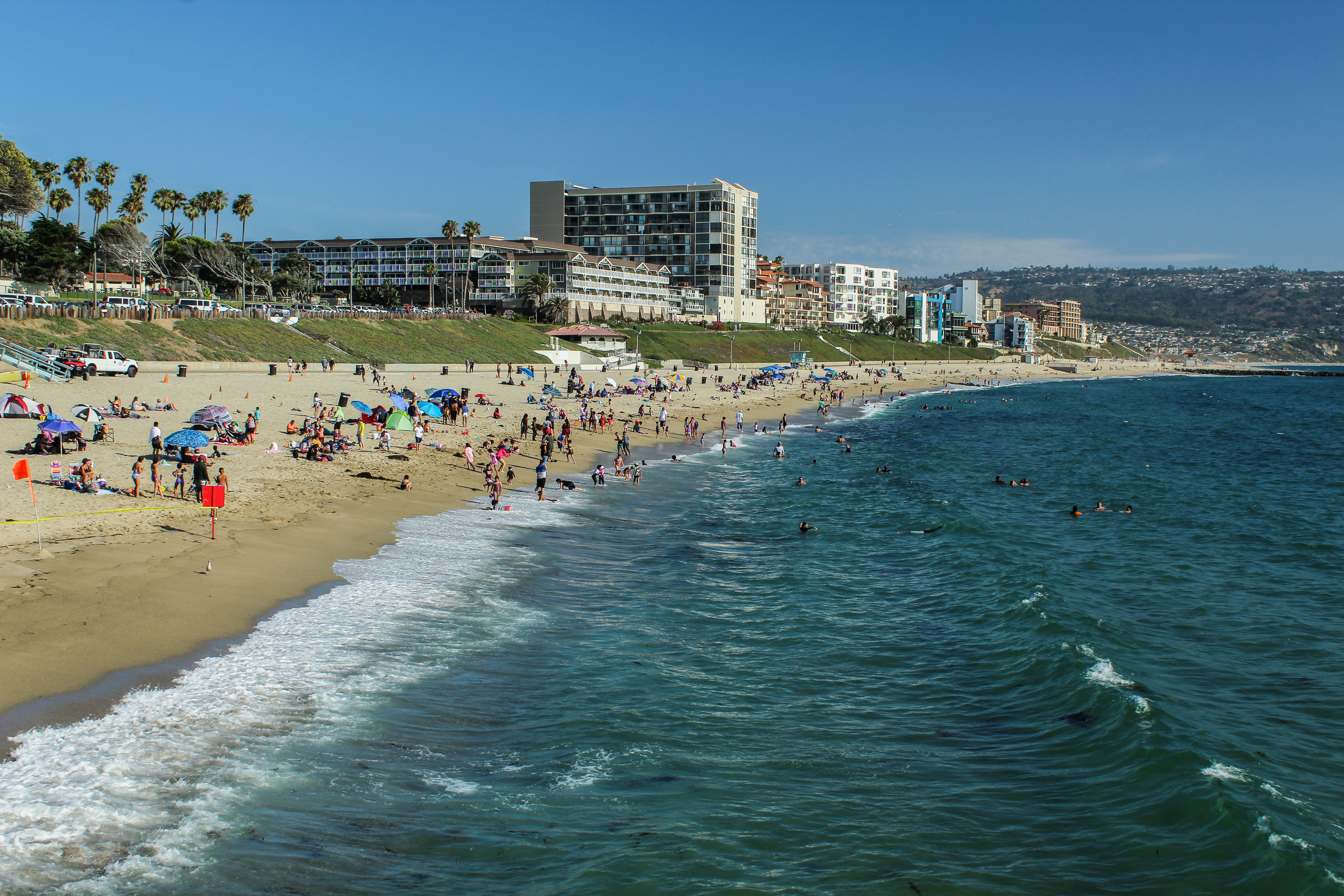
Shoreline of Redondo Beach, California

As of the census of 2000, there were 63,261 people, 28,566 households, and 15,254 families residing in the city. The population density was 10,065.4 inhabitants per square mile (3,886.3/km^{2}). There were 29,543 housing units at an average density of 4,700.6 units per square mile (1,814.9 units/km^{2}). The racial makeup of the city was 78.6% White, 9.1% Asian, 2.5% African American, 0.5% Native American, 0.4% Pacific Islander, 4.4% from other races, and 4.6, % from two or more races. Hispanic or Latino residents of any race were 13.5% of the population.

There were 28,566 households, out of which 23.3% had children under the age of 18 living with them, 40.6% were married couples living together, 9.0% had a female householder with no husband present, and 46.6% were non-families. 33.1% of all households were made up of individuals, and 5.9% had someone living alone who was 65 years of age or older. The average household size was 2.21 and the average family size was 2.87.

In the city, 18.8% of the population was under the age of 18; 6.1%, aged 18 to 24; 43.1%, aged 25 to 44; 23.6%, aged 45 to 64; and 8.5% aged 65 or older. The median age was 37 years. For every 100 females, there were 101.5 males. For every 100 females age 18 and over, there were 99.8 males.

According to a 2007 estimate, the median income for a household in the city was $93,274, and the median income for a family was $108,753. Males had a median income of $56,796 versus $45,204 for females. The per capita income for the city was $38,305. About 4.0% of families and 5.9% of the population were below the poverty line, including 6.2% of those under age 18 and 6.1% of those age 65 or over.

== Economy ==
According to the city's 2025 Annual Comprehensive Financial Report, the top employers in the city are:

#	Employer	# of Employees	% of Total City Employment
1	Northrop Grumman	6,845	18.78%
2	Redondo Beach Unified School District	954	2.62%
3	City of Redondo Beach	458	1.26%
4	The Cheesecake Factory	261	0.72%
5	Target	217	0.60%
6	Impulse Space	205	0.56%
7	Macy's	171	0.47%
8	Frontier	164	0.45%
9	United States Postal Service	152	0.42%
10	The Kensington Redondo Beach	130	0.36%

== Government ==
United States presidential election results for Redondo Beach, California
Year	Republican		Democratic		Third party(ies)	
Year	No.	%	No.	%	No.	%
2000	9,599	41.76%	12,063	52.48%	1,322	5.75%
2004	10,737	44.44%	13,075	54.12%	346	1.43%
2008	13,083	37.84%	20,703	59.88%	788	2.28%
2012	13,148	39.96%	18,718	56.89%	1,037	3.15%
2016	10,423	30.52%	21,247	62.22%	2,479	7.26%
2020	12,461	30.13%	27,833	67.29%	1,067	2.58%
2024	11,892	31.19%	24,875	65.23%	1,366	3.58%

=== Local government ===
Redondo Beach's City Council elections are held on the first Tuesday after the first Monday in March of odd-numbered years after the City Attorney notified California's Secretary of State of not moving both its City Council and Board of Education elections to a statewide primary or general election starting in 2018. The elections are all-mail instead of in-person.

The current mayor and council members are:

- Mayor: James "Jim" Light
- Council Members:
  - District 1: Brad Waller
  - District 2: Chadwick Castle
  - District 3: Paige Kaluderovic
  - District 4: Zein Obagi Jr.
  - District 5: Scott Behrendt

The City of Redondo Beach is a charter city. Almost two thirds of the residents in Los Angeles County, the majority in Southern California, and a plurality of Californians live in charter cities according to the 2010 US Census. As a charter city, Redondo Beach can adopt amendments to its city charter.

=== State and federal representation ===
In the California State Legislature, Redondo Beach is in the 24th senatorial district, represented by Democrat Ben Allen, and in the 66th Assembly district, represented by Democrat Al Muratsuchi.

In the United States House of Representatives, Redondo Beach is in California's 36th congressional district, represented by Democrat Ted Lieu.

=== Politics ===
In the 2008 presidential election Barack Obama won 59% of the vote and John McCain won 37% of the vote.

== Education ==
The Redondo Beach Unified School District serves the city. Redondo Union High School is the zoned high school, with the adjoining campus of Patricia Dreizler Continuation High School (formerly Redondo Shores Continuation High School) located to the east of the Redondo Union High School main grounds serving as a continuation school. The Redondo Beach Learning Academy, a community day school, houses 9th-12th graders, is located on the South Bay Adult School campus in Redondo Beach. Dreizler continues to be recognized as a California Model Continuation High School. The district's Independent Study Program supports grades 9-12 and is housed on the Patricia Dreizler campus.

Additionally, Redondo Beach has two middle schools, Adams Middle School and Nick G. Parras Middle School (formerly Hillcrest Junior High School). Adams Middle School, located in North Redondo Beach, serves 6th to 8th grade students living in the north Redondo Beach, with Parras Middle School being the designated middle school of central and south Redondo Beach. The city also has eight established elementary schools: Alta Vista, Beryl Heights, Birney, Jefferson, Lincoln, Madison, Tulita and Washington. All twelve schools are evenly divided throughout the North and South areas of Redondo Beach, with five elementary schools and one middle school located in North/Central Redondo Beach; and three elementary schools, one middle school, and the singular designated high school placed in South Redondo Beach. The Redondo Beach Educational Foundation was founded in 1992 and revitalized in 2008.

Residents of Redondo Beach were in South Bay Union High School District until 1993, when it was dissolved.

Valor Christian Academy (formerly Coast Christian School) is in Redondo Beach.

== Infrastructure ==
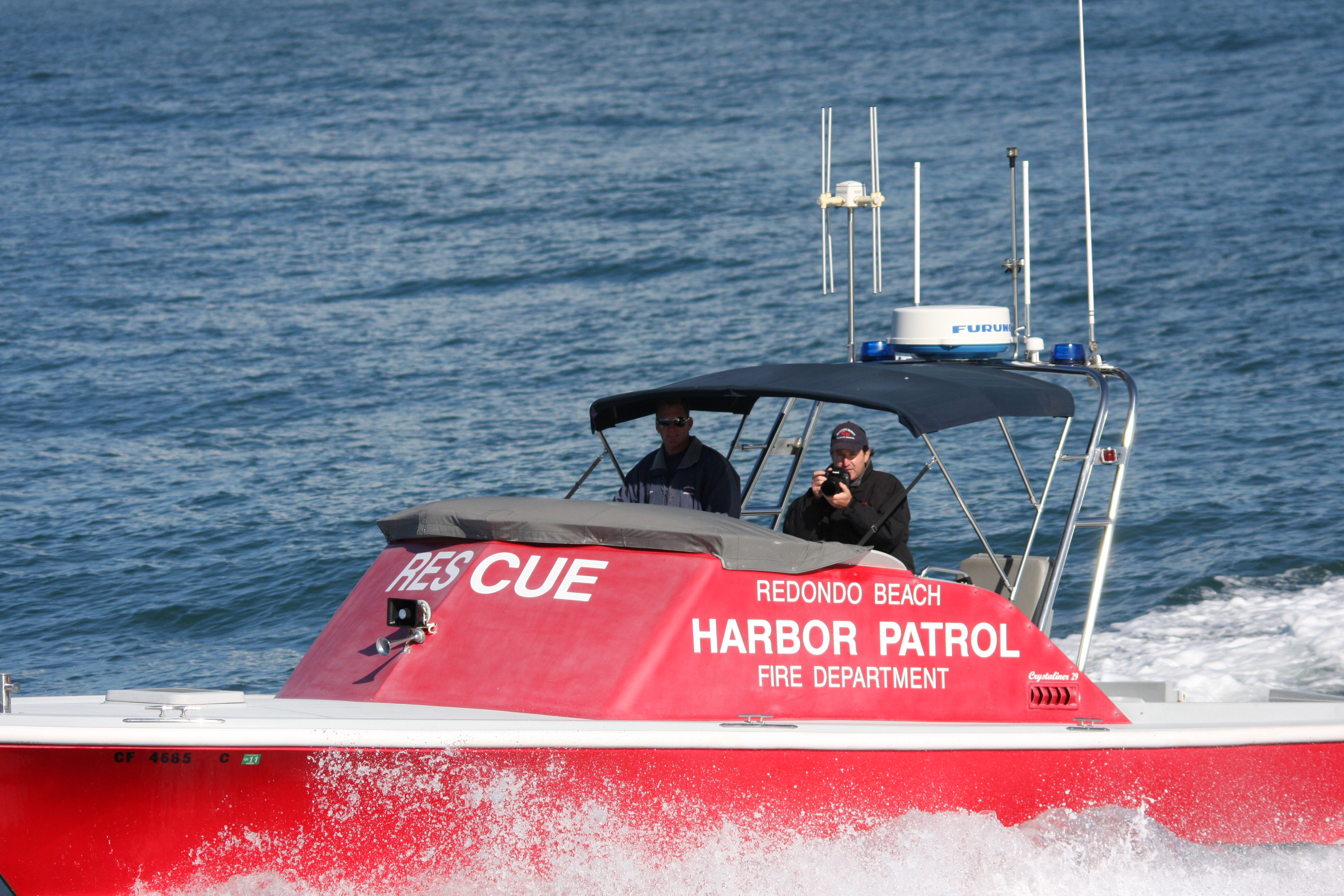
Redondo Beach Fire Department harbor patrol

The United States Postal Service operates the Redondo Beach Post Office at 1201 North Catalina Avenue, the Redondo Beach Station #2 Post Office at 1715 Via El Prado, the North Redondo Beach Post Office at 2215 Artesia Boulevard, and the Galleria Post Office at Suite 377D at 1815 Hawthorne Boulevard.

The Los Angeles County Department of Health Services operates the Torrance Health Center in Harbor Gateway, Los Angeles, near Torrance and serving Redondo Beach.

The Beach Cities Health District, one of 78 California Health Districts, is located in Redondo Beach. Created in 1955, as South Bay Hospital, to provide health and wellness services to the residents of Hermosa Beach, Manhattan Beach, and Redondo Beach. The district took on its current name in 1993. In 2002, Beach Cities Health District opened AdventurePlex, a Manhattan Beach fitness facility for youth and their families of the three beach cities. AdventurePlex has mazes, tunnels, outdoor rock climbing walls, complex ropes courses, and an indoor gymnasium.

=== Redondo Beach Police Department ===
The Redondo Beach Police Department was established in the 1920s. The Police Department consists of 90 sworn members (officers) plus 57 non-sworn members.

=== Redondo Beach Public Library ===
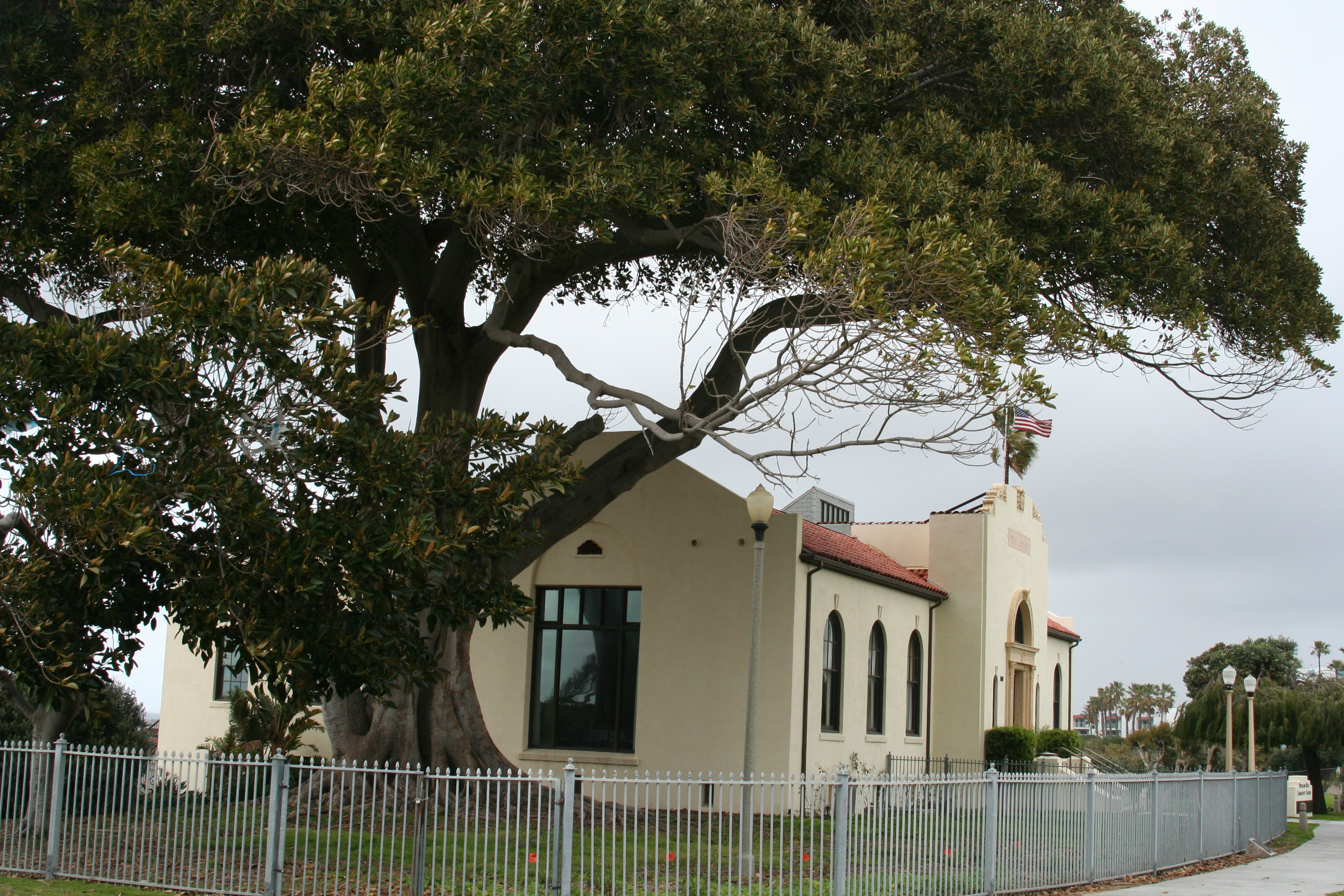
Redondo Beach Public Library

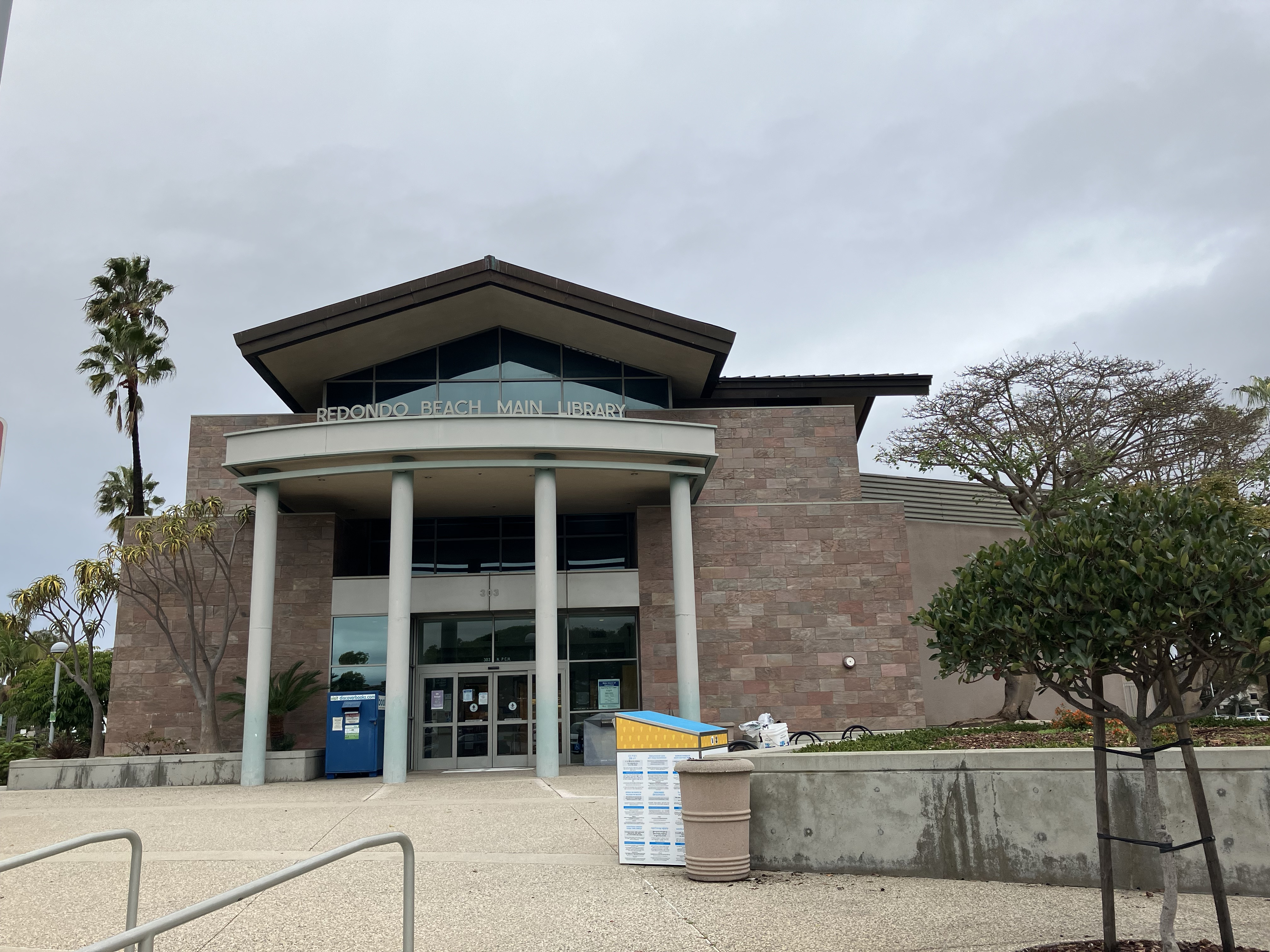
Current Redondo Beach Public Library, main branch, from the civic center entrance

The first library in Redondo Beach began as a reading room in 1895. The first five-member Library Commission for the city was formed in November 1908. The library moved into the then City Hall's west wing in 1909 and eventually filled the entire west wing at 301 Emerald Street. In 1928 the Chamber of Commerce recommended a new library be built on the site previously occupied by the Hotel Redondo in what is now Veterans Park. The Veterans Park Library is a Spanish/Dutch colonial building designed by architect Lovel Bearse Pemberton and opened on July 2, 1930. It was placed on the National Register of Historic Places in 1981. After serving as the Main Library for the city for 60 years, a site adjacent to City Hall was identified for a new, modern Main Library building. The new Main Library for the City of Redondo Beach opened on July 8, 1995, at 303 N. Pacific Coast Highway. A North Branch Library was also established in 1930 and started at the Grant Community Hall, it then moved to its current location at 2000 Artesia Boulevard in 1949. A new North Branch Library was constructed on the site in 2009 and opened its doors on September 28, 2010. The North Branch Library is the first City owned Green building and received Gold LEED certification.

=== Public transportation ===
Redondo Beach is served by Beach Cities Transit and the Redondo Beach K Line station.

Historically, the city was served by the Santa Fe Railroad and Pacific Electric's Venice-Playa del Rey and Redondo Beach via Gardena lines.

== Notable people ==
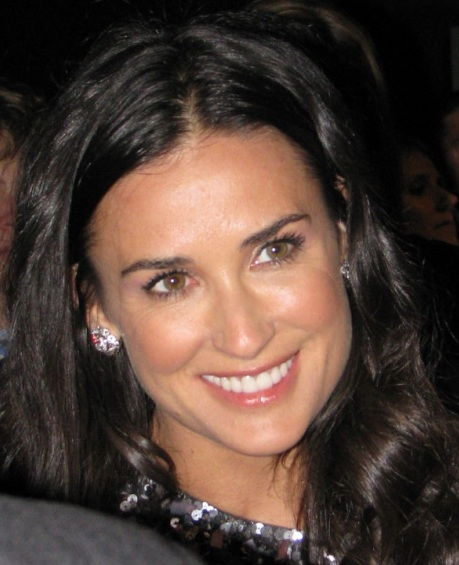
Demi Moore

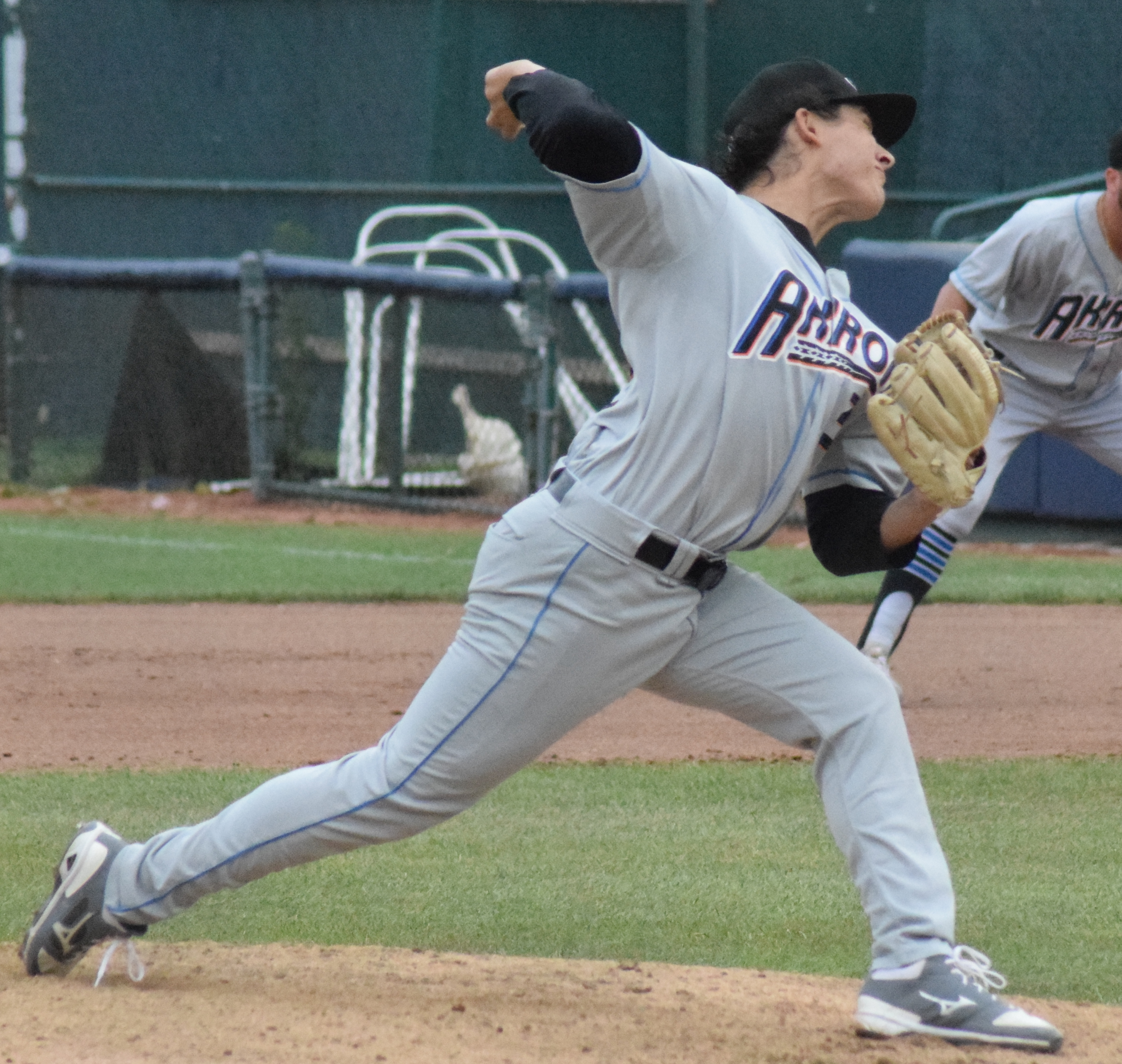
Eli Morgan

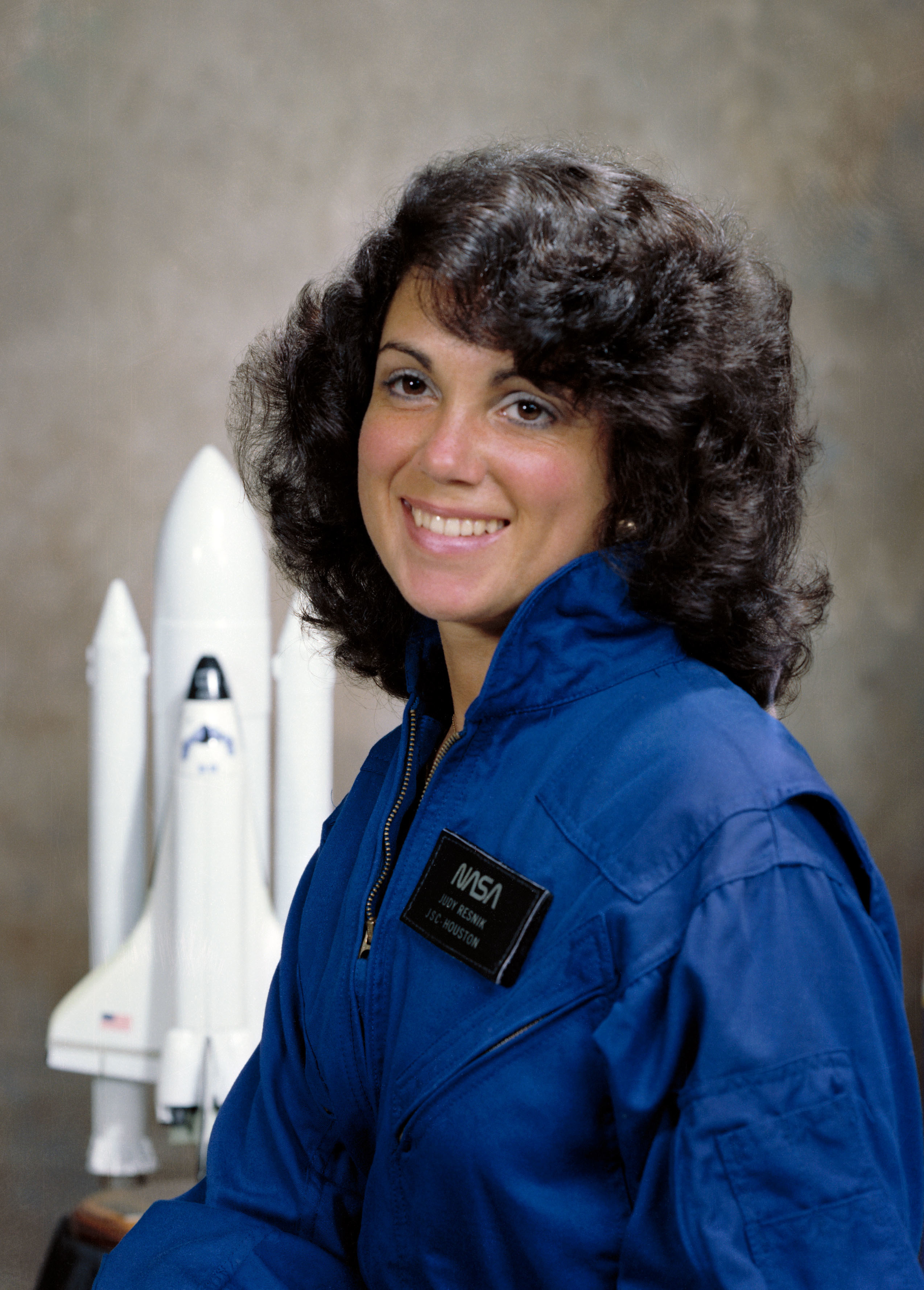
Judith Resnik

- Ron Artest, professional basketball player; resident
- Bill Auberlen, race car driver
- Christopher Bartholomew, musician, vocalist of As Blood Runs Black; resident.
- The Smothers Brothers (Tom, born 1937; Dick, born 1939), musicians and actors; grew up in Redondo Beach and graduated from Redondo Union High School
- Shannon Brown, professional basketball player; resident
- Michael Burns (born 1947), actor on Wagon Train, It's a Man's World, and numerous films; historian, horse breeder; lived in Redondo Beach in 1970s
- Carl C. Cable spent part of his retirement in Redondo Beach.
- Madison Chock, Olympic ice dancer
- Chyna (born Joan Marie Laurer; 1969–2016), professional female wrestler, entertainer, body builder, reality TV star, and adult film actress.
- Christian "CC" Coma (born Christopher Mora, 1985), musician, Black Veil Brides drummer; resident.
- Cameron Crowe, author, gathered research at a public school Redondo Beach for the basis of his novel Fast Times at Ridgemont High.
- Michael Dudikoff (born 1954), actor, born in Redondo Beach.
- Damon Edge, musician of band Chrome; resident; died in his Redondo Beach apartment in 1995
- Carla Esparza (born 1987), professional female mixed martial artist attended Redondo Union High School.
- Amazon Eve, the tallest model in the world at 6 ft 8 in (2.03 m)
- Black Flag, the hardcore punk band, is from Redondo, Manhattan and Hermosa Beach.
- Lou Fleischer, composer
- Jim Fox, professional hockey player, TV analyst; resident
- George Freeth, gave surfing exhibitions in Redondo Beach in 1907
- Lynette "Squeaky" Fromme, former member of the Manson Family, attempted assassin of President Gerald Ford; former resident, Redondo Union High School alumna.
- Pau Gasol, professional basketball player; resident
- Buddy Handleson, actor
- Jesse Heiman, TV personality and actor
- May Hopkins, mayor of Redondo Beach (1928–1931)
- Henry E. Huntington, owned 90 percent of Redondo Beach in 1905 and helped promote surfing by hiring George Freeth away from Abbot Kinney's Venice of America.
- Simone Jackson (born 2003), soccer player
- Casey Jennings, AVP Pro
- Patrick Kearney (born 1940), serial murderer
- Ron Kovic (born 1946), anti-war activist, veteran and writer who was paralyzed in the Vietnam War; best known as the author of his memoir Born on the Fourth of July; resident
- Charles Lindbergh, attended Redondo Union High School
- Traci Lords (born 1968), adult-film actress; attended Redondo Union High School
- Sam Match (1923–2010), tennis player, ranked among the top ten amateur players in the United States
- Allan McCollum (born 1944), contemporary artist; grew up in Redondo Beach and graduated from Aviation High School
- Edwin Mattison McMillan (1907–1991), atomic scientist and Nobel Prize winner; born in Redondo Beach
- Demi Moore (born 1962), actress; attended Redondo Union High School for a year
- Eli Morgan (born 1996), baseball pitcher for the Cleveland Indians
- Jonas Neubauer, Professional Tetris player; resident
- Mike Norris, professional actor
- Jolene Purdy, actress
- Judith Resnik, second American woman in space, killed in the Challenger disaster
- Jereme Rogers, professional skateboarder; resident
- Henry Rollins (born 1961), musician, actor, writer, television and radio host, comedian, Black Flag member; former resident.
- William Starke Rosecrans, a Delaware native, inventor, coal-oil company executive, diplomat, politician, and United States Army Major General during the American Civil War, bought 16,000 acres (65 km^{2}) of land which later became Redondo Beach. Rosecrans Avenue, a major street in northern South Bay, is named after him. He died there at Rancho Sausal Redondo in 1898.
- Tommy Ryman, comedian and resident
- Gwain Noot Sexton (1909–2007) Canadian-born American author, illustrator, visual artist, fashion designer
- Eve Torres, dancer, model, and WWE performer; resident
- Trixx (born 1991) musician, drummer of New Years Day; former resident.
- Rachel Wacholder (born 1975) - model and beach volleyball player
- Kerri Walsh, Beach Volleyball Olympic gold medalist
- Thomas Welsh, professional basketball player; grew up in Redondo Beach
- Paul Westphal (born 1950), professional basketball player and coach; grew up in Redondo Beach, and attended Aviation High School.
- Amy White, swimmer, 1984 Olympics silver medalist, born in Redondo Beach
- Tiffany van Soest, kickboxer and resident
- Slava Voynov, professional hockey player; resident
- Hisaye Yamamoto (born 1921), Japanese-American writer; born in Redondo Beach.
- Inde Navarrette, actor, former resident and sophomore at Redondo Union High School.

== In popular culture ==
Songs & videos

- Patti Smith's song "Redondo Beach", on her 1975 album Horses; covered by Morrissey in 2004 and released as a single in 2005
- Redondo Beach is mentioned in the song "Surfin' U.S.A." by The Beach Boys.
- The Edison Power Plant is the filming location of the music video for the Britney Spears song "(You Drive Me) Crazy".
- The Redondo Fun Factory at the Redondo Beach International Boardwalk is the filming location for the music video of Boys Like Girls' "Love Drunk".

=== Television ===
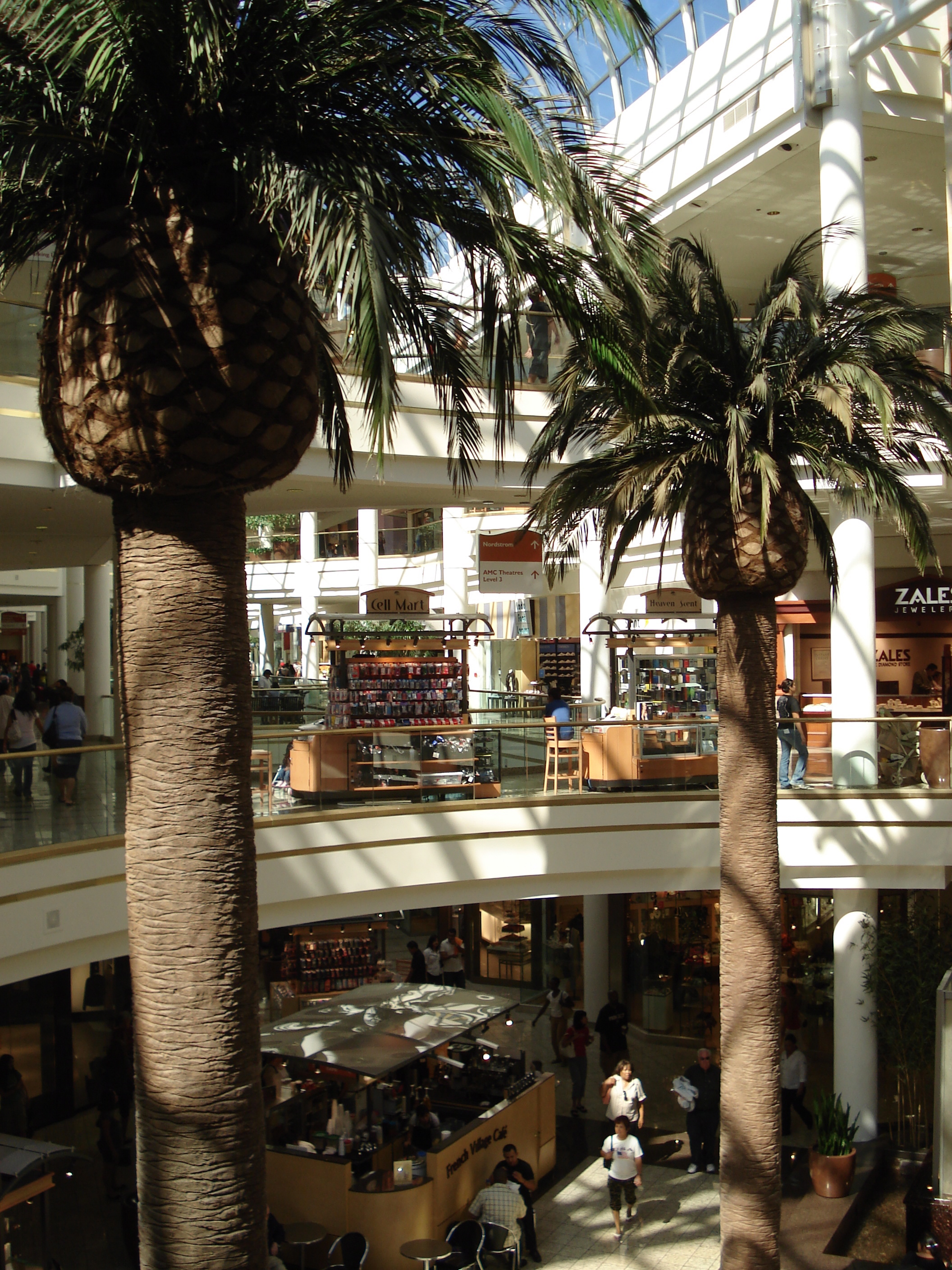
South Bay Galleria, a shopping mall on the border of Lawndale

- The O.C. used the beach and pier as a key filming location.
- As of 2009 Dexter filmed scenes at the pier.
- 24 used the AES power plant in filming many scenes.
- CSI: Miami
- 90210 was filmed in the Riviera Village neighborhood.
- Three seasons of the series Riptide were filmed in King Harbor.
- Even Stevens filmed mall episodes at the South Bay Galleria and used Aviation High School's track field for its outside gym scenes.
- California Dreams
- On the Space Park campus:
  - The Boy Meets Girl episode of My Living Doll with Julie Newmar and Robert Cummings
  - The Cold Hands, Warm Heart episode of The Outer Limits with William Shatner, Lloyd Gough, and Geraldine Brooks
  - The first-season episode of Star Trek: The Original Series titled "Operation -- Annihilate!"
- A few appearances of TruTV's show Speeders
- Extreme Makeover: Home Edition rebuilt a house for the Ripatti-Pearce family when they lived on Pinckard Avenue.
- American Dad references the fact that the Goodyear Blimp is Redondo's official Bird in "Family Time" (S16E19)

=== Film ===
- Parts of Point Break such as the gas station fire/explosion scene took place at the intersection of Beryl and Catalina, and the foot chase past the Dive N' Surf shop.
- The destination of the road-tripping family in Little Miss Sunshine, although Ventura, California, stood in for Redondo at the end.
- Men at Work, which went by the pseudonym Las Playas
- Pirates of the Caribbean: At World's End was filmed off the coast and the Black Pearl, a cursed sea vessel, was moored in the harbor for several weeks in 2006.
- John Travolta's character Vincent Vega in Pulp Fiction lives in Redondo.
- The end of the eponymous race in The Cannonball Run
- The beach scene in Big Momma's House 2
- The fictional Bird of Paradise Motel in The Two Jakes.
- Parts of Tequila Sunrise were on the Esplanade, and Kurt Russell's character wears an RUHS (Redondo Union High School) class ring.
- The Hot Chick (2002), starring Rob Schneider, used the Redondo Union High School football stadium during the scene in which Schneider is pushed down the stadium's bleachers by co-star Anna Faris.
- The beach scene in 1408 is at both Redondo and Hermosa Pier.
- The opening scene of Heat, in which Robert De Niro descends an escalator, was at the Redondo Beach C Line station.
- Five short scenes at Space Park for Countdown (1967 film) (under its working title of Moonshot) with Robert Duvall, James Caan, and Joanna Moore.

== Sister cities ==
- Ensenada, Mexico
- La Paz, Mexico
- Itoman, Japan
- Zhangjiagang, China
