= Redondo Beach Unified School District =

School district in California, United States

Location
- Redondo Beach, California United States
- Coordinates: 33.865582°N 118.361247°W

District information
- Type: Public school
- Grades: K-12
- Established: 1993
- Superintendent: Dr. Nicole Wesley
- Schools: 13
- Budget: $114,016,112
- NCES District ID: 0600032

Students and staff
- Students: 9,538
- Teachers: 486
- Student–teacher ratio: 19.62

Other information
- Website: rbusd.org

Redondo Beach Unified School District is a school district with approximately 10,000 students headquartered in Redondo Beach, California. The school district consists of eight elementary schools, two middle schools, one high school, one continuation school, and one adult school.

RBUSD serves the city of Redondo Beach. In addition, residents of Hermosa Beach may choose to attend Redondo Union High School of RBUSD or the Mira Costa High School of the Manhattan Beach Unified School District.

== History ==
RBUSD was established in 1993 by the consolidation of Redondo Beach City School District and the South Bay Union High School District, which covered Redondo Beach and two other municipalities. Residents of the latter voted to dissolve it in 1992.

== Superintendent ==
- Dr. Nicole Wesley

== Assistant Superintendents ==
- Dr. Annette Alpern, Deputy Superintendent, Administrative Services
- Dr. Allison Garland, Assistant Superintendent, Educational Services
- Roy Lopez Jr., Executive Director, Educational Services
- Dr. Nick Stephany, Assistant Superintendent, Human Resources
- Danielle Duncan-Bernstein, Executive Director, Special Education
- Susana Garcia, Chief Technology Officer, Information Technology

== Board of education ==
- Dan Elder: Board President
- Byung Cho: Board Vice President
- Raymur Flinn: Board Clerk
- Rachel Silverman Nemeth: Board Member
- Hanh Archer: Board Member
- Keely Gould: Student Board Member

Elections are held at the same time as the Redondo Beach City Council elections on the first Tuesday after the first Monday in March of odd-numbered years.

== Schools ==
=== High schools ===
- Redondo Union High School
- Patricia Dreizler Continuation High School

=== Middle schools ===
- Adams Middle School
- Parras Middle School

=== Primary school ===
- Alta Vista Elementary School
- Beryl Heights Elementary School
- Birney Elementary School
- Jefferson Elementary School
- Lincoln Elementary School
- Madison Elementary School
- Tulita Elementary School
- Washington Elementary School

=== Alternative Education ===
- RBUSD Independent Study
- RBUSD Learning Academy

=== Adult Education ===
- South Bay Adult School

=== Child Development Centers ===
- Child Development Centers - CDC
