= Redondo Union High School =

Public school in Redondo Beach, California

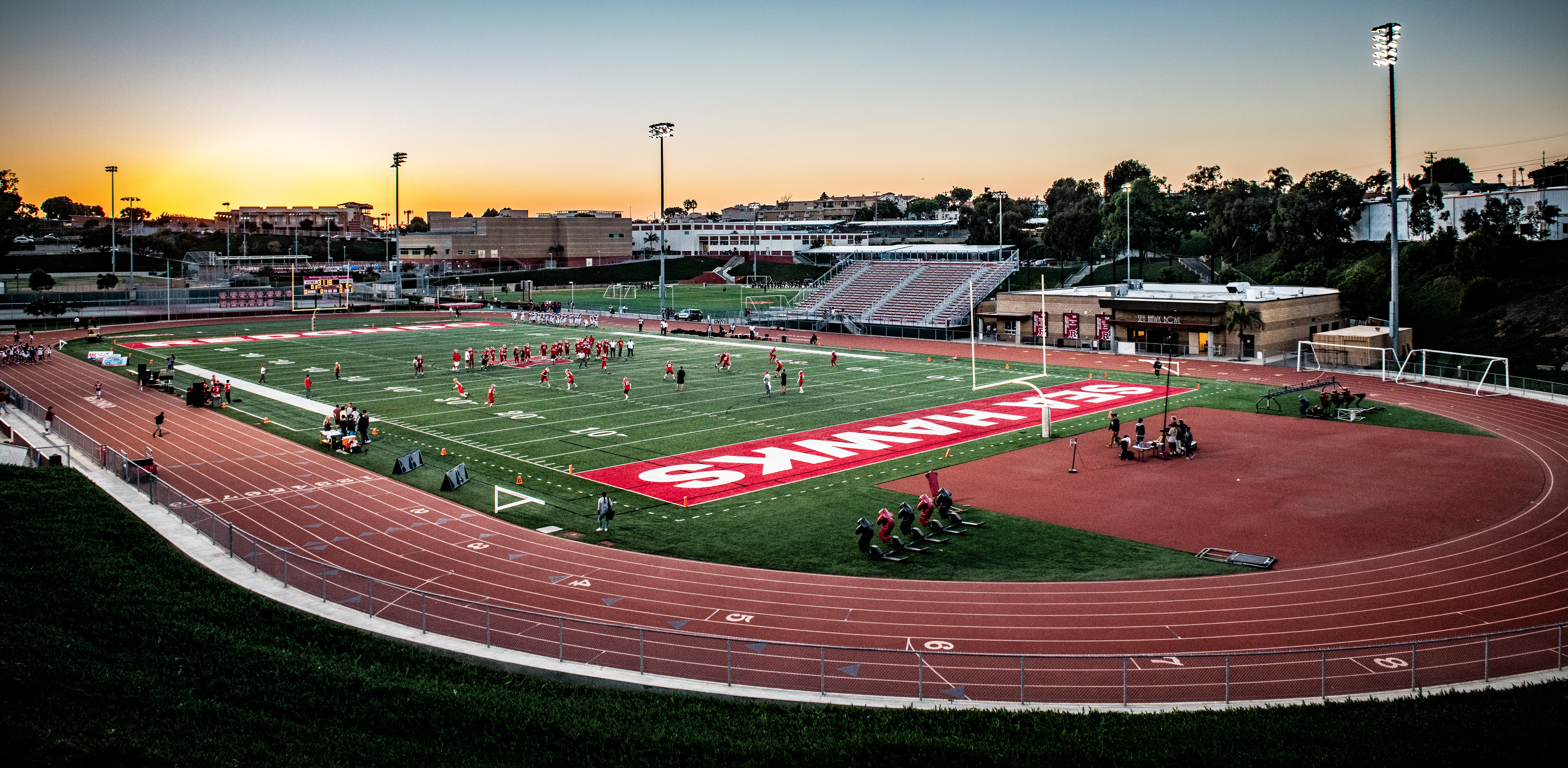

Location
- One Sea Hawk Way; Redondo Beach, California, U.S. 33.8461°N 118.3840°W

Information
- Type: Public
- Established: 1905
- School district: Redondo Beach Unified School District (1993-); South Bay Union High School District (-1993)
- Principal: Marvin Brown
- Teaching staff: 116.86 (FTE)
- Grades: 9-12
- Enrollment: 2,921
- Student to teacher ratio: 25.42
- Campus size: 62.5 acres (25.3 ha)
- Colors: Red and White
- Mascot: Sea Hawk
- Rival: Mira Costa High School
- Publication: High Tide (Newspaper); RUTV (Newscast)
- Yearbook: Pilot
- Website: redondounion.org

Redondo Union High School is a four-year public high school in Redondo Beach, California. The high school is a part of the Redondo Beach Unified School District. All residents of Redondo Beach are zoned to Redondo Union. Residents of neighboring Hermosa Beach may choose to attend Redondo Union or Mira Costa High School.

== History ==
Redondo Union High School was organized in the summer of 1905. The first classes were held in two upstairs rooms of the Masonic Building in Redondo Beach. In December of that same year, a site known as Old Chautauqua Place was selected as the location for the school.

In 1939, the Science Building was dedicated. Residents of Manhattan Beach attended Redondo Union until 1950, when Mira Costa High School opened.

Redondo Union High School was a part of the South Bay Union High School District until 1993, when it dissolved.

Since opening in 1905, the school's campus has expanded to an overall area of 56 acres (230,000 m^{2}).

== Demographics ==
As of 2026, Redondo Union High School has a student population of 2,921 that is 0.1% Native American, 0.2% unknown, 0.2% Pacific Islander, 3.9% black, 13.1% Asian, 14.6% multiracial, 25.8% Hispanic, and 42.1% white.

== Academics ==
As of 2026, Redondo Union High School's graduation rate is 95%.

In 2025, the Redondo Union High School Chinese Program received the National Outstanding K-16 Chinese Program Award by the Chinese Language Association of Secondary-Elementary Schools (CLASS). This national award recognizes programs that demonstrate excellence in curriculum innovation, student achievement, community engagement, and sustainable development in Chinese education.

== Athletics ==
Redondo Union High School offers fall and spring sports and has won championships in several divisions. The Boys' Basketball team won the Division II CIF State Championship in 2013. In 2014 and 2015, the Girls' Volleyball team won the CIF State Championship. Most recently, in 2024, the Boys' Volleyball team won their first CIF Division II State Championship.

=== Fall sports ===
- Boys Beach Volleyball
- Boys Water Polo
- Girls Tennis
- Girls Volleyball
- Girls Golf
- R.U.H.S. Cross-country Team
- Cheerleading
- Football
- Surfing
- Marching Band/Dance Guard

=== Winter sports ===
- Boys Basketball
- Girls Basketball
- Wrestling
- Girls Water Polo
- Boys Soccer
- Girls Soccer
- Surfing
- Rugby

=== Spring sports ===
- Boys Tennis
- Boys Volleyball
- Boys Golf
- Boys Lacrosse
- Girls Lacrosse
- R.U.H.S Track & Field Team
- Baseball
- Softball
- Swimming

== Media appearances ==
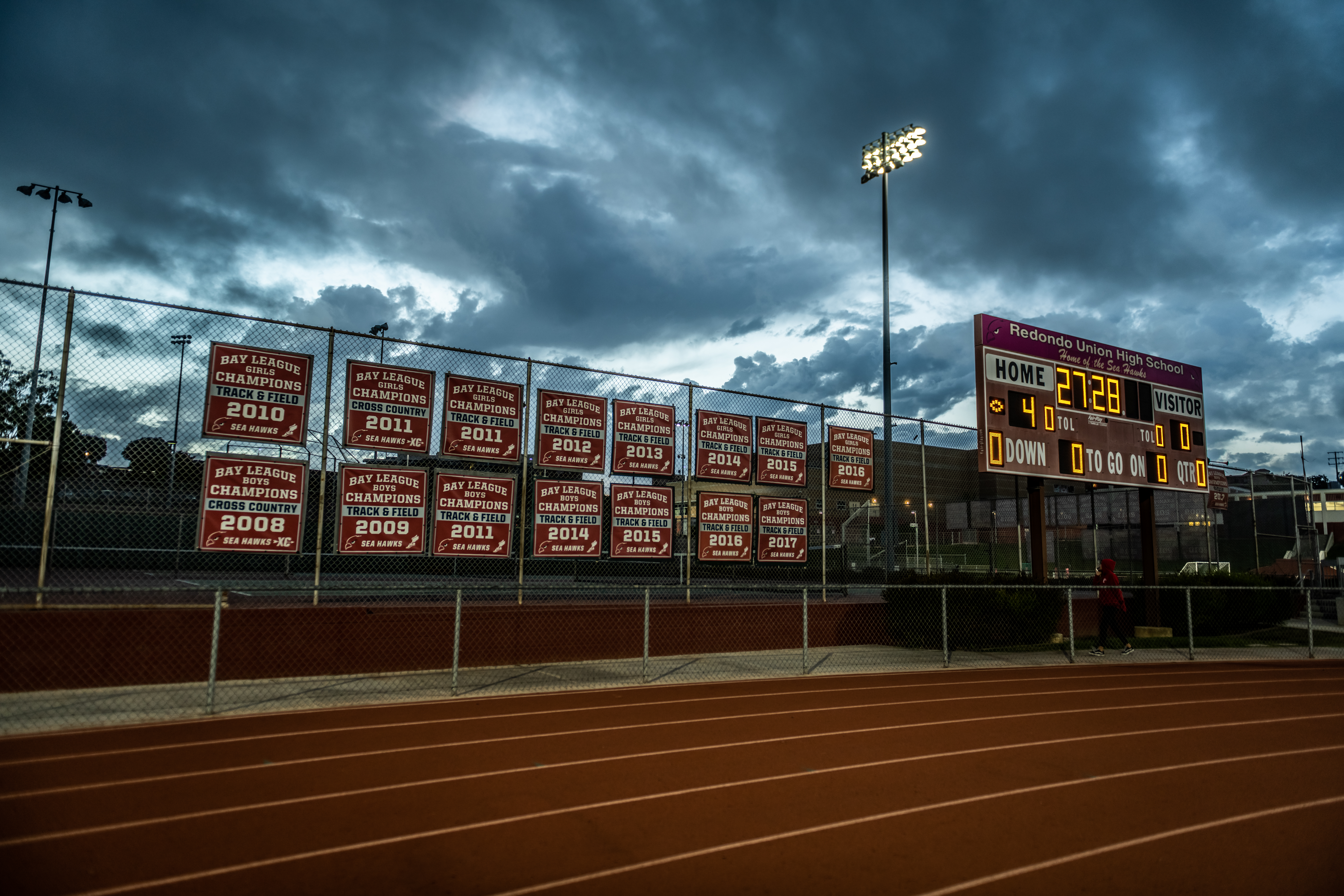
Championship posters at Redondo Union High School

=== Film ===
- Redondo Union High School was one of the primary filming locations for the 2002 film The Hot Chick.
- Kurt Russell wore an RUHS senior class ring in the 1988 film Tequila Sunrise.

=== Television ===
- In Season 3, Episode 27 of The Beverly Hillbillies, Alan Reed Jr. stepped out of a car in the Clampetts' driveway, stared at the front of the mansion and exclaimed, "Man! This place looks like Redondo High!"

== Notable alumni ==
- Iris Cummings, World War II aviator and Olympic swimmer
- Jim Allison, AFL player for the San Diego Chargers
- Yaasmeen Bedart-Ghani, USA international volleyball player
- Tyler Bindon, New Zealand soccer player for Reading F.C. and the New Zealand men's national football team
- Dez Cadena, singer for Black Flag
- Dominik Eberle, NFL kicker
- Keith Ellison, NFL player for the Buffalo Bills
- Kevin Ellison, NFL player for the San Diego Chargers
- Morgan Ensberg, MLB player for the New York Yankees
- Carla Esparza, professional mixed martial artist and inaugural 2014 UFC Strawweight Champion
- Lynette "Squeaky" Fromme, member of the Manson family
- Nona Gaye, singer-songwriter and daughter of Marvin Gaye
- Lynn Hoyem, NFL player for the Dallas Cowboys and Philadelphia Eagles
- Jermar Jefferson, NFL player for the Minnesota Vikings (transferred)
- Charles Lindbergh, pilot and the first to cross the Atlantic Ocean nonstop via aircraft (transferred)
- Traci Lords, actress (dropped out)
- Byron McMackin, drummer for Pennywise
- Demi Moore, actress (transferred to Fairfax High School after freshman year)
- Inde Navarrette, actress
- Ty Page, professional skateboarder
- Donald Peterman, Academy Award-nominated cinematographer
- The Smothers Brothers, comedians
- Ted Stevens, former United States Senator for Alaska
- Dijon Thompson, NBA player for the Phoenix Suns and Atlanta Hawks
- Sean Reynolds, MLB player for the San Diego Padres
- Sean Rosenthal, Olympic beach volleyball player
- Claire Wineland, activist, author, and speaker
- Wendell White, professional international basketball player
