= Hermosa =

Hermosa (Spanish for "beautiful" or "gorgeous") may refer to:

== Animals ==
- Dismidila hermosa, moths
- Guerreran climbing salamander (Spanish: Bolitoglossa hermosa)
- Hermosa (horse) (born 2016), winner of the 2019 1000 Guineas Stakes
- Hermosa (spider), an Indonesian genus of spiders
- Montfortia hermosa, sea snails
- Peristichia hermosa, sea snails
- Sparganothina hermosa, moths

== Films ==
- Beautiful Youth (Spanish: Hermosa juventud)
- Hermosa niña
- La noche más hermosa

== People ==
- José Hermosa (born 1989), Spanish footballer
- José María Bravo Fernández-Hermosa (1917–2009), Spanish Republican fighter pilot
- Juan de Liermo Hermosa (1522–1582), Spanish bishop
- Juan Fernando Hermosa (1976–1996), Ecuadorian teen serial killer
- Kathleen Hermosa (born 1981), Filipino actress
- Kristine Hermosa (born 1983), Filipino actress; Kathleen's sister
- Manuel Vidal Hermosa (1901–1965), Spanish footballer
- Martín Cárdenas Hermosa (1899–1973), Bolivian botanist
- Tomás Marín de Poveda, 1st Marquis of Cañada Hermosa (1650–1703), Spanish colonel
- Wilson Hermosa González (1943–2008), Bolivian musician

== Places ==
=== Argentina ===
- Loma Hermosa, town

=== Colombia ===
- Las Hermosas National Natural Park
- Vista Hermosa, Meta, town

=== Costa Rica ===
- Playa Hermosa-Punta Mala Wildlife Refuge, nature reserve

=== Dominican Republic ===
- Villa Hermosa, town

=== Guatemala ===
- Colegio Bilingüe Vista Hermosa, private school

=== Mexico ===
- Colegio Vista Hermosa, private school
- Instituto Rosedal Vista Hermosa, private school
- La Trinidad Vista Hermosa, town

=== Panama ===
- Costa Hermosa, district

=== Peru ===
- Pampa Hermosa District, Satipo
- Pampa Hermosa District, Ucayali
- Pampa Hermosa National Sanctuary
- Punta Hermosa, district

=== Philippines ===
- Hermosa, Bataan

=== United States ===
- Hermosa Beach, California
  - Beach Cities Greenway, rail trail
  - Hermosa Beach City School District
  - Hermosa Beach Pier
- Hermosa, Colorado
  - Hermosa Bungalow Historic District
  - Hermosa Creek
  - Hermosa Creek Wilderness
- Hermosa, Chicago, Illinois
  - Hermosa station, a former commuter rail station in Chicago
- Hermosa Inn
- Hermosa, New Mexico
- Hermosa, South Dakota
  - Hermosa Masonic Lodge
- Hermosa, Virginia
- Hermosa, Wyoming

==== California ====
- Edward R. Roybal Learning Center (formerly Belmont Learning Center, Vista Hermosa) in Los Angeles
- Villa Hermosa (Palm Springs), complex in Palm Springs
- Vista Hermosa Natural Park in Los Angeles

=== Uruguay ===
- Playa Hermosa, Uruguay, resort

== Other uses ==
- Anderson v. City of Hermosa Beach, decision on tattoo laws
- Hermosa Beach oil drilling controversy
- Hermosa Festival
- Hermosa Group, formations
- Hermosa (slave ship), a schooner in the coastwise slave trade
- Hermosa Soberana, anthem
  - Hermosa–Duhat–Balintawak Transmission Line; see Mexico–Hermosa Transmission Line § Route description

== See also ==
- Pampa Hermosa District (disambiguation)
- Vista Hermosa (disambiguation)
