= Hacienda La Avellana Mixed Wildlife Refuge =

Protected area in Costa Rica

- Refugio de Vida Silvestre Hacienda La Avellana
- Location within Costa Rica
- Location: Costa Rica
- Coordinates: 9.864°N 84.550°W
- Area: 5.00 square kilometres (1.93 sq mi)
- Established: 2 May 1988
- Governing body: National System of Conservation Areas (SINAC)

Hacienda La Avellana Mixed Wildlife Refuge (Spanish: Refugio de Vida Silvestre Hacienda La Avellana), is a protected area in Costa Rica, managed under the Central Pacific Conservation Area, it was created in 1988 by decree 18186-MIRENEM.
