= Dismidila gnoma =

Scientific classification
- Kingdom: Animalia
- Phylum: Arthropoda
- Class: Insecta
- Order: Lepidoptera
- Family: Crambidae
- Genus: Dismidila
- Species: D. gnoma

Binomial name
- Dismidila gnoma Munroe, 1970

Species of moth

Dismidila gnoma is a moth in the family Crambidae. It was described by Eugene G. Munroe in 1970. It is found in Guatemala.
