= Redondo Hill Private Wildlife Refuge =

Protected area in Costa Rica

- Refugio de Vida Silvestre Privado Cerro Redondo
- Location within Costa Rica
- Location: Costa Rica
- Coordinates: 9.599°N 84.184°W
- Area: 6.80 square kilometres (2.63 sq mi)
- Established: 12 August 1997
- Governing body: National System of Conservation Areas (SINAC)

Redondo Hill Private Wildlife Refuge (Spanish: Refugio de Vida Silvestre Privado Cerro Redondo), is a protected area in Costa Rica, managed under the Central Pacific Conservation Area, it was created in 1997 by decree 26202-MINAE.
