= Contamana =

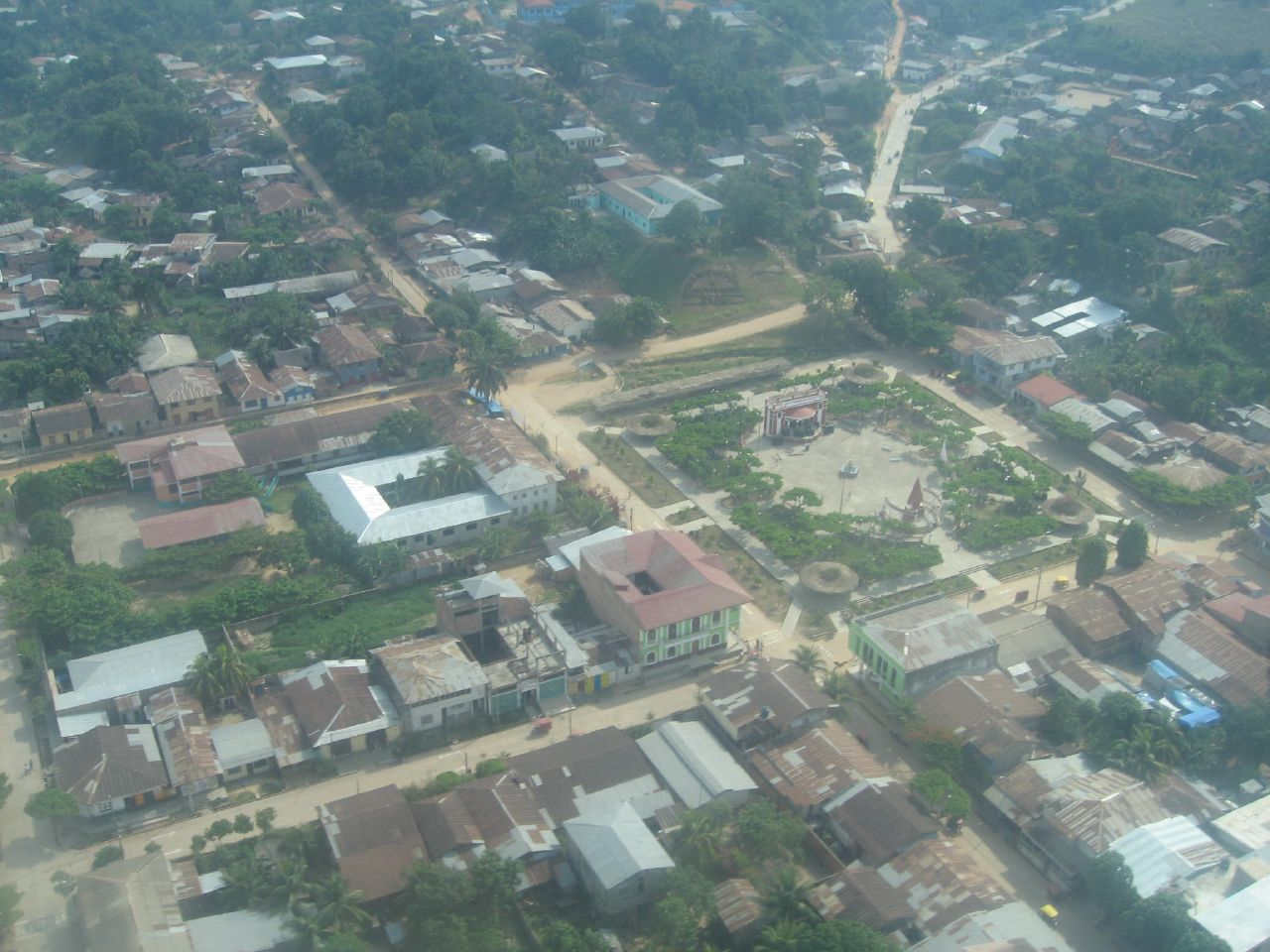
- View of the town

- Location in Peru
- Coordinates: 7.350528°S 75.009189°W
- Country: Peru
- Region: Loreto
- Province: Ucayali
- Elevation: 134 m (440 ft)

Population (2007)
  - Total: 15,036
- Time zone: UTC-5 (PET)
- Climate: Af
- Website: www.muniucayali.gob.pe

Contamana is a town in the Loreto Region in northeastern Peru. It is the capital of both Ucayali Province and Contamana District, and has an urban population of about 15,036 (as of 2007). It has one airport.

== Climate ==
Climate data for Contamana, elevation 157 m (515 ft), (1991–2020)
| Month | Jan | Feb | Mar | Apr | May | Jun | Jul | Aug | Sep | Oct | Nov | Dec | Year |
|---|---|---|---|---|---|---|---|---|---|---|---|---|---|
| Mean daily maximum °C (°F) | 32.5 (90.5) | 31.9 (89.4) | 31.3 (88.3) | 31.3 (88.3) | 30.8 (87.4) | 30.4 (86.7) | 30.8 (87.4) | 32.3 (90.1) | 32.9 (91.2) | 33.1 (91.6) | 33.0 (91.4) | 32.8 (91.0) | 31.9 (89.4) |
| Mean daily minimum °C (°F) | 20.2 (68.4) | 20.0 (68.0) | 20.0 (68.0) | 19.7 (67.5) | 19.3 (66.7) | 19.0 (66.2) | 18.6 (65.5) | 19.0 (66.2) | 19.6 (67.3) | 20.1 (68.2) | 20.3 (68.5) | 20.4 (68.7) | 19.7 (67.4) |
| Average precipitation mm (inches) | 147.2 (5.80) | 173.3 (6.82) | 207.7 (8.18) | 177.8 (7.00) | 147.7 (5.81) | 79.8 (3.14) | 69.9 (2.75) | 73.2 (2.88) | 109.5 (4.31) | 145.2 (5.72) | 158.1 (6.22) | 126.9 (5.00) | 1,616.3 (63.63) |
Source: National Meteorology and Hydrology Service of Peru
