= Tivives Protected Zone =

Protected area in Costa Rica

- Zona Protectora Tivives
- IUCN category VI (protected area with sustainable use of natural resources)
- Location within Costa Rica
- Location: Costa Rica
- Coordinates: 9.898°N 84.699°W
- Area: 24.97 square kilometres (9.64 sq mi)
- Established: 2 June 1986
- Governing body: National System of Conservation Areas (SINAC)

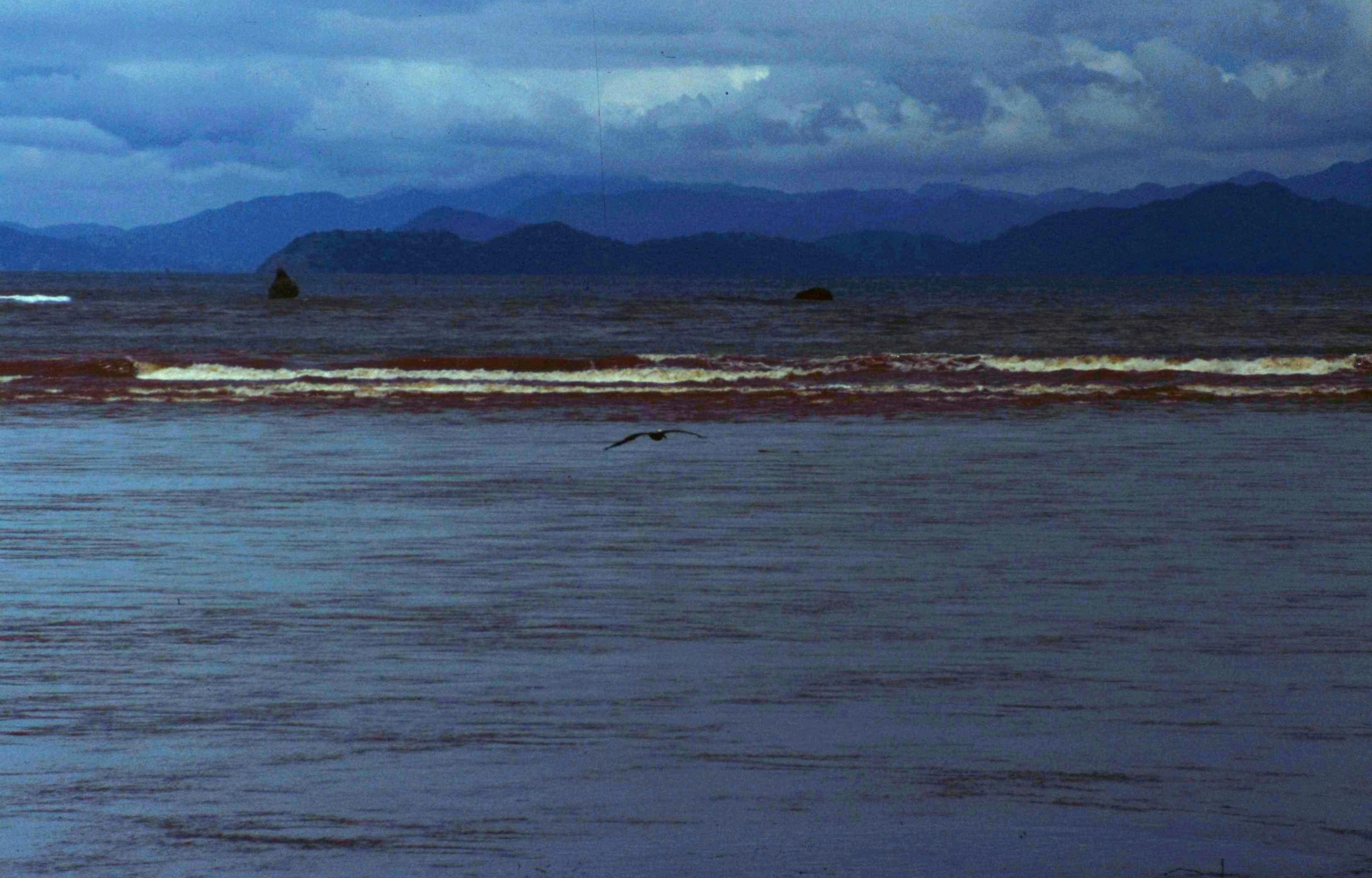

Tivives Protected Zone (Spanish: Zona Protectora Tivives), is a protected area in Costa Rica, managed under the Central Pacific Conservation Area, it was created in 1986 by decree 17023-MAG.
