= Portalón Mixed Wildlife Refuge =

Protected area in Costa Rica

- Refugio de Vida Silvestre Mixto Portalón
- IUCN category IV (habitat/species management area)
- Location within Costa Rica
- Location: Costa Rica
- Coordinates: 9.384°N 83.984°W
- Area: 4.49 square kilometres (1.73 sq mi)
- Established: 23 May 1996
- Governing body: National System of Conservation Areas (SINAC)

Portalón Mixed Wildlife Refuge (Spanish: Refugio de Vida Silvestre Mixto Portalón), is a protected area in Costa Rica, managed under the Central Pacific Conservation Area, it was created in 1996 by decree 25139-MINAE.
