= Dismidila halia =

Scientific classification
- Kingdom: Animalia
- Phylum: Arthropoda
- Class: Insecta
- Order: Lepidoptera
- Family: Crambidae
- Genus: Dismidila
- Species: D. halia

Binomial name
- Dismidila halia (H. Druce, 1900)

Synonyms
- Midila halia H. Druce, 1900

Species of moth

Dismidila halia is a moth in the family Crambidae. It was described by Herbert Druce in 1900. It is found in Colombia.
