= Dismidila vivashae =

Scientific classification
- Kingdom: Animalia
- Phylum: Arthropoda
- Class: Insecta
- Order: Lepidoptera
- Family: Crambidae
- Genus: Dismidila
- Species: D. vivashae

Binomial name
- Dismidila vivashae Schaus, 1933

Species of moth

Dismidila vivashae is a moth in the family Crambidae. It was described by Schaus in 1933. It is found in Colombia.
