= Padre Marquez District =

Coordinates: 7.9335°S 75.3915°W

Padre Marquez
- District
- Location of Padre Marquez in the Ucayali Province
- Country: Peru
- Region: Loreto
- Province: Ucayali
- Founded: July 2, 1943
- Capital: Tiruntan

Government
  - Mayor: Juan Maldonado Urquia

Area
  - Total: 2,475.66 km^{2} (955.86 sq mi)
- Elevation: 164 m (538 ft)

Population (2005 census)
  - Total: 5,466
  - Density: 2.208/km^{2} (5.718/sq mi)
- Time zone: UTC-5 (PET)
- UBIGEO: 160603

Padre Marquez District is one of six districts of the province Ucayali in Peru.
