= Orellana, Peru =

- Village
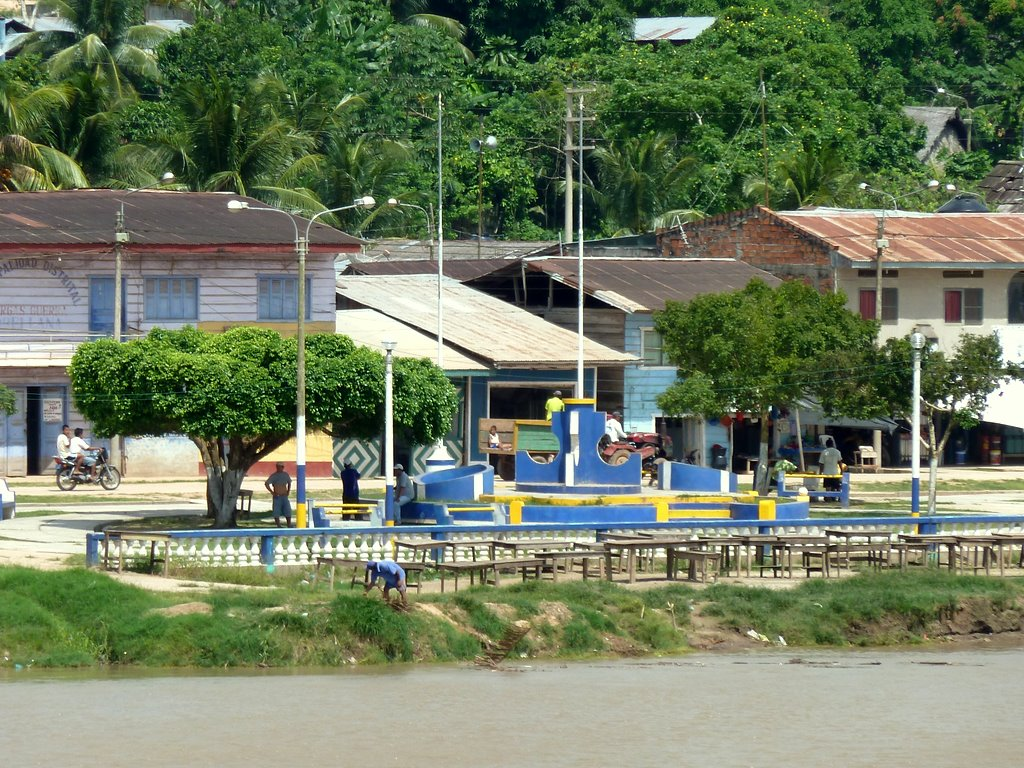
- La plaza de Armas in Orellana

- Location of Orellana in Peru
- Coordinates: 6.9117°S 75.1575°W
- Country: Peru
- Region: Loreto
- Province: Ucayali
- District: Vargas Guerra

Population (2017)
  - Total: 5,432
- Time zone: UTC-5 (PET)

Orellana is a town in the District of Vargas Guerra of which it is the seat within Ucayali Province of Peru's Department of Loreto. It is located along the Ucayali River 660 kilometers north of Lima.

The town is named after Francisco de Orellana who, in 1542, became the first European to discover the Amazon River.

The town was visited by Peruvian president Juan Velasco Alvarado in 1972 during a ten day trip through the jungle regions of Peru to celebrate the fourth anniversary of his government.

As of the 2017 census, the population of the town was 5,432.
