= Ucayali province =

Coordinates: 7.348513°S 75.005752°W

Ucayali
- Province
- Location of Ucayali in the Loreto Region
- Country: Peru
- Region: Loreto
- Founded: October 13, 1900
- Capital: Contamana

Government
  - Mayor: Luis Octavio Zuta Rengifo

Area
  - Total: 29,293.47 km^{2} (11,310.27 sq mi)
- Elevation: 134 m (440 ft)

Population
  - Total: 57,669
  - Density: 1.9687/km^{2} (5.0988/sq mi)
- UBIGEO: 1606

Ucayali is one of the eight provinces in the Loreto Region of Peru. It was created on October 13, 1900, by president Eduardo López de Romaña. Its territory is mostly flat except for the Ganso Azul mountain range in its eastern part. This province is not the same nor part of the Ucayali Department although they share the same name.

== Political division ==
The province is divided into six districts.

- Contamana (Contamana)
- Inahuaya (Inahuaya)
- Padre Marquez (Tiruntan)
- Pampa Hermosa (Pampa Hermosa)
- Sarayacu (Dos de Mayo)
- Vargas Guerra (Orellana)
