= Beach Cities =

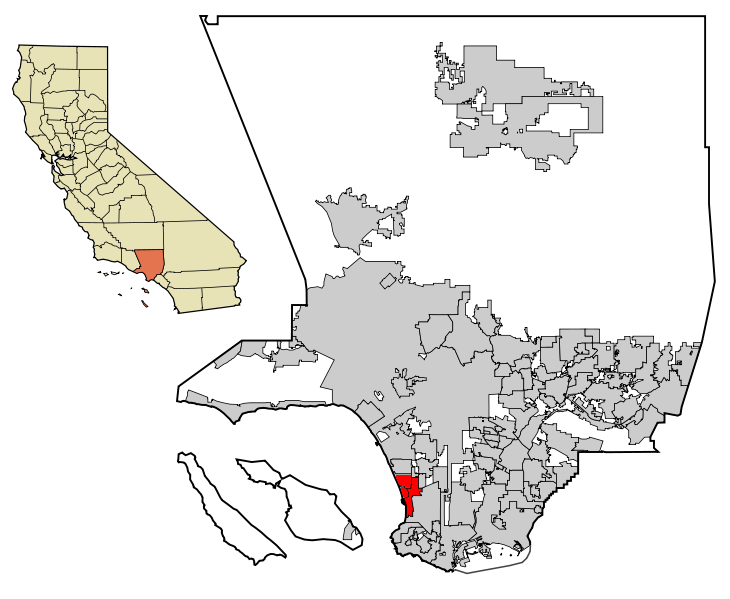
- Location of the Beach Cities (Hermosa Beach, Manhattan Beach, and Redondo Beach) in Los Angeles County, California.
- State: California
- County: Los Angeles County
- City: City of Hermosa Beach, California; City of Manhattan Beach, California; City of Redondo Beach, California

Area
  - Total: 22.70 sq mi (58.80 km^{2})
  - Land: 11.65 sq mi (30.17 km^{2})
  - Water: 11.05 sq mi (28.63 km^{2}) 48.70%

Population (2020)
  - Total: 126,810

The Beach Cities are a collection of three independently incorporated oceanfront cities in Los Angeles County south of El Segundo and north of the Palos Verdes Peninsula, comprising the cities of Manhattan Beach, Hermosa Beach, and Redondo Beach. They occupy the majority of the south end of Santa Monica Bay. Neighboring Torrance also shares a strip of beach property in the neighborhood of Torrance Beach, but the city of Torrance is not generally recognized as part of the group.

== Description ==
The three cities share public agencies including the Beach Cities Transit District (with El Segundo) and the Beach Cities Health District. All three are known for their beaches and municipal piers. They are popular with swimmers, surfers, bodyboarders, and other beachgoers. The Marvin Braude Bike Trail runs along the beaches and is used for pedestrian and cyclist transportation between the cities, as well as recreational cycling, running and rollerblading. The southern terminus of the trail is in Torrance. The trail and beach continues north into El Segundo.

== See also ==
- Redondo Beach pier
- Hermosa Beach pier
- Manhattan Beach pier

== Gallery ==
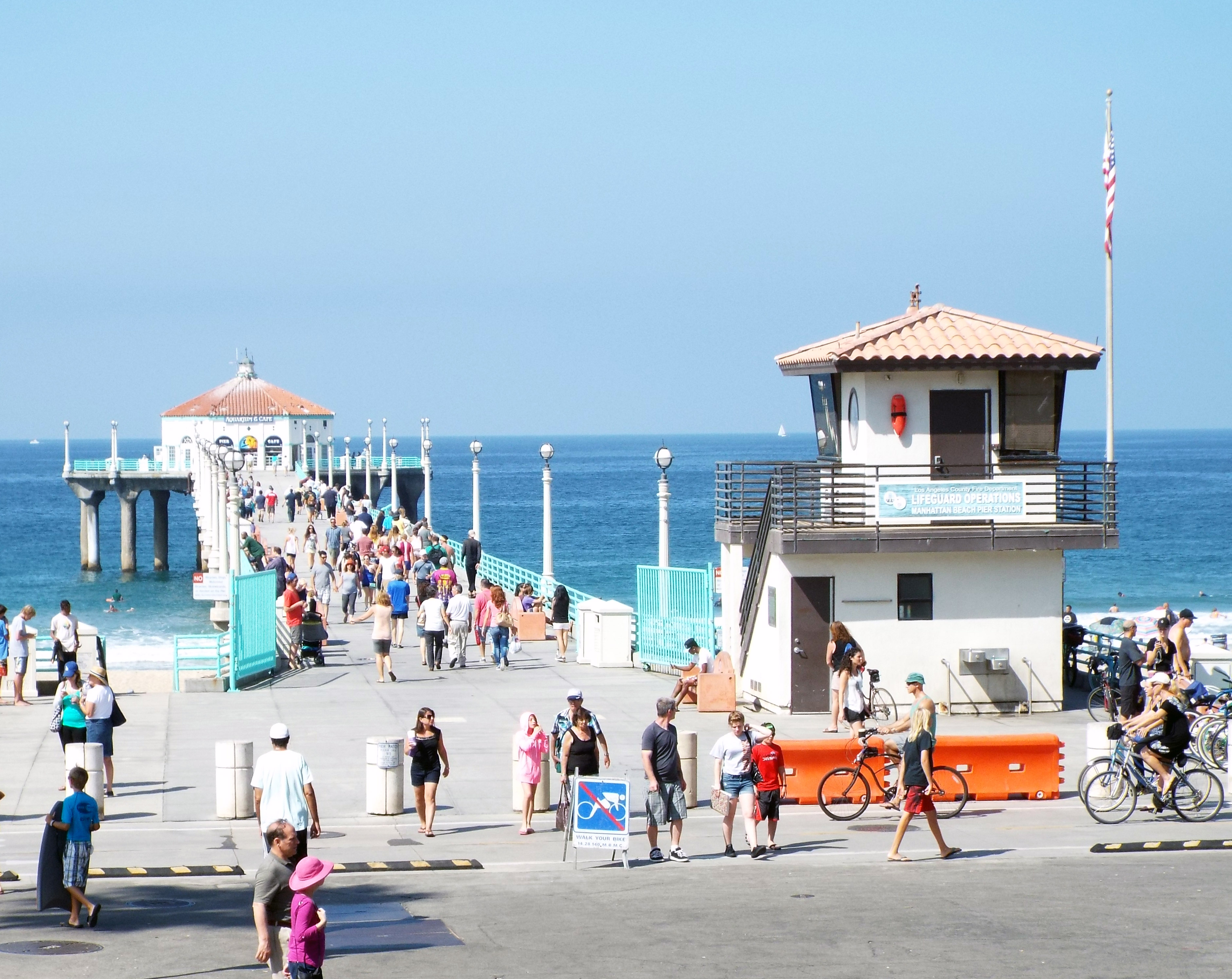
Manhattan Beach pier

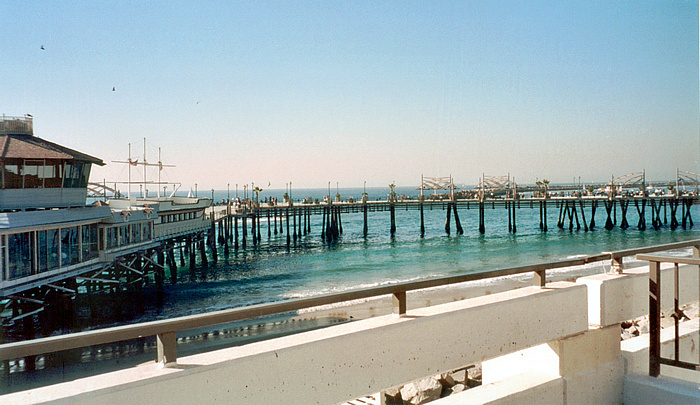
Redondo Beach pier

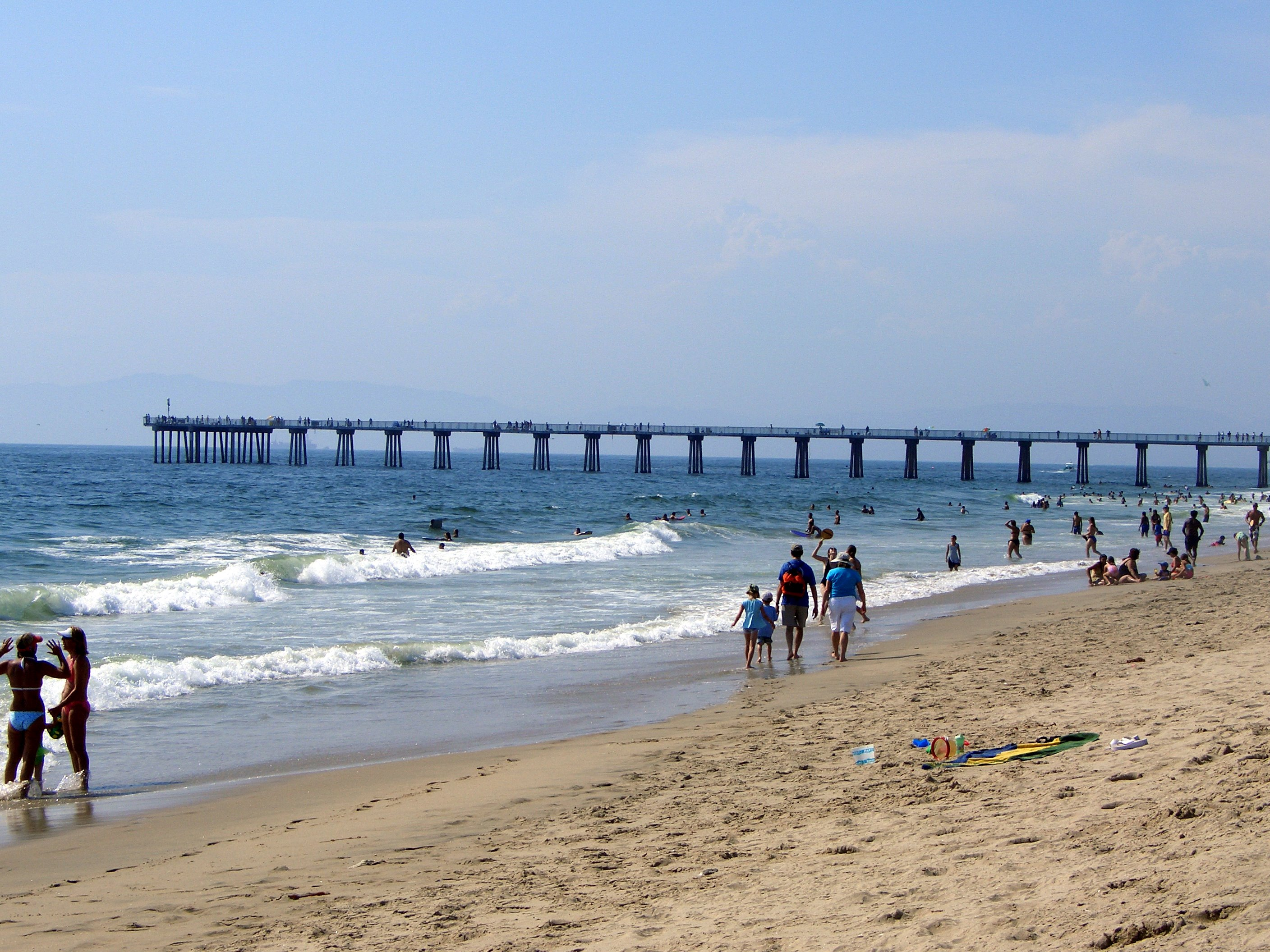
Hermosa Beach pier
