= Inahuaya District =

Coordinates: 7.1182°S 75.2660°W

Inahuaya
- District
- Location of Inahuaya in the Ucayali province
- Country: Peru
- Region: Loreto
- Province: Ucayali
- Founded: February 16, 1962
- Capital: Inahuaya

Government
  - Mayor: Jaime Salomon Vasquez Falcon

Area
  - Total: 646.04 km^{2} (249.44 sq mi)
- Elevation: 131 m (430 ft)

Population (2005 census)
  - Total: 2,120
  - Density: 3.28/km^{2} (8.50/sq mi)
- Time zone: UTC-5 (PET)
- UBIGEO: 160602

Inahuaya District is one of six districts of the province Ucayali in Peru.
