= El Chompipe Hill Protected Zone =

Protected area in Costa Rica

- Zona Protectora Cerro El Chompipe
- Location within Costa Rica
- Location: Costa Rica
- Coordinates: 9.933°N 84.482°W
- Area: 0.89 square kilometres (0.34 sq mi)
- Established: 3 November 1999
- Governing body: National System of Conservation Areas (SINAC)

El Chompipe Hill Protected Zone (Spanish: Zona Protectora Cerro El Chompipe), is a protected area in Costa Rica, managed under the Central Pacific Conservation Area, it was created in 1999 by decree 28196-MINAE.
