= Dismidila obscura =

Scientific classification
- Kingdom: Animalia
- Phylum: Arthropoda
- Class: Insecta
- Order: Lepidoptera
- Family: Crambidae
- Genus: Dismidila
- Species: D. obscura

Binomial name
- Dismidila obscura Munroe, 1970

Species of moth

Dismidila obscura is a moth in the family Crambidae. It was described by Eugene G. Munroe in 1970. It is found in Brazil.
