= Playa Blanca Marine Wetland =

Protected area in Costa Rica

- Humedal Marino Playa Blanca
- Location within Costa Rica
- Location: Costa Rica
- Coordinates: 9.698°N 84.673°W
- Area: 0.04 square kilometres (0.015 sq mi) (terrestrial), 0.07 square kilometres (0.027 sq mi) (marine)
- Established: 26 April 1994
- Governing body: National System of Conservation Areas (SINAC)

Playa Blanca Marine Wetland (Blanca Beach Marine Wetland, Spanish: Humedal Marino Playa Blanca), is a protected area in Costa Rica, managed under the Central Pacific Conservation Area, it was created in 1994 by decree 23127-MIRENEM.
