= Sarayacu District =

Coordinates: 6.3659°S 75.8272°W

Sarayacu Sarayaku
- District
- Location of Sarayacu in the Ucayali Province
- Country: Peru
- Region: Loreto
- Province: Ucayali
- Founded: January 2, 1857
- Capital: Dos de Mayo

Area
  - Total: 6,303.17 km^{2} (2,433.67 sq mi)
- Elevation: 125 m (410 ft)

Population (2005 census)
  - Total: 14,712
  - Density: 2.3341/km^{2} (6.0452/sq mi)
- Time zone: UTC-5 (PET)
- UBIGEO: 160605

Sarayacu District is one of six districts of the Ucayali Province in Peru.

== Climate ==
Climate data for Juancito, Sarayacu, elevation 124 m (407 ft), (1991–2020)
Month	Jan	Feb	Mar	Apr	May	Jun	Jul	Aug	Sep	Oct	Nov	Dec	Year
Mean daily maximum °C (°F)	32.0 (89.6)	31.2 (88.2)	31.2 (88.2)	31.4 (88.5)	31.3 (88.3)	31.2 (88.2)	31.5 (88.7)	32.1 (89.8)	32.1 (89.8)	32.2 (90.0)	31.7 (89.1)	31.4 (88.5)	31.6 (88.9)
Mean daily minimum °C (°F)	21.7 (71.1)	21.6 (70.9)	21.9 (71.4)	22.0 (71.6)	21.5 (70.7)	21.1 (70.0)	21.1 (70.0)	21.3 (70.3)	21.4 (70.5)	21.7 (71.1)	21.7 (71.1)	21.8 (71.2)	21.6 (70.8)
Average precipitation mm (inches)	118.7 (4.67)	125.2 (4.93)	151.8 (5.98)	142.9 (5.63)	95.8 (3.77)	76.2 (3.00)	79.3 (3.12)	68.9 (2.71)	72.4 (2.85)	71.6 (2.82)	121.7 (4.79)	150.1 (5.91)	1,274.6 (50.18)
Source: National Meteorology and Hydrology Service of Peru
