= Peñas Blancas Wildlife Refuge =

Protected area in Costa Rica

- Refugio de Vida Silvestre Peñas Blancas
- IUCN category IV (habitat/species management area)
- Location within Costa Rica
- Location: Costa Rica
- Coordinates: 10.132°N 84.669°W
- Area: 24.00 square kilometres (9.27 sq mi)
- Established: 13 December 1985
- Governing body: National System of Conservation Areas (SINAC)

Peñas Blancas Wildlife Refuge (Spanish: Refugio de Vida Silvestre Peñas Blancas), is a protected area in Costa Rica, managed under the Central Pacific Conservation Area, it was created in 1985 by law 7018, Art 28.
