= Dismidila drepanoides =

Scientific classification
- Kingdom: Animalia
- Phylum: Arthropoda
- Class: Insecta
- Order: Lepidoptera
- Family: Crambidae
- Genus: Dismidila
- Species: D. drepanoides

Binomial name
- Dismidila drepanoides Munroe, 1970

Species of moth

Dismidila drepanoides is a moth in the family Crambidae. It was described by Eugene G. Munroe in 1970. It is found in Peru.
