= Montes de Oro Protected Zone =

Protected area in Costa Rica

- Zona Protectora Montes de Oro
- IUCN category VI (protected area with sustainable use of natural resources)
- Location within Costa Rica
- Location: Costa Rica
- Coordinates: 10.132°N 84.678°W
- Area: 11.37 square kilometres (4.39 sq mi)
- Established: 27 April 1994
- Governing body: National System of Conservation Areas (SINAC)

Montes de Oro Protected Zone (Spanish: Zona Protectora Montes de Oro), is a protected area in Costa Rica, managed under the Central Pacific Conservation Area, it was created in 1994 by decree 23142-MIRENEM.
