= Dismidila =

Scientific classification
- Kingdom: Animalia
- Phylum: Arthropoda
- Class: Insecta
- Order: Lepidoptera
- Family: Crambidae
- Subfamily: Midilinae
- Genus: Dismidila; Dyar, 1914

Genus of moths

Dismidila is a genus of moths of the family Crambidae.

== Species ==
- Dismidila abrotalis (Walker, 1859)
- Dismidila atoca Dyar, 1914
- Dismidila drepanoides Munroe, 1970
- Dismidila gnoma Munroe, 1970
- Dismidila halia (Druce, 1900)
- Dismidila hermosa Munroe, 1970
- Dismidila obscura Munroe, 1970
- Dismidila pallida Munroe, 1970
- Dismidila regularis Munroe, 1970
- Dismidila similis Munroe, 1970
- Dismidila tocista Dyar, 1918
- Dismidila vivashae Schaus, 1933
