= Puntarenas Estuary and Associated Mangrove Swamps Wetland =

Protected area in Costa Rica

- Humedal Estero Puntarenas y Manglares Asociados
- Location within Costa Rica
- Location: Costa Rica
- Coordinates: 10.025°N 84.847°W
- Area: 52.41 square kilometres (20.24 sq mi)
- Established: 7 September 2006
- Governing body: National System of Conservation Areas (SINAC)

Puntarenas Estuary and Associated Mangrove Swamps Wetland (Spanish: Humedal Estero Puntarenas y Manglares Asociados), is a protected area in Costa Rica, managed under the Central Pacific Conservation Area, it was created in 2006 by decree 33327-MINAE.
