= La Ensenada Mixed Wildlife Refuge =

Protected area in Costa Rica

- Refugio de Vida Silvestre Mixto La Ensenada
- IUCN category IV (habitat/species management area)
- Location within Costa Rica
- Location: Costa Rica
- Coordinates: 10.145°N 85.043°W
- Area: 4.84 square kilometres (1.87 sq mi)
- Established: 18 August 1998
- Governing body: National System of Conservation Areas (SINAC)

La Ensenada Mixed Wildlife Refuge (Spanish: Refugio de Vida Silvestre Mixto La Ensenada), is a protected area in Costa Rica, managed under the Central Pacific Conservation Area, it was created in 1998 by decree 27211-MINAE.
