= La Cangreja National Park =

National park in Costa Rica

- IUCN category II (national park)
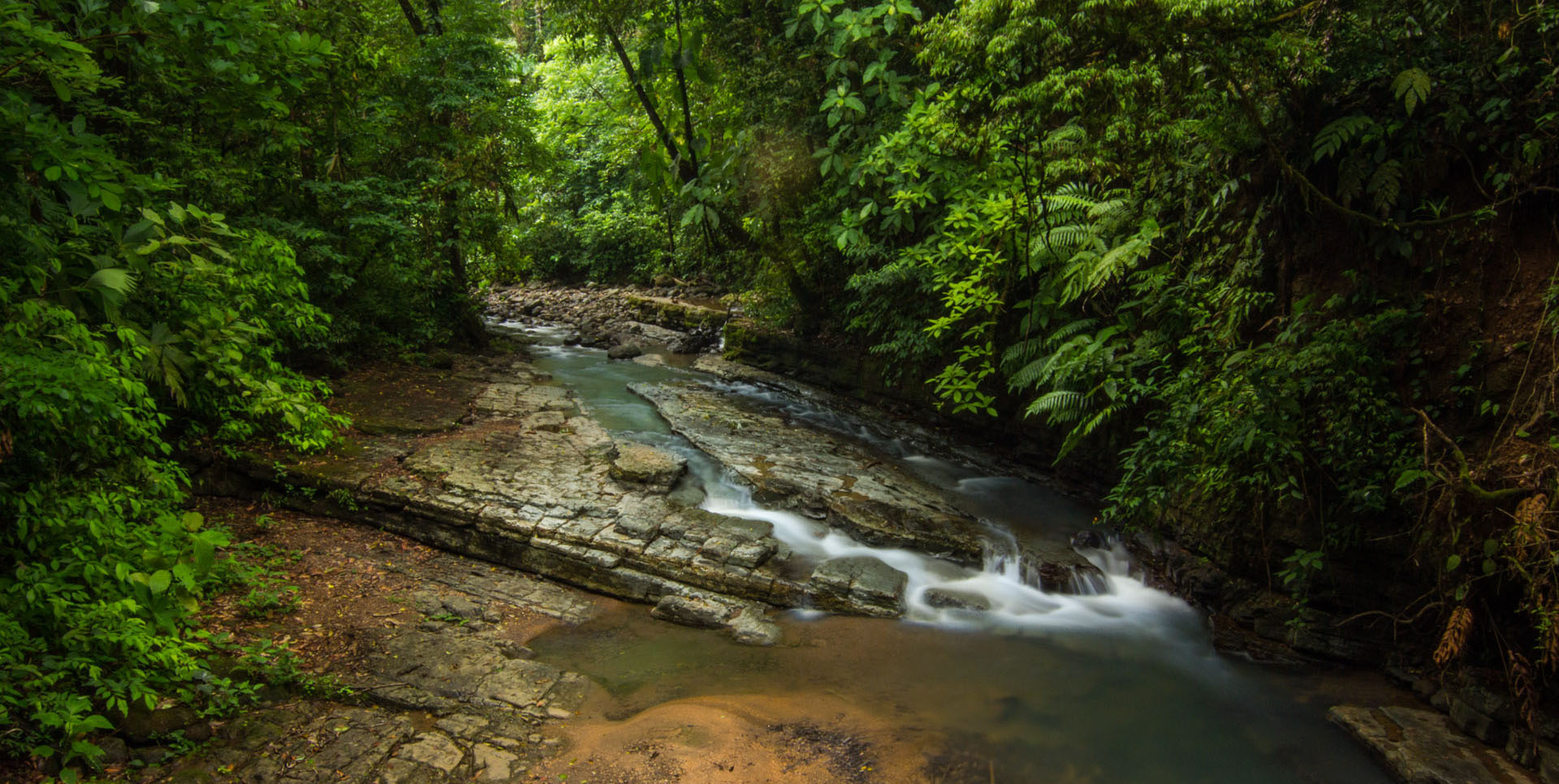
- Creek in La Cangreja National Park
- La Cangreja National Park area.
- Location: San José Province, Costa Rica
- Coordinates: 9°43′01″N 84°22′23″W
- Area: 4,600 acres (19 km^{2})
- Established: 1987
- Governing body: National System of Conservation Areas (SINAC)
- Website: Parque Nacional La Cangreja
- Location in Costa Rica

La Cangreja National Park, until 2002 the Cerro de la Cangreja Protected Zone, is a National Park in the Puriscal Canton of San José Province, in west-central Costa Rica.

It is a part of the Central Pacific Conservation Area, near the Pacific Ocean coast.

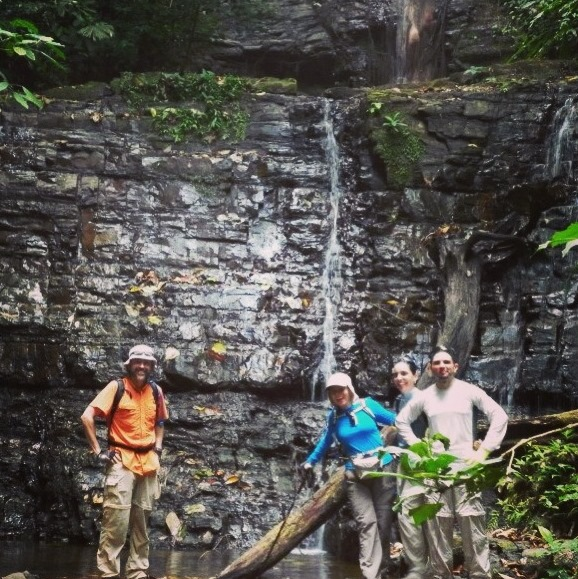
Waterfall in La Cangreja National Park.

== Flora and fauna ==
The park's forest includes tree species locally known as nazareno, cristóbal, olla de mono and cortez amarillo, as well as Guanacaste and ceiba. More than 300 species of birds have been recorded in the park, including scarlet macaws, trogons, toucans and the sunbittern. Mammals present include agoutis, coatis and collared peccaries, alongside green-and-black poison dart frogs and ctenosaurs.

== See also ==
- National parks of Costa Rica
- San José Province
