= Dismidila tocista =

Scientific classification
- Kingdom: Animalia
- Phylum: Arthropoda
- Class: Insecta
- Order: Lepidoptera
- Family: Crambidae
- Genus: Dismidila
- Species: D. tocista

Binomial name
- Dismidila tocista Dyar, 1918

Species of moth

Dismidila tocista is a moth in the family Crambidae. It was described by Harrison Gray Dyar Jr. in 1918. It is found in Veracruz, Mexico.
