= Pájaros Island Biological Reserve =

Protected area in Costa Rica

- Reserva Biológica Isla Pájaros
- IUCN category Ia (strict nature reserve)
- Location within Costa Rica
- Location: Costa Rica
- Coordinates: 10.094°N 84.997°W
- Area: 0.03 square kilometres (0.012 sq mi)
- Established: 15 May 1976
- Governing body: National System of Conservation Areas (SINAC)

Pájaros Island Biological Reserve (Spanish: Reserva Biológica Isla Pájaros), is a protected area in Costa Rica, managed under the Central Pacific Conservation Area, it was created in 1976 by decree 5963-A.

Pájaros Island lies 500 meters off the coast of the gulf basin, and has a very hot and dry climate. The plant species that grow on the islet are deciduous and semi-deciduous, such as the wild guava and fig trees.
