= Hermosa Beach Pride =

LGBTQ event in Hermosa Beach, California

- Genre: Pride parade and festival
- Date: A weekend in June
- Location: Hermosa Beach, California
- Inaugurated: 2021
- Organizer: Hermosa Beach Pride
- Website: hbpride.org

Hermosa Beach Pride is an annual pride parade and festival in Hermosa Beach, California. The event began in 2021, partially inspired by the burning of a rainbow-painted pride lifeguard tower in Long Beach, California.

== History ==
In March 2021, a rainbow-painted pride lifeguard tower was burned down in Long Beach in a case of suspected arson. This incident inspired local teen Izzy Bacallao and family to have a local lifeguard tower painted in solidarity; on June 14, 2021, the 13th Street lifeguard tower in Hermosa Beach was painted rainbow.

The first Hermosa Beach Pride event was held on Saturday, June 26, 2021. It featured a small parade of dozens of people who walked from Bottle Inn to the newly-painted rainbow pride lifeguard tower for a ribbon cutting ceremony.

By 2022, a nonprofit was formed to handle organizing the parade and festival, with Randy Renner, Jessica Accamando, and Jose Bacallou (Izzy Bacallao's father) as directors. When the event returned in June 2022, it was expanded to three days from June 24 to 26.

During the third annual Hermosa Beach Pride celebration, on June 17, 2023, a man threw a lit firework into the crowd in a suspected hate crime; multiple people suffered minor injuries. The suspect was identified as a juvenile, and the police determined that it was not a hate crime.

== List of annual events ==
Annual	Date	Ref
1st	June 26, 2021	
2nd	June 24 - June 26, 2022	
3rd	June 16 - June 17, 2023	
4th	June 14 - June 16, 2024	
5th	June 13 - June 15, 2025	
6th	June 12 - June 14, 2026	
