= Contamana District =

Coordinates: 7.3447°S 75.0131°W

Contamana
- District
- Location of Contamana in the Ucayali province
- Country: Peru
- Region: Loreto
- Province: Ucayali
- Founded: October 13, 1900
- Capital: Contamana

Government
  - Mayor: Luis Octavio Zuta Rengifo

Area
  - Total: 10,675.1 km^{2} (4,121.7 sq mi)
- Elevation: 134 m (440 ft)

Population (2007 census)
  - Total: 23,184
  - Density: 2.1718/km^{2} (5.6249/sq mi)
- Time zone: UTC-5 (PET)
- UBIGEO: 160601

Contamana District is one of six districts of the province Ucayali in Peru.

== Climate ==
Climate data for Contamana, elevation 157 m (515 ft), (1991–2020)
Month	Jan	Feb	Mar	Apr	May	Jun	Jul	Aug	Sep	Oct	Nov	Dec	Year
Mean daily maximum °C (°F)	32.5 (90.5)	31.9 (89.4)	31.3 (88.3)	31.3 (88.3)	30.8 (87.4)	30.4 (86.7)	30.8 (87.4)	32.3 (90.1)	32.9 (91.2)	33.1 (91.6)	33.0 (91.4)	32.8 (91.0)	31.9 (89.4)
Mean daily minimum °C (°F)	20.2 (68.4)	20.0 (68.0)	20.0 (68.0)	19.7 (67.5)	19.3 (66.7)	19.0 (66.2)	18.6 (65.5)	19.0 (66.2)	19.6 (67.3)	20.1 (68.2)	20.3 (68.5)	20.4 (68.7)	19.7 (67.4)
Average precipitation mm (inches)	147.2 (5.80)	173.3 (6.82)	207.7 (8.18)	177.8 (7.00)	147.7 (5.81)	79.8 (3.14)	69.9 (2.75)	73.2 (2.88)	109.5 (4.31)	145.2 (5.72)	158.1 (6.22)	126.9 (5.00)	1,616.3 (63.63)
Source: National Meteorology and Hydrology Service of Peru
