= Vargas Guerra District =

Coordinates: 6.9117°S 75.1576°W

Vargas Guerra
- District
- Location of Vargas Guerra in the Ucayali Province
- Country: Peru
- Region: Loreto
- Province: Ucayali
- Founded: June 8, 1936
- Capital: Orellana

Government
  - Mayor: Armando Davila Marina

Area
  - Total: 1,846.49 km^{2} (712.93 sq mi)
- Elevation: 130 m (430 ft)

Population (2005 census)
  - Total: 8,431
  - Density: 4.566/km^{2} (11.83/sq mi)
- Time zone: UTC-5 (PET)
- UBIGEO: 160606

Vargas Guerra District is one of six districts of the province Ucayali in Peru.
