= Central Pacific Conservation Area =

Conservation area in Costa Rica

- Área de Conservación Pacífico Central
- Location of the area, labeled ACOPAC in the west of the country.
- Location: Puntarenas Province, Costa Rica
- Coordinates: 9.542794°N 84.560992°W
- Governing body: National System of Conservation Areas (SINAC)

Central Pacific Conservation Area is an administrative area which is managed by SINAC for the purposes of conservation in the southwestern part of Costa Rica, on the Pacific coast. It contains four National Parks, and a number of Wildlife refuges and other types of nature reserve.

== Protected areas ==
- Carara National Park
- El Chompipe Hill Protected Zone
- Finca Barú del Pacífico Mixed Wildlife Refuge
- Hacienda La Avellana Mixed Wildlife Refuge
- La Cangreja National Park
- La Ensenada Mixed Wildlife Refuge
- Manuel Antonio National Park
- Montes de Oro Protected Zone
- Pájaros Island Biological Reserve
- Peñas Blancas Wildlife Refuge
- Playa Blanca Marine Wetland
- Playa Hermosa-Punta Mala Wildlife Refuge
- Portalón Mixed Wildlife Refuge
- Puntarenas Estuary and Associated Mangrove Swamps Wetland
- Redondo Hill Private Wildlife Refuge
- San Lucas Island National Park
- Tivives Protected Zone
- Transilvania Private Wildlife Refuge
