= Pampa Hermosa District =

Pampa Hermosa District may refer to:

- Pampa Hermosa District, Satipo in Peru
- Pampa Hermosa District, Ucayali in Peru
