= Dismidila abrotalis =

Scientific classification
- Kingdom: Animalia
- Phylum: Arthropoda
- Class: Insecta
- Order: Lepidoptera
- Family: Crambidae
- Genus: Dismidila
- Species: D. abrotalis

Binomial name
- Dismidila abrotalis (Walker, 1859)

Synonyms
- Cymoriza abrotalis Walker, 1859

Species of moth

Dismidila abrotalis is a moth in the family Crambidae. It was described by Francis Walker in 1859. It is found in Rio de Janeiro, Brazil.
