= Transilvania Private Wildlife Refuge =

Protected area in Costa Rica

- Refugio de Vida Silvestre Privado Transilvania
- Location within Costa Rica
- Location: Costa Rica
- Coordinates: 9.340°N 83.937°W
- Area: 0.63 square kilometres (0.24 sq mi)
- Established: 22 May 1998
- Governing body: National System of Conservation Areas (SINAC)

Transilvania Private Wildlife Refuge (Spanish: Refugio de Vida Silvestre Privado Transilvania), is a protected area in Costa Rica, managed under the Central Pacific Conservation Area, it was created in 1998 by decree 26972-MIRENEM.
