= Finca Barú del Pacífico Mixed Wildlife Refuge =

Protected area in Costa Rica

- Refugio de Vida Silvestre Mixto Finca Barú del Pacífico
- IUCN category IV (habitat/species management area)
- Location within Costa Rica
- Location: Costa Rica
- Coordinates: 9.267°N 83.876°W
- Area: 3.27 square kilometres (1.26 sq mi)
- Established: 6 October 1995
- Governing body: National System of Conservation Areas (SINAC)

Finca Barú del Pacífico Mixed Wildlife Refuge (Spanish: Refugio de Vida Silvestre Mixto Finca Barú del Pacífico), is a protected area in Costa Rica, managed under the Central Pacific Conservation Area, it was created in 1995 by decree 24639-MIRENEM.
