= Hermosa Beach oil drilling controversy =

The City of Hermosa Beach, located on the coast in Los Angeles County, California, called for a special election regarding oil drilling which took place on 3 March 2015. All of the materials prepared for the election on behalf of the City of Hermosa Beach were available on the city's website.

The ballot measure, titled Measure O, presents to the electorate for its consideration an ordinance that proposes various legislative changes that would lift the ban on oil drilling within the City, to allow an oil drilling and production project proposed by E&B Natural Resources Management Corp. to go forward at the site of the City Maintenance Yard at 555 Sixth Street, a development agreement, as well as an oil and gas pipeline franchise.

The question appeared on the ballot to which voters chose a “yes” or “no” answer to the following: "Shall E&B Corporation’s 34 well oil and gas drilling/production project at the City’s 555 Sixth Street maintenance yard be approved by 1) amending the General Plan and Municipal Code to exempt the project from the City’s oil drilling ban and repeal the restriction on City’s use of project royalties, 2) awarding a pipeline franchise to transport oil/gas underground, 3) approving a 34 year development agreement, and 4) determining that project financial benefits outweigh its unavoidable environmental impacts?"

In preparation for the election, the City of Hermosa Beach prepared an Environmental Impact Report (EIR) in compliance with the Environmental Quality Act, as well as a Cost Benefit Analysis (CBA) and Health Impact Assessment (HIA), and provided an extensive community education and review process.

E&B Natural Resources, the company behind the proposed Oil Drilling and Production Project, looks to access oil fields located offshore from a single onshore location using directional drilling technology. The proposed project is the result of a recently resolved legal battle between the city and the Macpherson Energy Corporation, in which Macpherson sued the city for damages over a previous plan that the city backed out of. The plan has been met with controversy, as residents are divided over the promise of an economic windfall versus potential health and environmental impacts on the community.

== Background: History of the Proposed Oil Drilling Project ==
A complete summary of important dates surrounding cases regarding Oil Drilling in Hermosa Beach can be accessed through the following link located on the City of Hermosa Beach website: http://www.hermosabch.org/modules/showdocument.aspx?documentid=1660.

The current proposal from E&B Natural Resources to recover oil in Hermosa Beach is the result of a series of voter-approved initiatives and legal settlements stretching back to 1984. Following voter approval of two initiatives to allow for oil drilling at this site in 1984, the City Council approved an agreement and a 35-year lease with Macpherson Oil Company to recover oil from the huge oil reservoir underneath the City. In 1995, voters reversed their previous approval and Macpherson then sued the City for more than $700 million. To put that number into perspective, Hermosa Beach’s annual budget is about $30 million. After losing at trial and prior to the start of the damages trial, the City hired jury experts who conducted independent “Mock Trials” to determine the amount of damages a jury might award Macpherson. The mock jurors awarded Macpherson hundreds of millions of dollars. A copy of these mock jury decisions can be found online at the City of Hermosa Beach’s website.

A judgment of this size against Hermosa Beach would have bankrupted the City. Following the advice of the City Attorney, outside legal counsel and the jury experts, the City negotiated a settlement that included the payment of $30 million to Macpherson. At this point E&B stepped in and paid $12.5 million to Macpherson and received their rights to the project, plus E&B loaned the City their share of the settlement payment – $17.5 million.

The settlement called for E&B to submit an application to the City that would include an exhaustive Environmental Impact Report as well as other financial and community studies. Following their review, the City will submit to the voters a new proposal to allow the safe recovery of oil from the same site. You can review the City’s overview of the project’s history on the “Proposed Oil Production Project” section of the City’s website. If the voters reject the proposal, the City will be required to repay the $17.5 million loan (plus interest) it received from E&B to pay its share of the settlement. If the proposed oil recovery project is approved, E&B will forgive $14 million and allow the balance to be paid from the City’s royalties from the oil produced.

== Background: Macpherson Energy vs City Of Hermosa ==
In 1992, Hermosa Beach granted an operating lease to the Macpherson Energy Company allowing them to use directional drilling to tap into underwater oil reserves off-shore from a single site located in the cities maintenance yard. As the company was preparing for the project, the City voted in 1995 to approve Proposition E, which restored a previously held ban on drilling. Since the agreement was in place before the vote, Hermosa moved ahead with the project. In 1998, following a report by the California Coastal Commission that raised safety concerns regarding the project, City Council voted to halt the project. Citing damages in lost revenue, Macpherson sued the city.

After 14 years of litigation, on March 2, 2012, the Hermosa Beach City Council entered into a settlement agreement to end the lawsuit.

Pursuant to the settlement agreement, E & B Natural Resources Management Corp. paid Macpherson Oil Co. $30 million for those rights, including Macpherson Oil Co.’s existing Conditional Use Permit and an oil and gas lease. E & B Natural Resources Management Corp. also would secure payment from the city of up to $17.5 million based on the results of a future election.

At that election, which is scheduled for March 3, 2015, Hermosa Beach voters will review a ballot measure, titled Measure O, and decide whether to repeal the existing ban on oil drilling in the city limits and enter into a development agreement for E & B Natural Resources Management Corp. to complete what it describes as a “state-of-the-art” oil drilling project at the city’s maintenance yard.

If the project is turned down by the voters, Hermosa would have to pay E&B Natural Resources the full amount of the loan.

== Project scope ==
E&B Natural Resources has proposed a 30-35 year project that involves four phases:

- Phase 1: Site Preparation. Phase 1 looks to construct revamp the project site by constructing new buildings to house equipment
- Phase 2: Oil Drilling & Testing. Phase 2 looks to conduct tests on the wells to provide an accurate picture of the potential productivity and economic viability of the project
- Phase 3: Final Design & Construction. Phase 3 utilizes the information collected in Phase 2 to create a final drilling program, acquire necessary equipment, and construct production facilities.
- Phase 4: Development Drilling & Operation. Phase 4 involves the bulk of oil recovery from the reservoir. In addition, sound attenuation walls will be constructed to reduce noise.

Since E&B Natural Resources will be using directional drilling for this project, traditional offshore drilling platforms will not be necessary for recovery. The process of Hydraulic Fracturing, or “fracking”, will also not be used, as the oil field provides naturally occurring characteristics that make the fracking unnecessary. Berkeley Research Group Director William Hamm completed a study that estimated that the City of Hermosa would receive $519 million of total economic benefit from the project, a figure that was quickly criticized by opponents of the project as speculative and unreliable since it is based on a study paid for by E&B.

== Public response ==
The residents of Hermosa Beach are very strongly divided on the merits of reversing its ban on oil drilling within the city limits. In the past year, the City of Hermosa Beach has held several public meetings on the project's EIR, as well as upon the health and economic impacts of the project. Advocates against oil drilling have rallied loudly against overturning the city's ban since early last year, citing the inescapable health and environmental concerns attached to such a project. A local advocacy group, Keep Hermosa Hermosa, has actively campaigned against undoing the city's current law banning oil drilling, and has become a significant political advocacy group in the city. E&B promises a windfall in profits to the community and contends that it is able to mitigate the health, environmental, and aesthetic concerns of the community, though the EIR released in April 2014 demonstrates that not all of the community's concerns can be completely mitigated. The estimated revenue to the city is projected to be approximately $500 million or more, according to the oil company. Some residents are concerned with the payback of the $17,500,000 loan to E&B if the project does not pass by the voters. It may be possible that it is for this reason that some residents are in favor of the project, though the city manager of the City of Hermosa Beach has also publicly stated that a vote "no" on this proposal will not bankrupt the city, as it has sizable cash reserves and an excellent credit rating.

The financial impact on the city is a consideration for many, as one recent quote from a former city councilman suggests. “I’m truly agnostic about what voters choose to do,” said former Mayor Kit Bobko, who helped negotiated the deal with the two companies. “My primary concern in this is extracting us from this litigation, which is potentially ruinous.”
