= Colegio Bilingüe Vista Hermosa =

Private school in Guatemala City

Coordinates: 14.4794°N 90.4857°W

Vista Hermosa Bilingual School Spanish: Colegio Bilingüe Vista Hermosa

Information
- Motto: Where Our Daily Effort Transcends
- Established: 1978; 47 years ago
- Language: Spanish and English
- Website: bvh.edu.gt

The Colegio Bilingüe Vista Hermosa ("Vista Hermosa Bilingual School") is a bilingual Spanish-English private school in km. 24.5, Carretera a El Salvador, Fraijanes, Departament of Guatemala. It serves pre-primary through secondary, including high school. The school was established in 1978.
