= Vista Hermosa =

Vista Hermosa means "beautiful view" in Spanish and may refer to:

- Vista Hermosa, Meta, a town and municipality in Colombia.
- C.D. Vista Hermosa, a football (soccer) club.
- Vista Hermosa, Michoacán, a municipality in Mexico with its seat at Vista Hermosa de Negrete.
- Vista Hermosa (Mexico City Metrobús), a BRT station in Mexico City.
