= Hermosa Beach Pier =

Pier in Southern California, United States

Coordinates: 33.8615°N 118.4038°W

The Hermosa Beach Pier is located in the Southern California city of Hermosa Beach. It extends into the Pacific Ocean.

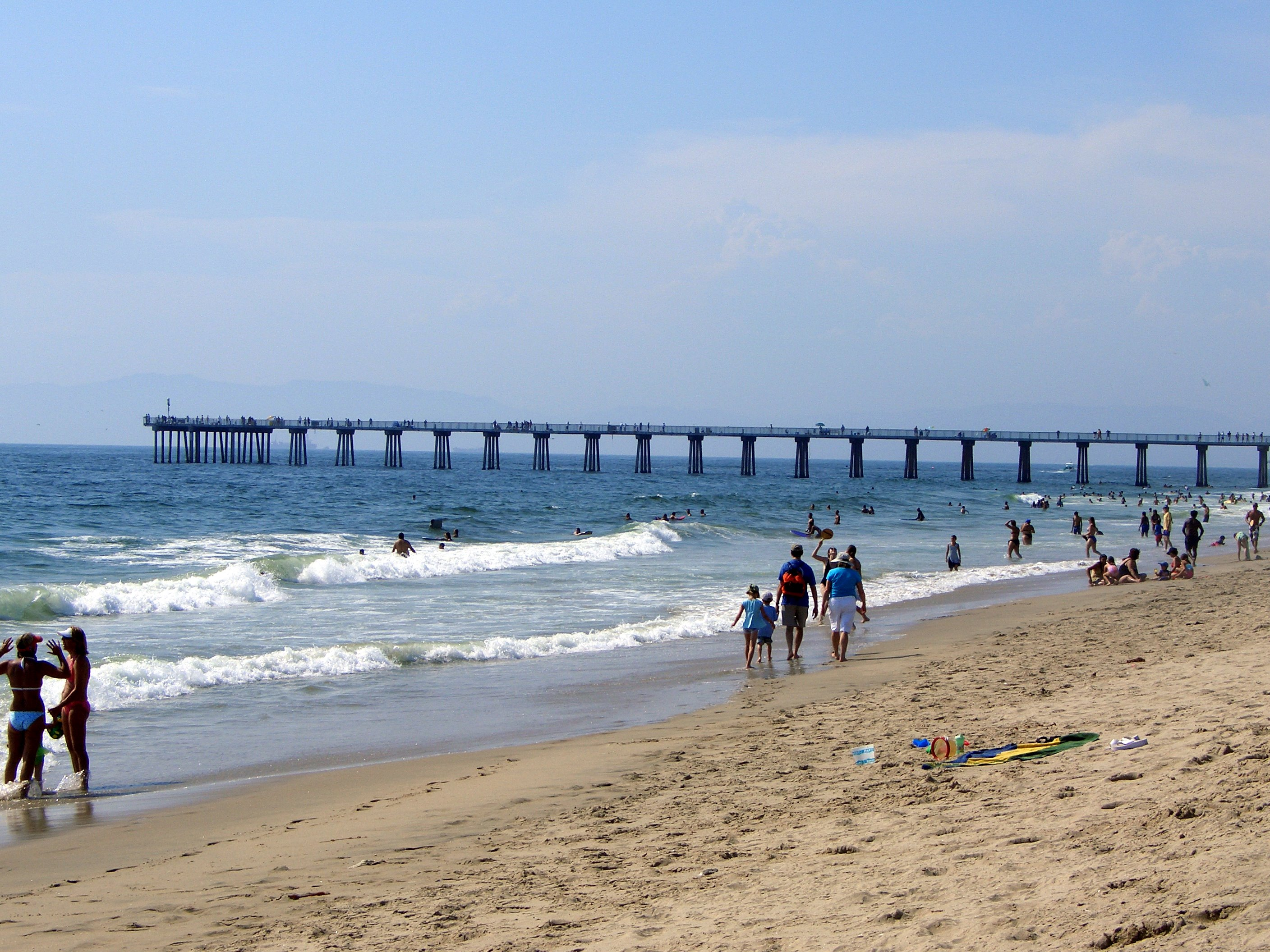
Hermosa Beach Pier in the summer of 2006

In 1904 the first pier was built. It was constructed entirely of wood even to the pilings and it extended five hundred feet out into the ocean. The pier was constructed by the Hermosa Beach Land and Water Company. In 1913 this old pier was partly washed away and later torn down and a new one built to replace it. This pier was built of concrete 1,000 feet (300 m) long, and paved with asphalt its entire length. Small tiled pavilions were erected at intervals along the sides to afford shade for fishing and picnic parties. A bait stand was built eventually out on the end. Soon after, about 1914, an auditorium building was constructed; it has housed various enterprises and at present the public rest rooms, the Los Angeles Lifeguard Service, and the local branch of the LA County Library occupy rooms in the building. This pier is municipally owned.

The pier's frontage has changed in appearance over the years and electric train lines used to run along the coastline.

== Filming location ==
Film

- Hardbodies (1984)
- La La Land (2016)

TV

- Scenes of the TV show The O.C. were filmed on the Hermosa Beach Strand, Pier and Plaza
- The Amazing Race 31

== See also ==
- Hermosa Beach
- Beach Cities
- South Bay
