= Anderson v. City of Hermosa Beach =

- Court: United States Court of Appeals for the Ninth Circuit
- Full case name: Johnny Anderson v. City of Hermosa Beach.
- Argued: May 7, 2010
- Decided: September 9, 2010

Case history
- Appealed from: The United States District Court for the Central District of California

Court membership
- Judges sitting: John T. Noonan, Richard R. Clifton, and Jay S. Bybee

Case opinions
- Decision by: Judge Jay S. Bybee
- Concurrence: Judge John T. Noonan

Laws applied
- Hermosa Beach Municipal Code § 17.06.070

Area of law
- First Amendment Free Speech

Anderson v. City of Hermosa Beach, 621 F. 3d 1051 (2010), was a decision by the U.S. Court of Appeals for the Ninth Circuit, which ruled that tattoos, the process of tattooing, and the business of tattooing are pure expressive activities that are fully protected by the First Amendment's free speech clause. The court determined that the process of tattooing constitutes pure expressive activity rather than conduct that is sufficiently imbued with elements of communication. As pure expressive activity, the process of tattooing can only be regulated by a proper time, place, and manner restriction. The court found in Anderson v. The City of Hermosa Beach that the Hermosa Beach Municipal Code banning tattoo parlors within the city was not a reasonable time, place, and manner restriction because the regulation was not narrowly tailored to meet the government's interest and the regulation did not leave open ample alternative avenues for the same messages to be conveyed.

== Background ==
=== Legal history of tattooing in the United States ===
A tattoo is a visual symbol engrafted onto a person's skin with needles and ink that depicts pictures and words. The Supreme Court of the United States has held that pictures and other forms of symbolic speech, unless otherwise indicated, are protected by the First Amendment of the United States Constitution. Pictures, such as paintings and photographs are considered pure expression regardless of the media by which the forms of expression are conveyed.

While messages being displayed on a person's skin may be protected by the First Amendment, the process of tattooing may lead to health and safety risks. If applied in unsanitary conditions, tattooing can result in the spread of communicable diseases such as hepatitis. The government has been able to regulate the activity of tattooing because the government has an interest in keeping the public safe and healthy.

Past cases involving tattooing and the First Amendment have used the Spence Test in order to determine whether or not the process of tattooing can be considered as having an expressive component. The Spence Test, described in Spence v. Washington states that conduct can be considered to be imbued with expressive elements of communication if the conduct is intended to communicate a message and the conduct is likely to be understood as being communicative by its intended audience. If the conduct is considered to be communicative, free speech protection may apply. However, the government has a freer hand in the regulation process. ii Regulations must follow the O'Brien Test. The O'Brien Test states that the government can regulate communicative conduct if it is within the government's constitutional right to do so, the regulation furthers an important governmental interest that is unrelated to the suppression of speech, and the regulation is narrowly tailored to prohibit no more speech than is essential to further that interest.

Expressive activity such as writing a book or giving a public speech is considered pure speech and is afforded the most protection under the First Amendment. A statute that regulates purely expressive activity is constitutional only if it is written as a valid time, place, and manner restriction.

Past court cases within the United States have addressed the issue of whether or not the process of tattooing is protected by the First Amendment. In 1980, in Yurkew v. Sinclair the court indicated that the process of tattooing was not sufficiently imbued with elements of communication. Therefore, the process of tattooing was not protected by the First Amendment. v Similarly, in the 2008 case of Hold Fast Tattoo, LLC v. City of North Chicago, the court found that the process of tattooing was not protected under the First Amendment. v While the court held that the tattoo itself may be considered as protected speech, the physical process of tattooing was distinct and one step removed from the finished product. Past tattoo cases show that courts within the United States have traditionally found the process of tattooing to fall outside the protection of the First Amendment.

=== Anderson's permit application ===
The County of Los Angeles generally permits tattooing within its jurisdiction. However, the city of Hermosa Beach, located within Los Angeles County, banned tattoo parlors within its city limits. The Hermosa Beach Municipal Code § 17.06.070 stated: "Except as provided in this title, no building shall be erected, re-constructed or structurally altered, nor shall any building or land be used for any purpose except as hereinafter specifically provided…" The Code accepted permit requests from several types of businesses including bars, restaurants, movie theaters, youth hostels, and shops. However, tattoo shops were not listed in the provision of the zoning code. As a result, tattoo shops were banned in Hermosa Beach.

In 2006, Johnny Anderson, co-owner of Yer Cheat'n Heart Tattoo in Gardena, sought to expand his business and open a new tattoo shop in Hermosa Beach. Anderson, aware of the municipal ban on tattoo shops within Hermosa Beach, sued the city. The action was initially dismissed because Anderson had not expended all resources for determining whether or not his tattoo shop would be allowed within the city. Following city administrative procedures, Anderson filed a request with the city requesting that his shop be exempt from the municipal ban. The city denied his special permit request in 2007. Anderson then filed a 42 USC § 1983 civil rights claim, alleging the Hermosa Beach Municipal Code violated his first and fourteenth amendment civil liberties.

=== Lower trial proceedings ===
Anderson's claim was originally heard by the United States District Court for the Central District of California. The decision of the district court remained consistent with past free speech tattoo jurisprudence. The court stated that although the process of tattooing is considered non-verbal conduct that can express certain ideas, such expression is not sufficiently imbued with elements of communication and therefore cannot receive First Amendment protection. The process of tattooing was not considered pure expressive activity or expressive conduct. Failing to reach either of these statuses, Judge Christina Snyder reviewed the zoning statute by applying the rational basis test. The court found that the municipal ban on tattoo parlors was valid because the regulation was rationally related to the city's interest of protecting the public from potential health risks associated with the tattooing process.

== Holding ==
On September 9, 2010, the United States Court of Appeals for the Ninth Circuit reversed the holding of the lower court. Judge Jay Bybee acted against precedent by holding that the tattoo, the process of tattooing, and the business of tattooing are purely expressive activities that are fully protected under the First Amendment. The court also held that the city's total ban on tattoo parlors is not a reasonable time, place, and manner restriction.

== Legal questions ==
The questions presented in Anderson v. City of Hermosa Beach are as follows:

1. Is tattooing purely expressive activity more akin to the writing process or merely conduct that is being used to express an idea such as the burning of a draft card?
2. . If tattooing is considered to be pure expression protected by the First Amendment, is the Hermosa Beach Municipal ban on tattoo parlors a reasonable time, place, and manner restriction?

== U.S. Court of Appeals for the Ninth Circuit majority opinion ==
=== Tattooing as purely expressive activity ===
The court claimed in Anderson v. City of Hermosa Beach that tattoos, tattooing, and the business of tattooing are considered pure speech. In creating a tattoo, the court held that both the tattoo artist and client are participating in expressive activity. Both parties collaborate and contribute to the artistic vision of the final product.

In Anderson v. City of Hermosa Beach, the Court states that the Supreme Court of the United States has consistently held that First Amendment protections encompass more expression than spoken and written words. Tattoos are composed of words, symbols, and images that are meant to convey a variety of messages to both the artist, the client, and the audience who may later view the tattoo. Therefore, the Court held that tattoos are entitled to full First Amendment protection.

The Court also held that the business of tattooing does not affect whether or not the process of tattooing is free expression. The sale of artwork does not remove the expressive content from being protected by the First Amendment. This protection does not become diminished as the artwork is sold. The Court noted that the sale of the tattoo is intertwined with the process of tattooing and the tattoo itself. The business of tattooing is therefore pure expressive activity that is entitled to full protection under the First Amendment.

The court found that tattooing is similar to writing or painting. Writing and painting are considered pure speech. Therefore, the process of tattooing should be considered pure speech rather than conduct that can contain expressive elements. With activities such as writing, painting, and tattooing, the court notes that the processes of creation are "inextricably intertwined" with the final products. Both the tattoo and the process of tattooing must be afforded First Amendment protection. The process of creation cannot be distinctly separated from the final product. The court notes that a tattoo cannot be created without the conduct of placing a needle beneath a client's skin just as the Declaration of Independence could not have been created without the process of placing a quill on paper. The court holds that the process of tattooing and the tattoo itself are so intertwined that the restriction of tattooing effectively restricts the ability to obtain a tattoo and display constitutionally protected expression.

The court states that the process of tattooing may place a client's safety at risk. However, a form of speech cannot lose First Amendment protection based on the surface on which the expression is applied. The court notes that the governmental interest in keeping the public safe may enable the city of Hermosa Beach to regulate the process of tattooing. However, a complete ban on the process of tattooing cannot be permitted.

=== Time, place, and manner restriction ===
A government can regulate pure speech if the regulation is a valid time, place, and manner regulation. In order to be a permissible time, place, and manner regulation, the regulation must be content neutral and serve an important governmental interest. The regulation must be narrowly tailored to achieve this governmental interest, and the government regulation must leave ample alternative channels of communication open to speakers. The Ninth Circuit Court held that the Municipal Code that banned tattoo parlors in Hermosa Beach was not a valid time, place and manner restriction.

The court found that the city's Municipal Code was content neutral. All tattoo parlors were banned in Hermosa Beach regardless of the content of the tattooed images. The court also determined that the city government has an interest in regulating the process of tattooing. The governmental interest of protecting the public health and safety is a significant governmental interest. The government can protect this interest through regulatory means as long as the regulation is narrowly tailored to achieve the goal of protecting the citizens of Hermosa Beach.

The City of Hermosa Beach argued that the process of tattooing can put a client's safety at risk because puncturing the skin with a needle can create infection. Therefore, the city must be able to regulate such activity in order to protect its citizens. California state law requires tattoo artists to register their businesses with country health departments. The city of Hermosa Beach argued in this case that Los Angeles County had limited resources to inspect and regulate tattoo parlors. As a result, the city claimed that a total ban on tattoo parlors was justified because it was the only way to ensure that citizens of Hermosa Beach would not be at risk of infection from unsanitary needles.

The U.S. Court of Appeals rejected the city's argument. The Hermosa Beach Municipal Code banning tattoo shops was not narrowly tailored to achieve the city's interest in protecting the health and safety of its citizens. The ordinance was too broad and banned speech that is traditionally protected under the First Amendment. The court determined that a total ban on tattooing would not only prohibit unsanitary and unsterile tattoo shops within the city, but would also prohibit tattoo shops that practiced tattooing in a safe manner. The city claimed anything less than a total ban on tattooing would leave the public unprotected. However, the court held that the city must give more proof to show that its interests could not be achieved with a more narrowly defined regulation. The court concluded that the city could not justify the total ban with its refusal to allocate the resources necessary to accommodate public health concerns while also protecting the speech of tattoo artists and clients. The city's interests could be achieved through regulatory means rather than a total ban on tattoo parlors. For example, a regulation that required tattoo artists to receive proper sterilization and sanitary training would allow the government to achieve its goal of protecting the public health while also enabling tattoo artists and clients to express themselves freely.

The court indicated that even if the regulation was narrowly tailored, it would still be unconstitutional. Ample alternatives for expressing the ideas conveyed in a tattoo are not available to speakers in Hermosa Beach. The court held that a tattoo is a unique form of communication that carries a distinct message. This message could not be equally or effectively conveyed through another medium such as a temporary tattoo or a canvas. The permanence and pain associated with a tattoo creates a unique message, indicating to a reader of the message that the speaker is highly committed to the message he or she is displaying. The Hermosa Beach Municipal Code forecloses an entire, unique medium of expression to tattoo artists and clients. Without providing speakers in Hermosa Beach with ample alternatives to convey the same message found in a tattoo, the Hermosa Beach Municipal Code is not a valid time, place, and manner restriction. The ban on tattoo parlors unconstitutionally restricts a speaker's freedom of expression.

== Judge Noonan's concurring opinion ==
Judge Noonan delivered a concurring opinion in Anderson v. City of Hermosa Beach. He states that the process of tattooing should not be considered as pure expression in all cases. Noonan gives the example that a tattoo that was "punitively affixed" would not be protected by the First Amendment. Therefore, context plays a significant role in determining whether or not the process of tattooing falls under First Amendment protection in a specific case.

Noonan also indicates that while the process of tattooing may qualify as protected speech, tattooing still requires regulation because the creation of a tattoo can involve dangerous risks to a client's health and safety.

== Subsequent developments ==
Until 2010, no federal court of appeals had decided a case that involved tattooing restrictions and free speech implications. The United States Supreme Court has not addressed the First Amendment issues raised by the process of tattooing and denied a writ of certiorari to a case that challenged South Carolina's restrictions on tattooing. Anderson v. City of Hermosa Beach is the first federal decision that has diverged from past court rulings. Past decisions indicated that the process of tattooing was conduct that had no expressive value. The ruling in Anderson would go on to subsequently influence a case that was brought before the Arizona Supreme Court. The Arizona Supreme Court, like the U.S. Court of Appeals for the Ninth Circuit, determined that the process of tattooing is a purely expressive activity that must receive robust First Amendment protections.

Coleman v. City of Mesa marked the first time a state Supreme Court ruled that tattoos and the process of tattooing were protected under the First Amendment. In 2008 a tattoo artist applied to open a tattooing business in a strip mall within the city of Mesa. The applicant was denied a permit, and sued the government on First Amendment grounds. While the plaintiff lost at trial, Ryan Coleman eventually made his way to the state Supreme Court. The Arizona Supreme Court agreed to hear Coleman's case, acknowledging that Coleman had a viable First Amendment claim. In the 2012 case of Coleman v. City of Mesa, the Arizona Supreme Court granted First Amendment protection to tattooing. The court cited Anderson when holding that obtaining a tattoo, applying a tattoo, and engaging in the business of tattooing are protected under the First Amendment. The court determined that these activities were considered pure speech that was to be afforded the highest level of protection by the First Amendment and Article 2, Section 6 of the Arizona Constitution.

== See also ==
History of tattooing

Cohen v. California

United States v. O'Brien

Ward v. Rock Against Racism
