= Playa Hermosa-Punta Mala Wildlife Refuge =

Protected area in Costa Rica

- Refugio de Vida Silvestre Playa Hermosa-Punta Mala
- Location within Costa Rica
- Location: Costa Rica
- Coordinates: 9.538°N 84.565°W
- Area: 3.71 square kilometres (1.43 sq mi) (terrestrial), 22.93 square kilometres (8.85 sq mi) (marine)
- Established: 3 June 1998
- Governing body: National System of Conservation Areas (SINAC)

Playa Hermosa-Punta Mala Wildlife Refuge (Hermosa Beach-Mala Point Wildlife Refuge, Spanish: Refugio de Vida Silvestre Playa Hermosa-Punta Mala), is a protected area in Costa Rica, managed under the Central Pacific Conservation Area, it was created in 1998 by decree 27210-MINAE.
