= Hermosa Beach City School District =

School district in California, United States

Address
- 425 Valley Drive Hermosa Beach, California, 90254; United States

District information
- Type: Public
- Grades: K–8
- NCES District ID: 0617040

Students and staff
- Students: 1,198 (2020–2021)
- Teachers: 56.5 (FTE)
- Staff: 35.78 (FTE)
- Student–teacher ratio: 21.2:1

Other information
- Website: www.hbcsd.org

The Hermosa Beach School District is responsible for public education in the city of Hermosa Beach, California. It has 3 schools Hermosa Valley (5-8) Hermosa View (Pre-k-1) Hermosa Vista (2-4)

The school district is supported by the Hermosa Beach Education Foundation, a volunteer-run program which raises financial support for continued educational development of the students and teachers of the School District.

Residents of the district were also in South Bay Union High School District until 1993, when it dissolved. Since 1993 residents may choose between Redondo Union High School or Mira Costa High School after graduating from Hermosa Beach CSD.

== Awards and recognition ==
In 2005, Hermosa Valley and Hermosa View schools received the U.S. Department of Education National Blue Ribbon School award for academic achievement along with approximately 300 schools in the United States, 33 of which were in California. Hermosa schools were among the top 10% of schools in the state, with students scoring at or above the 90% in the highest grade tested in reading and math. For the award, the Department of Education reviewed growth in scores over a three-year period.

The Hermosa Beach City School District as a whole received a score of 915 on the 2006 California Academic Performance Index, and neighboring Manhattan Beach Unified School District scored just below at 906, making it one of California's best performing districts. Each individual school also ranks at the top of its respective category.

== Schools ==
- Hermosa View School (TK-1)
- Hermosa Vista School (2-4)
- Hermosa Valley School (5-8)

== See also ==
- Non-high school district
