= Hermosa Beach, California =

City in California, United States

- City
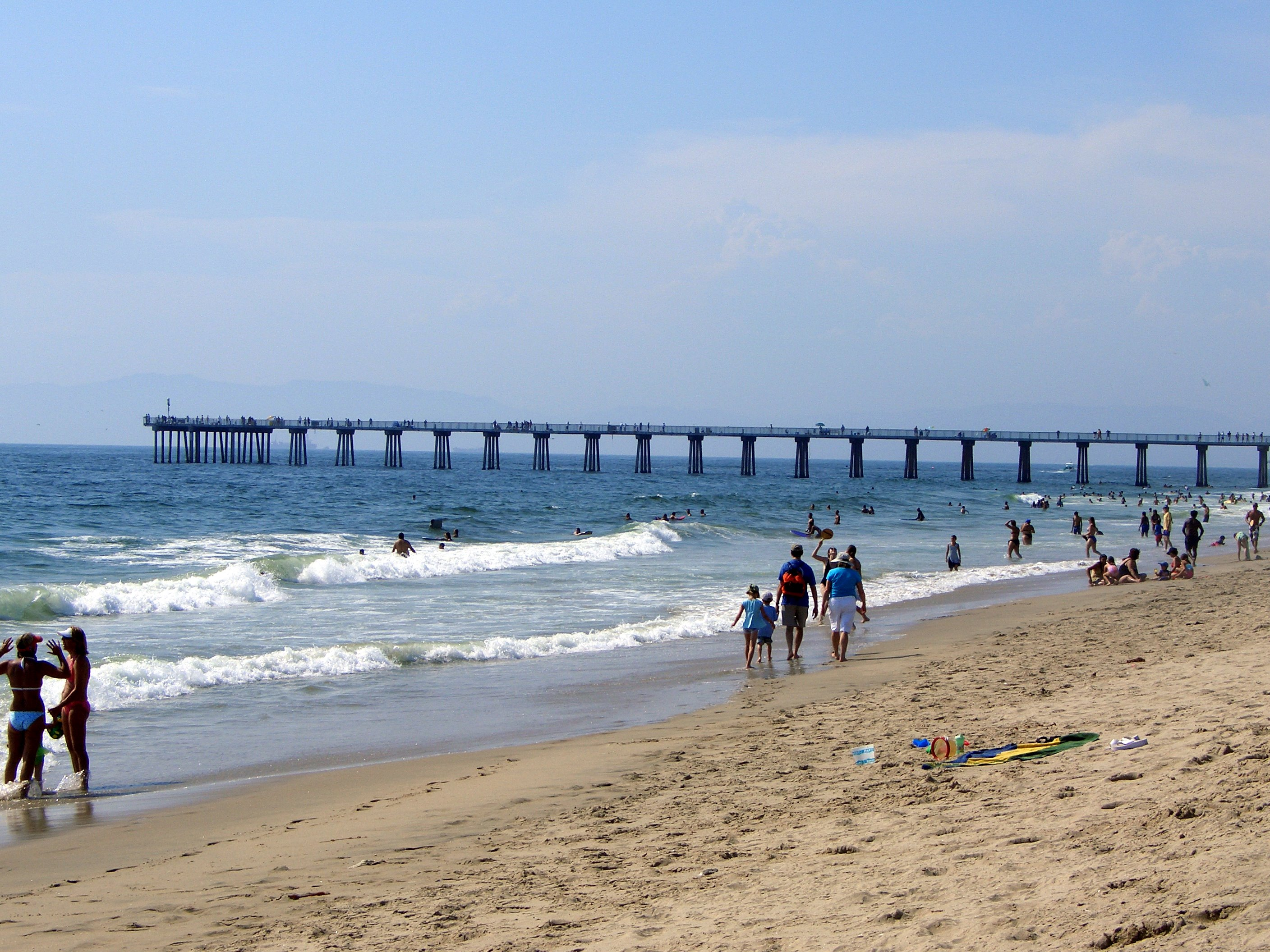
- The Hermosa Beach Pier on a summer day

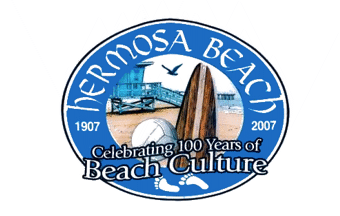
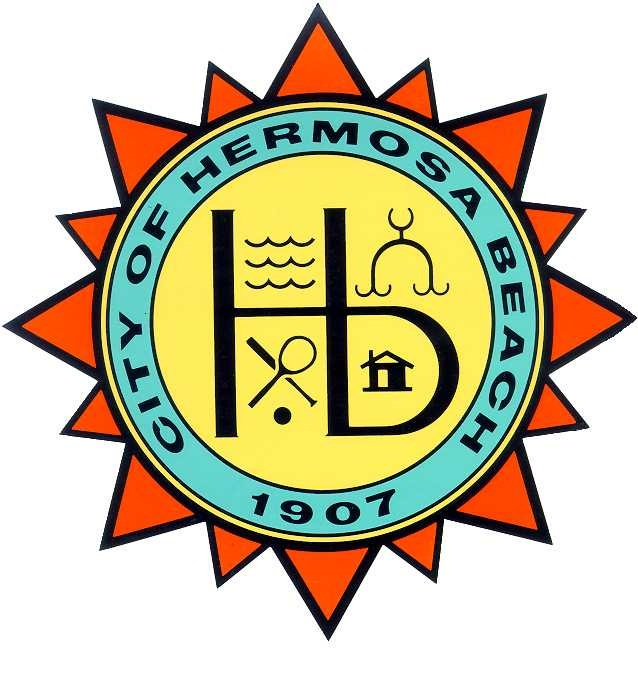
- Flag Seal
- Motto: "The Best Little Beach City"
- Interactive map of Hermosa Beach, California
- Location in the United States Hermosa Beach (California) Hermosa Beach (the Los Angeles metropolitan area)
- Coordinates: 33°51′59″N 118°23′59″W
- Country: United States
- State: California
- County: Los Angeles
- Incorporated (California General Law City): January 14, 1907
- Named for: Spanish for beautiful

Government
  - Type: Council-Manager
  - Mayor: Mike Detoy
  - Mayor pro tempore: Michael D. Keegan
  - Councilmembers: Rob Saemann; Raymond Jackson; Dean Francois
  - City treasurer: David Pedersen
  - City clerk (Non-elected, City employee): Martha Alvarez

Area
  - Total: 1.42 sq mi (3.69 km^{2})
  - Land: 1.42 sq mi (3.69 km^{2})
  - Water: 0 sq mi (0.00 km^{2}) 0%
- Elevation: 26 ft (8 m)

Population (2020)
  - Total: 19,728
  - Density: 13,800/sq mi (5,350/km^{2})
- Time zone: UTC-8 (PST)
  - Summer (DST): UTC-7 (PDT)
- ZIP Code: 90254
- Area codes: 310 and 424
- FIPS code: 06-33364
- GNIS feature IDs: 1652719, 2410749
- Website: hermosabeach.gov

Hermosa Beach (Hermosa, Spanish for "Beautiful") is a beachfront city in Los Angeles County, California, United States. Its population was 19,728 at the 2020 U.S. census. The city is located in the South Bay region of the Greater Los Angeles area; it is one of the three Beach Cities. Hermosa Beach is bordered by the other two, Manhattan Beach to the north and Redondo Beach to the south and east.

The city's beach is popular for sunbathing, beach volleyball, surfing, paddleboarding, bars, cycling and running. The city itself extends only about 15 blocks from east to west and 40 blocks from north to south, with Pacific Coast Highway running down the middle. Situated on the Pacific Ocean, Hermosa's average temperature is 70 °F (21 °C) in the summer and 55 °F (13 °C) in the winter. Westerly sea breezes lessen what can be high summertime temperatures in Los Angeles and elsewhere in the county and help keep the smog away 360 days of the year.

A paved path, called The Strand, runs along Hermosa's beach from Torrance Beach in the south approximately twenty miles north to Santa Monica. The Hermosa Beach Pier is at the end of Pier Avenue, which is one of the beach community's main shopping, dining and entertainment areas.

== History ==
Hermosa Beach was originally part of the 1784 Rancho San Pedro Spanish land grant that later became the ten-mile (16 km) ocean frontage of Rancho Sausal Redondo. In 1900, a tract of 1,500 acres (6.1 km^{2}) was purchased for $35 per acre from A. E. Pomroy, then owner of the greater part of Rancho Sausal Redondo. Messrs. Burbank and Baker, agents, bought this land for Sherman and Clark who organized and retained the controlling interest in the Hermosa Beach Land and Water Company.

In early days, Hermosa Beach — like so many of its neighboring cities (Inglewood, Lawndale, Torrance) — was one vast sweep of rolling hills covered with fields of grain, mostly barley. During certain seasons of the year large herds of sheep were grazed over this land, and corrals and large barns for storing the grain, as well as providing shelter for horses and farm implements, were located on the ranch between Hermosa and Inglewood. The Spanish words Rancho Sausal Redondo mean a large circular ranch of pasture of grazing land, with a grove of willow on it.

The first official survey was made in the year 1901 for the board walk on the Strand, Hermosa Avenue and Santa Fe Avenue; work on these projects commenced soon after. In 1904 the first pier was built. It was constructed entirely of wood even to the pilings and it extended five hundred feet out into the ocean. The pier was constructed by the Hermosa Beach Land and Water Company. In 1913 this old pier was partly washed away and later torn down and a new one built to replace it. This pier was built of concrete 1,000 feet (300 m) long, and paved with asphalt its entire length. Small tiled pavilions were erected at intervals along the sides to afford shade for fishermen and picnic parties. A bait stand was built eventually out on the end. Soon after, about 1914, an auditorium building was constructed; it has housed various enterprises and at present the public rest rooms, the Los Angeles Life Guard Service, and the local branch of the Los Angeles County Public Library occupy rooms in the building. This pier is municipally owned.

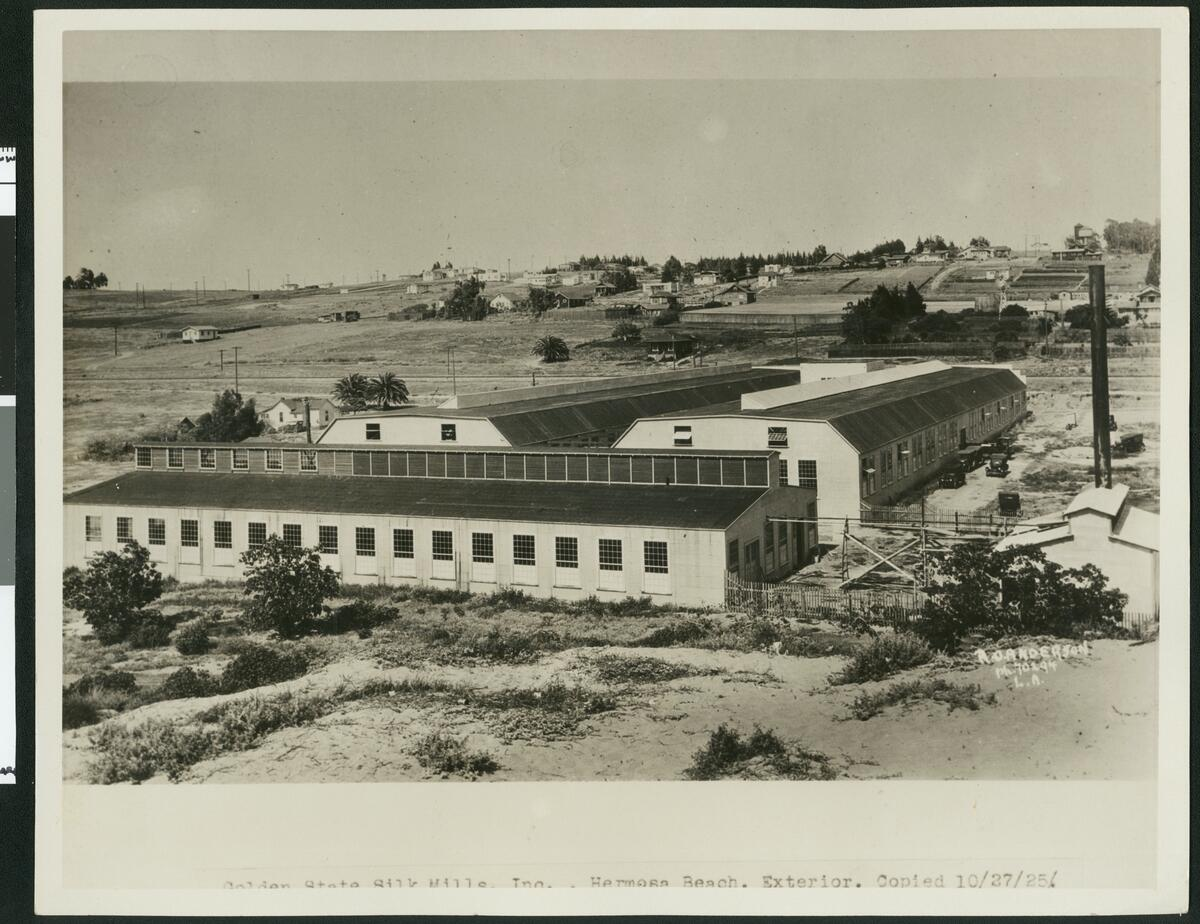
Golden State Silk Mills in Hermosa Beach, c. 1925; the small city was the center of the West Coast silk industry

The Los Angeles Pacific Railway, a trolley system, was the first trolley service in Hermosa Beach, running the entire length of Hermosa Ave. on its way from L.A. to Redondo Beach. A few years later it was merged with most other trolley companies in the region to form the new Pacific Electric Railway Company, informally called the Red Cars.

The Santa Fe Railway was the first railroad to run through Hermosa Beach. It was seven blocks from the beach. The street that led to the tracks was called Santa Fe Avenue, but was later renamed Pier Avenue. There was no Santa Fe railway station for Hermosa, but Burbank and Baker built a railway platform on the west side of the tracks near Santa Fe Avenue, and later the railroad company donated an old boxcar to be used as a storage place for freight. In 1926, the Santa Fe built a modern stucco depot and installed Western Union telegraph service in it.

The first city election for city officers was held December 24, 1906. On January 14, 1907, Hermosa Beach became the nineteenth incorporated city of Los Angeles County.

== Geography ==
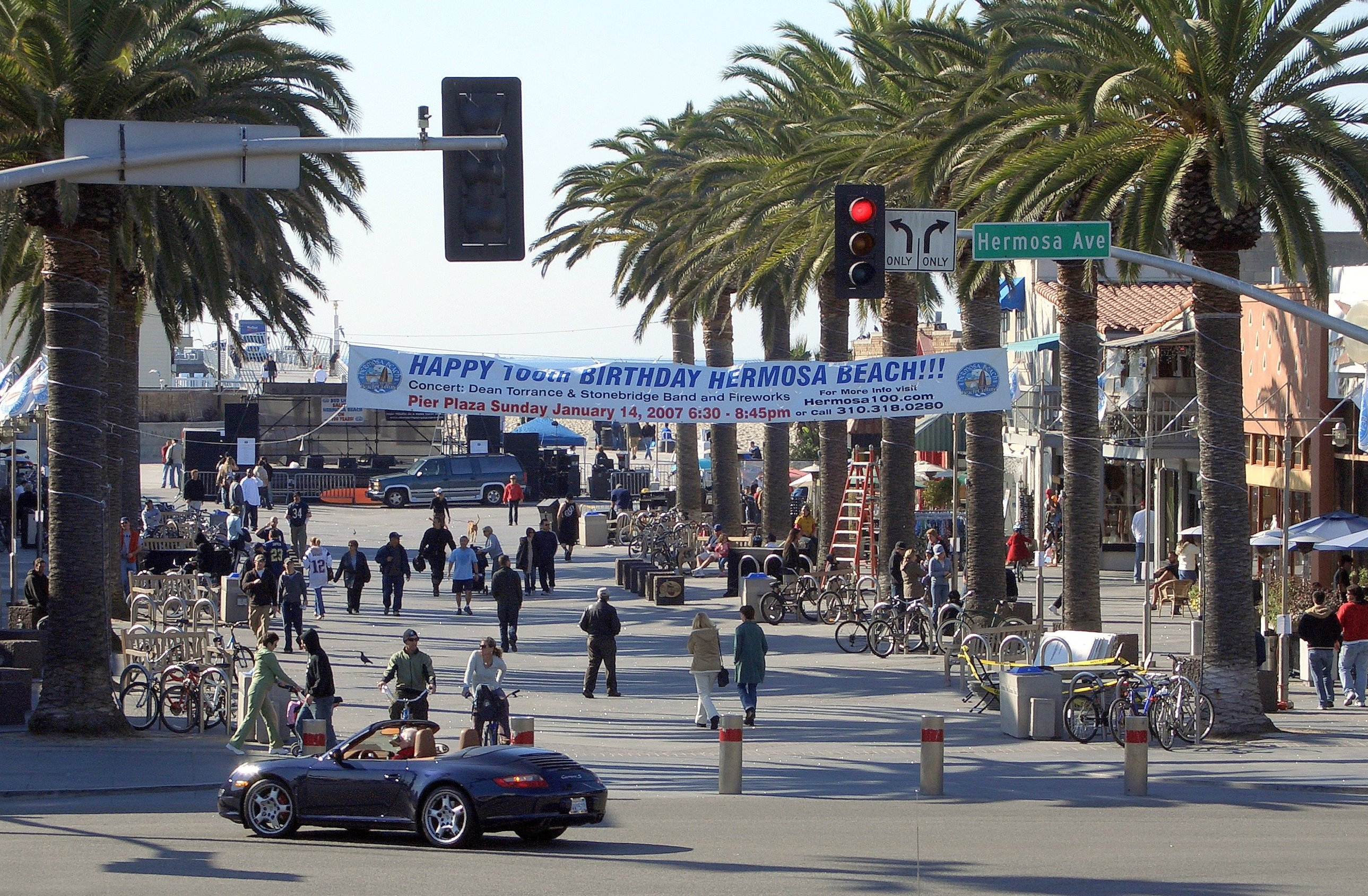
Pier Plaza in downtown Hermosa Beach

According to the United States Census Bureau, the city has a total area of 1.4 square miles (3.6 km^{2}), all land.

=== Climate ===
Average air temperature - (summer 74 °F (23 °C)/ winter, 55 °F (13 °C))

Average water temperature - 60 °F (16 °C) (summer 68 °F (20 °C)/ winter 50 °F (10 °C))

Climate data for Hermosa Beach, California
Month	Jan	Feb	Mar	Apr	May	Jun	Jul	Aug	Sep	Oct	Nov	Dec	Year
Record high °F (°C)	91 (33)	92 (33)	95 (35)	102 (39)	97 (36)	104 (40)	97 (36)	98 (37)	109 (43)	106 (41)	101 (38)	94 (34)	109 (43)
Mean daily maximum °F (°C)	65.7 (18.7)	65.7 (18.7)	66.4 (19.1)	68.3 (20.2)	70.0 (21.1)	72.5 (22.5)	75.7 (24.3)	77.0 (25.0)	76.4 (24.7)	73.9 (23.3)	69.9 (21.1)	65.4 (18.6)	70.6 (21.4)
Mean daily minimum °F (°C)	48.0 (8.9)	49.4 (9.7)	51.3 (10.7)	53.3 (11.8)	57.0 (13.9)	59.9 (15.5)	63.0 (17.2)	63.6 (17.6)	62.5 (16.9)	58.5 (14.7)	52.4 (11.3)	47.8 (8.8)	55.6 (13.1)
Record low °F (°C)	27 (−3)	34 (1)	35 (2)	42 (6)	45 (7)	48 (9)	52 (11)	51 (11)	47 (8)	43 (6)	38 (3)	32 (0)	27 (−3)
Average precipitation inches (mm)	3.02 (77)	3.09 (78)	2.49 (63)	0.62 (16)	0.25 (6.4)	0.08 (2.0)	0.03 (0.76)	0.15 (3.8)	0.22 (5.6)	0.40 (10)	1.11 (28)	1.76 (45)	13.20 (335)

Hermosa Beach has an average of 325 days of sunshine a year. Because of its location, nestled on a vast open bay (Santa Monica Bay), morning fog and haze is a common phenomenon in May, June and early July (caused by ocean temperature variations and currents). Locals have a particular terminology for this phenomenon: the "May Gray" and the "June Gloom". Overcast skies are common for June mornings, but usually the strong sun burns the fog off by noon. Nonetheless, it will sometimes stay cloudy and cool all day during June, even as other parts of the Los Angeles area will enjoy sunny skies and warmer temperatures. At times, the sun shines east of PCH, while the beach area is overcast.

As a general rule, the temperature is from 5 to 10 °F (−15 to −12 °C) cooler than it is inland. A typical spring day (mid-April) is sunny, pleasant and about 68 °F (20 °C). In the summer, which stretches basically from May to late October, temperatures can reach to the mid-80s Fahrenheit (about 30 °C) at the beach. In early November, it is about 68 °F (20 °C). In late January, temperatures are around 63 °F (17 °C). It is winter, however, when the hot, dry Santa Ana winds are most common. In mid-December 2004, temperatures soared to 84 °F (29 °C) in Santa Monica, for a few straight days, with perfectly sunny skies.

The rainy season is from late October through late March. Winter storms usually approach from the northwest and pass quickly through the Southland. There is very little rain during the rest of the year, on average, there is just about 14 inches of rain per year in the city.

Hermosa Beach usually enjoys a cool breeze blowing in from the ocean, keeping the air fresh and clean. Therefore, smog is less a problem for Hermosa Beach than elsewhere around Los Angeles.

== Demographics ==
Historical population
Census	Pop.	Note	%±
1910	679		—
1920	2,327		242.7%
1930	4,796		106.1%
1940	7,197		50.1%
1950	11,826		64.3%
1960	16,115		36.3%
1970	17,412		8.0%
1980	18,070		3.8%
1990	18,219		0.8%
2000	18,566		1.9%
2010	19,506		5.1%
2020	19,728		1.1%
U.S. Decennial Census; 1860–1870 1880-1890; 1900 1910 1920; 1930 1940 1950; 1960 1970 1980; 1990 2000 2010; 2020

Hermosa Beach first appeared as a city in the 1910 U.S. census as part of the now defunct Redondo Township.

=== Racial and ethnic composition ===
Hermosa Beach city, California – Racial and ethnic composition Note: the US Census treats Hispanic/Latino as an ethnic category. This table excludes Latinos from the racial categories and assigns them to a separate category. Hispanics/Latinos may be of any race.
Race / Ethnicity (NH = Non-Hispanic)	Pop 1980	Pop 1990	Pop 2000	Pop 2010	Pop 2020	% 1980	% 1990	% 2000	% 2010	% 2020
White alone (NH)	16,279	15,980	15,822	15,780	14,563	90.09%	87.71%	85.22%	80.90%	73.82%
Black or African American alone (NH)	175	197	141	216	195	0.97%	1.08%	0.76%	1.11%	0.99%
Native American or Alaska Native alone (NH)	98	74	51	28	31	0.54%	0.41%	0.27%	0.14%	0.16%
Asian alone (NH)	350	681	809	1,097	1,371	1.94%	3.74%	4.36%	5.62%	6.95%
Native Hawaiian or Pacific Islander alone (NH)	350	681	35	43	20	1.94%	3.74%	0.19%	0.22%	0.10%
Other race alone (NH)	36	20	38	52	152	0.20%	0.11%	0.20%	0.27%	0.77%
Mixed race or Multiracial (NH)	x	x	417	658	1,332	x	x	2.25%	3.37%	6.75%
Hispanic or Latino (any race)	1,132	1,267	1,253	1,632	2,064	6.26%	6.95%	6.75%	8.37%	10.46%
Total	18,070	18,219	18,566	19,506	19,728	100.00%	100.00%	100.00%	100.00%	100.00%

=== 2020 census ===
As of the 2020 census, Hermosa Beach had a population of 19,728. The population density was 13,834.5 inhabitants per square mile (5,341.5/km^{2}).

The racial makeup of the city was 76.6% White, 1.0% African American, 0.3% Native American, 7.1% Asian, 0.1% Pacific Islander, 2.5% from other races, and 12.3% from two or more races. Hispanic or Latino residents of any race were 10.5% of the population.

The census reported that 99.9% of the population lived in households, 0.1% lived in non-institutionalized group quarters, and no one was institutionalized. 100.0% of residents lived in urban areas, while 0.0% lived in rural areas.

There were 9,247 households, of which 23.6% had children under the age of 18. Of all households, 38.6% were married-couple households, 8.9% were cohabiting couple households, 26.8% had a male householder with no spouse or partner present, and 25.7% had a female householder with no spouse or partner present. About 36.0% of households were one person, and 8.0% had someone living alone who was 65 years of age or older. The average household size was 2.13, and there were 4,633 families (50.1% of all households).

The age distribution was 17.5% under the age of 18, 5.9% aged 18 to 24, 34.1% aged 25 to 44, 29.1% aged 45 to 64, and 13.4% aged 65 or older. The median age was 40.1 years. For every 100 females, there were 104.9 males, and for every 100 females age 18 and over there were 104.7 males.

There were 10,038 housing units at an average density of 7,039.3 units per square mile (2,717.9 units/km^{2}). Of these, 9,247 (92.1%) were occupied, 45.6% were owner-occupied, and 54.4% were occupied by renters. The homeowner vacancy rate was 1.2%, the rental vacancy rate was 5.1%, and 7.9% of housing units were vacant.

=== 2023 American Community Survey estimates ===
In 2023, the US Census Bureau estimated that the median household income was $152,019, and the per capita income was $110,660. About 3.7% of families and 5.3% of the population were below the poverty line.

=== 2010 census ===
The 2010 United States census reported that Hermosa Beach had a population of 19,506. The population density was 13,673.6 inhabitants per square mile (5,279.4/km^{2}). The racial makeup of Hermosa Beach was 16,928 (86.8%) White (80.9% Non-Hispanic White), 229 (1.2%) African American, 49 (0.3%) Native American, 1,111 (5.7%) Asian, 46 (0.2%) Pacific Islander, 325 (1.7%) from other races, and 818 (4.2%) from two or more races. There were 1,632 residents of Hispanic or Latino ancestry, of any race (8.4%).

The Census reported that 19,491 people (99.9% of the population) lived in households, 11 (0.1%) lived in non-institutionalized group quarters, and 4 (0%) were institutionalized.

There were 9,550 households, out of which 1,878 (19.7%) had children under the age of 18 living in them, 3,254 (34.1%) were opposite-sex married couples living together, 460 (4.8%) had a female householder with no husband present, 325 (3.4%) had a male householder with no wife present. There were 710 (7.4%) unmarried opposite-sex partnerships, and 64 (0.7%) same-sex married couples or partnerships. 3,644 households (38.2%) were made up of individuals, and 606 (6.3%) had someone living alone who was 65 years of age or older. The average household size was 2.04. There were 4,039 families (42.3% of all households); the average family size was 2.80.

There were 3,093 residents (15.9%) under the age of 18, 1,242 (6.4%) aged 18 to 24, 8,516 (43.7%) aged 25 to 44, 4,898 (25.1%) aged 45 to 64, and 1,757 (9.0%) who were 65 years of age or older. The median age was 37.0 years. For every 100 females, there were 111.3 males. For every 100 females age 18 and over, there were 112.1 males.

There were 10,162 housing units at an average density of 7,123.5 per square mile (2,750.4/km^{2}), of which 4,255 (44.6%) were owner-occupied, and 5,295 (55.4%) were occupied by renters. The homeowner vacancy rate was 1.0%; the rental vacancy rate was 4.4%. 10,083 people (51.7% of the population) lived in owner-occupied housing units and 9,408 people (48.2%) lived in rental housing units.

According to the 2010 United States census, Hermosa Beach had a median household income of $101,655, with 3.4% of the population living below the federal poverty line.

== Economy ==
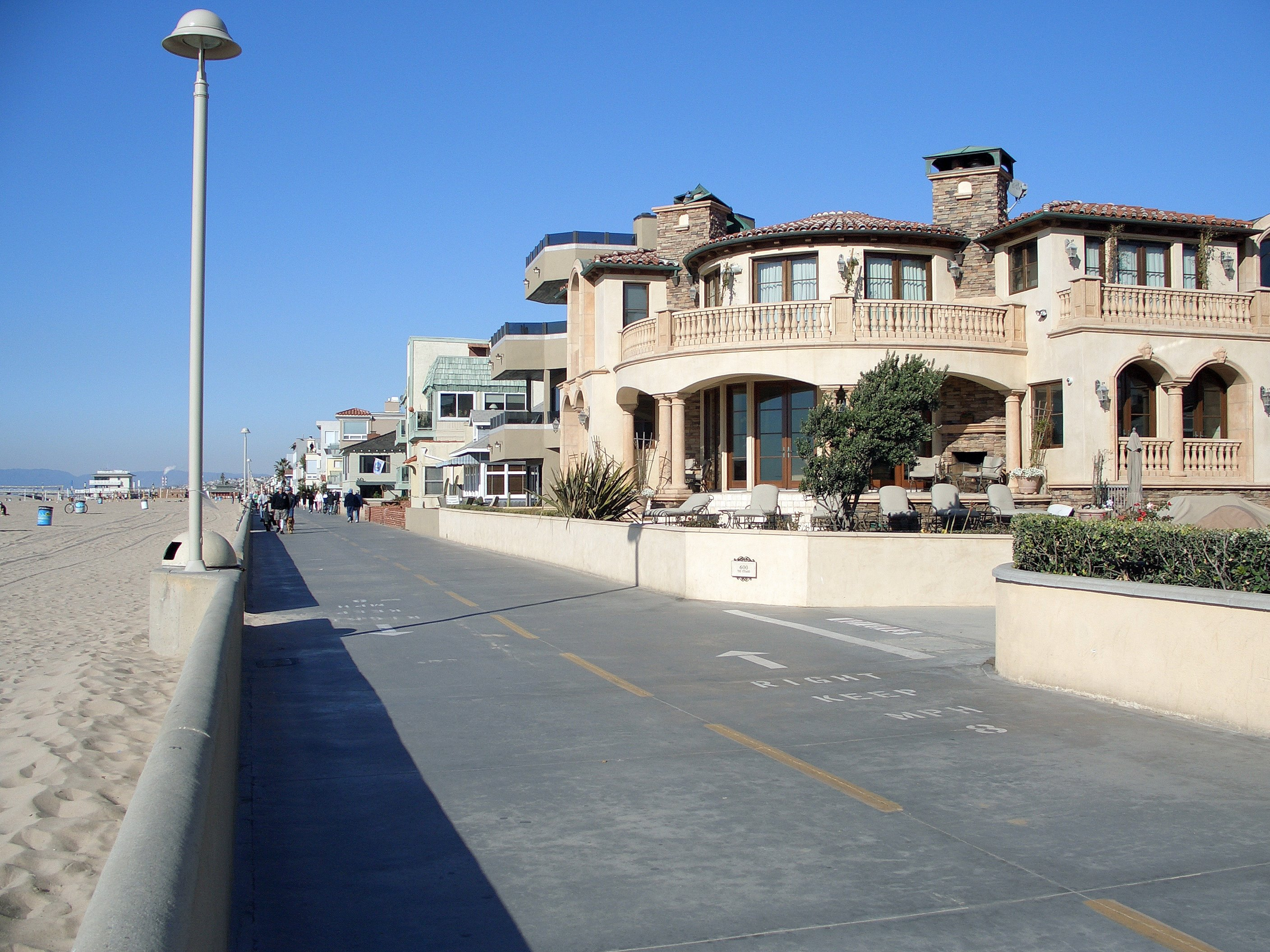
6th and The Strand Hermosa Beach

In 2024, the most common occupations of residents were management, sales, and administrative support. The top employers were: City of Hermosa Beach (168); Von's Companies (121); Lazy Acres (107); Trader Joe's (94); Hermosa Beach School District (90).

The city has 32.5 acres (13.2 ha) of beach, and 1,570 parking meters.

== Arts and culture ==
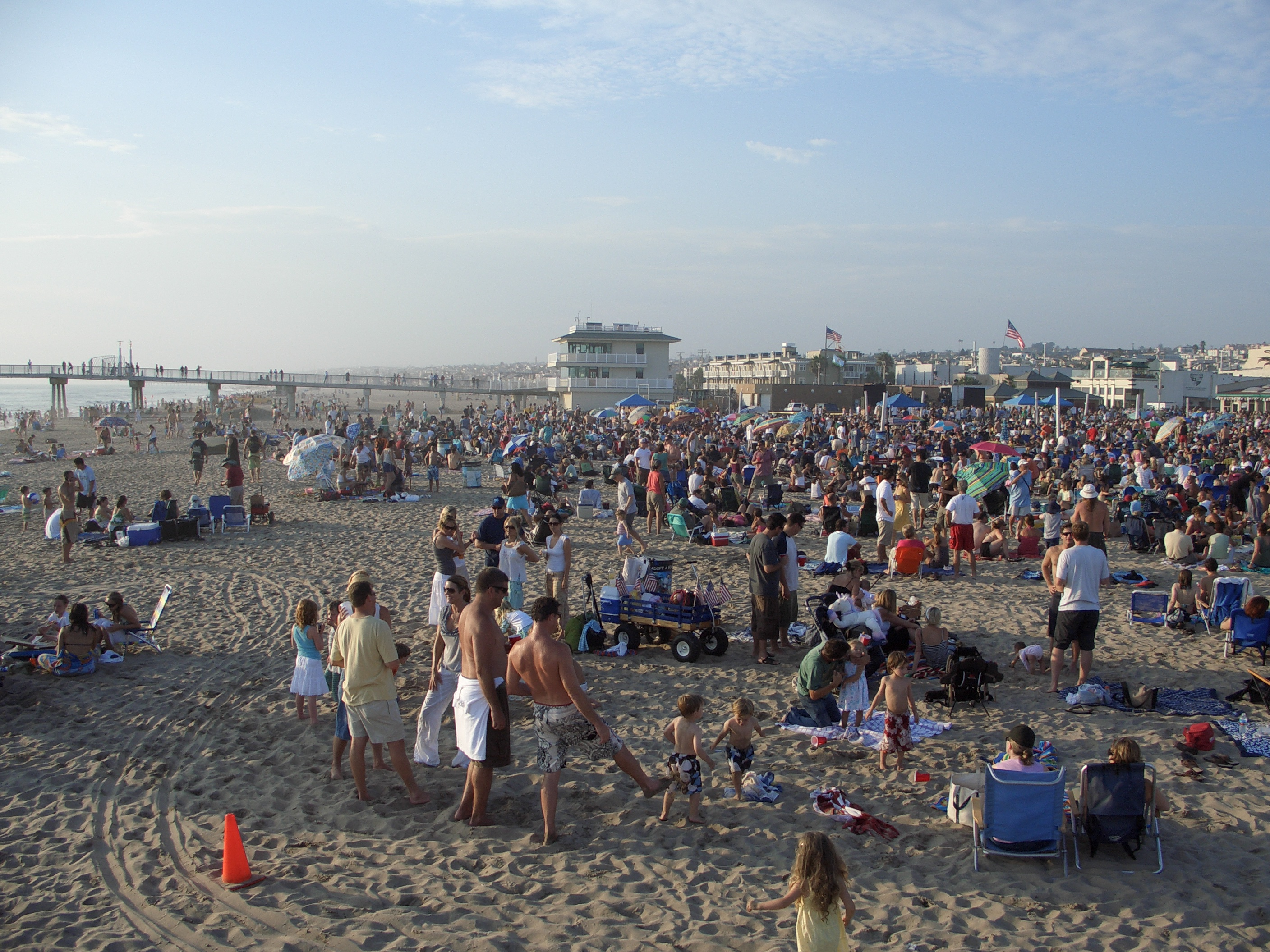
Hermosa Beach sunset concert

- Fiesta Hermosa: Arts and crafts festival which has taken place for the last 35 years every Memorial Day and Labor Day weekend
- Hermosa Ironman: Unofficial triathlon every July 4, consisting of running a mile in the sand, paddling a mile on a surfboard, and downing a 6-pack of beer. "First to finish without puking wins!"
- AVP Hermosa Beach Open: Started in 1969 and typically in June. Attracts combinations of pros and near pros. Free event open to everyone.
- ShockBoxx Art Gallery: Located at 6th & Cypress in the arts district. Showcasing domestic and international artists with avant-garde style themes. Free and open to the public. Check the website for show dates.
- Hermosa Beach Film Festival: Started in 2005 and typically in August. Short films from each year are chosen to be screened at the Hermosa Beach Playhouse
- International Surf Festival: Surfing, paddleboarding, pier to pier swim events. Beginning of August
- Hennessey's Paddle Board Festival: U.S. Paddleboard Championships. Typically in July.
- Hermosa Beach Sunset Concert free concert series from bands who perform on the beach. Starts July 31 – August 21 (4 weeks)
- Farmers' Market Every Friday from 12 noon to 4 pm, rain or shine. (Valley Drive between 8th and 10th Streets) Also, every Wednesday from 1pm to 6pm in the Pier Plaza (by the pier)
- Sand and Strand Run The second oldest standing run in the L.A. area. Unique is its course design, with 45% of the run on the Strand and 55% on the beach. February during low tide.
- Shakespeare by the Sea: the South Bay's free Shakespeare in the Park company. Performances run June through August in a variety of venues in Los Angeles and Orange County.
- The Lighthouse Cafe, a seminal West Coast jazz venue, is located in Hermosa Beach.
- The Hermosa Beach Community Drum Circle occurs every third Sunday of the month from noon to 3 pm at Hermosa Pier.
- The Comedy and Magic Club where comedian Jay Leno has been performing since 1978.
- Hermosa has a rich history in punk rock music, with many notable bands including Black Flag, Redd Kross, The Descendents, Pennywise, OFF! and Circle Jerks having all lived or rehearsed in town over the years.
- Hermosa Beach Pride, an LGBTQ+ pride parade and festival, has taken place annually in June since 2021.

== Parks and recreation ==
The wide flat beach makes Hermosa Beach one of the most popular places to play beach volleyball, from professional to amateur. Hermosa Beach is home to the AVP Hermosa Beach Open tournament, and several amateur CBVA tournaments during the year. The Strand stretches north to Santa Monica and south to Redondo Beach, and is a popular place for walkers, joggers and biking. Of the three Beach Cities, only Hermosa Beach owns its own beach. The other two cities' beaches are owned by the county of Los Angeles.

Running parallel to The Strand is a lovely linear trail known today as the Hermosa Valley Greenbelt. Once part of a railroad easement, this narrow 24-acre (97,000 m^{2}) strip had long been the subject of heated controversy and pressure from various commercial interests. After years of litigation and wrangling, the city was poised to permit intensive retail and condominium development in the mid-1980s when a grassroots group spearheaded by activist Rosamond Fogg forced the matter to a vote. The City Council at the time was divided over whether the matter was of much importance but after an energetic and passionate campaign, the citizens found that the greenbelt was a vital recreational resource and mandated its preservation for the use and enjoyment of residents and visitors. This ballot initiative passed by almost 87%, the highest in California history. On the same Ballot, the public approved a referendum added a utility user's tax by 2% to help pay for the purchase, to be sunset after the property was acquired. As a result, the Hermosa Valley Greenbelt has the quality of a rural country lane, home to the monarch butterfly and many bird and animal species. At any time of day or night joggers and walkers enjoy its soft woodchip trails and graceful landscaping. The Greenbelt is also now part of the federal rails to trails network. The AIA R/UDAT (Regional/Urban Design Assistance Team) found that Hermosa Beach, thanks in large part to the existence of the Greenbelt, was a "world class pedestrian city".

== Government ==
=== Local government ===
According to the 2009 Comprehensive Annual Financial Report, the city's various funds had $32.4 million in revenues, $33.9 million in expenditures, $93.8 million in total assets, $12.2 million in total liabilities, and $23.0 million in cash and investments.

The Beach Cities Health District, provides health and wellness services to the residents of Hermosa Beach, Manhattan Beach, and Redondo Beach. The voters of the three beach cities elect the 5-member Board of Directors to 4-year terms. One of 78 California Health Districts, it was created in 1955 as South Bay Hospital and took on its current name in 1993. Beach Cities Health District opened AdventurePlex, a Manhattan Beach fitness center for kids and their families, in 2002. Filled with mazes, tunnels, outdoor rock climbing walls, complex ropes courses, and an indoor gym, AdventurePlex challenges children physically and intellectually in health-focused recreational activities.

The United States Postal Service Hermosa Beach Post Office is located at 565 Pier Avenue.

The Los Angeles County Fire Department has a sectional lifeguard headquarters located at the Hermosa Beach Pier since the new building opened its doors since 2006, currently commanded by Capt. Tracy Lizzotte who leads the entire "Team HB" as part of "Team South" in the L.A. County Lifeguard. Currently located at 1200 The Strand housed a lifeguard garage where response vehicles have parked.

=== Politics ===
In the California State Legislature, Hermosa Beach is in the 24th senatorial district, represented by Democrat Ben Allen, and in the 66th Assembly district, represented by Democrat Al Muratsuchi.

In the United States House of Representatives, Hermosa Beach is in California's 36th congressional district, represented by Democrat Ted Lieu.

In the 2008 presidential election, Barack Obama won 61% of the vote compared to 36% for John McCain.

== Education ==
=== Public schools ===
Hermosa Beach has its own elementary school and middle school but high school students are served by either Manhattan Beach or Redondo Beach where rankings are in the 80 to 90th percentiles. Hermosa Beach residents are zoned to Hermosa Beach City School District for grades Kindergarten through 8. Before Proposition 13 passed, Hermosa Beach had five elementary schools (North, South, Hermosa View, Prospect Heights, Valley Vista) and one junior high school (Pier Avenue).

Residents of Hermosa Beach were in South Bay Union High School District until 1993, when it dissolved.

In 2005, Hermosa Valley and Hermosa View schools were honored as U.S. Department of Education National Blue Ribbon Schools, along with 33 California schools and less than 300 schools across the nation. The award was based on academic achievement. Hermosa schools are among the top 10% of schools in the state with students scoring at or above the 90% in the highest grade tested in reading and math. For the award, the Department of Education reviewed growth in scores over a three-year period.

The district has three schools:

- Hermosa View Elementary (Pre-k to Grade 2)
- Hermosa Vista Elementary (Grades 3 and 4)
- Hermosa Valley Middle (Grades 5 through 8)

At the high school level, public school students can choose between two schools:

- Mira Costa High School of Manhattan Beach Unified School District or
- Redondo Union High School of the Redondo Beach Unified School District

The Hermosa Beach City School District as a whole received a score of 915 on the 2006 California Academic Performance Index, neighboring Manhattan Beach Unified School District scored just below at 906 making it one of California's best performing districts. Each individual school also ranks at the top of its respective category.

School	2006 API Score
Hermosa View Elementary	950
Hermosa Vista Elementary	
Hermosa Valley Middle	910
Mira Costa High School	852

=== Private schools ===
Hermosa Beach also has one private school:

- Our Lady of Guadalupe School, is a Catholic school with classes TK thru the Eighth Grade. Although it is a religious school, there is no convent so all classes are taught by state credentialed teachers.

At one point the International Bilingual School, a Japanese preparatory school for grades K-9, moved to Hermosa Beach. In 1992 the school moved to Palos Verdes Estates.

== Media ==
In addition to the Los Angeles Times, Hermosa Beach is served by the hometown Easy Reader, local daily the Daily Breeze and local weekly the Beach Reporter.

== Filming location ==
Film

- Carrie (1976)
- Surf II (1984)
- Hardbodies (1987)
- Back to the Beach (1987)
- My Stepmother Is an Alien (1988)
- Men at Work (1990)
- Side Out (1990)
- Point Break (1991)
- Jackie Brown (1997)
- La La Land (2016)

TV

- The TV show Summerland was partly filmed here.
- Scenes of the TV show The O.C. were filmed on the Hermosa Beach Strand, Pier and Plaza.
- The Beach House on the TV show Beverly Hills, 90210 is located on the north end of The Strand (1994/1995 seasons).
- The city was the site of the start and the first task on The Amazing Race 31.
- In 2019, the fourth season of Veronica Mars filmed primarily in Hermosa Beach, mainly at the Sea Sprite Hotel.

Photography

- Hermosa's coastline was the site of "Tragedy by the Sea", a Pulitzer-winning photograph taken by local photographer John L. Gaunt.

== Notable people ==
- Denise Austin (born 1957) – fitness instructor and husband Jeff Austin live in Hermosa Beach.
- Jason Acuña (born 1973) – skateboarder and Jackass TV personality, lives in Hermosa
- Brent Barry (born 1971) – professional basketball player, lives in Hermosa
- James M. Bell (1837–1919), U.S. Army brigadier general, retired to Hermosa Beach
- Jack Black (born 1969) – actor, grew up in Hermosa
- Black Flag (founded 1976)- hardcore punk band
- Kevin Burkhardt (born 1974) – Fox Sportscaster – Lives in Hermosa Beach
- Bill Butler (born 1921) – cinematographer
- A.J. Cook (born 1978) – actor
- Ted Coombs (born 1954) – author of For Dummies computer book series
- Adrianne Curry (born 1982) – first winner of America's Next Top Model, lives in Hermosa
- Carson Daly (born 1973) – television personality
- Jacqueline Frank DeLuca (born 1980) – bronze medalist, water polo, 2004 Olympics, born in Hermosa
- Descendents (formed 1977) – punk band
- Grayson Doody (born 2002) – soccer player
- Morgan Ensberg (born 1975) – baseball player
- Jim Finn (born 1976) – football player
- Eric Fonoimoana (born 1969) – professional AVP volleyball player
- Fortunate Youth (formed 2009) – reggae rock band formed by Hermosa Beach residents
- John L. Gaunt (1924–2007) – LA Times photographer and 1955 Pulitzer Prize winner.
- Jim Grabb (born 1964) – tennis player ranked World No. 1 in doubles
- LeRoy Grannis (1917–2011) – surf photographer, co-founder of Surfing magazine
- Kyle Harrison (born 1983) – professional lacrosse player and 2005 Tewaaraton Trophy winner
- Rachel Hunter (born 1969) – model
- Jarret Stoll (born 1982) – hockey player
- Kelly Kahl (born 1966) – television executive
- Mia Klein – winemaker
- Jimmy Kimmel (born 1967) – television personality
- Christopher Knight (born 1957) – actor, The Brady Bunch
- Andrea Lee – golfer
- Kim Lyons (born 1973) – personal trainer on The Biggest Loser and Dr. Phil
- Steve Lyons (born 1960) – baseball player and broadcaster
- Gavin MacIntosh (born 1999) – actor, The Fosters and American Fable
- Mae Marsh (1894–1968) – former actress
- Misty May-Treanor (born 1977) – Olympic gold medalist and AVP pro volleyball player
- Tiffany Montgomery (born 1982) – contestant on American Idol
- Warren Miller (1924–2018) – filmmaker on extreme sports
- Rodney Mullen (born 1966) – professional skateboarder
- Ozzie (1906–1975) and Harriet Nelson (1909–1994) – entertainers, actors, TV personalities
- Dylan O'Brien (born 1991) – actor and musician, known for MTV's Teen Wolf
- Meghan Ory (born 1982) – actress
- Ty Page (1953–2017) – professional skateboarder
- Pennywise (formed 1988) – skate punk/melodic hardcore band
- Raymond Pettibon (born 1957) – artist largely associated with the LA Punk scene, notably Black Flag
- Teri Polo – actress, Meet the Parents
- John Reardon (born 1975) – actor and football player
- Peter Revson (1939–1974) – race car driver
- Adam Royer (born 1989) – The Real World: Las Vegas
- Bill Simpson (1940–2019) – race car driver
- Michael Strahan (born 1971) – NFL player and television personality
- Daniel Tosh (born 1975) – television personality
- Leonard Wibberley (1915–1983) – author of The Mouse That Roared

== Sister city ==
Hermosa Beach has been the sister city of Loreto, Baja California Sur, since 1967.

== See also ==
- Anderson v. City of Hermosa Beach
- Hermosa Beach oil drilling controversy
