= Pampa Hermosa District, Ucayali =

Coordinates: 7.1991°S 75.8605°W

Pampa Hermosa District
- District
- Location of Pampa Hermosa in the Ucayali province
- Country: Peru
- Region: Loreto
- Province: Ucayali
- Founded: September 15, 1961
- Capital: Pampa Hermosa

Government
  - Mayor: Luis Del Castillo Tananta

Area
  - Total: 7,346.98 km^{2} (2,836.68 sq mi)
- Elevation: 132 m (433 ft)

Population (2005 census)
  - Total: 5,067
  - Density: 0.6897/km^{2} (1.786/sq mi)
- Time zone: UTC-5 (PET)
- UBIGEO: 160604

Pampa Hermosa District is one of six districts of the province Ucayali in Peru. Among its indigenous inhabitants are groups of Kichwa-Lamista people who have migrated to the area from Lamas and Biabo since the 1970s.
