= Redondo =

Redondo (Spanish and Portuguese for "rotund" or "round") may refer to:

== Places ==
=== Antarctica ===
- Redondo Point, a headland

=== Costa Rica ===
- Redondo Hill Private Wildlife Refuge

=== Ecuador ===
- Redondo Rock, in the Galapagos Islands

=== Philippines ===
- Redondo Peninsula, on Luzon Island

=== Portugal ===
- Redondo, Portugal, a municipality in southeastern Portugal
  - Castle of Redondo
  - Count of Redondo, a Portuguese title of nobility
  - Palace of the Counts of Redondo

=== United States ===
- Redondo, Des Moines, Washington
- Redondo Beach, California, formerly known as Redondo
  - Hotel Redondo, a former hotel
  - Redondo Union High School
  - Redondo Union High School District
  - Redondo Junction, California, a railroad maintenance facility
    - Redondo Junction train accident
  - Redondo's Moonstone Beach, a former tourist attraction
- Redondo Peak, a summit in New Mexico
- Redondo Reservoir, Arizona

== People ==
- Redondo (surname)

== Other uses ==
- Redondo wine, Portuguese

== See also ==
- Novo Redondo, former name of Sumbe, a city in Angola
- Redonda (disambiguation)
- Redondo Beach (disambiguation)
