= Redondo (surname) =

Redondo is a surname. Notable people with the surname include:

- Alba Redondo (born 1996), Spanish association football player
- Alberto Redondo (born 1997), Spanish association football player
- Aldhila Ray Redondo (born 1996), Indonesian footballer
- Alejandro Abrines Redondo (born 1993), Spanish basketball player
- Ana Redondo García (born 1966), Spanish politician
- Andrea Blanco-Redondo (active from 2008), Spanish photonics engineer and physicist
- Aurora Redondo (1900–1996), Spanish actress.
- Cayetano Redondo Aceña (1888–1940), Spanish politician, typographer, journalist and Esperantist
- Dionisio Redondo González (active 1979–1982), Spanish rower
- Dolores Redondo (born 1969), Spanish writer
- Emiliano Redondo (1937–2014), Spanish film and television actor
- Encarnación Redondo Jiménez (born 1944), Spanish politician
- Federico Redondo (born 2003), Argentine footballer
- Fernando Redondo (disambiguation), multiple people
- Iván Redondo (born 1981), Spanish political advisor
- Frank Flores Redondo (born 1984), Venezuelan football manager
- Gonzalo Diéguez y Redondo (1897–1955), Spanish diplomat
- Jesus Redondo (born 1934), Spanish comic artist
- Jorge Rafael Videla Redondo (1925–2013), Argentine military dictator
- José Antonio Redondo (disambiguation), multiple people
- Jose Maria Redondo (1830–1878), Mexican-American entrepreneur and politician
- Jose Monino y Redondo, Conde de Floridablanca (1728–1808), Spanish statesman
- Juan Redondo (born 1977), Spanish /footballer
- Juan Sergio Redondo (born 1976 or 1977), Spanish historian and politician
- Kenny Prince Redondo (born 1994), Ethiopian footballer
- Laura Redondo (born 1988), Spanish athlete specialising in the hammer throw
- Lidia Redondo (born 1992), Spanish rhythmic gymnast
- Lidia Redondo de Lucas (1966–2018), Spanish politician
- Luis Redondo (born 1973), Honduran politician and engineer
- Luismi Redondo (born 1998), Spanish/ footballer
- Manuel Redondo (born 1985), Spanish footballer
- Marco Vinicio Redondo Quirós (active from 2014), Costa Rican politician
- Marita Redondo (born 1956), American tennis player
- Mike Redondo (born 1984), American politician
- Nicolás Rey y Redondo (1834–1917), Spanish ecclesiastic
- Nestor Redondo (1928–1995), Filipino comic book artist, brother of Virgilio
- Nicolás Redondo (1927–2023), Spanish trade unionist and politician
- Onésimo Redondo (1905–1936), Spanish politician
  - Monument to Onésimo Redondo, Valladolid
- Pablo Redondo (born 1982), Spanish footballer
- Ricardo Gallego Redondo (born 1959), Spanish footballer
- Vicente Romero Redondo (born 1956), Spanish painter and educator
- Virgilio Redondo (1926–1997), Filipino comic book writer and artist, brother of Nestor
- Walter Redondo (born 1958), American artist and tennis player

== See also ==
- Redondo (disambiguation)
