= Vicente Romero =

Vicente Romero may refer to:

- Vicente Romero (footballer) (born 1987), Spanish footballer
- Vicente Romero (actor) (born 1969), Spanish actor
- Vicente Romero Fernández (born 1955), general of the Peruvian National Police
- Vicente Romero Redondo (born 1956), Spanish painter and educator
