= Buckshot, Arizona =

CDP in Yuma County, Arizona

- CDP
- Location within the state of Arizona Buckshot (the United States)
- Coordinates: 32°44′25″N 114°28′58″W
- Country: United States
- State: Arizona
- County: Yuma

Area
  - Total: 0.32 sq mi (0.83 km^{2})
  - Land: 0.30 sq mi (0.78 km^{2})
  - Water: 0.019 sq mi (0.05 km^{2})
- Elevation: 157 ft (48 m)

Population (2020)
  - Total: 70
  - Density: 231.3/sq mi (89.29/km^{2})
- Time zone: UTC-7 (MST)
- ZIP code: 85365
- Area code: 928
- FIPS code: 04-08020
- GNIS feature ID: 2582742

Buckshot is a census-designated place (CDP) in Yuma County, Arizona, United States. The population was 153 at the 2010 census.

Redondo Lake, a reservoir holding seepage from the Gila Gravity Main Canal, is located to the north of Buckshot.

== Geography ==
Buckshot is located in the Gila River Valley.

== Demographics ==
Historical population
Census	Pop.	Note	%±
2010	153		—
2020	70		−54.2%
U.S. Decennial Census

Buckshot first appeared on the 2010 U.S. Census as a census-designated place (CDP).

As of the 2010 census, there were 153 people living in the CDP: 85 male and 68 female. 29 were 19 years old or younger, 10 were ages 20–34, 13 were between the ages of 35 and 49, 28 were between 50 and 64, and the remaining 73 were aged 65 and above. The median age was 63.8 years.

The racial makeup of the CDP was 92.2% White, 3.3% American Indian 0.7% Black or African American, 2.0% Other, and 2% two or more races. 29.4% of the population were Hispanic or Latino of any race.

There were 66 households in the CDP, 51 family households (77.3%) and 15 non-family households (22.7%), with an average household size of 2.32. Of the family households, 44 were married couples living together, 1 single father and 6 single mothers; while the non-family households included 14 adults living alone: 10 male and 4 female.

The CDP contained 75 housing units, of which 66 were occupied and 9 were vacant.

== Education ==
Buckshot is served by the Yuma Elementary School District and the Yuma Union High School District.

The zoned elementary and middle schools are Desert Mesa Elementary School and Castle Dome Middle School. Gila Ridge High School is the zoned high school.
