= Laguna, Yuma County, Arizona =

Laguna, Arizona
- Populated place
- Location within the state of Arizona Laguna (the United States)
- Coordinates: 32°49′08″N 114°29′08″W
- Country: United States
- State: Arizona
- County: Yuma
- Elevation: 157 ft (48 m)
- Time zone: UTC-7 (Mountain (MST))
  - Summer (DST): UTC-7 (MST)
- ZIP codes: 85369
- Area code: 928
- FIPS code: 04-39230
- GNIS feature ID: 25329

Laguna is a populated place situated in Yuma County, Arizona, United States. It is one of two places in Arizona with this name, the other being located in Pinal County. It has an estimated elevation of 1,608 feet (490 m) above sea level.

Gold placers were discovered in the area in 1850s, which led to the settlement coming into existence in the 1860s as a mining town. Laguna was located near the site of what would become the Laguna Diversion Dam, on the Colorado River, at the west end of the Laguna Mountains. One of the facilities comprising the U.S.'s Desert Training Center, Camp Laguna, was named after this location and the nearby mountains of the same name.

== Education ==
Laguna is served by the Yuma Elementary School District and the Yuma Union High School District.
