= Camp Laguna =

US WWII army training camp (Yuma, Arizona)

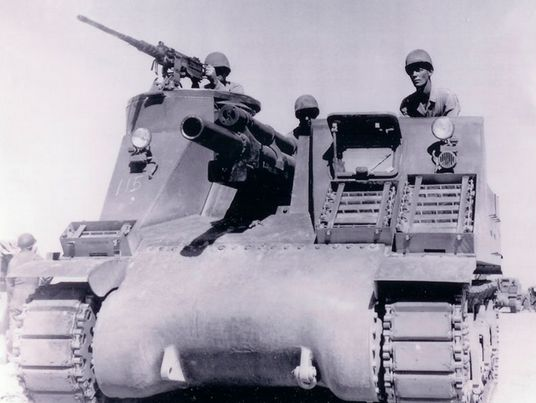
- M4 self-propelled 105 mm artillery at Camp Laguna in 1943

- Location within Arizona
- 32°58′29″N 114°21′06″W
- Location: Yuma Proving Ground, Arizona

History
- Built: April of 1942

Site notes
- Architect: US Army

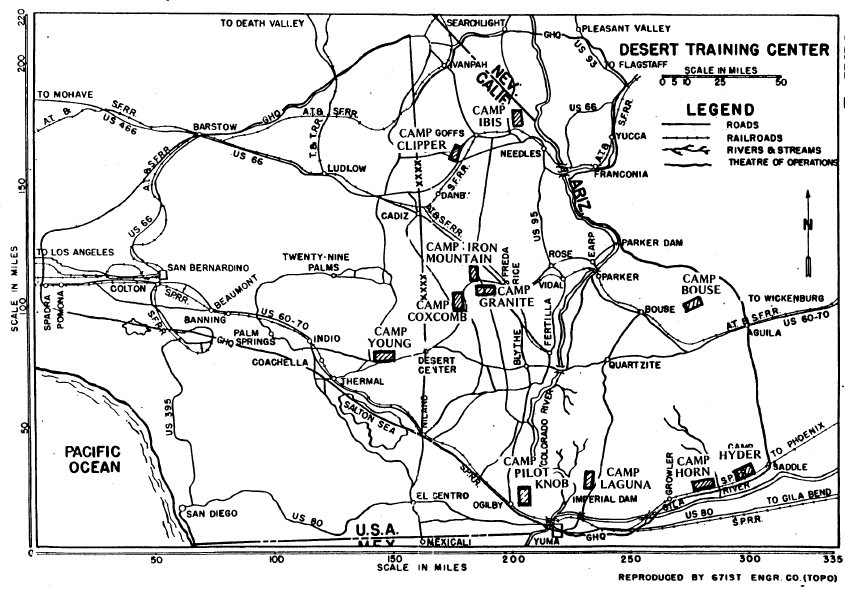
Map of Desert training center with Camp Laguna

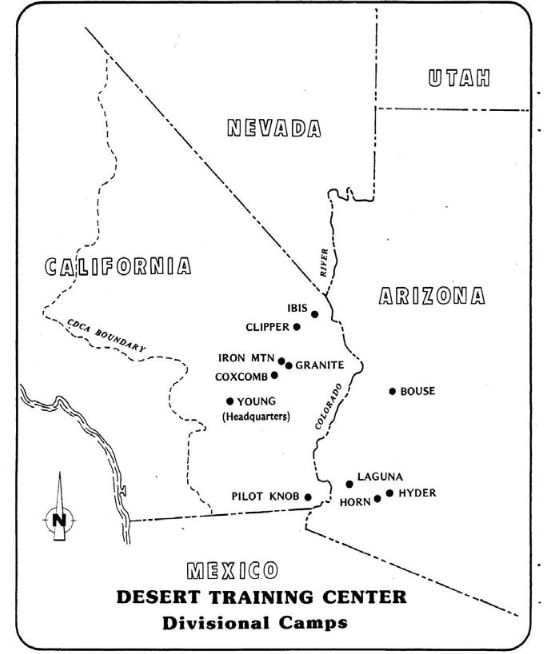
Desert Training Center map US Army 1943

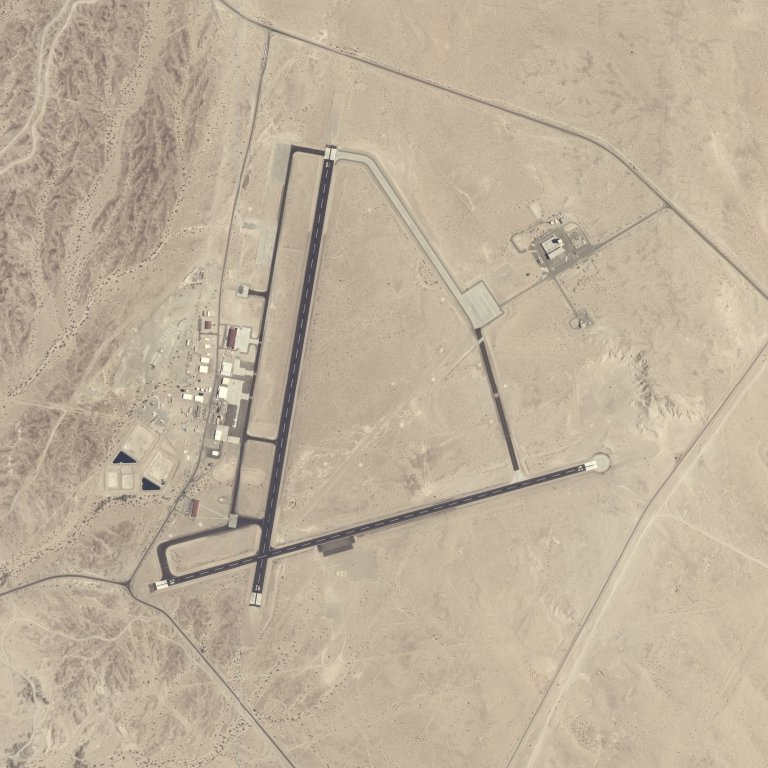
Laguna Army Airfield at the Yuma Test Center

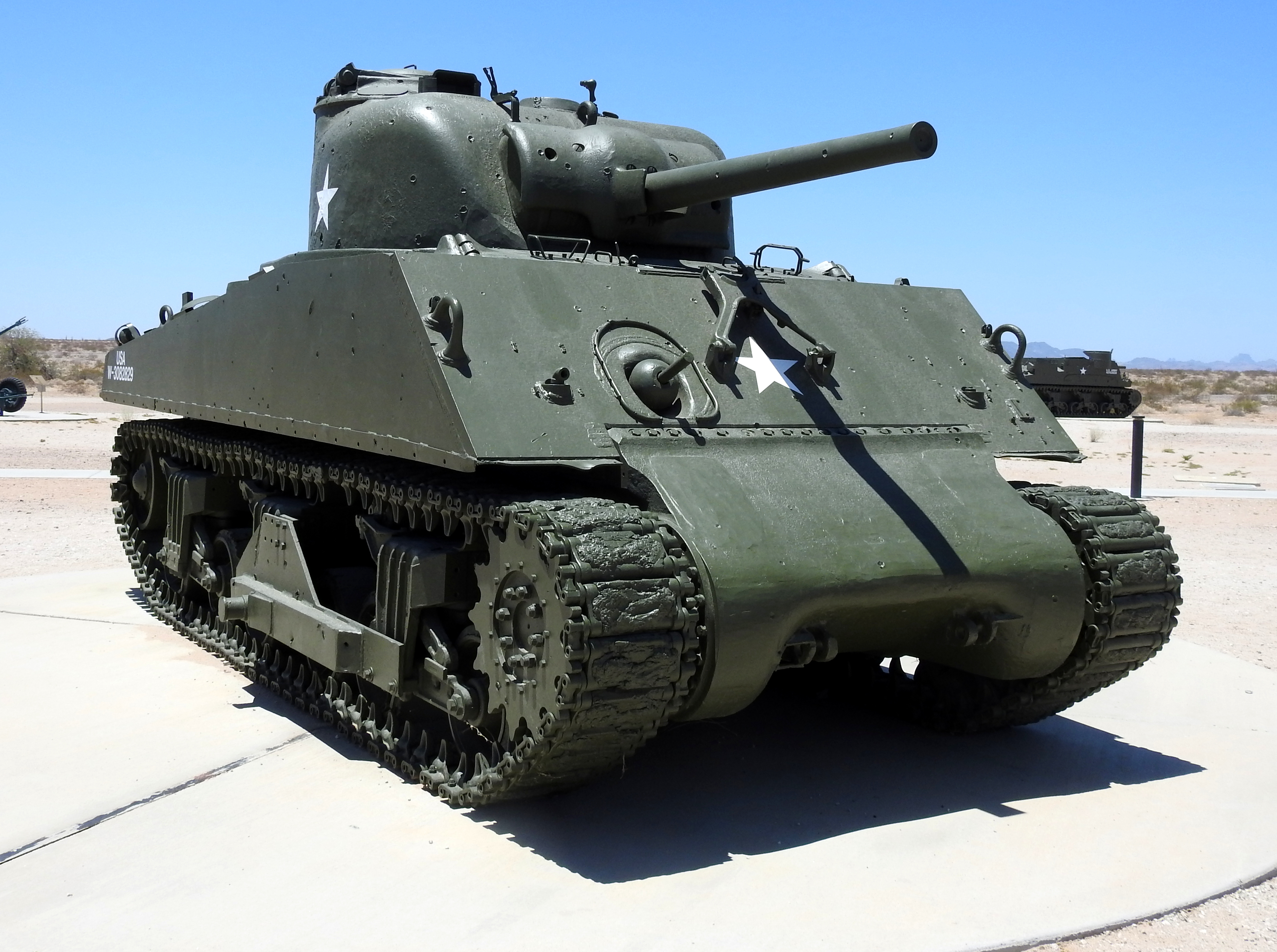
WW2 M4A3 Sherman Tank at the Wahner E. Brooks Historical Exhibit

The Camp Laguna was a sub camp of the US Army, Desert Training Center in Riverside County, California. The main headquarters for the Desert Training Center was Camp Young, this is where General Patton's 3rd Armored Division was stationed. Camp Laguna is 16 miles (26 km) miles northeast of Yuma, Arizona, off of U.S. Route 95. Trained at Camp Laguna were the 3rd Armored Divisions the 9th Armored Divisions, the 79th Infantry Divisions, 80th Infantry Divisions and 8th Infantry Division. The camp is named after the nearby town of Laguna, Yuma County, Arizona on the Colorado River. Camp Laguna was first World War II training camp built in the Sonoran Desert of Arizona, it trained thousands of troop for war. Most of the land that was Camp Laguna is now part of the vast Yuma Proving Ground.

Camp Laguna was built in April 1942. The Desert Training Center was built to prepare troops to do battle in North Africa to fight the Nazis during World War II. At the camp's railway station were two large stone columns marking the entrance to the camp. When completed the camp had shower buildings, latrines, wooden tent frames, water storage tanks and water treatment plant. The camp was closed in April 1944.

== Laguna Army Airfield ==
The Laguna Army Airfield (LGF) was built about 2 miles north of Camp Laguna. The army built the Laguna Army Airfield landing strip to support Camp Laguna's training activities. The runway was used for small planes, like the L-4 Piper Aircraft so the vast training grounds could be watched from the air. The runway was long enough for large planes to be used in training exercises also. It was one of many Arizona World War II Army Airfields. The Laguna Army Airfield is still in use today.

== Yuma Test Branch ==
Yuma Test Branch was built in 1943 northwest of Camp Laguna, in what is now the Yuma Proving Ground. The Yuma Test Branch, also called the Italians at the Yuma Test Branch, was built to test mobile bridge building equipment. The site is near the Colorado River, thus was ideal for testing mobile combat bridges, amphibious vehicles, and boats. Many Italian soldiers who became prisoners of war after the North African campaign turned and supported the United States in the Italian Service Units. These Italian were used at the Yuma Test Branch to help build the test combat bridges from 1944 to 1945. The Yuma Test Branch site was closed in 1949. In 1951 the site reopened as the Yuma Test Station. The site was renamed the Yuma Proving Ground in 1962.

== Wahner E. Brooks Historical Exhibit ==
At the place of the former Camp Laguna, now the grounds of Yuma Proving Ground is the Wahner E. Brooks Historical Exhibit. The exhibit has items on display from World War II and the Yuma Test Branch to present day equipment. The displays include:

- M4A3 Sherman Tank,
- Howitzers,
- XM51 Little John Rocket,
- Honest John Rocket,
- M2A1 40 MM Towed Antiaircraft Gun,
- M42A2 "Duster" Antiaircraft Artillery,
- M91 115.4.5 Inch multiple rocket launcher,
- Sergeant York 40MM Antiaircraft Weapons System,
- M74 Tank Recovery Vehicle,
- M47 Medium Tank,
- M728 Combat Engineer Vehicle,
- M551 "Sheridan" Armored Reconnaissance Airborne Assault Vehicle, and
- M113A1 Armored Personnel Carrier.

The Yuma Visitor Center offers addition information about Camp Laguna, Yuma Proving Ground and the surrounding areas. The US Army has a museums that also showcases the history of Camp Laguna, Yuma Proving Ground and the surrounding areas at the: Yuma Proving Ground Heritage Center.

== Historical Markers ==
Marker at the Camp Laguna (Wahner E. Brooks Historical Exhibit) site reads:

- Camp Laguna operated from April 1942 to April 1944. It was one of twelve such camps built in the southwestern deserts to train United States troops during World War II. The Desert Training Center, a simulated theater of operations, included portions of Arizona, California and Nevada. The other camps were Young, Coxcomb, Iron Mountain, Ibis, Clipper, Pilot Knob, Bouse, Granite, Horn, Hyder, and Rice. Over one million soldiers from approximately 400 units were trained at the center. These units included 13 infantry divisions, 7 armored divisions and numerous non-divisional units. Camp Laguna was the training site for the 3rd and 9th Armored Divisions, 79th Infantry Divisions, Italian service units and special bridge test section. Erected 1998 by Lost Dutchman Chapter 5917, Ancient and Honorable order of E Clampus Vitus, In cooperation with The United States Army, Yuma Proving Ground.

Marker at the Italians at the Yuma Test Branch site reads:

- During World War II, the Yuma proving ground of the United States Army Corps of Engineers was known as the Yuma Test Branch, which was used as a floating-bridge test facility. By 1944, more allied troop support was needed to conduct the bridge tests at the Yuma Test Branch. By this time, Italy had surrendered to the United States. A group of Italian prisoners-of-war, who were captured in North Africa, pledged their loyalty and support to the United States. These Italians were then formed into two Italian service units and were stationed at the Yuma Test Branch from 1944 to 1945 to assist in testing floating bridges. In addition to their bridge-building capability, they were talented in fine art, culinary art and stonemasonry. This concrete-lined stone-faced paint shed, decorated with three castles bearing the United States Army Corps of Engineers insignia and one castle inscribed with the word "Italy" was constructed by them to facilitate the safe storage of paint at the Yuma Test Branch. Because the temperature was cooler underground, the paint was stored below ground under all of the stone decorations, a method which was free of fire hazards.

== See also ==
- Camp Hyder AZ
- Camp Bouse AZ
- Camp Coxcomb
- Marine Corps Air Station Yuma
- Arizona World War II Army Airfields

== Wahner E. Brooks Historical Exhibit and Camp Laguna ==
The following are the images of the historic structures in Wahner E. Brooks Historical Exhibit, Camp Laguna and its surrounding areas.

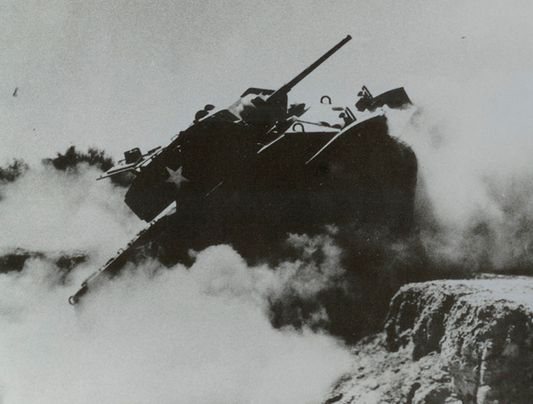
Tank coming out of wash Camp Laguna in 1943

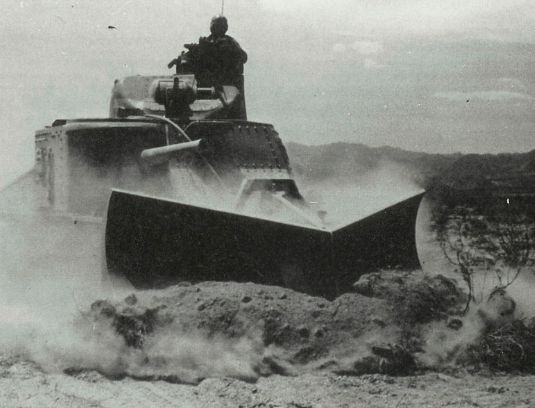
M3 Lee Tank Tank with blade test at Camp Laguna in 1942

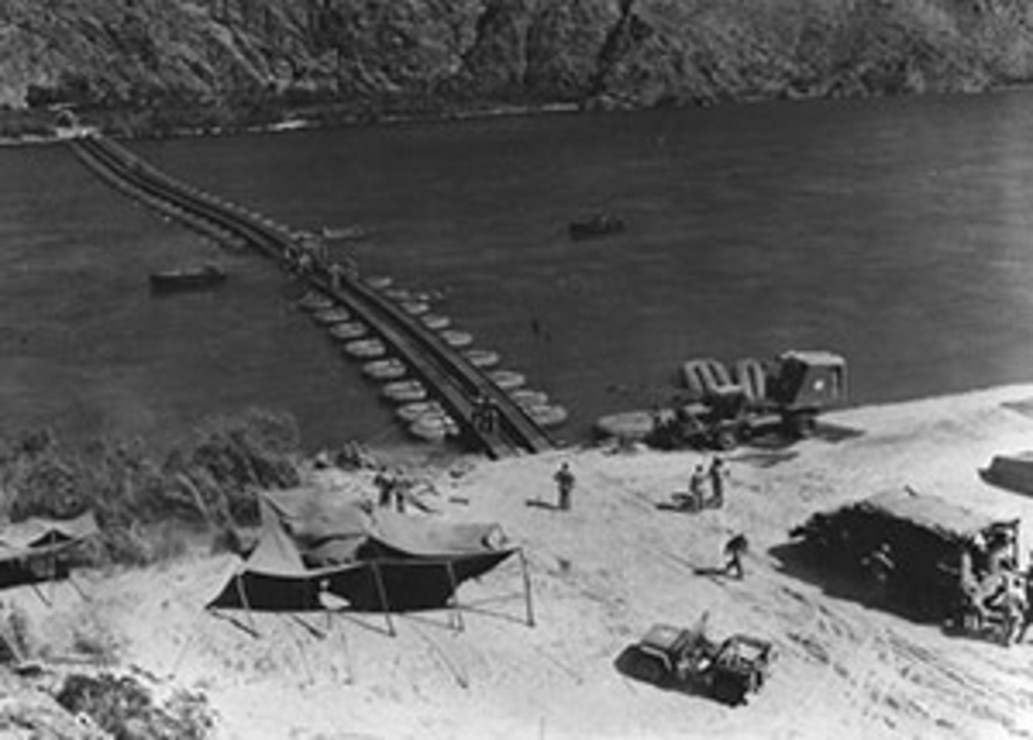
Mohave Maneuver Area C, river crossings training program in 1964

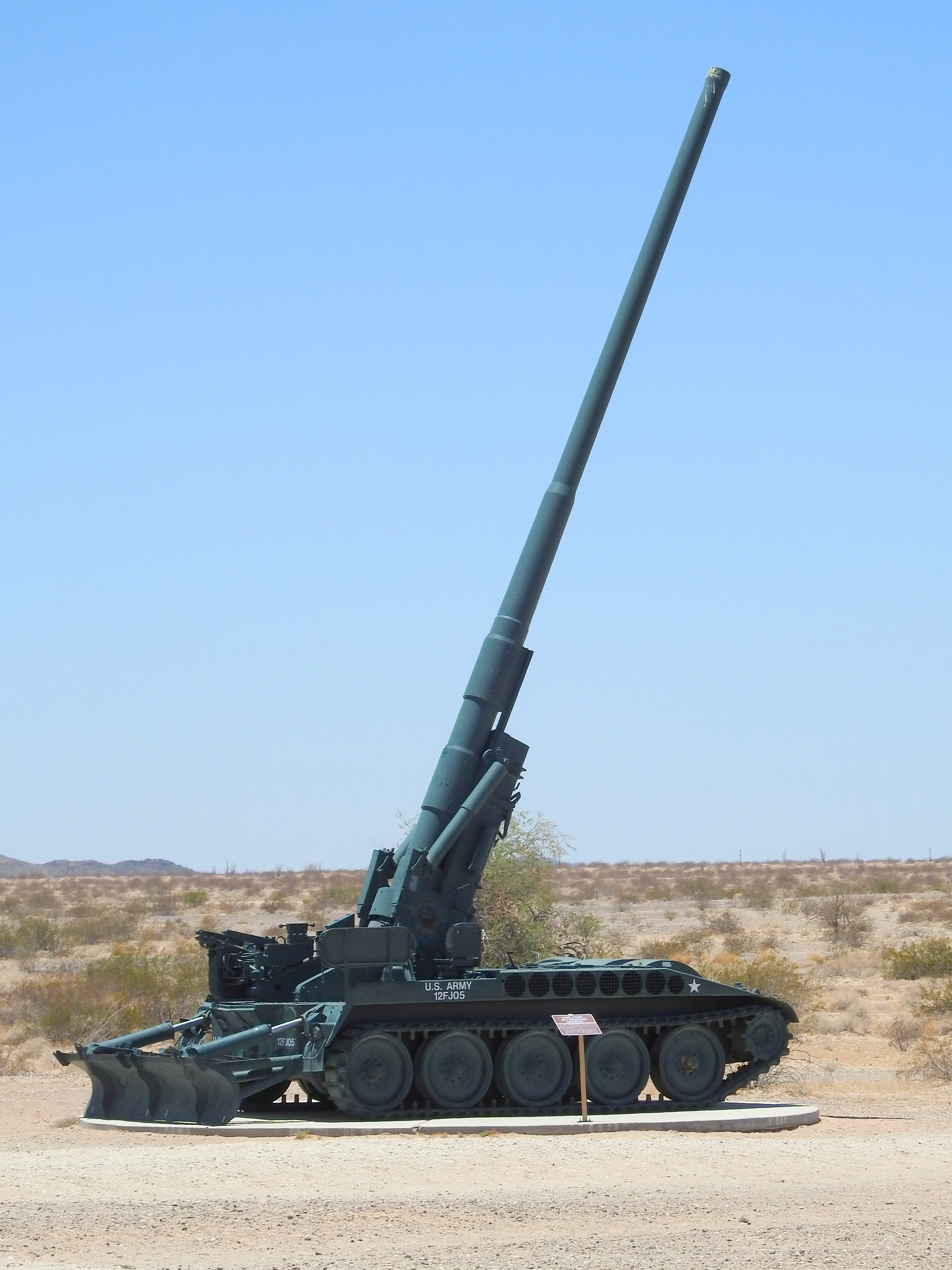
M107 175mm Self Propelled Gun

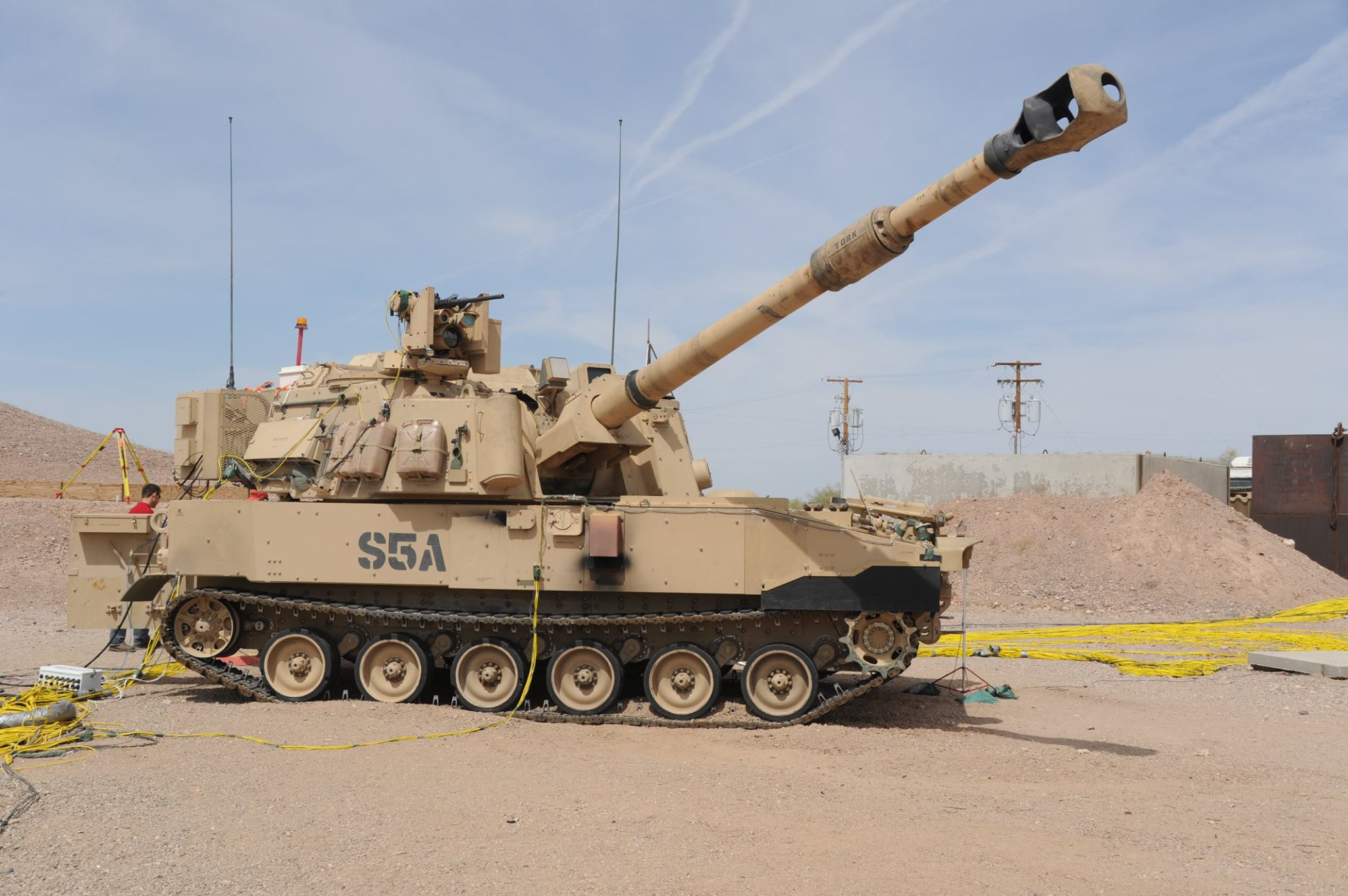
M109A7 Self-propelled Howitzer

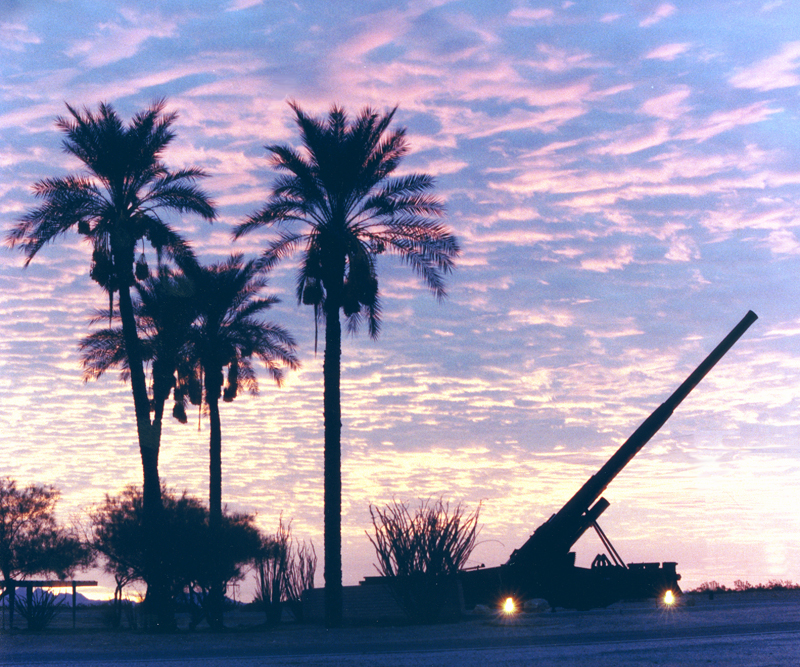
M107 175mm Self Propelled Gun

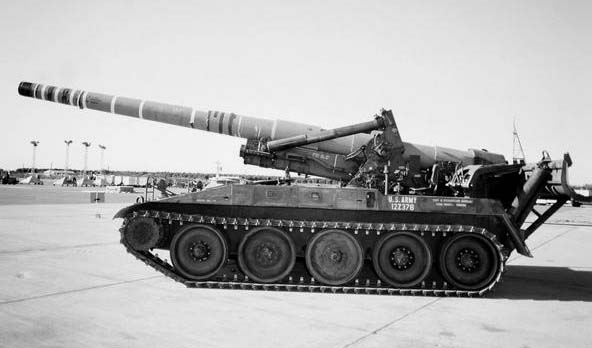
M110 203 mm howitzer

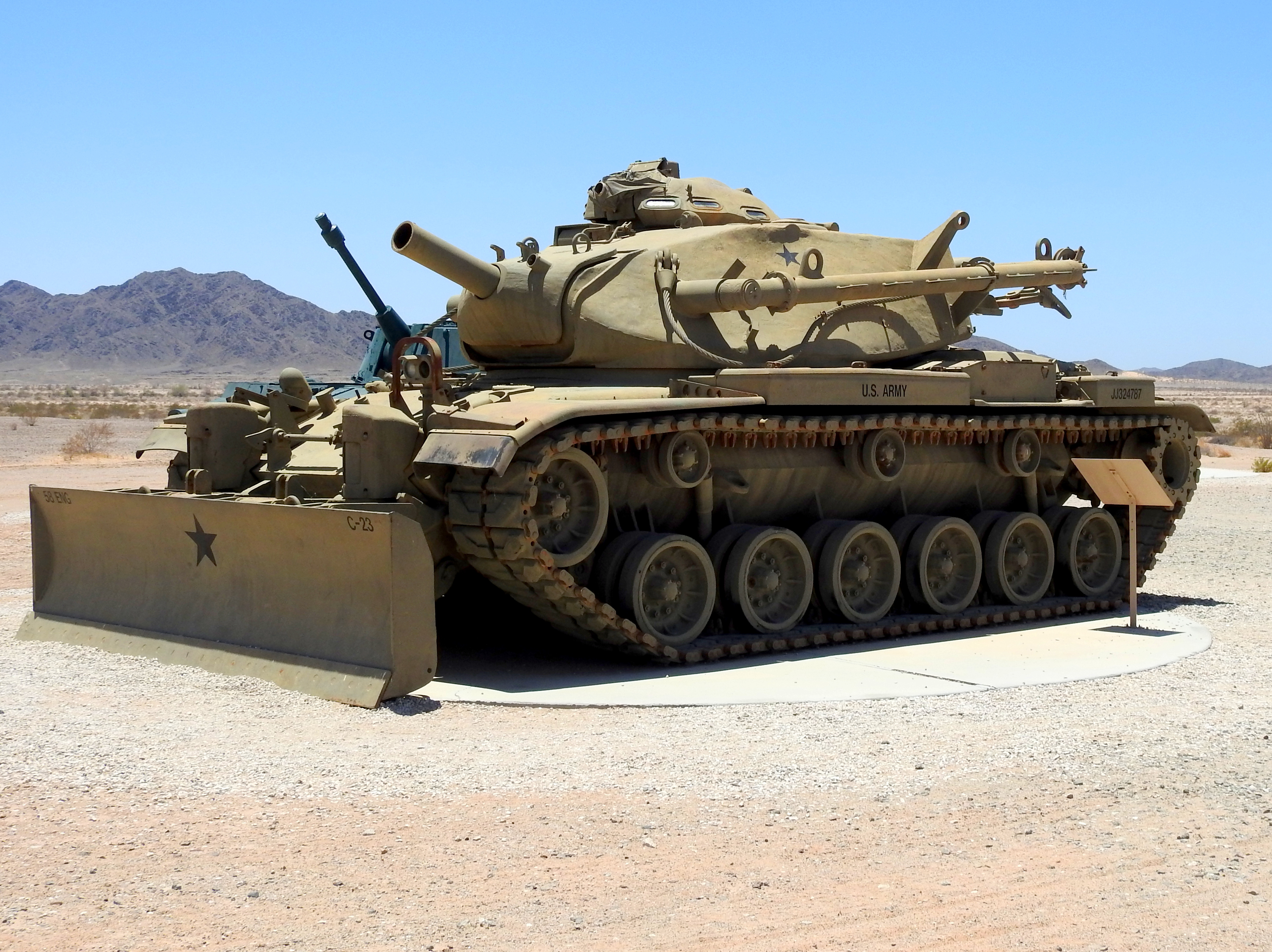
M728 Combat Engineer Vehicle (CEV) with 165mm Demolition Gun.

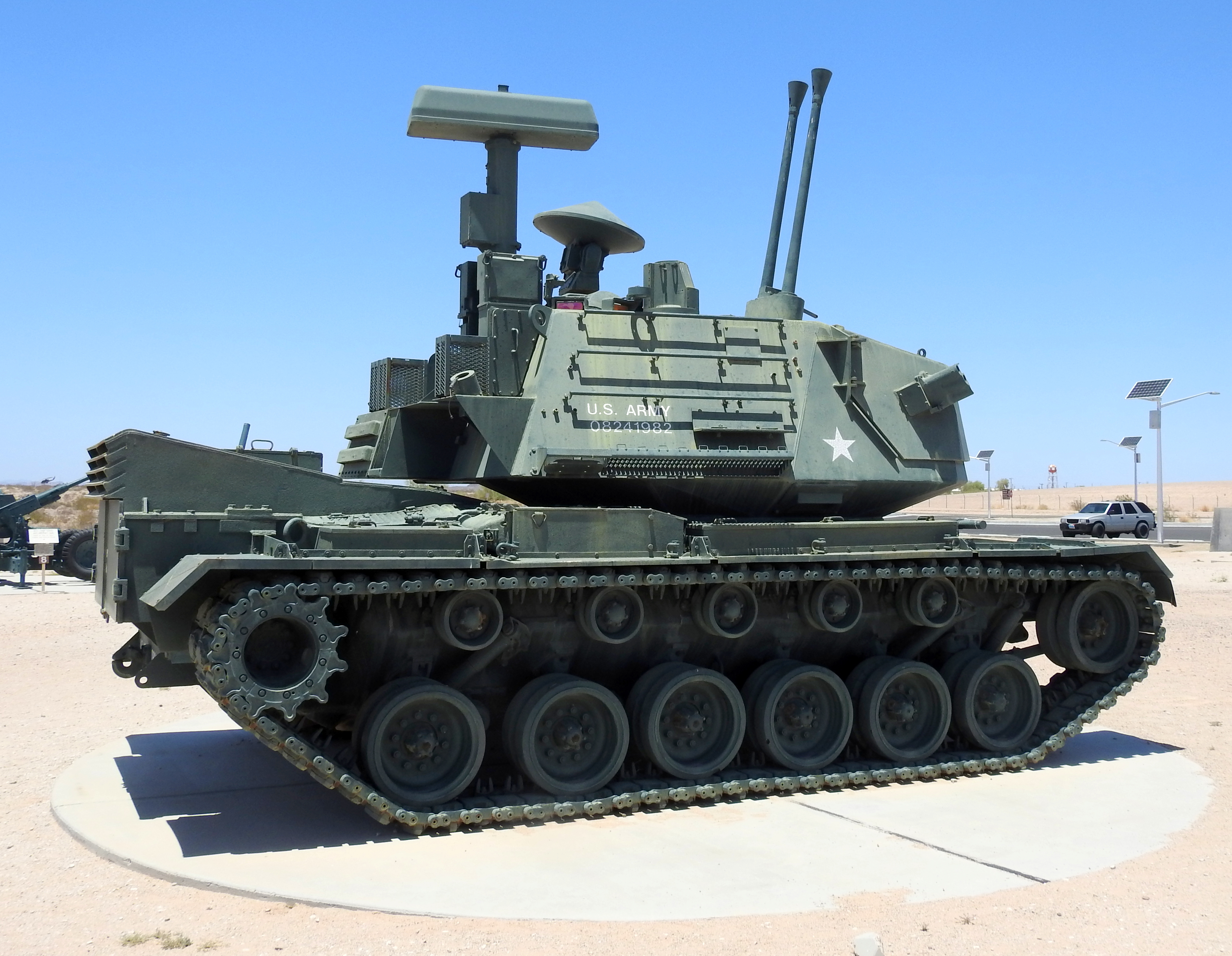
M247 "Sgt York" DIVAD (Division Air Defense) twin 40mm self propelled air defense gun.

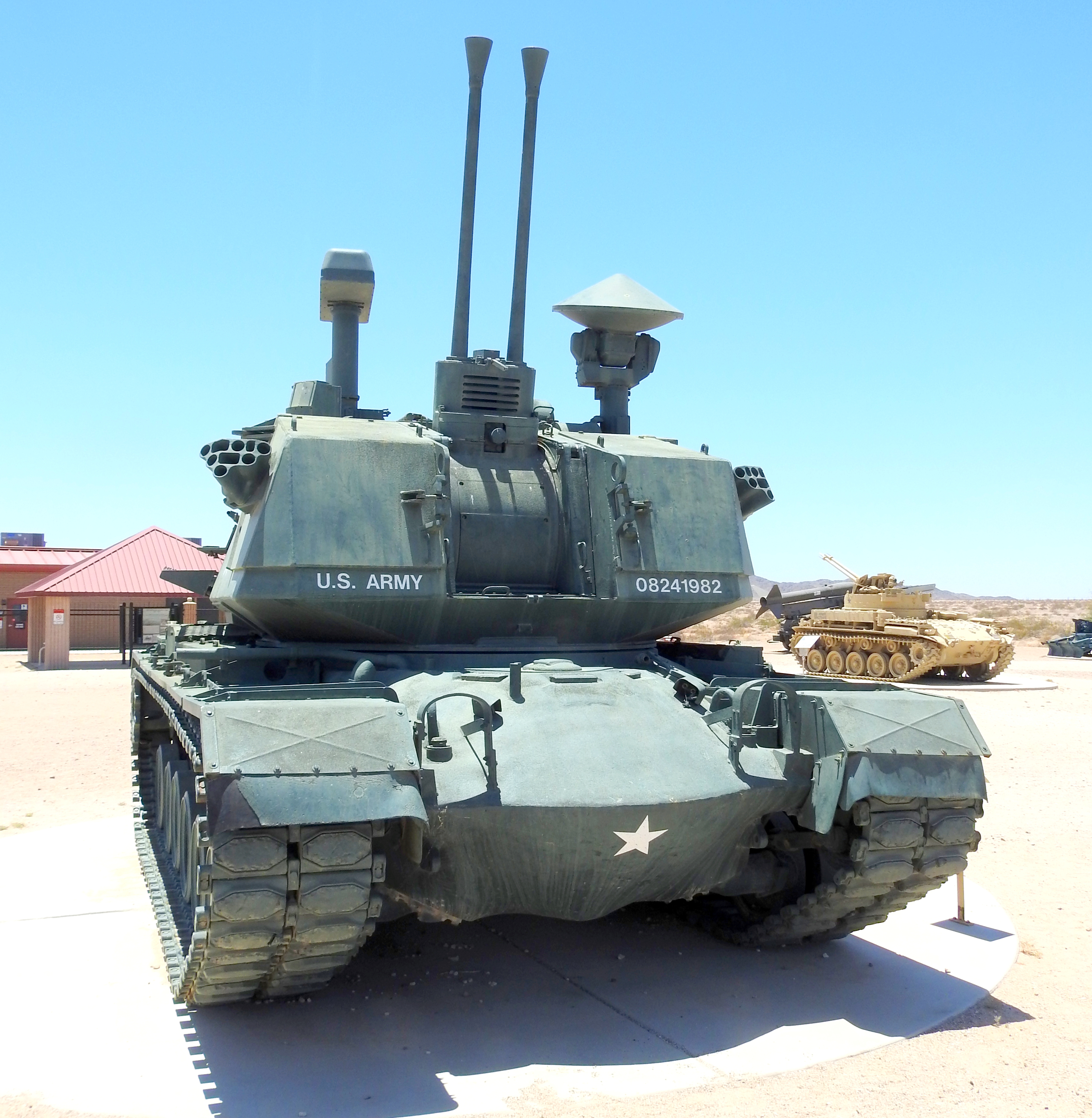
M247 "Sgt York" DIVAD (Division Air Defense) twin 40mm self propelled air defense gun

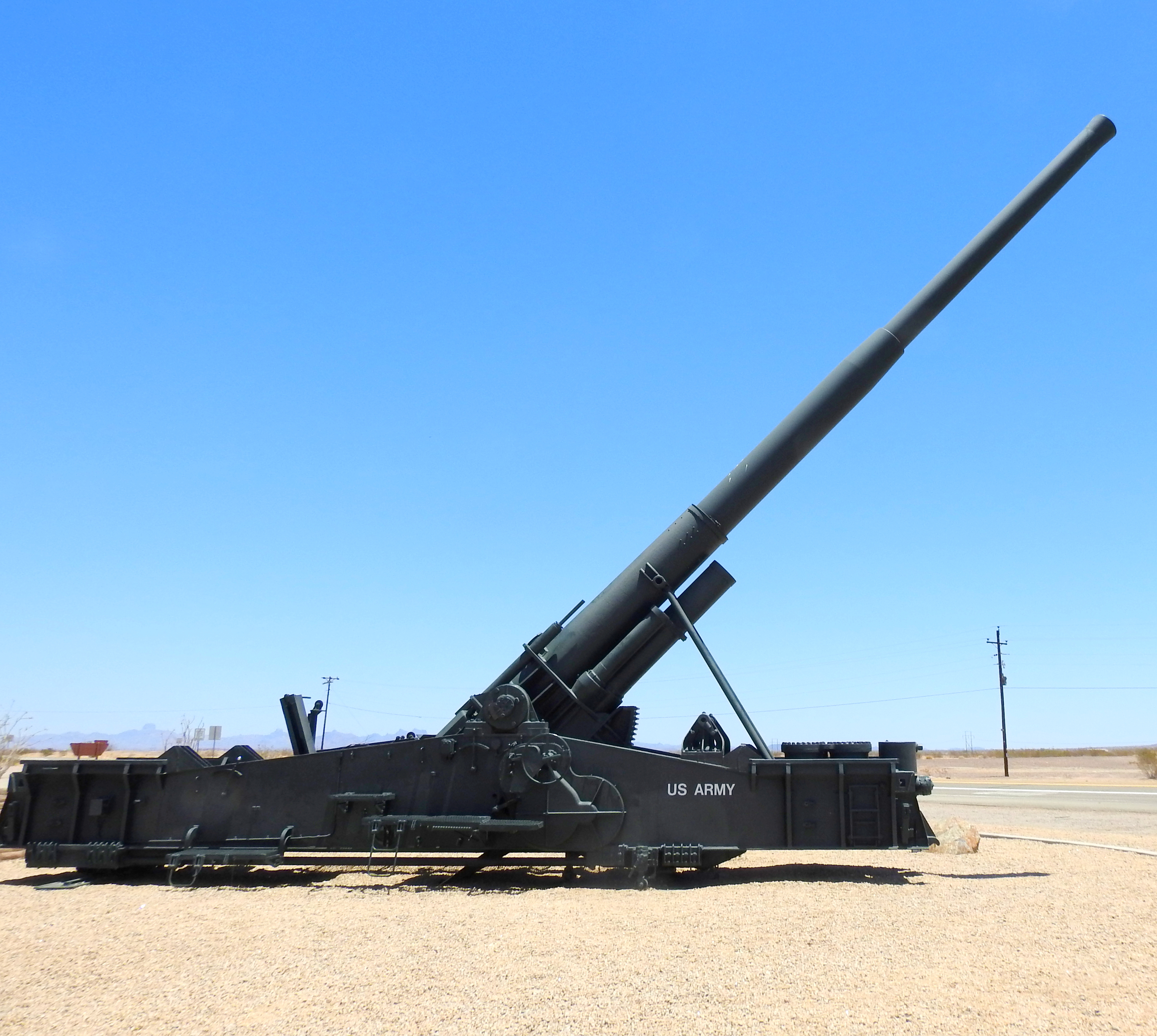
M65 280mm "Atomic Cannon", aka "Atomic Annie".

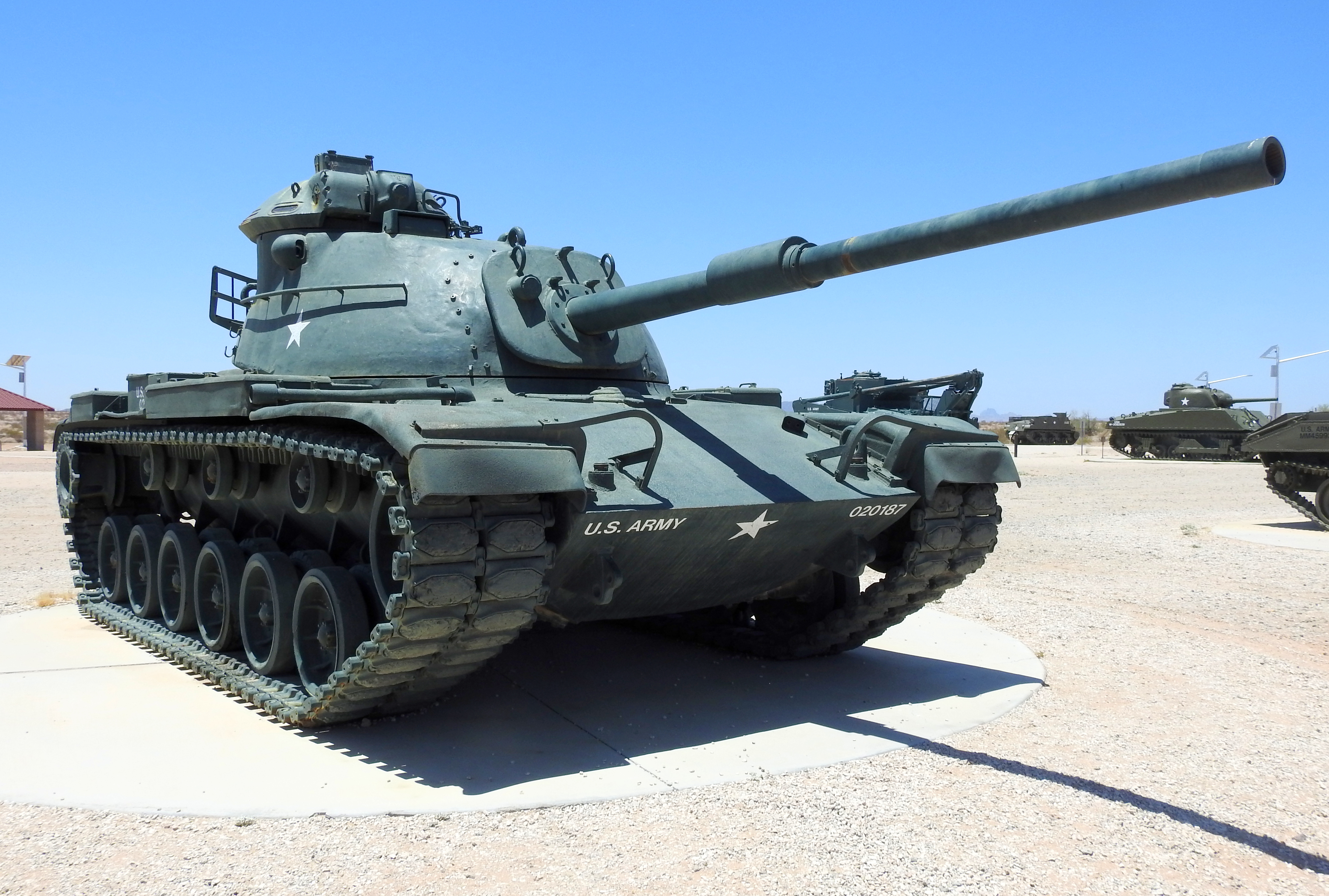
M60 Tank

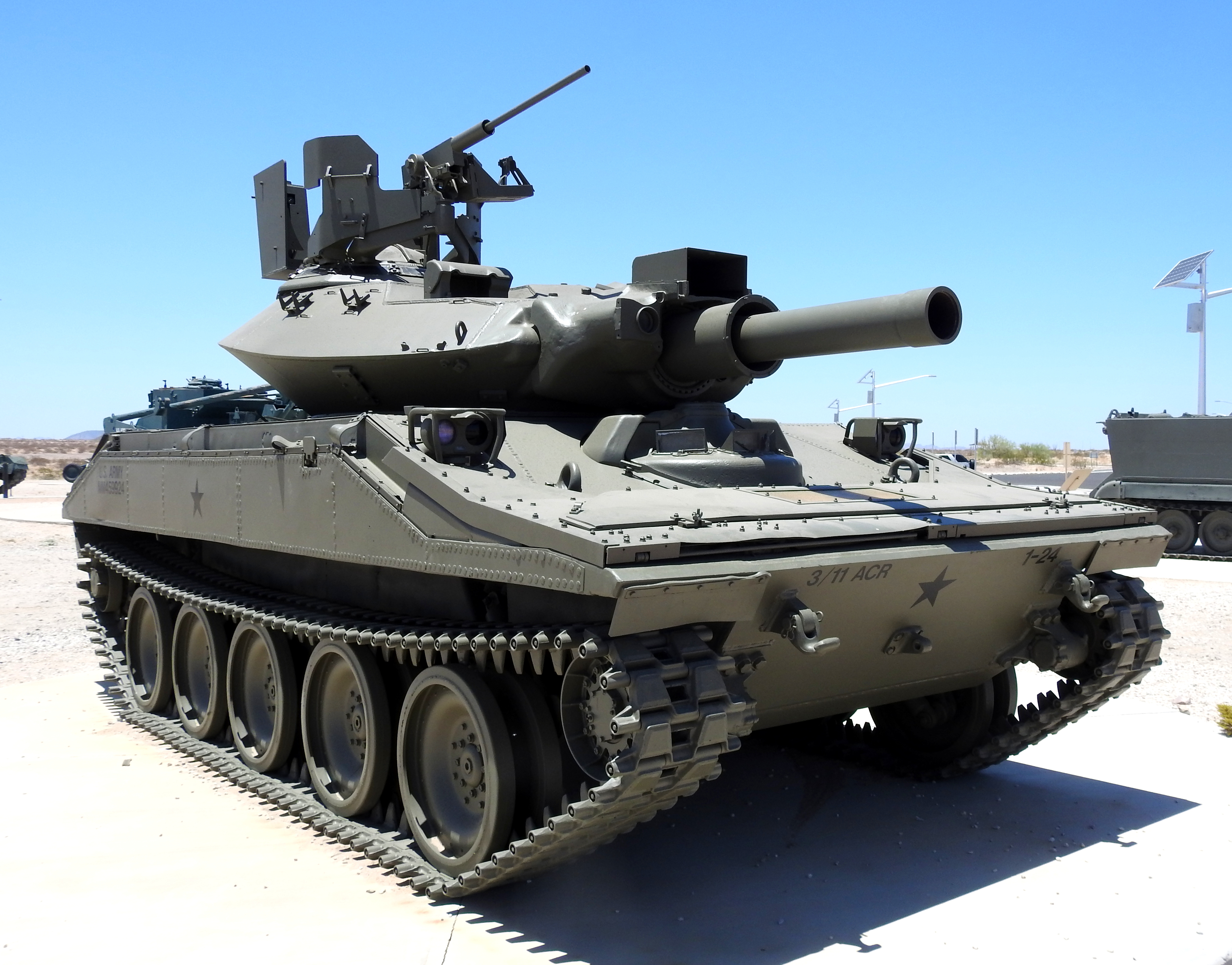
M551 Light Tank "Armored Reconnaissance/Airborne Assault Vehicle" (AR/AAV)

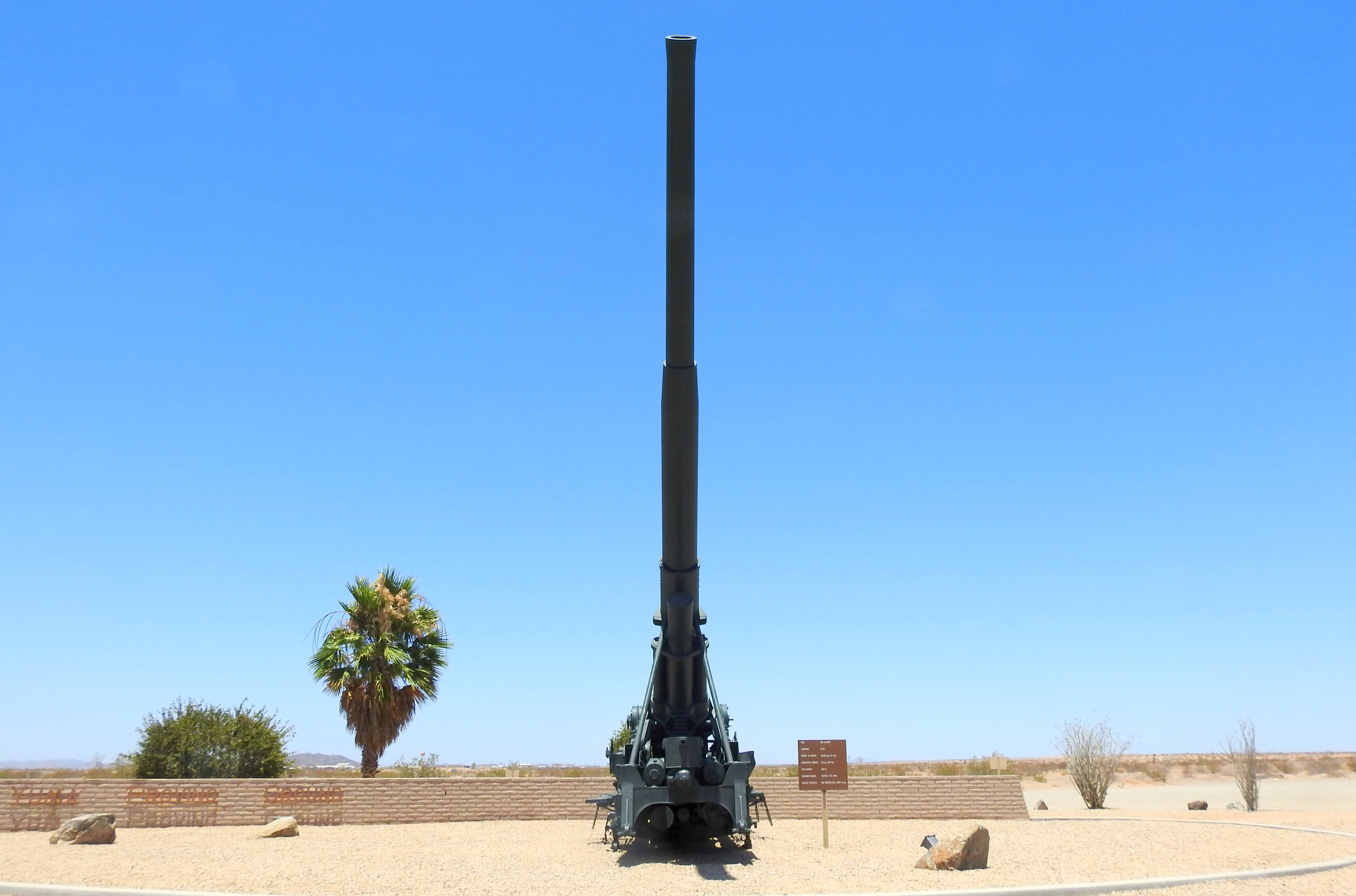
M65 280mm "Atomic Cannon", aka "Atomic Annie".

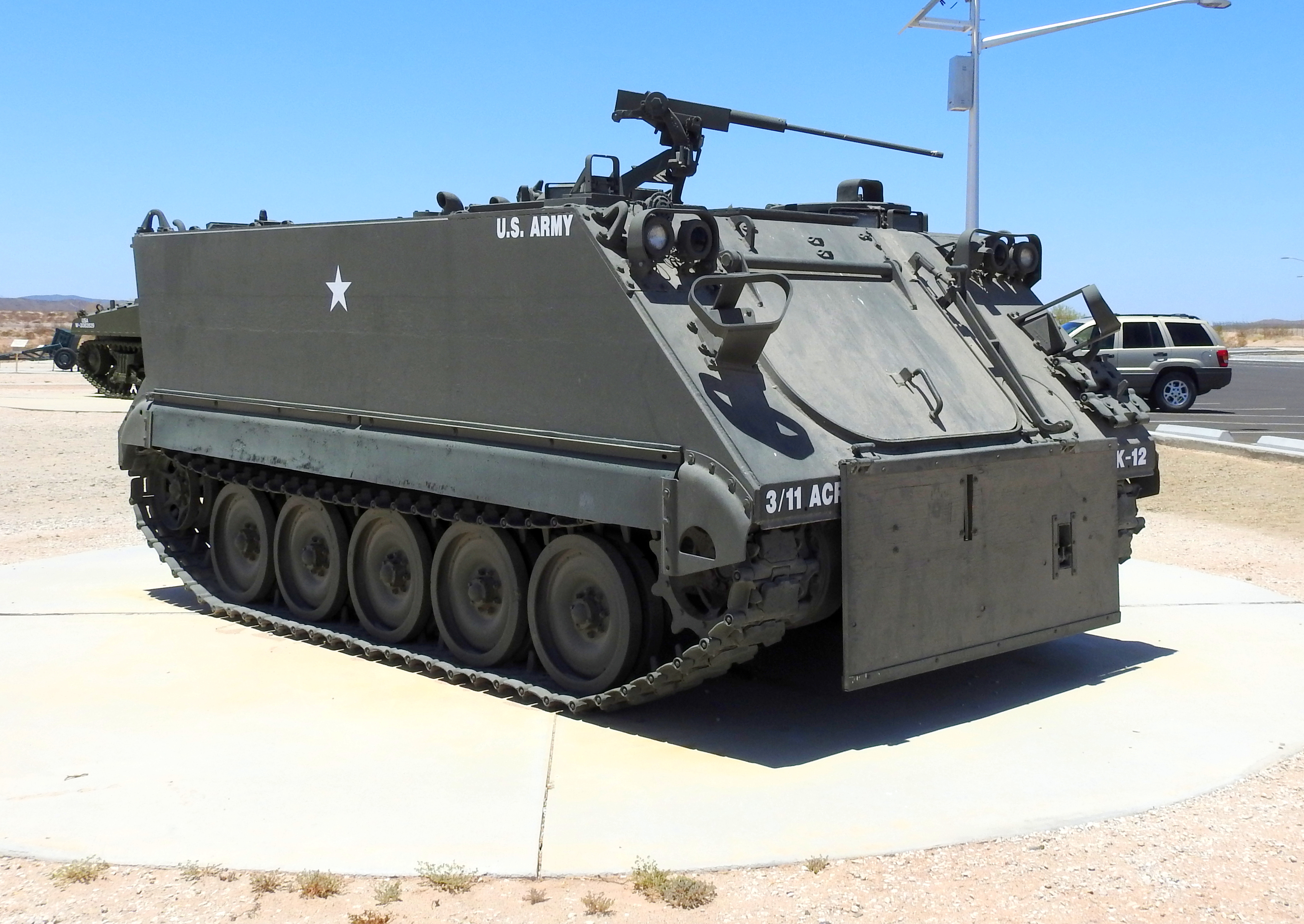
M113A2 Armored Personnel Carrier (APC)

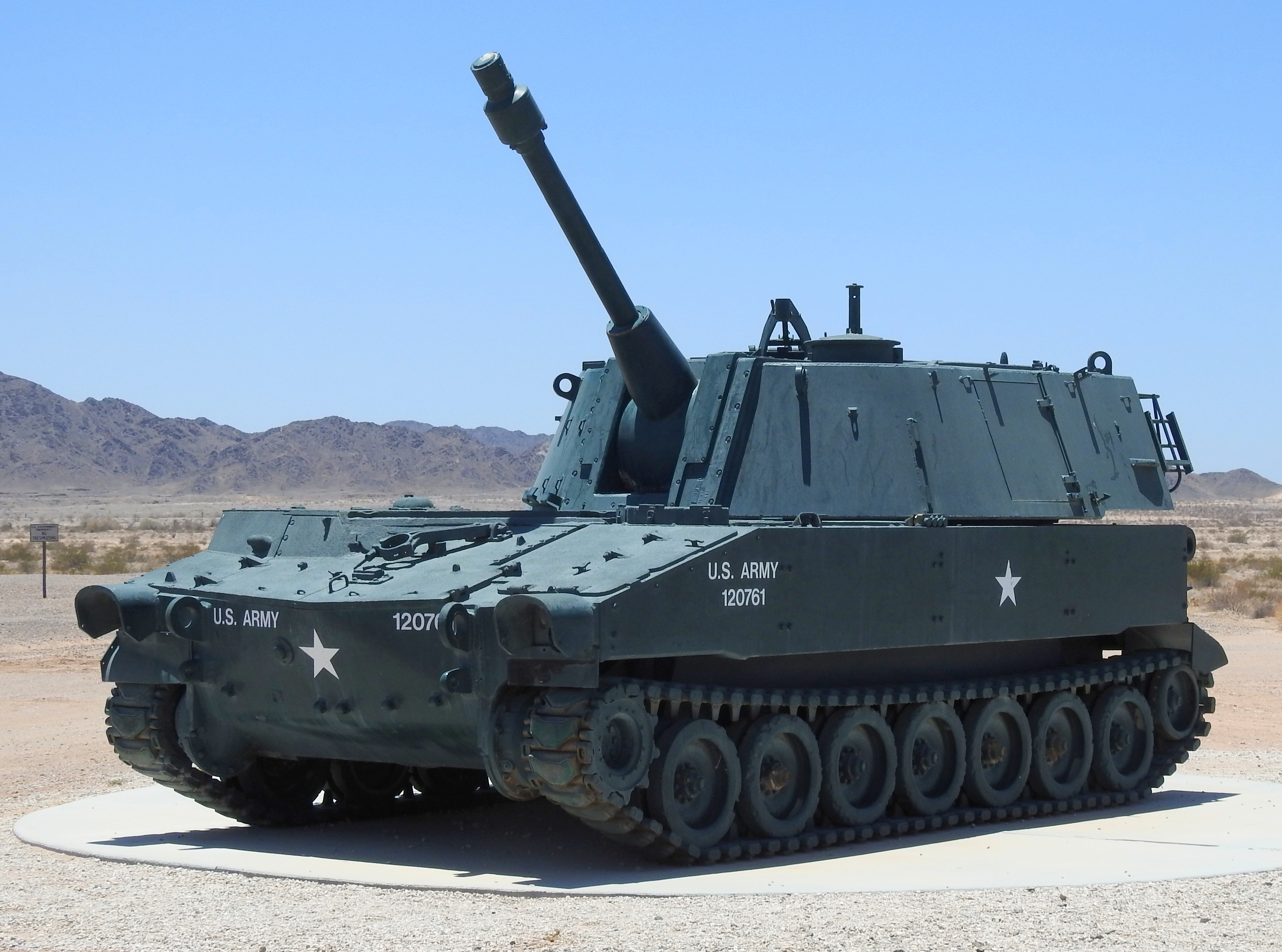
M108 105mm Self Propelled Howitzer

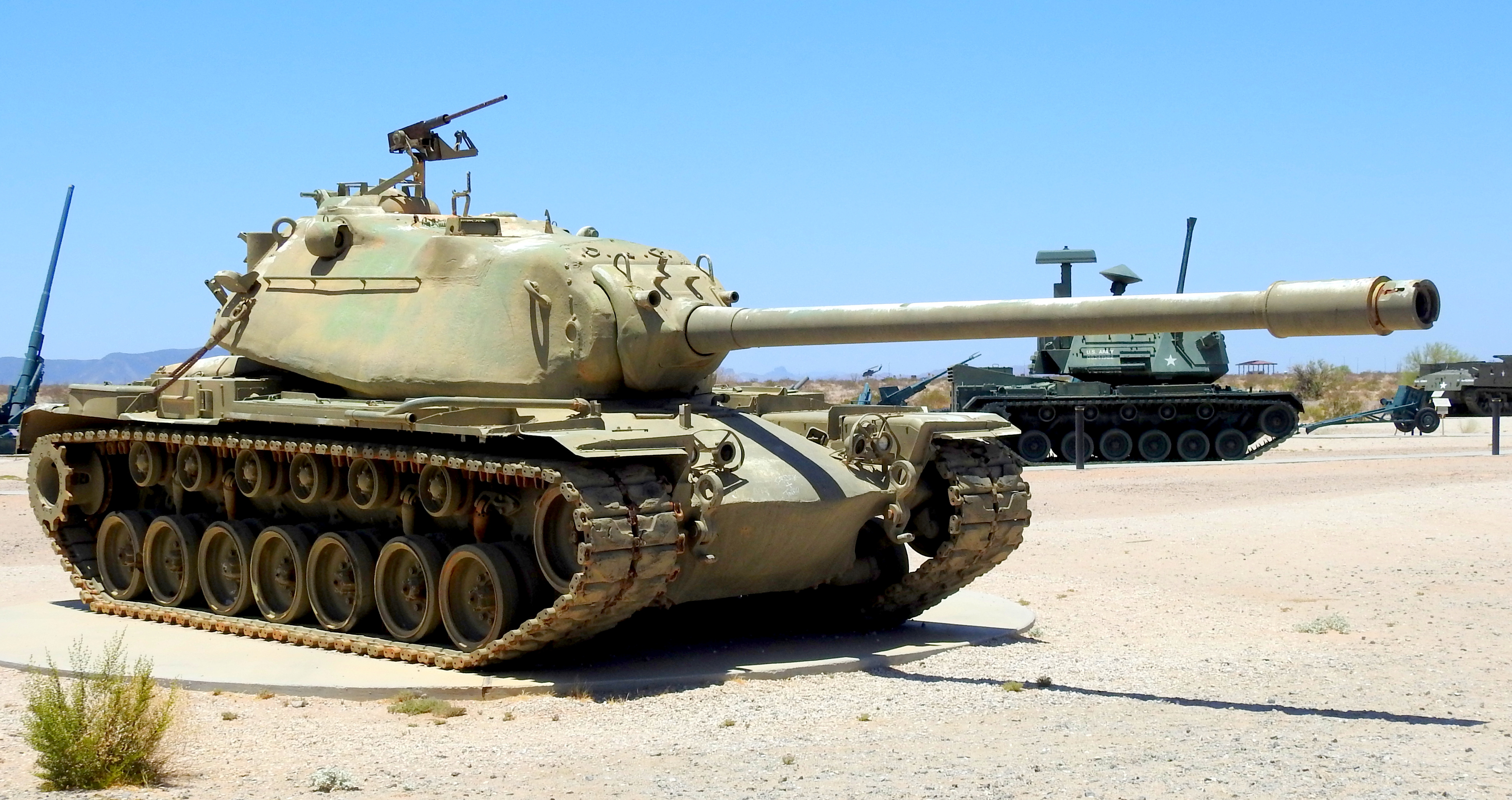
M103 120mm Gun Heavy Tank

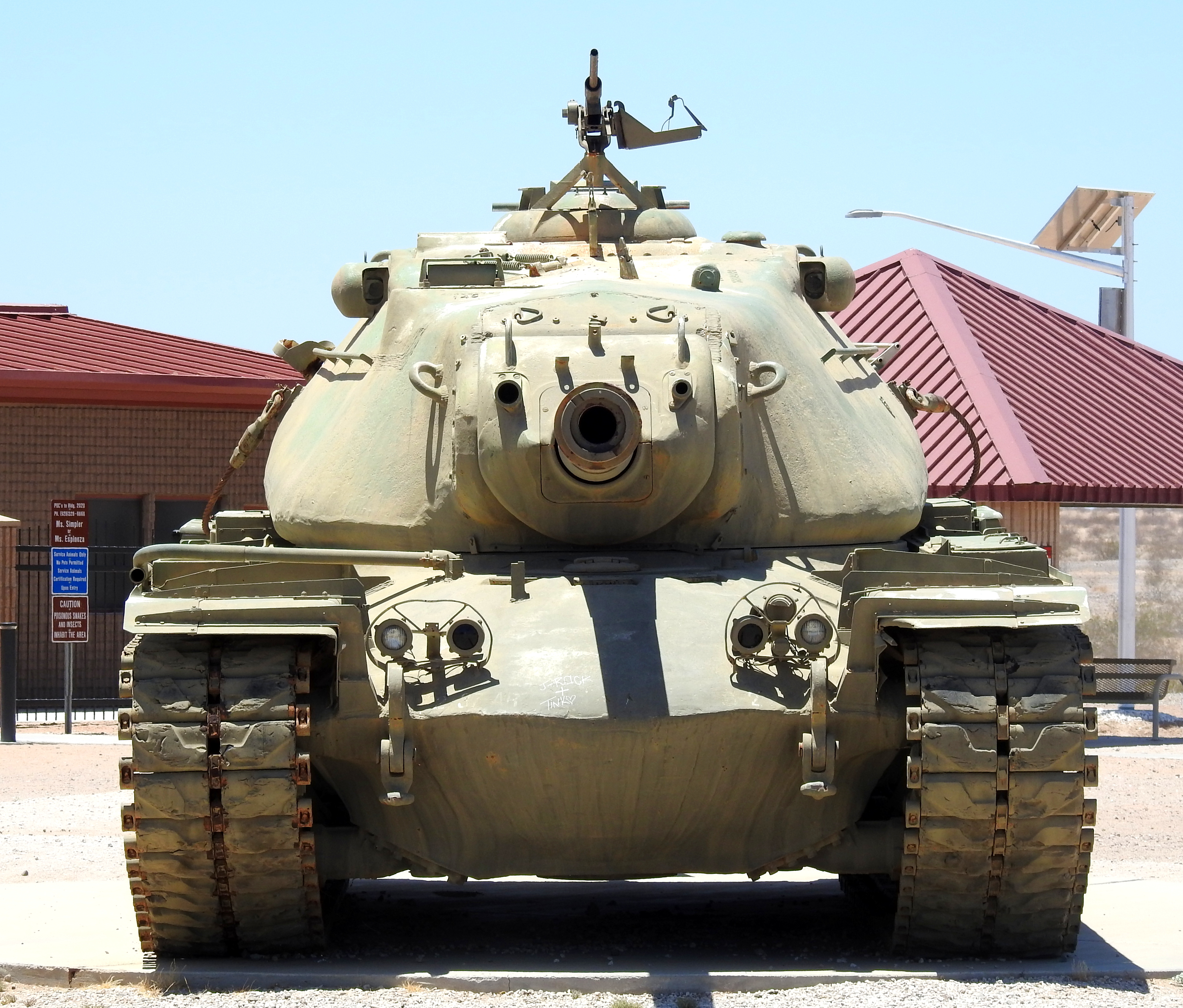
M103 120mm Gun Heavy Tank

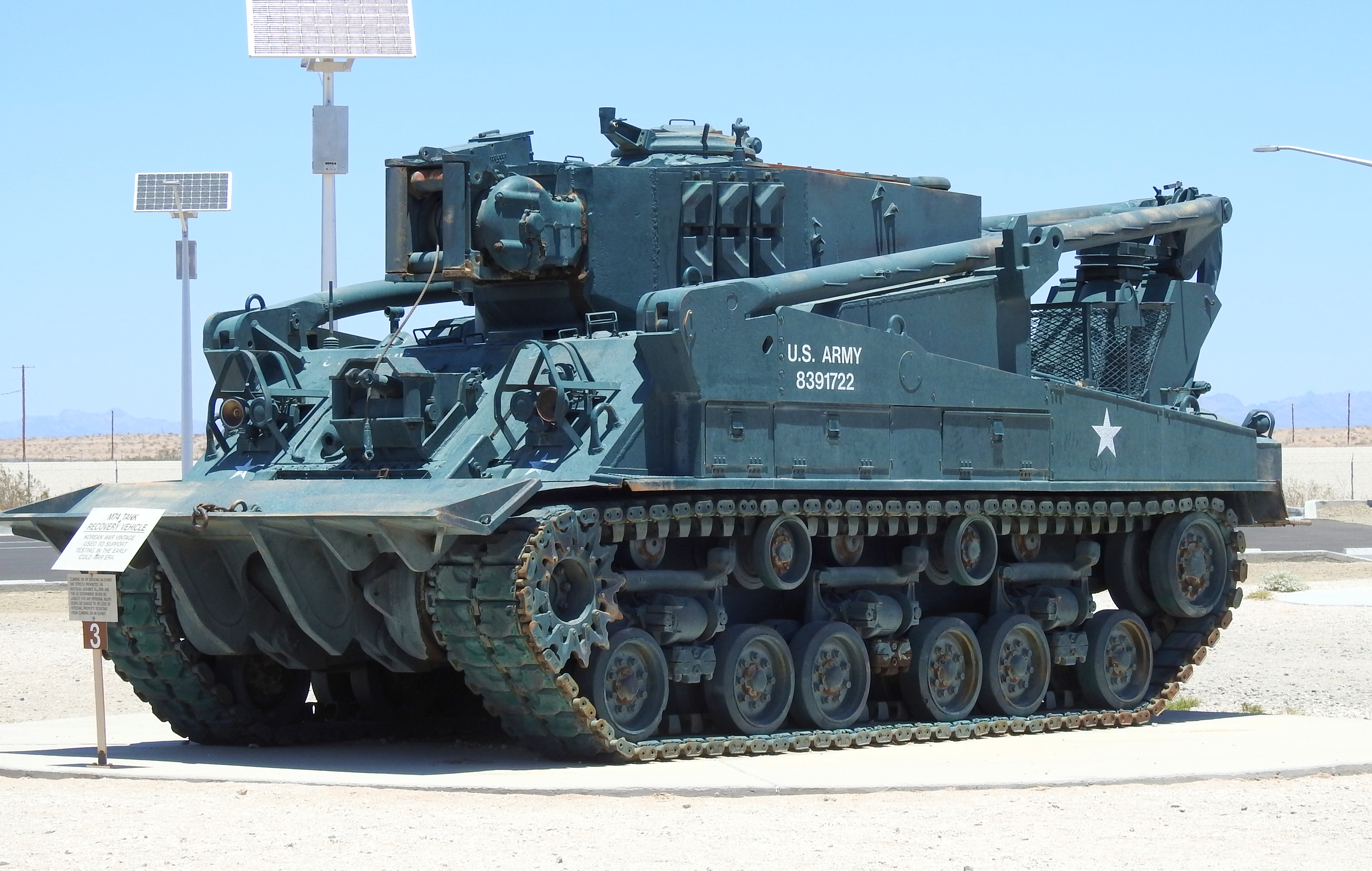
M74 Tank Recovery Vehicle

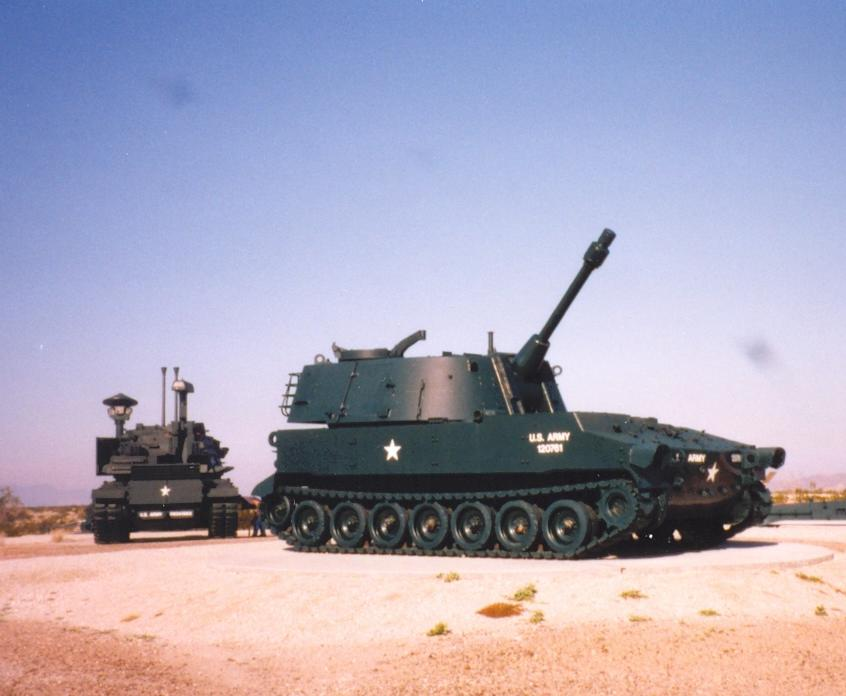
M108 Tank and M247 tank

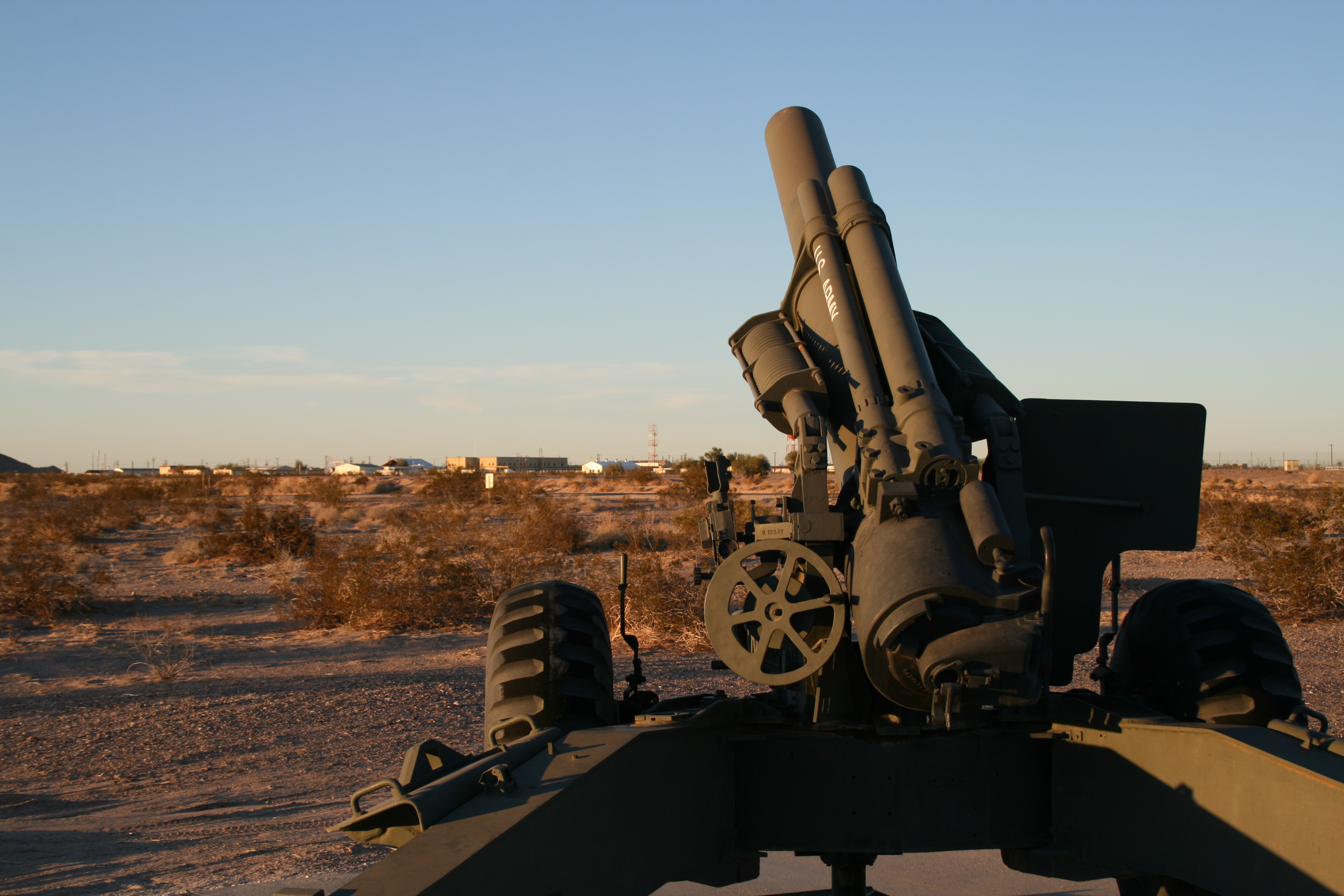
Wahner E. Brooks Historical Exhibit

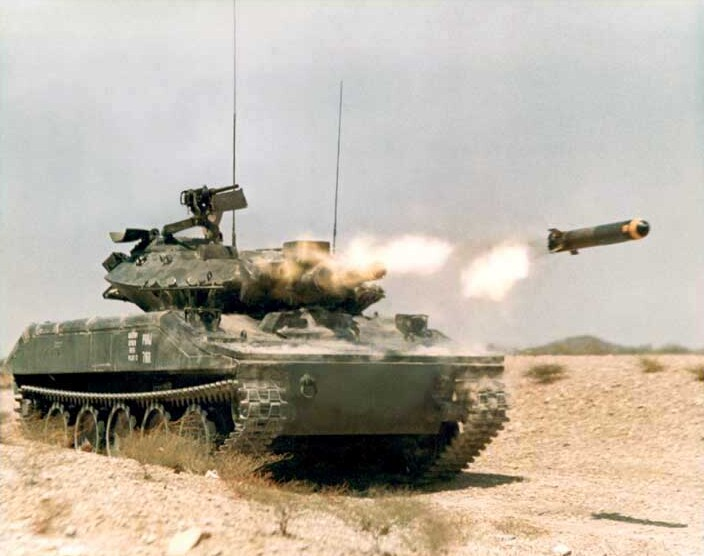
MGM-51 Shillelagh Anti-tank missile fired from M551 Sheridan light tank

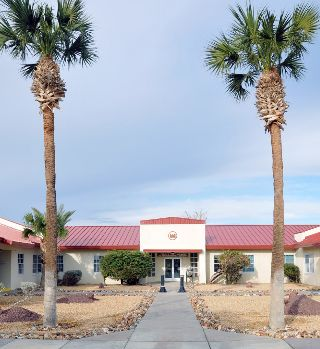
Yuma Proving Ground Heritage Center, Army Museum

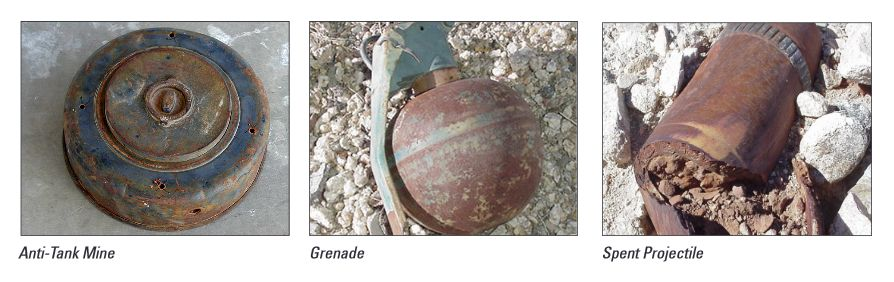
US Army live fire exercises remains at Desert Training Center

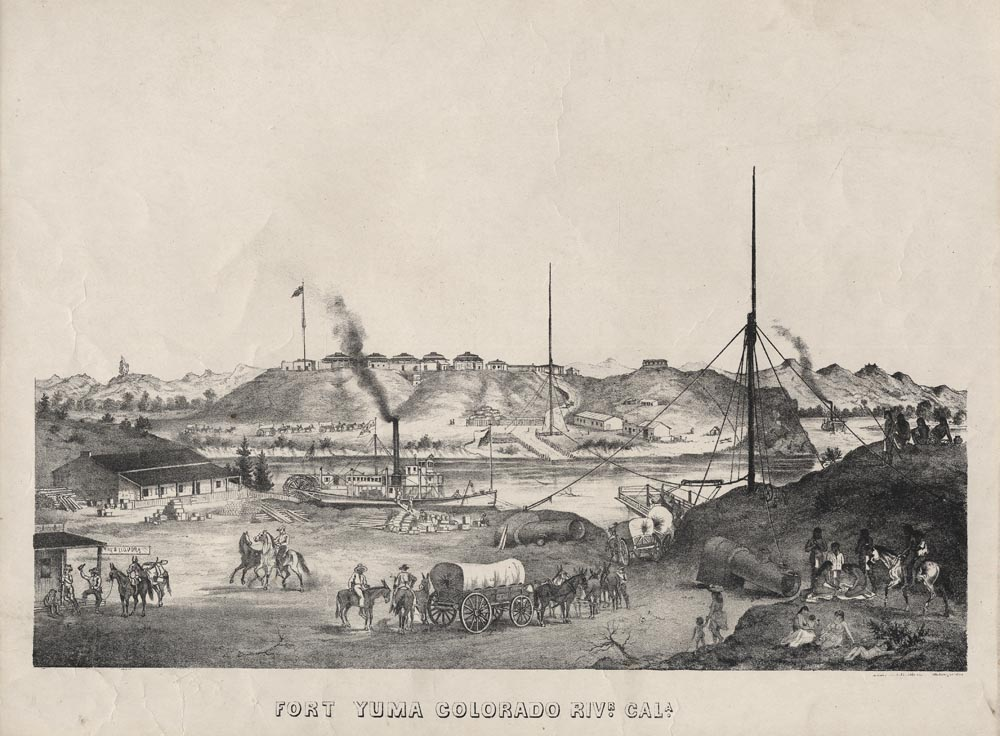
Fort Yuma in 1875
