= Redonda (disambiguation) =

Redonda (Spanish and Portuguese for "rotund" or "round") is an uninhabited island in the Caribbean.

Redonda may also refer to:

- Redonda Rock in the Galapagos Islands, Ecuador
- Kingdom of Redonda, a micronation of the island Redonda
- Redonda (genus), a butterfly genus
- Volta Redonda FC, a Brazilian association football

club

- Redonda FC, an Angolan association football club that play in the Girabola.

== See also ==
- Co-cathedral of Santa María de la Redonda, Spain
- Redondo (disambiguation)
- Whole note, musical term represented by the word "redonda" in Spanish
