= Yuma Elementary School District =

School district in Arizona, United States

Yuma Elementary School District One

Location
- Yuma, Arizona United States

District information
- Type: Public
- Grades: K–8
- Schools: Elementary: 12; Junior high: 3 Middle: 2

Other information
- Website: www.yuma.org

Yuma Elementary School District 1 is a school district in Yuma County, Arizona.

The school district includes the central and eastern portions of Yuma, as well as the surrounding communities of Buckshot, El Prado Estates, Martinez Lake, and the Yuma Proving Ground, as well as most of the Fortuna Foothills CDP. It also serves Dome Valley and Laguna.

Liberty Military Housing of Marine Corps Air Station Yuma is assigned to schools in Yuma ESD.
