= Castle of Redondo =

Medieval castle in Évora, Portugal

- Castelo de Redondo
- Évora, Douro, Norte Region, Portugal in Portugal
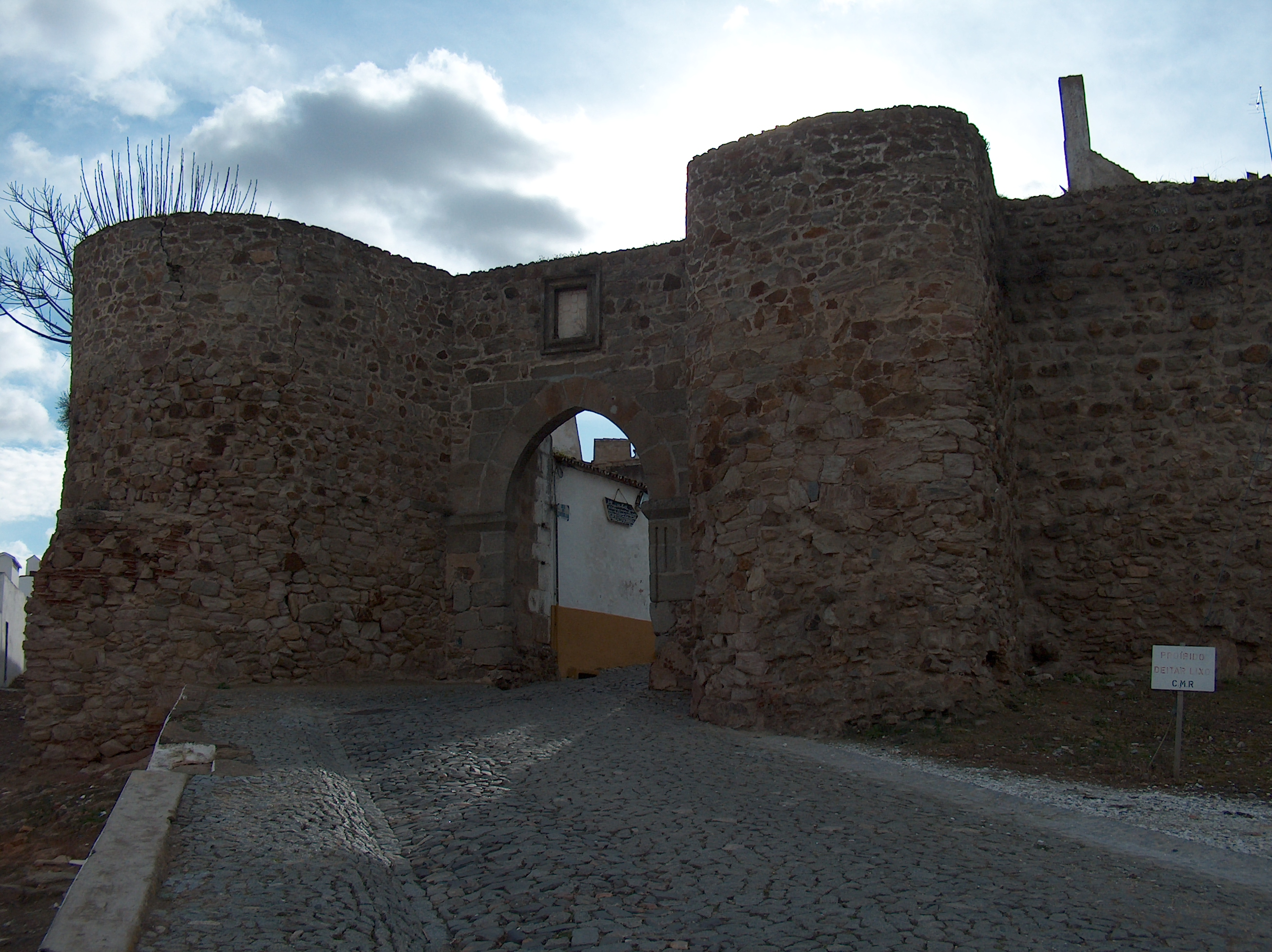
- One of the remaining gates that integrate into the urban centre of the historic city of Redondo

Site information
- Type: Castle
- Owner: Portuguese Republic
- Operator: Câmara Municipal de Redondo (south), terminated 26 September 1941; Santa Casa da Misericórdia (north), terminated 26 September 1941
- Open to the public: Public

Location
- Coordinates: 38°38′59″N 7°32′36″W

Site history
- Materials: Masonry stone, Schist, Granite, Limestone, Wood, Marble

The Castle of Redondo (Portuguese: Castelo de Redondo) is a medieval castle located in the civil parish of Redondo, in the municipality of Redondo, Portuguese Évora.

== History ==
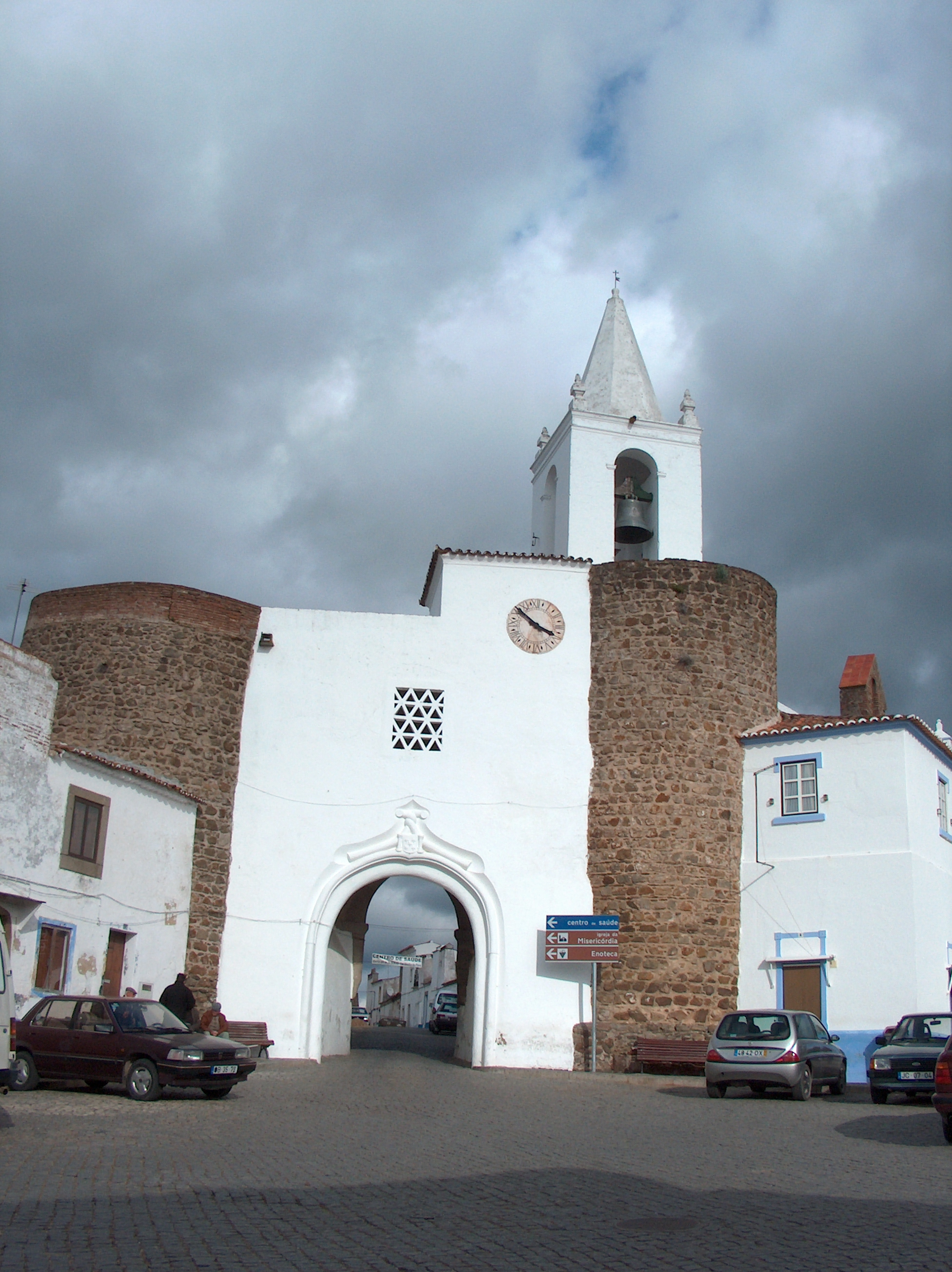
Main gate with flanked towers and clocktower

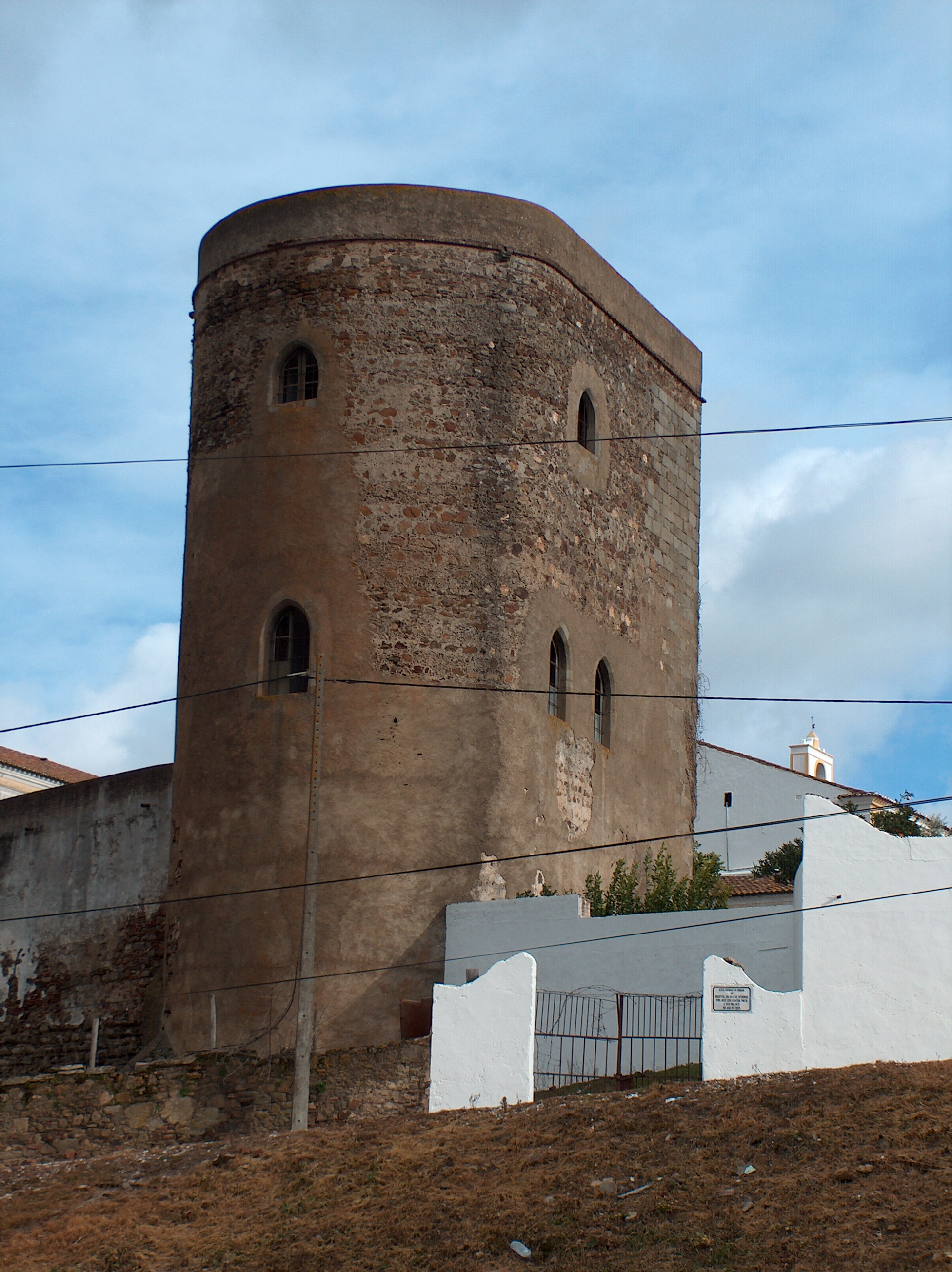
The tower keep of the castle of Redondo

In 1250, a foral (charter) attributed to King D. Afonso III was issued to Redondo. At the same time, the king ordered the construction of a castle over the ruins of the ancient Roman fortress.

The castle was part of the northern Alentejo fortifications restructured by King D. Dinis that were donated to members of the nobility during the late medieval epoch, representing significant alterations during the Manueline era. By order of King D. Dinis, in 1312, the castle was reconstructed, during the same epoch as the erection of the keep tower and the fortification wall and towers. On 27 April 1318, the foral was reconfirmed by King D. Dinis.

In 1418, King D. John conceded privileges to the castle and obligated that travellers between Alandroal and Vila Viçosa pass through the settlement, as a way of expanding commercial activities in the town.

Between the 15th and 16th century, the Torre da Alcaidaria (Alcalde Tower) lost most of its importance, while the residence of Redondo petitioned the king to construct a new tower. By the end of the 15th century, the construction of the keep tower was completed, and the structure became part of the donation of Vasco Coutinho, by King D. Manuel I.

On 2 June 1500, Vasco Coutinho was nominated as captain of Arzila, as the first Count of Redondo.

A new foral was signed by King D. Manuel I on 20 October 1516.

Sometime in the 18th century, there were reports of vestiges of the palace of the Counts of Redondo in the periphery of the keep tower.

The DGEMN Direcção Geral dos Edifícios e Monumentos Nacionais (General-Directorate for Buildings and National Monuments) began restoration work on the keep tower in 1920. Between 1940 and 1950, the keep tower was used as a support building for the hospital of the Santa Casa da Misericórdia. During this period, it functioned as an isolation centre for patients infected with tuberculosis. Around 1961, the fortification walls around the parochial residence were in danger of collapse.

Further work on repairing the castle structures continued from the 20th century on, with the repair of the walls in 1943, and conservation and consolidation projects to shore-up the structure between 23 and 27 April 1962, including the restoration of the Portas da Ravessa (Gates of Ravessa). Similar projects advanced in 1976 and 1986, including repairs to towers, which were supplemented by efforts of the municipal council of Redondo, that included the repairs of wooden doors and windows of the keep tower and reinforcement of the joints of the Ravessa gate.

== Architecture ==
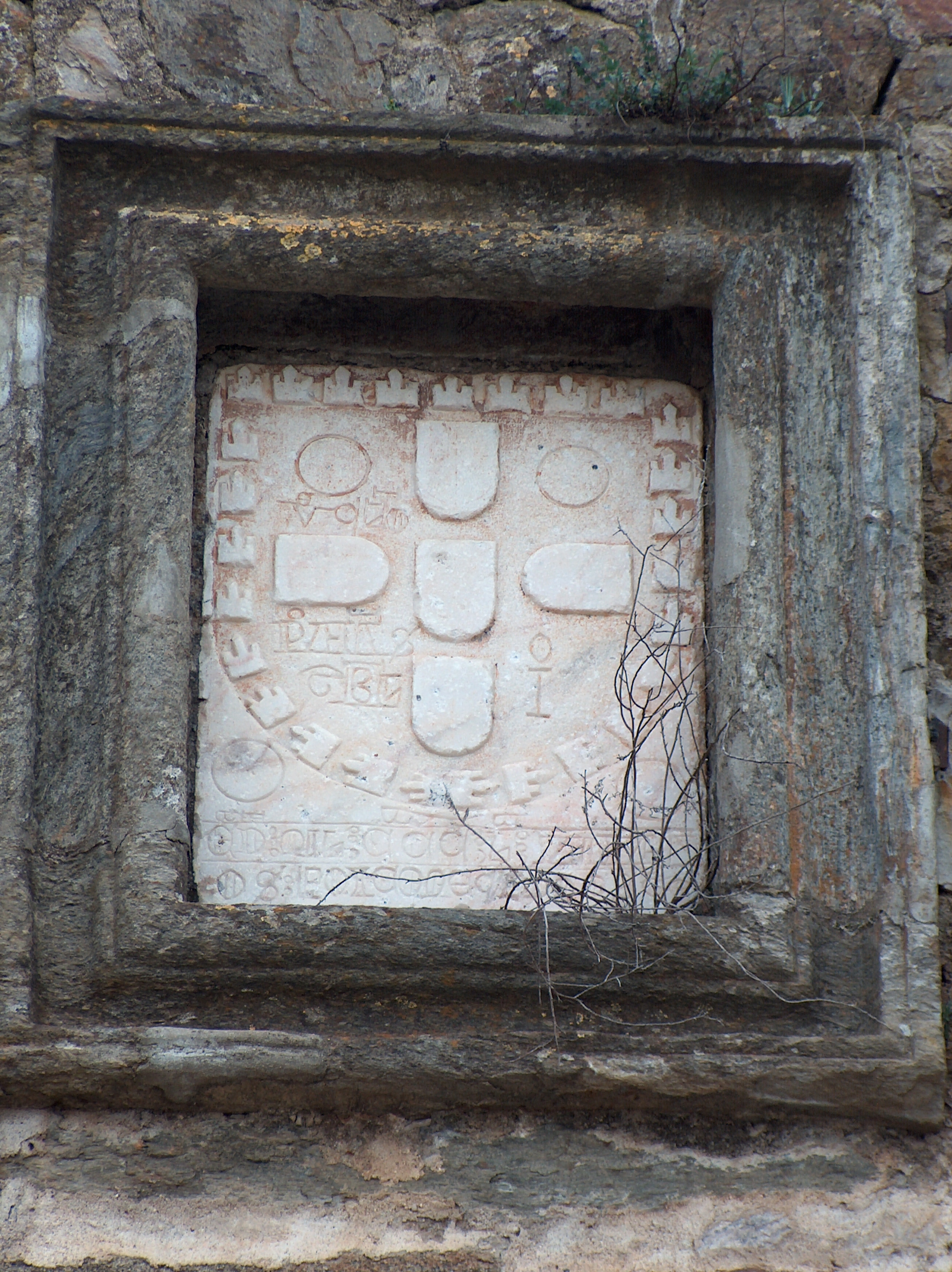
The marble coat-of-arms situated at the main gate

The castle is situated in an urban location, on the southern flank of the Serra d'Ossa, 24 kilometres (15 mi) southwest of the right margin of the Guadiana River. It is located in the town of Redondo, on a hilltop 300 metres (980 ft) above sea level, with a portion of the town's residential dwellings within its walls, as well as along the cliffs. From the top of the keep tower it is possible to see the Castle of Evoramonte and portions of the Serra d'Ossa, in the northwest.

Within the walls the buildings are typical Alentejano architecture, with large rectangular chimneys, single-storey dwellings, white-washed with highlights in ochre and blue. Within the walls and near the keep tower is the Hospital of Santa Casa da Misericórdia do Redondo and, to the west, the parochial church of Nossa Senhora da Anunciação. The castle is situated along an Évora defensive line during the medieval period along with the castles of Estremoz, Monsaraz and Portel.

Over the Ravessa Gate is an inscription surmounted by the royal coat-of-arms:

E(RA) DE | MIL CCCL | VII AN / OS | FOI COMECADO | ESTE / CASTELO
It was in | 1350 | 7 years | was started | this / castle

In the three spaces between the shields is the inscription:

V CLO | P FASTEL | I

To the right of the staircase of the keep tower is a tombstone with the inscription:

A HISTORIA DESTE CASTELO | FOI RECORDADA COM | GRATIDÃO PELOS | PORTUGUESES DE 1940
The history of this castle | was recorded with | gratitude by the | Portuguese of 1940
