= Fernando Redondo (disambiguation) =

Fernando Redondo (born 1969) is an Argentina international football defensive midfielder.

Fernando Redondo may also refer to:

- Fernando Redondo (canoeist) (born 1978), Argentine canoeist
- Fernando Redondo (footballer, born 1994), Argentine football midfielder, and son of footballer born 1969
