= Redondo Beach (disambiguation) =

Redondo Beach may refer to:

- Redondo Beach, California
  - Redondo Beach station
- Redondo, Des Moines, Washington, a small board-walk beach
- "Redondo Beach" (song), by Patti Smith and covered by Morrissey

== See also ==
- Redonda Beach, a similarly named place in Portugal
