= Vicente Romero Redondo =

Spanish figurative painter and educator (born 1956)

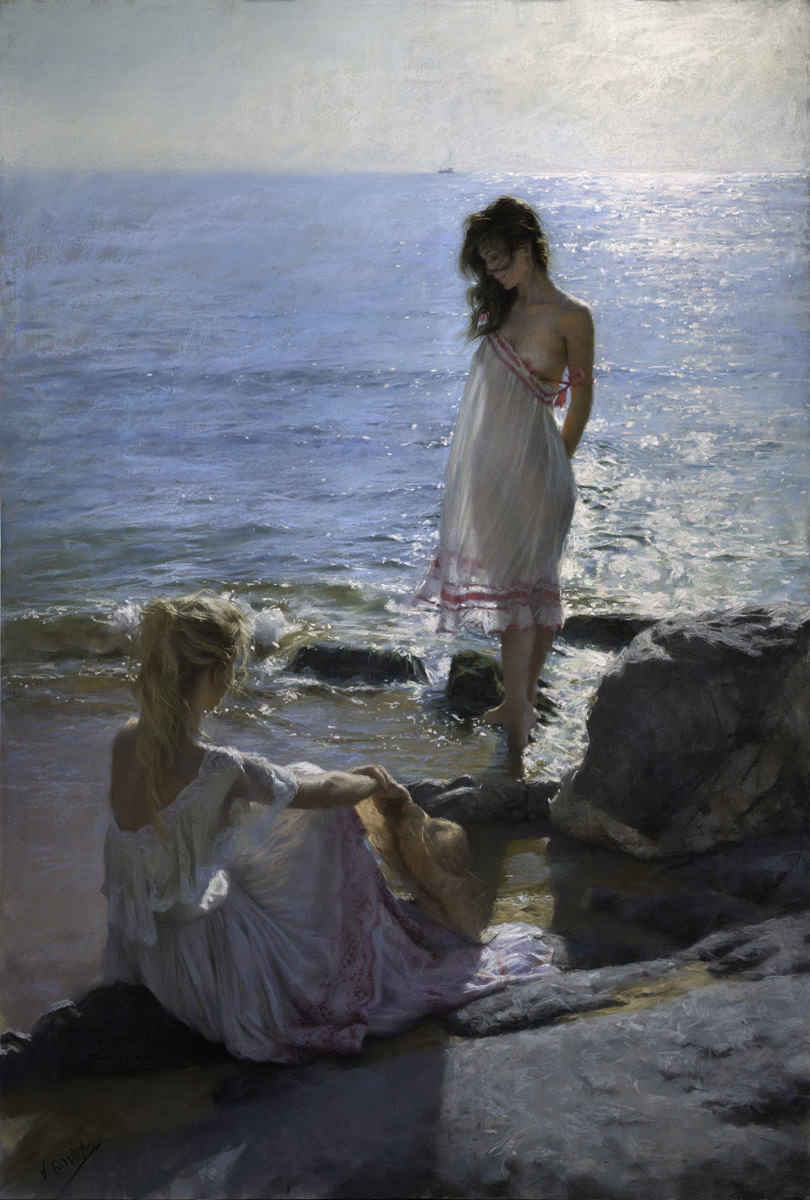
Pastel painting by Vicente Romero Redondo

Vicente Romero Redondo (born 1956) is a Spanish figurative painter and educator, best known for his pastel depictions of graceful girls at solitary moments in romantic surroundings, adorned in crafty clothing. Having resided on the Costa Brava for years, his oeuvre has been praised for conveying rare beauty and serenity, while taking after the vivid luminosity distinctively seen in the art of native mediterranean masters. Romero Redondo's oeuvre has been exhibited with honors across borders in Europe and beyond.

== Life and career ==
Born in Madrid and raised in an art-loving family, Romero Redondo took an early interest in drawing and sketching at school. At 19 he enrolled at San Fernando Faculty of Fine Arts in Madrid where he graduated as a "Licenciado" in sculpture in 1982.

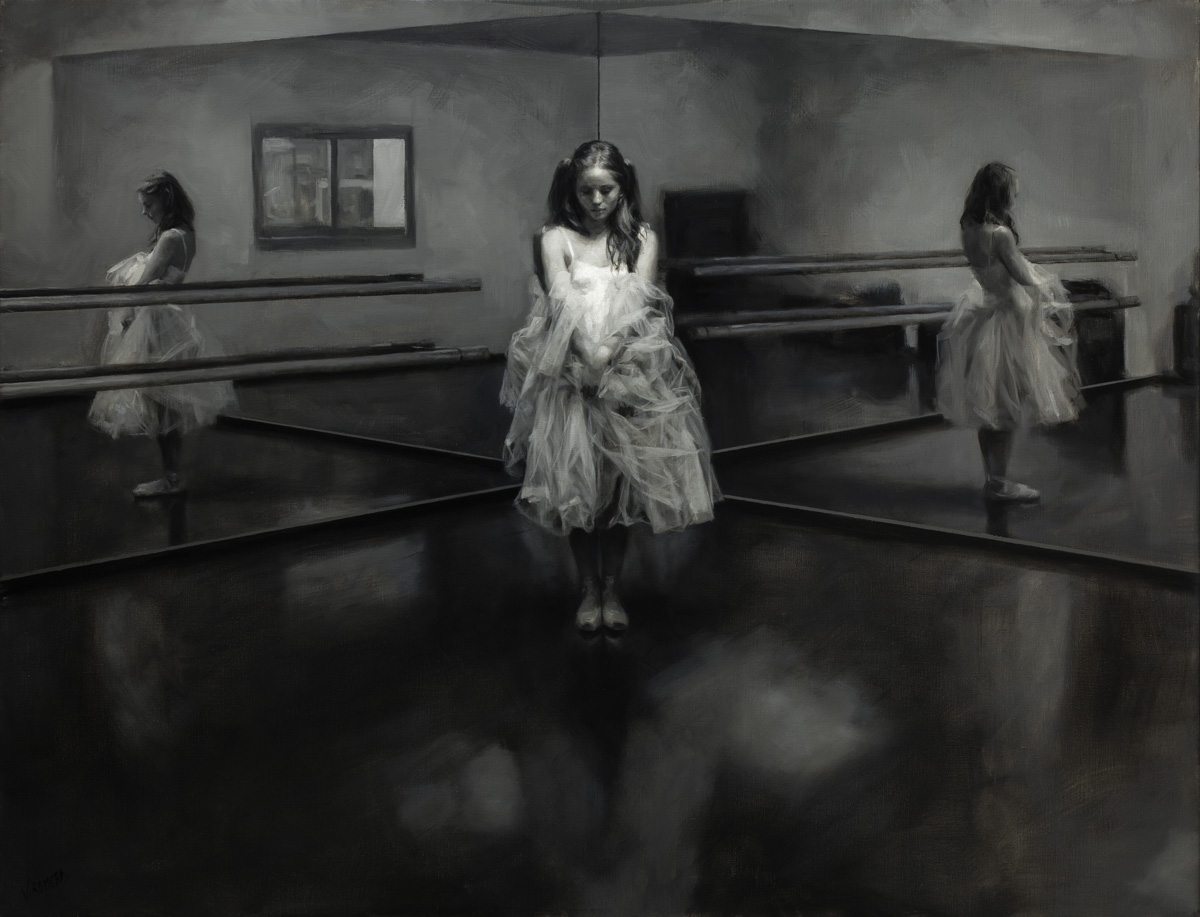
2014, Pastel by Vicente Romero Redondo, 116x89 cm

For several years he worked as a nomad street portraitist along coastal locations on the Spanish peninsula and islands while self-learning and further developing his plastic expression skills, until finally adopting pastel as his most favoured medium. Romero Redondo settled on Calonge, Costa Brava in 1987 where his art matured to his present luminous mediterranean style.

Regarded as a pastelist master, Romero Redondo has been recently distinguished as a special guest at international pastel events in France, Turkey and Philippines. Besides Spain, his work has also been exhibited in many other countries including Italy, Russia, the US, Taiwan and China, among others.

A retrospective of the artist's artwork was published in "Pratique des Arts" in 2015, and is available from the Bibliothèques de la Ville de Paris. Vicpastel, the official newsletter of the Pastel Society of Victoria, Australia (Feb 2014) devoted his cover to a piece by Romero Redondo, referring to him as a "superb Spanish painter of beauty and light".

Romero Redondo has been an active educator, dictating art workshops in many cities worldwide.

The artist has acknowledged that his paintings attempt to provide "an illusion of surprise, a stolen moment of intimacy".

== Exhibitions ==
- 2002 Castelló 120, Madrid.
- 2003 Pizarro, Valencia.
- 2005 Echeberría, San Sebastián.
- 2005 Fons d’Art, Olot.
- 2006 Benedito, Málaga.
- 2008 Benedito, Málaga.
- 2008 Petley's, London.
- 2009 Foz, Sitges.
- 2009 Castell de Benedormiens, Platja d’Aro (retrospective).
- 2009 Benedito, Málaga.
- 2010 Petley's, London.
- 2011 Pizarro, Valencia.
- 2012 Benedito, Málaga.
- 2012 Festivales Internationales du pastel à Saint-Florent-le-Vieil. Guest of honor.
- 2012 Salon International du pastel en Périgord. Guest of honor.
- 2014 Benedito, Málaga.
- 2015 Ming Gallery, Suzhou, China.
- 2016 A. C. Art Museum Hotel, Beijing, China.
