= Redondo Reservoir =

Waterbody in Yuma County, Arizona

- Location within Arizona
- Location: Arizona
- Coordinates: 32°44′6″N 114°40′0″W
- Type: reservoir
- Basin countries: United States
- Surface area: 4 acres (1.6 ha)
- Average depth: 5 ft (1.5 m)
- Surface elevation: 190 ft (58 m)
- Settlements: Tucson

Redondo Reservoir is located 12 miles (19 km) north of Yuma in the state of Arizona.

== Fish species ==
- Largemouth Bass
- Catfish (Channel)
- Redear Sunfish
- Bluegill Sunfish
- Bullfrogs
