= Weather beacon =

Beacon that indicates local weather forecast

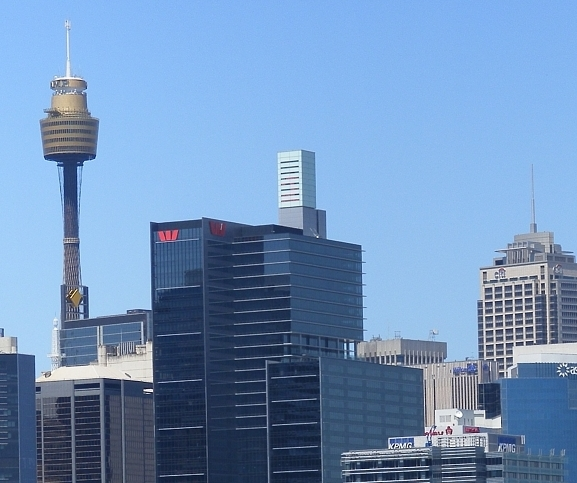
Weather beacon barometer atop the Westpac Place building in Sydney

A weather beacon is a beacon that indicates the local weather forecast in a code of colored or flashing lights. Often, a short poem or jingle accompanies the code to make it easier to remember.

The beacon is usually on the roof of a tall building in a central business district, but some are attached to towers. The beacons are most commonly owned by financial services companies and television stations and are part of advertising and public relations programs. They provide a very basic forecast for the general public and not as an aid to navigation.

In addition to displaying weather forecasts, some weather beacons have been used to signal victory or defeat for a professional sports home team.

== History ==
=== Precursors ===
In 1898 on the orders of U.S. president William McKinley, coastal warning display towers were installed along the coast of the United States. In 1936, the Weather Girl sculptures were installed in City Hall Square in Copenhagen. In 1938, Douglas Leigh designed a Coca-Cola billboard with a weather forecast display at Columbus Circle in New York City.

=== Weather beacons ===
The first attempt to create a weather beacon as a form of advertising was from Douglas Leigh, who, in 1941, arranged a lighting scheme for the Empire State Building to display a weather forecast code with a decoder to be packaged with Coca-Cola bottles. The plan was never implemented because of the attack on Pearl Harbor later that year. Leigh resurrected his idea in Minneapolis in October 1949 with the Northwestern National Bank Weatherball.

In Australia, MLC installed weather beacons atop its buildings in North Sydney and Melbourne 1957 and 1958.

Weather beacons were most popular during the 1950s and 1960s.

== Similar devices ==
- Coastal warning display tower
- Harbinger at The Met Condos, Toronto, is a colored beacon on the roof that indicates the current wind speed.
- Hibernia Bank Building (New Orleans)
- Paris balloon
- Signal station
- Time ball

== List of weather beacons ==
=== Australia ===
- New South Wales
  - St George Co-operative Building Society, Hurstville (16 March 1973 − ????)
  - MLC Building, North Sydney (31 December 1957 − ????)
  - Westpac Place, Sydney
- Queensland
  - Hitachi Building (MLC Building), 239 George Street, Brisbane (1976 – 6pm, 26 November 2007)
  - Old MLC Building, 243 Edward Street, Brisbane (28 July 1958 – ????; non-functioning)
- South Australia
  - MLC Building (now Beacon House), Victoria Square, Adelaide (June 1958 – December 1979)
- Victoria
  - Carlton & United Brewery, Abbotsford (May 1958 − ????)
  - IOOF Building (formerly MLC), 303 Collins Street, Melbourne (1973 – ????; non-functioning)
  - 888 Collins Street, Melbourne (2016 − present)
- Western Australia
  - MLC Building (now Kingsgate Apartments), 171 St Georges Terrace, Perth (October 1957 – ????; dismantled)

=== Austria ===
- Wetterleuchtturm, Ringturm, Vienna

=== Belgium ===
- Who's afraid of Red, Green and Blue: Weather Tower, Dexia Tower, Brussels (22 October 2007 – 22 December 2007)

=== Canada ===
- Capilano Brewery, 1550 Burrard Street, Vancouver, British Columbia (1953 − ????)
- White Rose weather beacon, 570 Portage Avenue, Winnipeg, Manitoba (25 June 1964 − ????)
- Kitchener City Hall, Kitchener, Ontario
- Canada Life Building, Toronto, Ontario (9 August 1951 – present)
- Canada Life, 505 Boulevard René-Lévesque Ouest, Montreal, Quebec (12 April 1956 – January 1976)
- The Plains Hotel, Regina, Saskatchewan (???? − 2011)

=== Denmark ===
- vejrpigen (Weather Girl), Richshuset, The City Hall Square, Copenhagen (1936 − present)
- Tomorrow's Weather, Aller Media, Havneholmen, Copenhagen (2009 − present)

=== Finland ===
- Näsinneula tower, Tampere

=== Germany ===
- Wettersäule Aachen

=== Japan ===
- Tempozan Ferris Wheel, Osaka
- Tsūtenkaku, Osaka

=== Norway ===
- Tomorrow's Weather, Valle Hovin, Oslo

=== Sweden ===
- Tomorrow's Weather, Stockholm Central Station, Stockholm

=== Turkey ===
- Beyazıt Tower, Istanbul

=== United Kingdom ===
- Light Towers Project (Coventry Point, Mercia House, Hillman House), Coventry
- Castlemilk Lighting Project, Castlemilk, Glasgow
- Empire Square Tower, Southwark, London

=== United States ===
- Arizona
  - St. Luke's Medical Center, Phoenix (1960 − February 1969 on The Arizona Bank; March 1969 − ????; dismantled)
- California
  - Mattei Building (formerly Guarantee Savings), Fresno (1965 – 1994)
  - ABC10 Weather Tower, KXTV, Sacramento (24 August 2001 – 2014; non-functioning)
  - One Rincon Hill South Tower, San Francisco (8 December 2008 – present)
- Colorado
  - National Farmers Union, 1575 Sherman Street, Denver (1956 − 1970; dismantled)
- Florida
  - Mercantile National Bank, 420 Lincoln Road, Miami Beach (23 February 1957 − ????; dismantled)
  - American Federal Savings and Loan Association weather ball, Fidelity Storage building, 53 W. Jackson St., Orlando (1963 – 1974; dismantled)
  - First Federal Savings & Loan, Fourth Street and Central Avenue, St. Petersburg (1953 – 6 April 1970; dismantled)
- Illinois
  - Weather Bell, Bell Federal Savings (now Walgreens), 79 West Monroe Street, Chicago (???? − present)
    - Bell Federal Savings branch office, 180 N. Michigan Avenue, Chicago (???? − 1996; dismantled)
  - WLS-TV Thermometer, Marina City, Chicago (1964 – 1978; dismantled)
  - WFRL weather beacon, State Bank Center, 50 West Douglas Street, Freeport (1974 − ????; dismantled)
- Indiana
  - Citizens National Bank, Evansville (16 October 1953 − ????; dismantled)
- Iowa
  - KCCI, Des Moines (21 October 1960 − 2 January 1974, 1987 − 27 September 2012; non-functioning)
  - American Trust Tower, Dubuque (1975−)
  - KCAU-TV Weather Ball, Terra Centre, Sioux City (1995–)
  - KVTV/KCAU-TV Weather Ball, Badgerow Building, Sioux City (1961–1973; dismantled)
  - National Bank of Waterloo, 315 East Fifth Street, Waterloo (???? − ????; dismantled)
- Kentucky
  - WLWT Weather Lights, Cincinnati Radisson, Covington
  - Tomorrow's Weather, 21c Museum Hotel, Lexington (2016 − present)
- Louisiana
  - Falstaff Brewery Weather Ball, 2601 Gravier St, New Orleans (1 August 1952 – 7 December 1978; 2008 – present)
- Massachusetts
  - Berkeley Building, Boston (15 March 1950 – present)
- Michigan
  - Citizens Bank (currently Huntington Bank) Weatherball, Flint (30 October 1956 – present)
  - 13 Weatherball, WZZM-TV, Grand Rapids (August 1967 – 1987 as Michigan National Bank; 2003 – present)
- Minnesota
  - KCCO Weatherball, 8th Ave E & Hawthorne St., Alexandria (???? − March 2006)
  - WEBC Weather Beacon, 331 W. Superior Street, Duluth
  - Northwestern National Bank Weatherball, Minneapolis (7 October 1949 – 25 November 1982; dismantled)
    - Nicollet Island/East Bank branch office, 430 East Hennepin Avenue, Minneapolis (dismantled)
    - Riverside branch office, 401 Cedar Avenue, Minneapolis (dismantled)
    - Uptown branch office, 3006 Hennepin Avenue, Minneapolis (dismantled)
    - Hastings branch office, 111 E. 3rd Street, Hastings (dismantled)
    - Mankato branch office, 206 E. Hickory Street, Mankato (dismantled)
    - Montevideo branch office, 109 N. 1st Street, Montevideo (dismantled)
    - Rochester branch office, 15 2nd Street, SW, Rochester (dismantled)
    - Saint Paul branch office, 360 Robert Street N, Saint Paul (dismantled)
    - Sauk Rapids branch office, 24 N. Benton Drive, Sauk Rapids (15 September 1961 − ????; dismantled)
  - WCCO-TV Weather Watcher, Nicollet Mall, Minneapolis (29 November 2013 − present)
  - Moorhead Center Mall, Moorhead (1976 − ????; dismantled)
- Missouri
  - Business Men's Assurance Company (BMA) weather beacon, 215 W. Pershing Road, Kansas City (28 July 1952 – mid-1970s; dismantled)
  - KCTV Tower, Kansas City (1970s − 2001)
  - Terra Cotta Lofts (formerly occupied by the Missouri State Life Insurance Company and later the General American Life Insurance Company), 1501 Locust Street, St. Louis (1956 – 1979; non-functioning)
  - State Bank of Wellston, Wellston (1954 − 16 May 2014; dismantled)
- Montana
  - Midland Bank (now US Bank Tower), 303 N. Broadway, Billings (dismantled)
  - Union Bank (now Wells Fargo) Weatherball, 350 N. Last Chance Gulch, Helena (1959 − ????; dismantled)
- Nebraska
  - KMTV Weather Tower, N. 72nd Street, Omaha (non-functioning)
- New Mexico
  - KOBeacon, KOB, Sandia Crest, Albuquerque (October 1966 − 28 December 1966; non-functioning)
- New York
  - 1740 Broadway (formerly MONY), New York City (non-functioning)
  - AXA Towers (MONY) Weatherstar, Syracuse
- North Dakota
  - KFYR, Provident Life building, Bismarck (1954−)
- Ohio
  - WKRC weather beacon in Cincinnati in 2005
    12 WKRC Weather Beacon, Chiquita Center, Cincinnati (1987 – 2000s?)
  - WKYC Weather Beacon, Cleveland (???? − present)
- Oklahoma
  - Liberty National Bank and Trust, Ramsey Tower/City Place, Oklahoma City (6 April 1958 − ????; dismantled)
  - National Bank of Tulsa Weather Teller, 320 South Boston Building, Tulsa (1 May 1967 − 15 November 1973; dismantled)
- Oregon
  - Standard Insurance Plaza, 1100 SW 6th Avenue, Portland (1964 − present)
  - Weather Machine, Pioneer Courthouse Square, Portland (24 August 1988−)
- Pennsylvania
  - WJAC-TV Weather Beacon Johnstown, Pennsylvania (1963–)
  - Handy Flame, Equitable Gas, 420 Boulevard of the Allies, Pittsburgh (12 March 1956 − 31 December 1972; dismantled)
  - KDKA-TV Weather Beacon, Gulf Tower, Pittsburgh (1955 – present)(Updated in 2012)
  - WTAE-TV Weather Cone, Carnegie Science Center, Pittsburgh (2000–)
  - Berks County Courthouse, 633 Court Street, Reading (???? − 1995)
- South Dakota
  - KELO-TV weatherball, Sherman Hotel, Aberdeen (dismantled)
  - KDLO-TV weatherball, Marvin Hughitt Hotel, 375 Dakota S., Huron (6 April 1960 − ????; dismantled)
  - First National Bank, Pierre
  - KELO weatherball, 100 North Phillips Avenue, Sioux Falls (dismantled)
  - National Bank of South Dakota (now US Bank), 141 N. Main Avenue, Sioux Falls (non-functioning)
    - East Branch, East 10th & Omaha, Sioux Falls (dismantled)
    - South Branch, 33rd & Minnesota, Sioux Falls (non-functioning)
    - Sunset Branch, West 41st & Louise Avenue (dismantled)
  - KDLO weatherball tower, 421 9th Av SE, Watertown (dismantled)
  - KXLG Weatherball, 835 Jensen Avenue, Watertown (22 May 2014 − present)
- Tennessee
  - Provident Life and Accident Insurance Company, Maclellan Building, 721 Broad Street, Chattanooga (12 January 1952 – ????; dismantled)
  - Life & Casualty Tower, Nashville (non-functioning)
- Texas
  - WNL Weather Tower, Western National Life Insurance, 205 SE 10th Avenue, Amarillo (dismantled)
  - Mercantile Weather Tower, Mercantile National Bank Building, Dallas (1958–1993; 12 February 2008 – present)
  - Blue Flame Building, 100 North Stanton Street, El Paso (26 March 1955 – ????; 27 July 2021 – present)
  - Texas National Bank/Conoco Weather Eye, Travis Tower, 1300 Main Street, Houston (17 October 1955 – 1964; removed September 1970)
  - Alamo National Bank weather spire (now Drury Plaza Hotel), 105 S. St. Mary's Street, San Antonio (non-functioning)
- Utah
  - Ford's Finance & Insurance, 2627 Washington Boulevard, Ogden (????−????; dismantled)
  - KSL-TV 5 Eyewitness Weather Tower, Trolley Square, Salt Lake City (1999−)
  - KTVX Weather Ball, 2175 West 1700 South, Salt Lake City (????−)
  - Walker Center, 175 S. Main Street, Salt Lake City (1953–1982; 2008–)
  - Walker Bank Ogden Metropolitan Office, 3600 S. Washington Blvd., Ogden (7 October 1972–????; dismantled)
- Virginia
  - Newmarket Shopping Center, Newport News (1953 − ????; dismantled)
- Wisconsin
  - Weather Beacon, H. C. Prange Co., 301 N. Washington Street, Green Bay (26 September 1952 − ????; dismantled)
  - Weather Flame, Wisconsin Gas Building, 626 East Wisconsin Avenue, Milwaukee (1956 – 1973, 1985 − present)
  - Oshkosh National Bank, 300 N. Main Street, Oshkosh (9 May 1952 − ????; dismantled)
  - Weather 9, WAOW, 1908 Grand Avenue, Wausau (1965 − present)

== Gallery ==
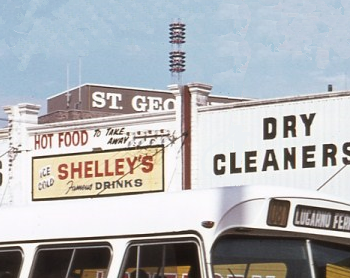
Hurstville

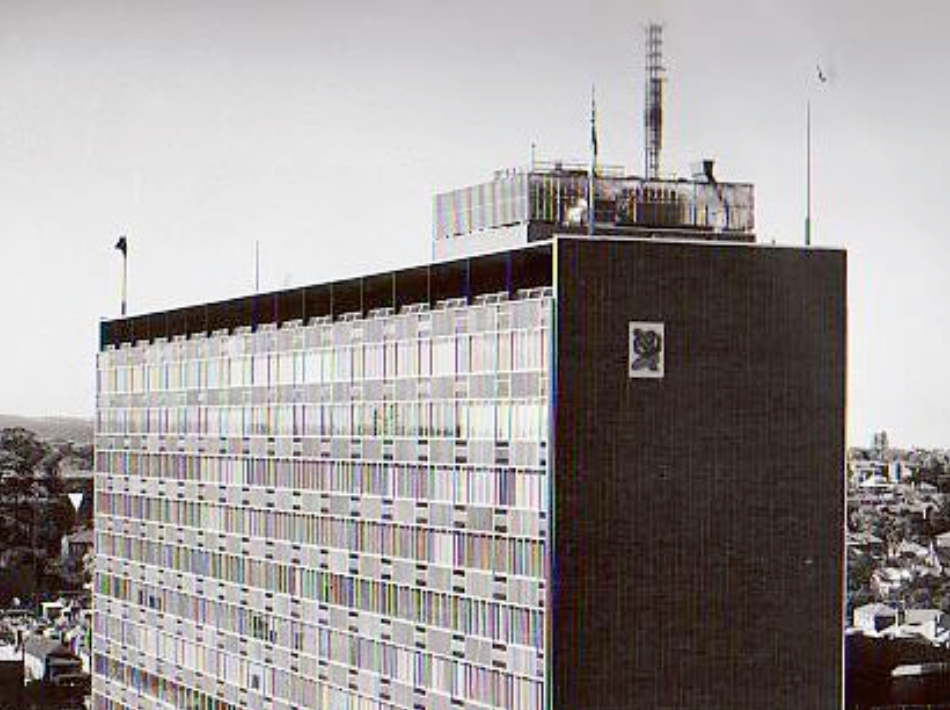
MLC Building, North Sydney

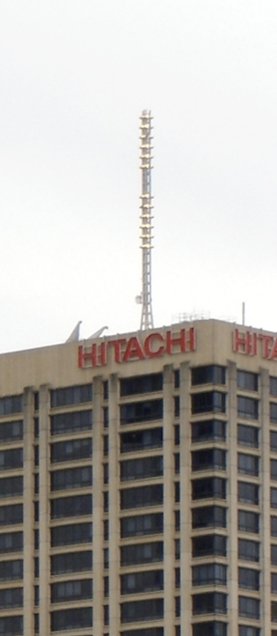
Brisbane

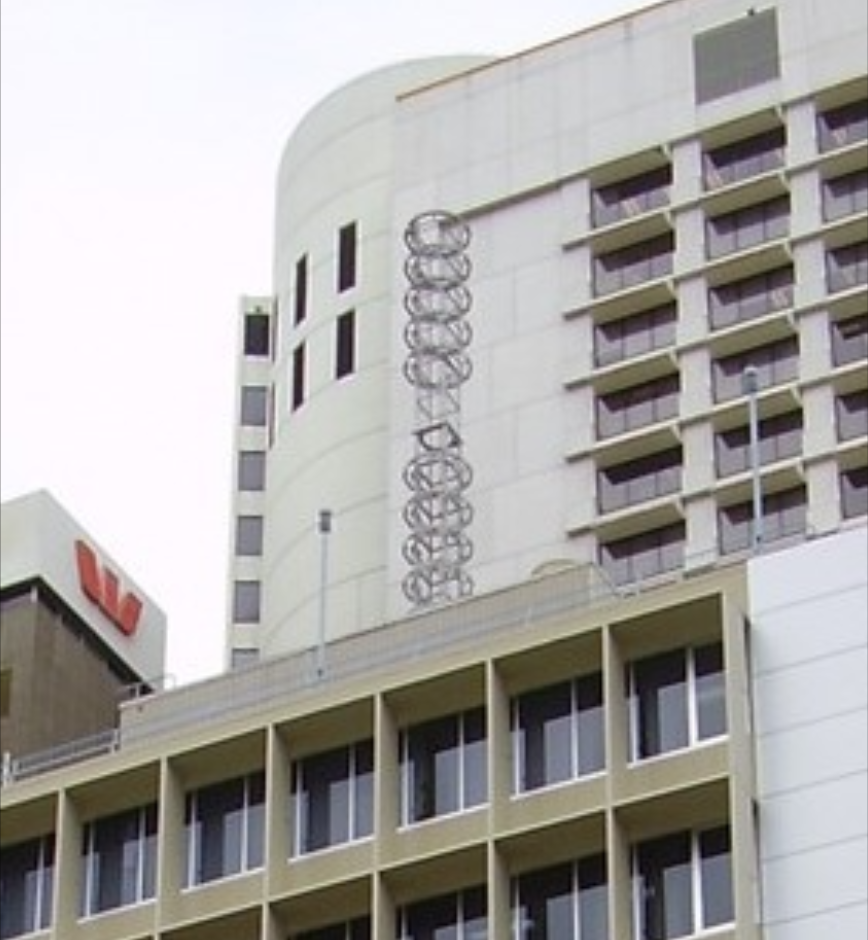
Brisbane

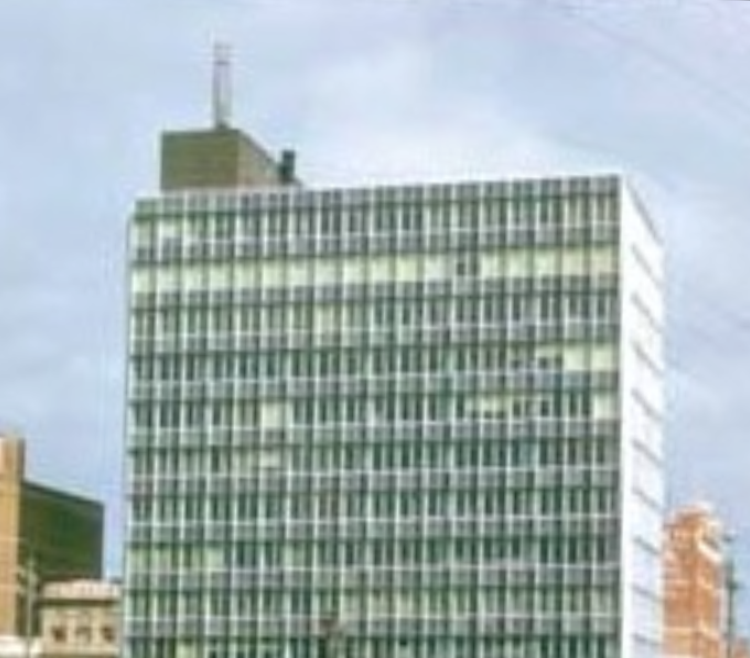
Adelaide

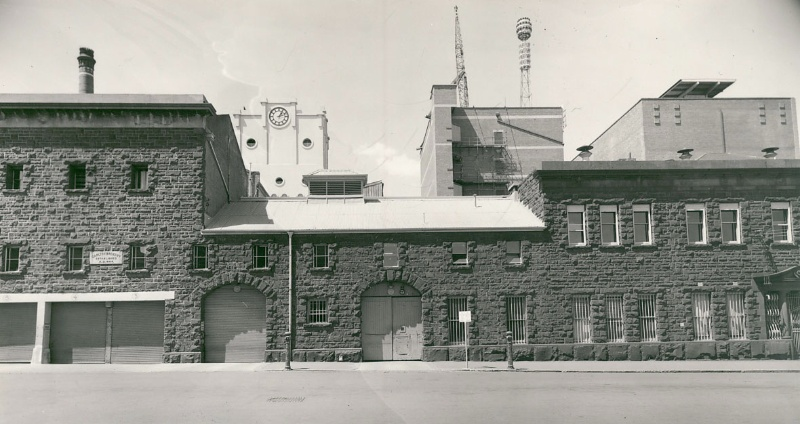
Abbotsford

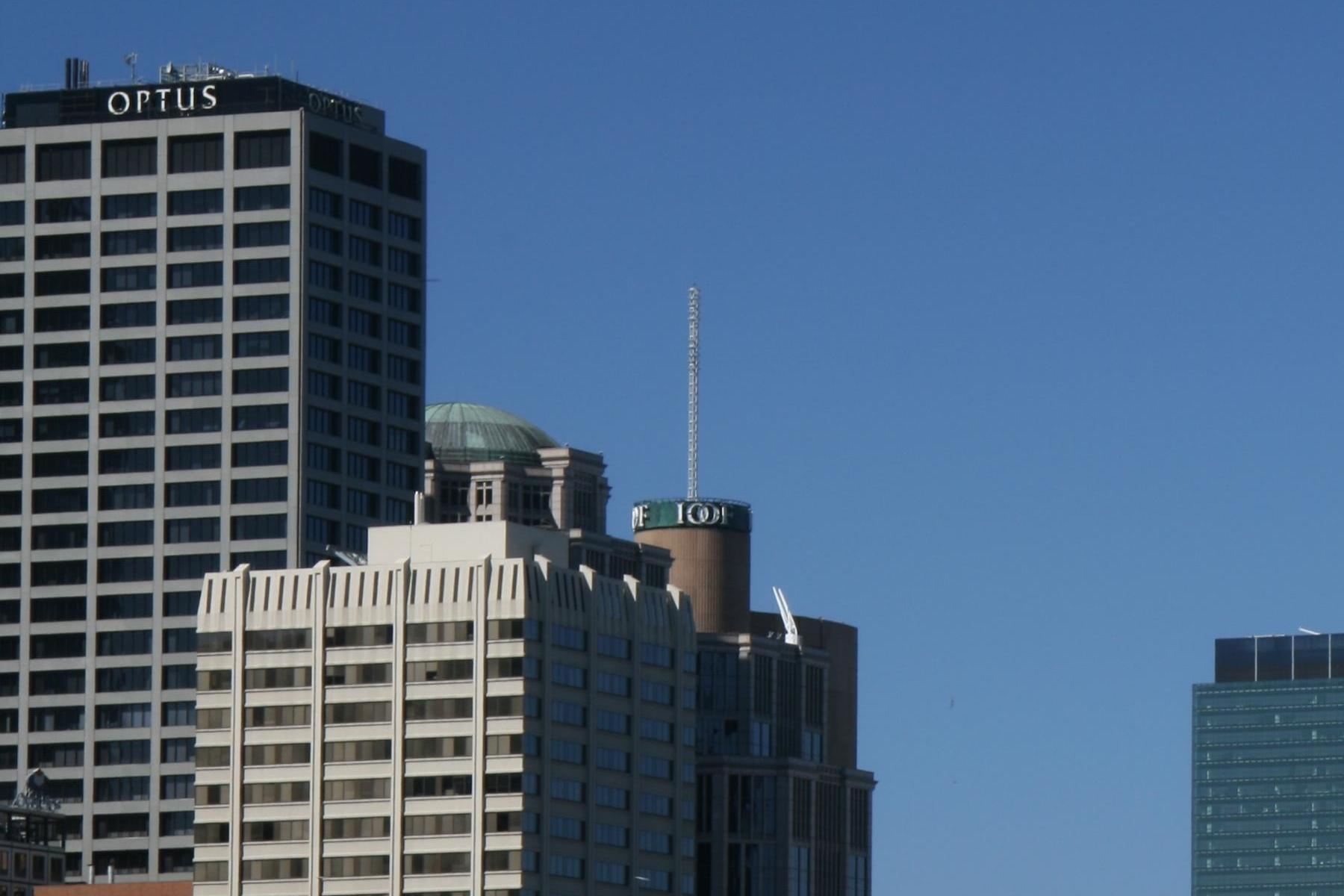
Melbourne

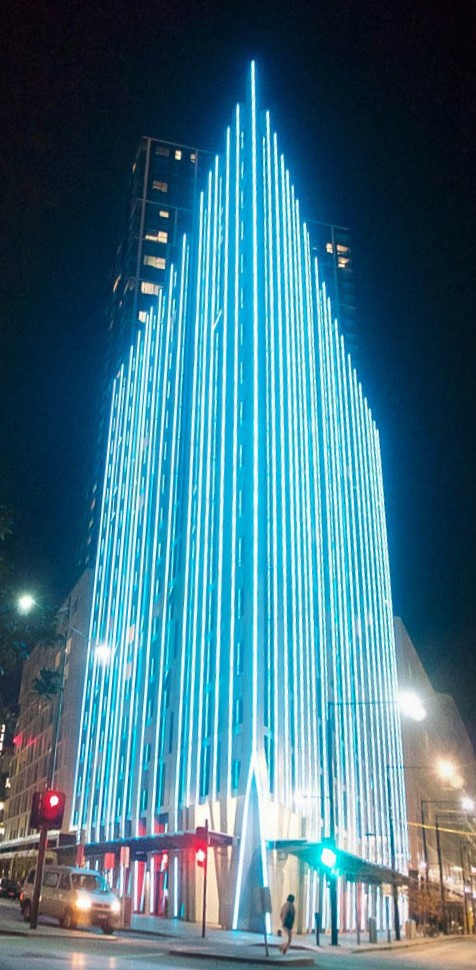
Melbourne

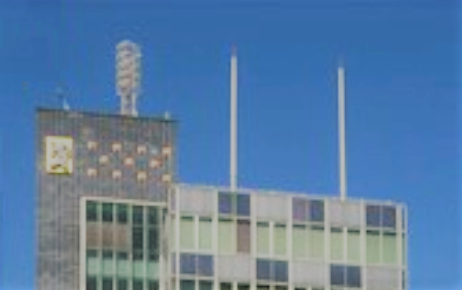
Perth

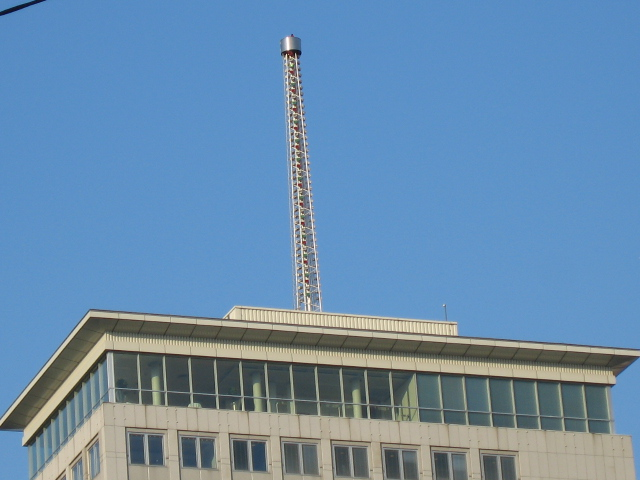
Vienna

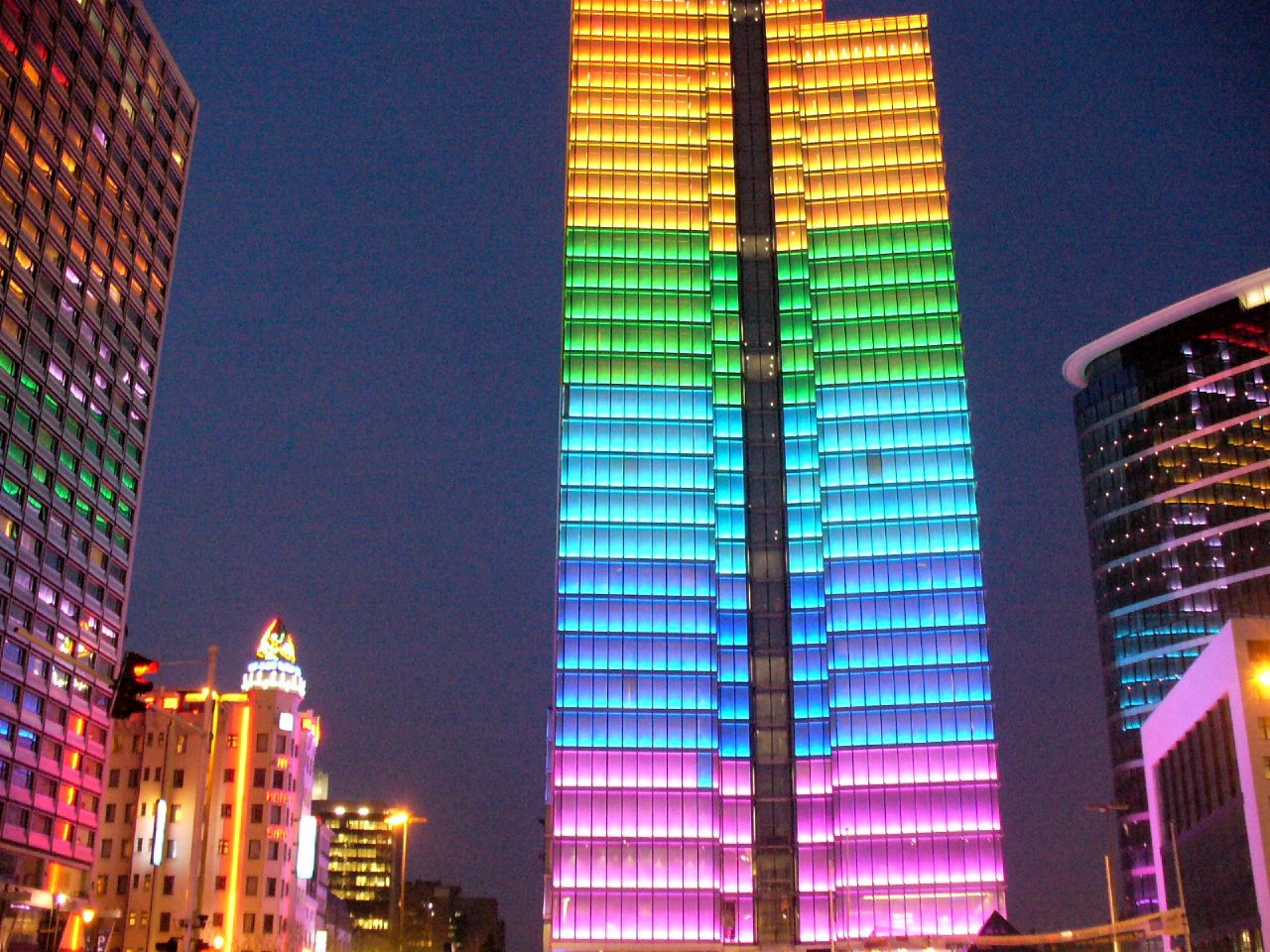
Brussels

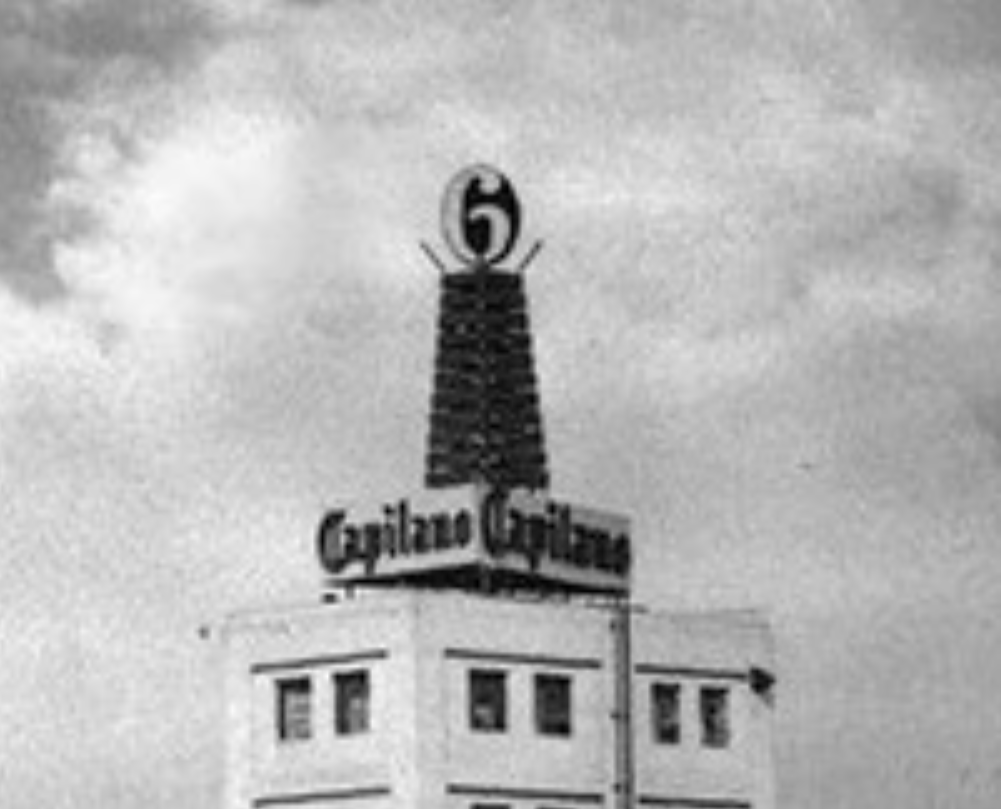
Vancouver

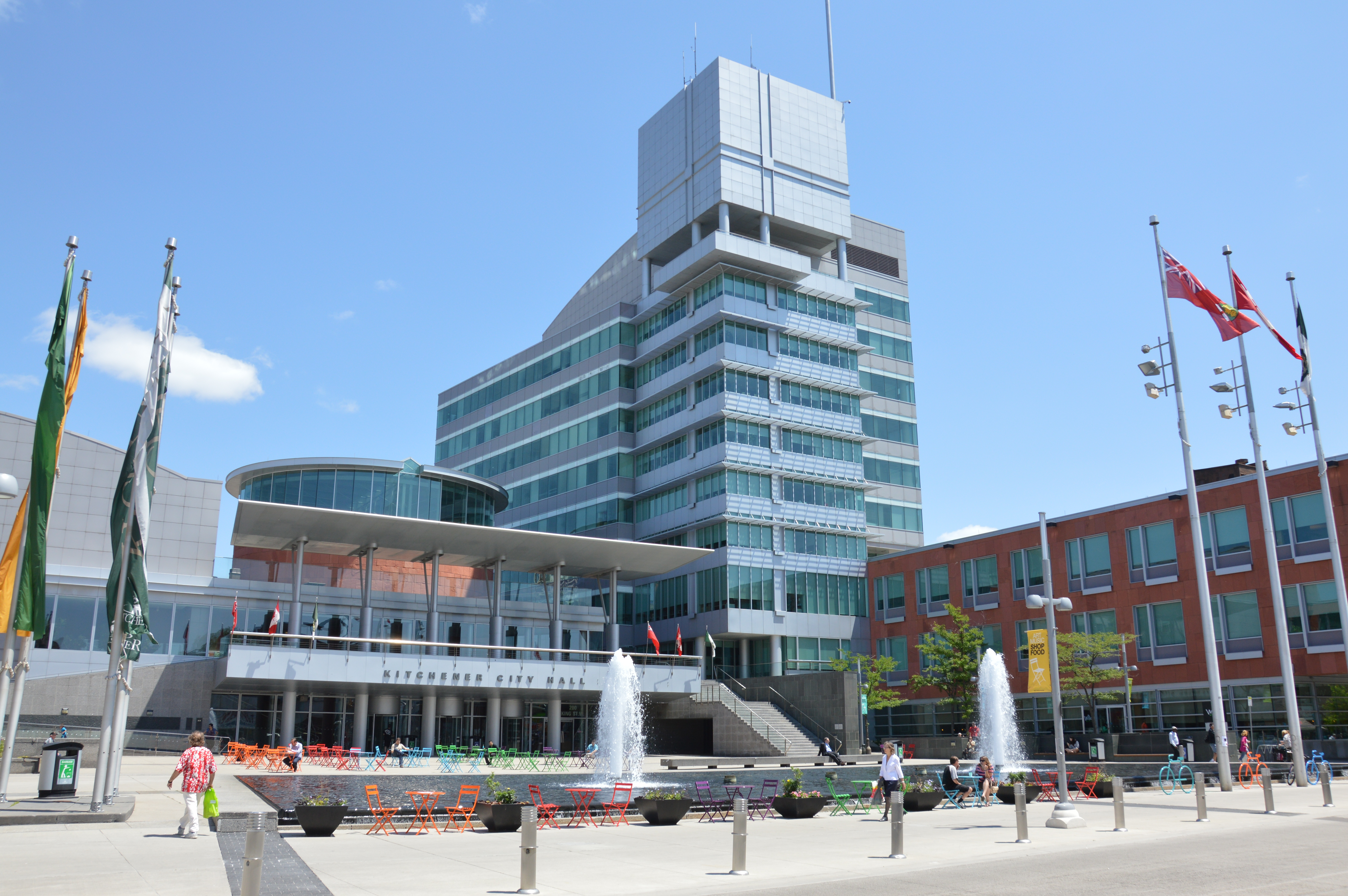
Kitchener

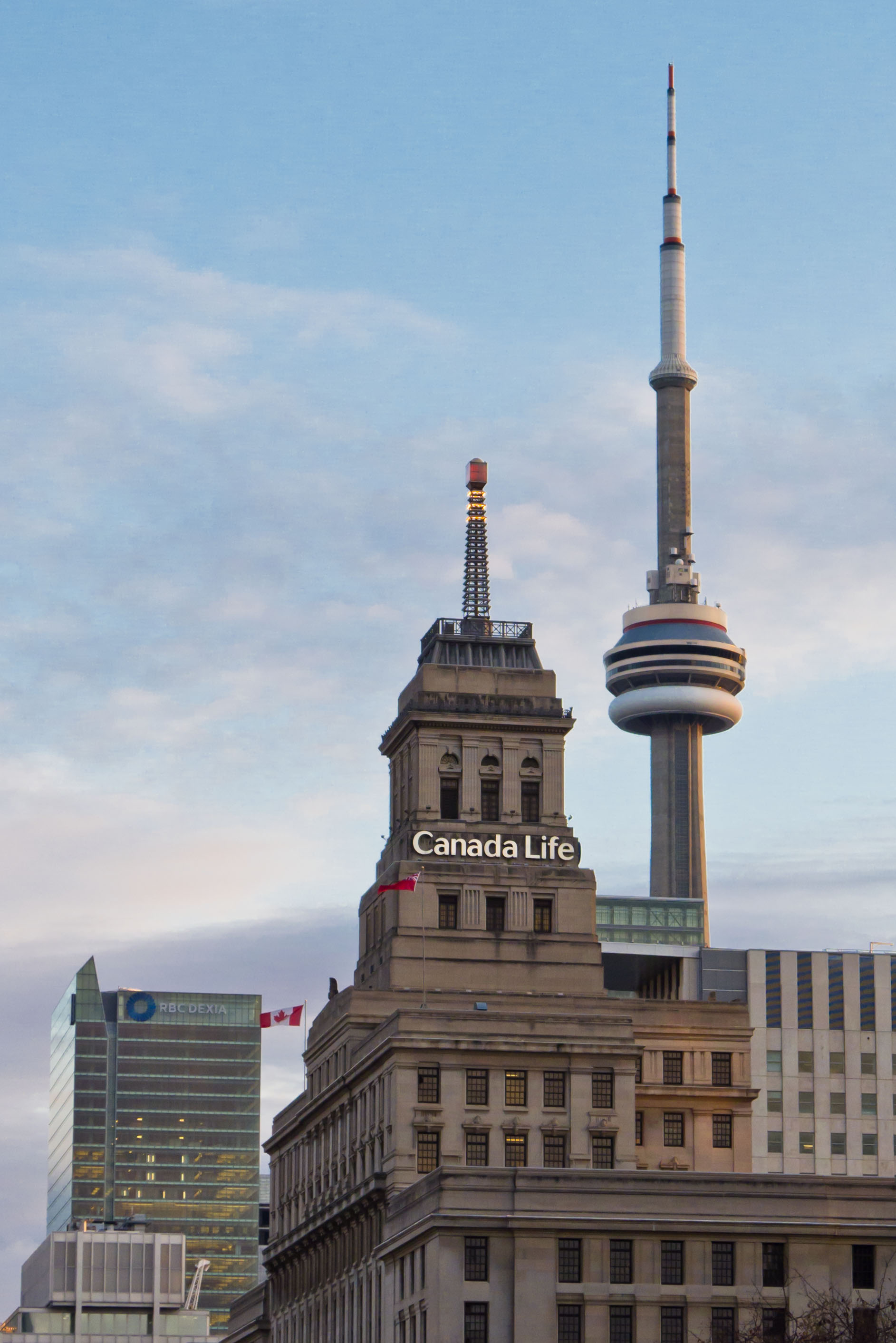
Toronto

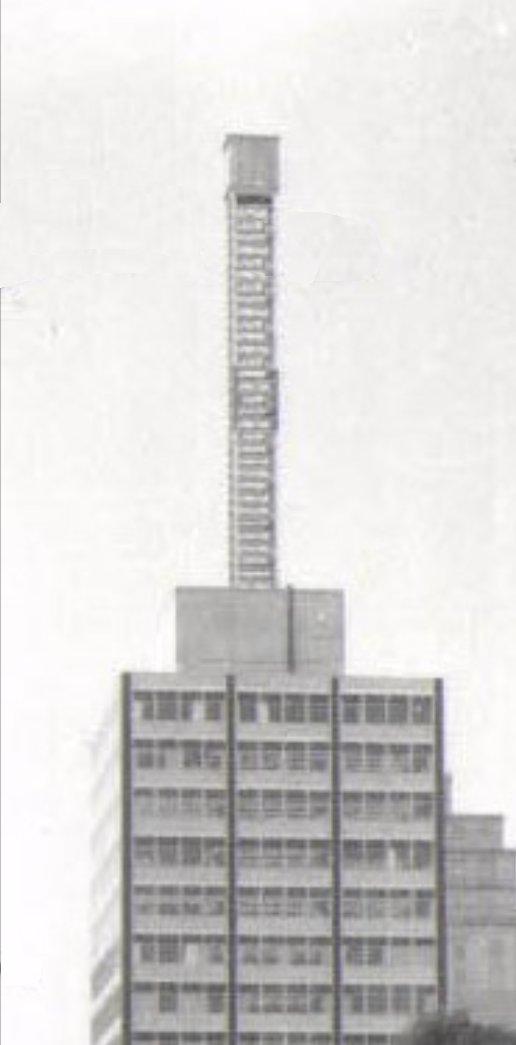
Montreal

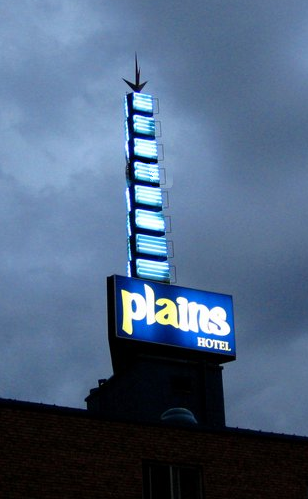
Regina

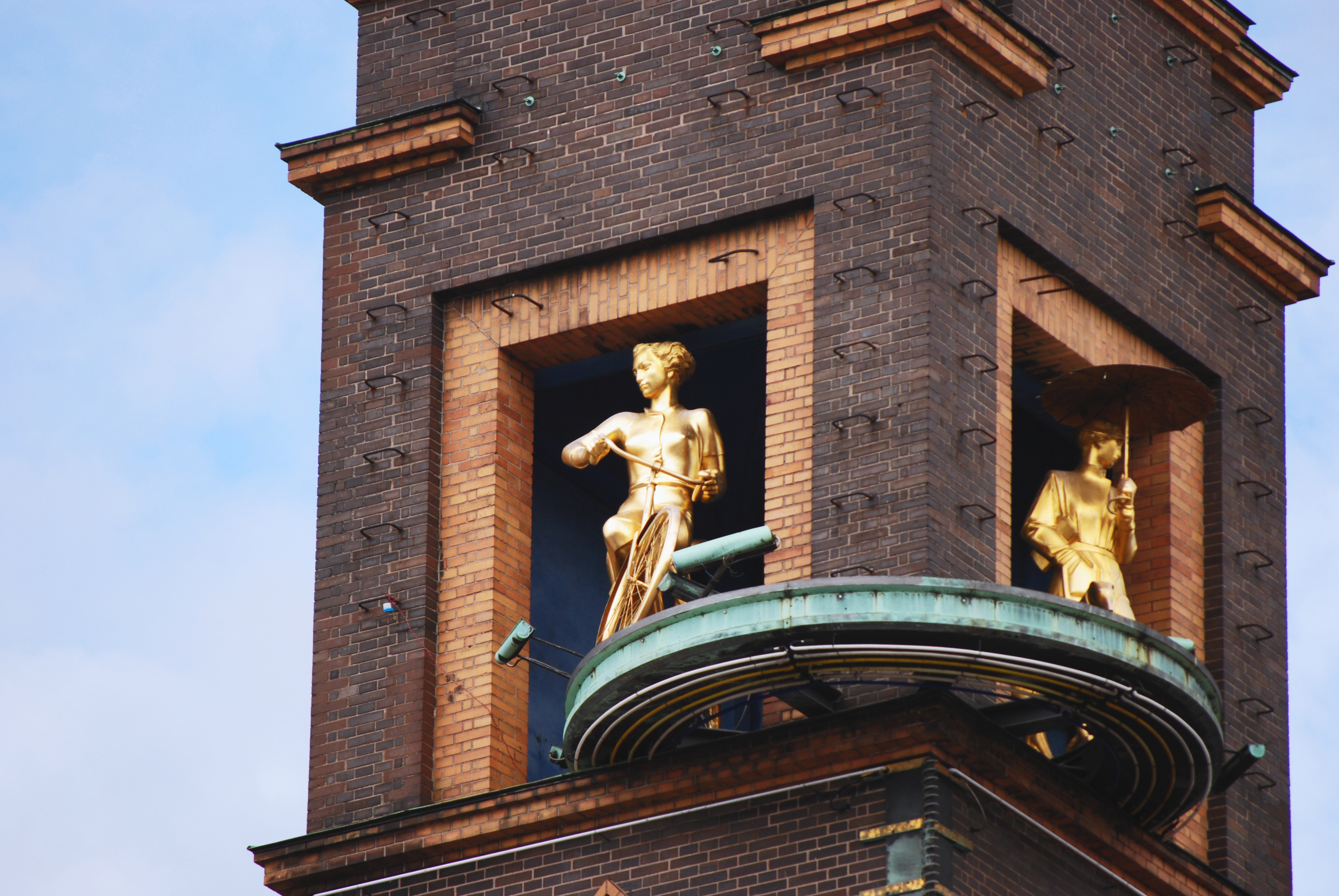
Copenhagen

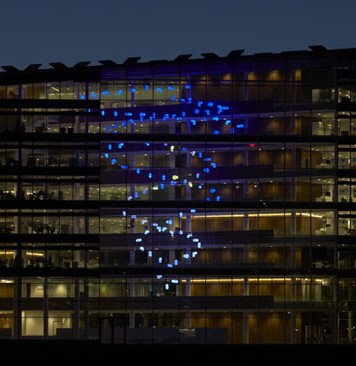
Copenhagen

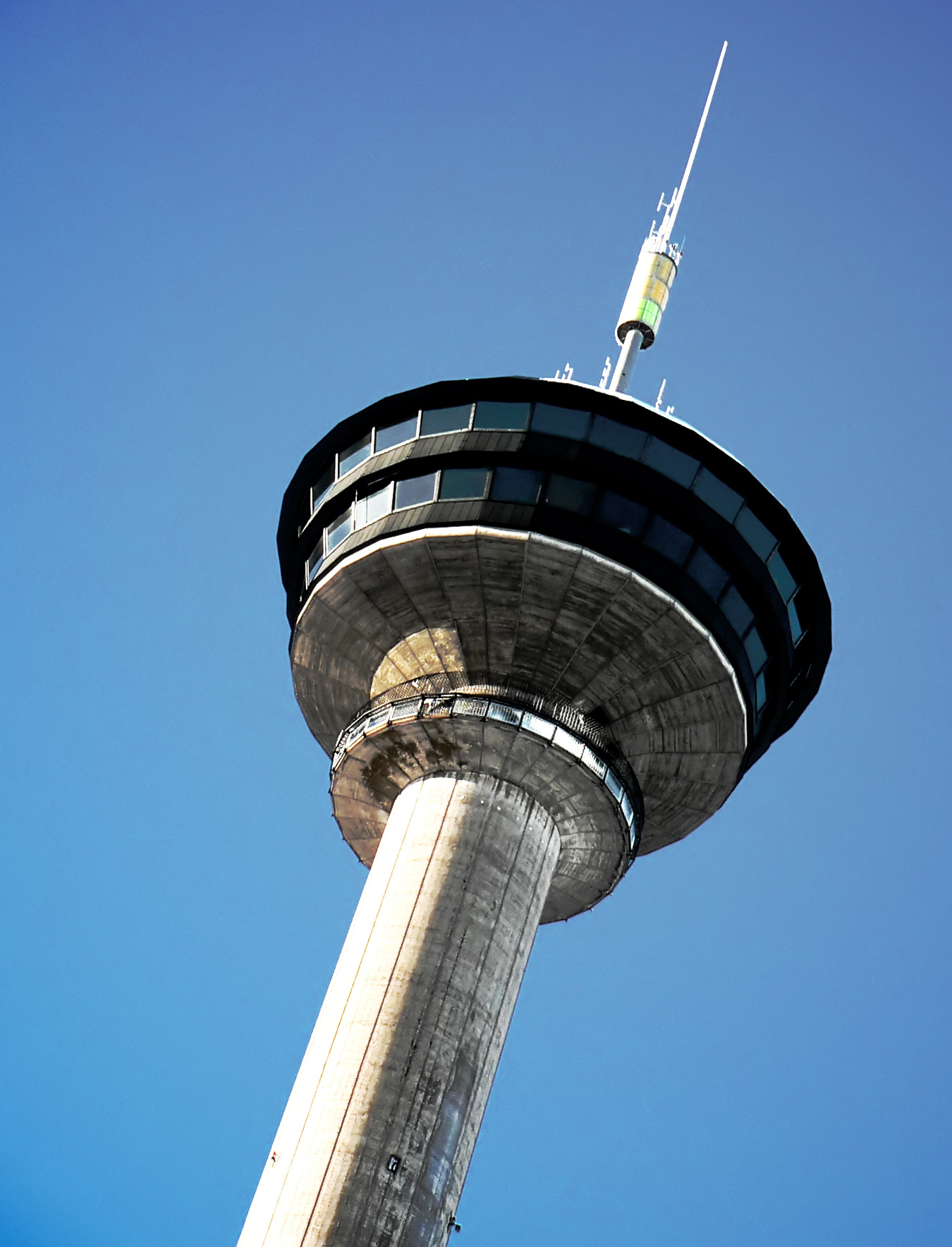
Tampere

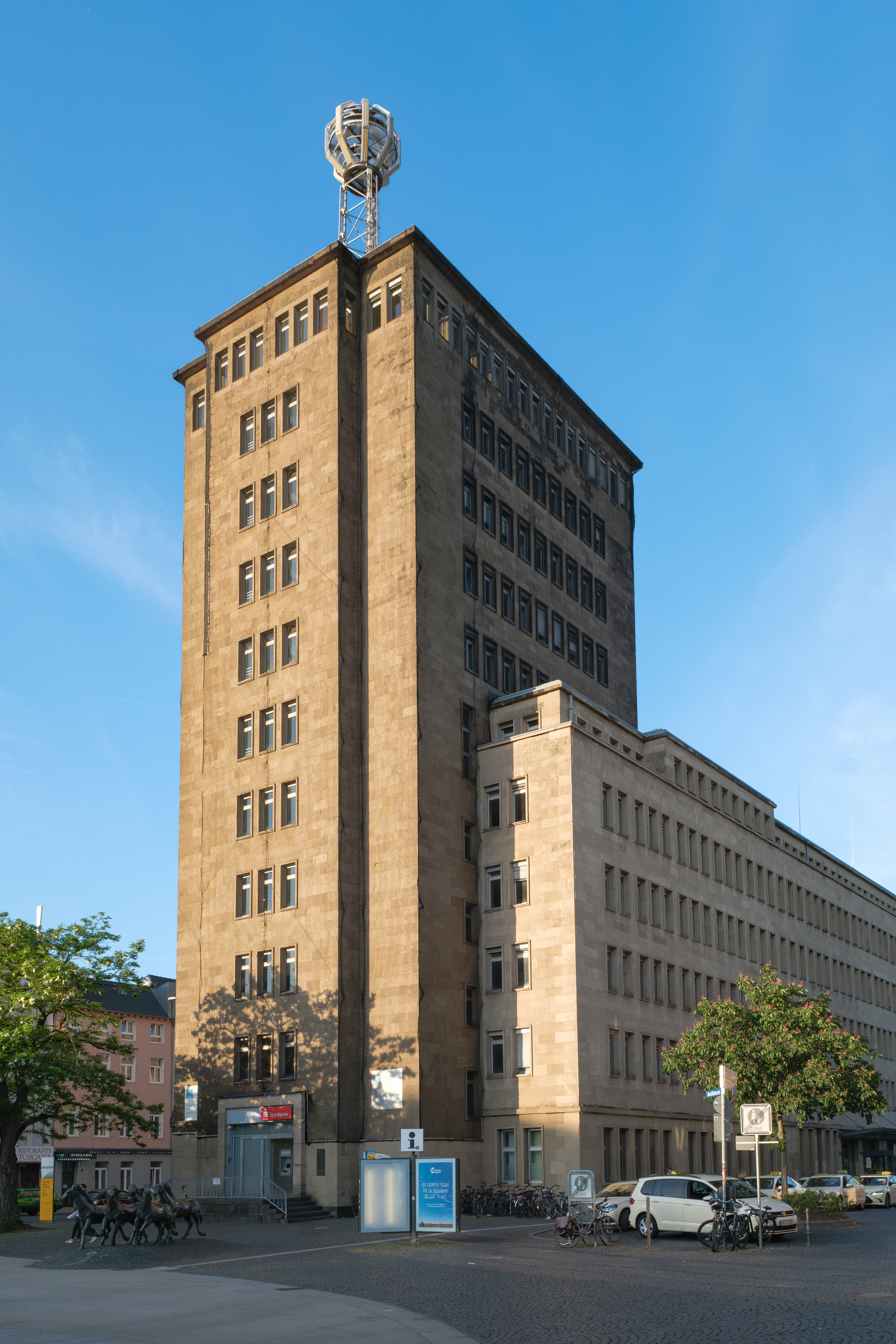
Aachen

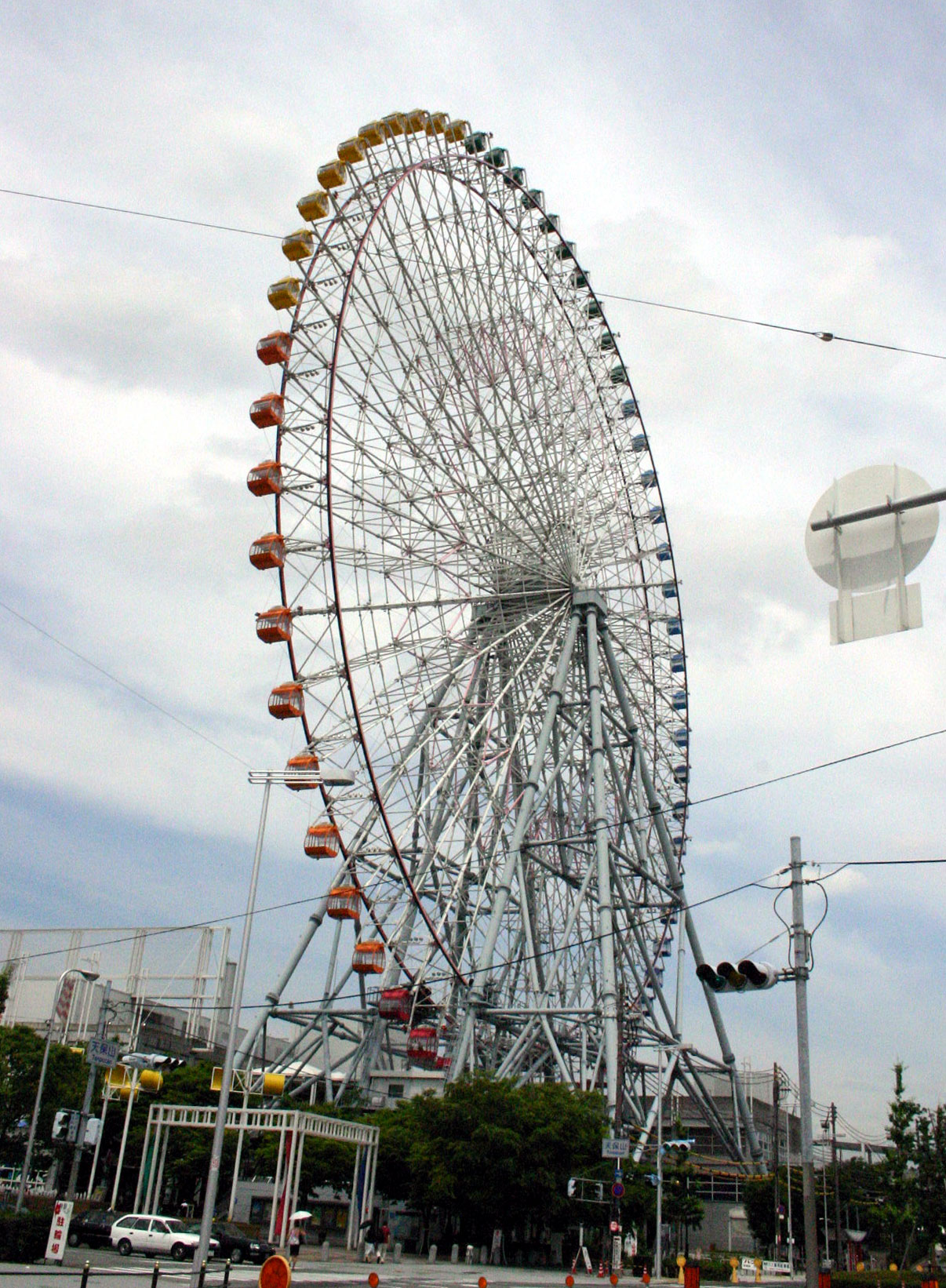
Osaka

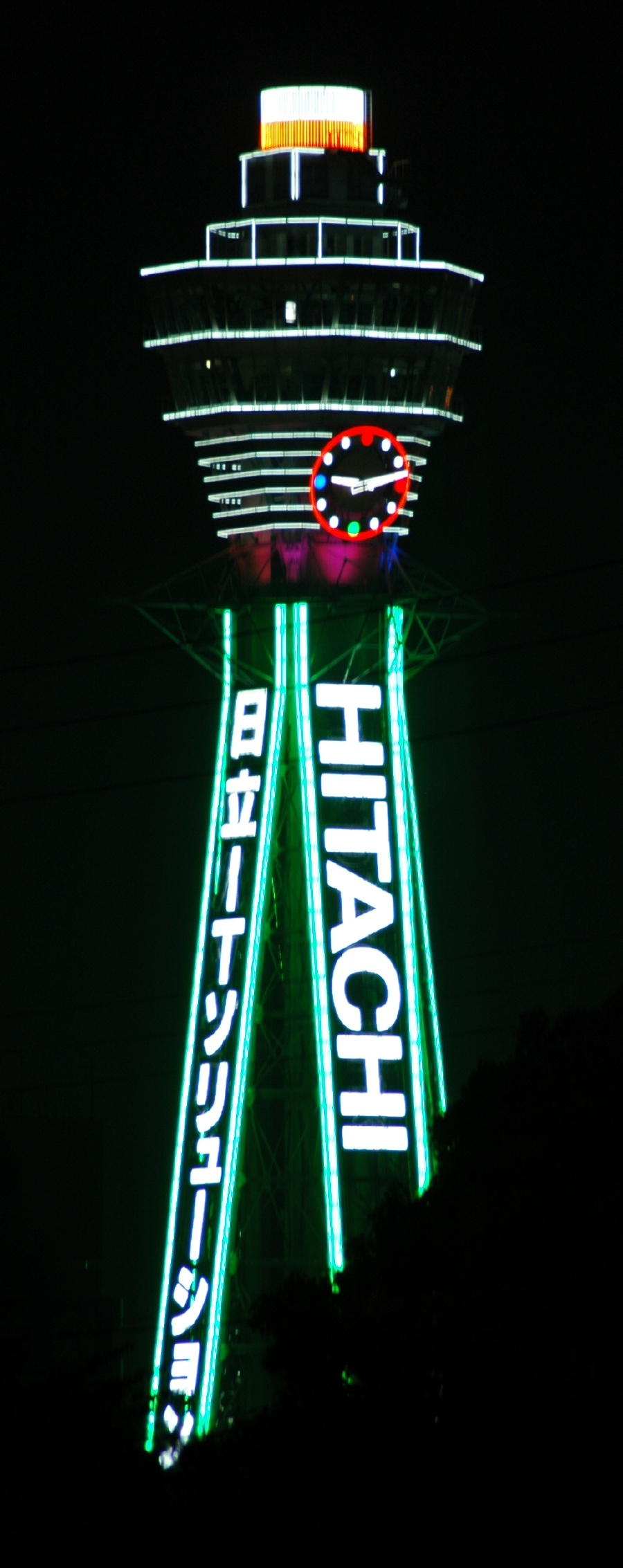
Osaka

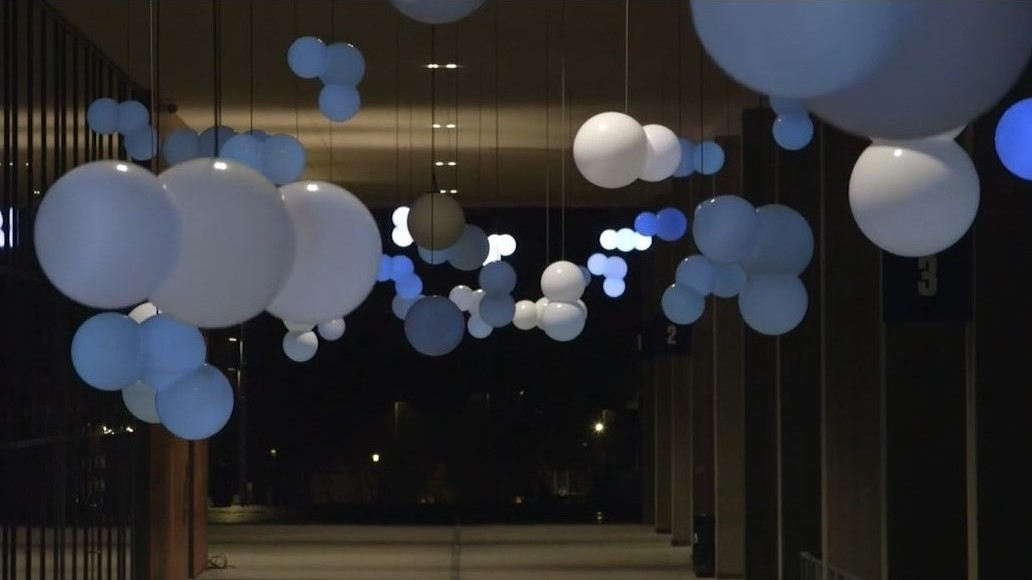
Oslo

Stockholm

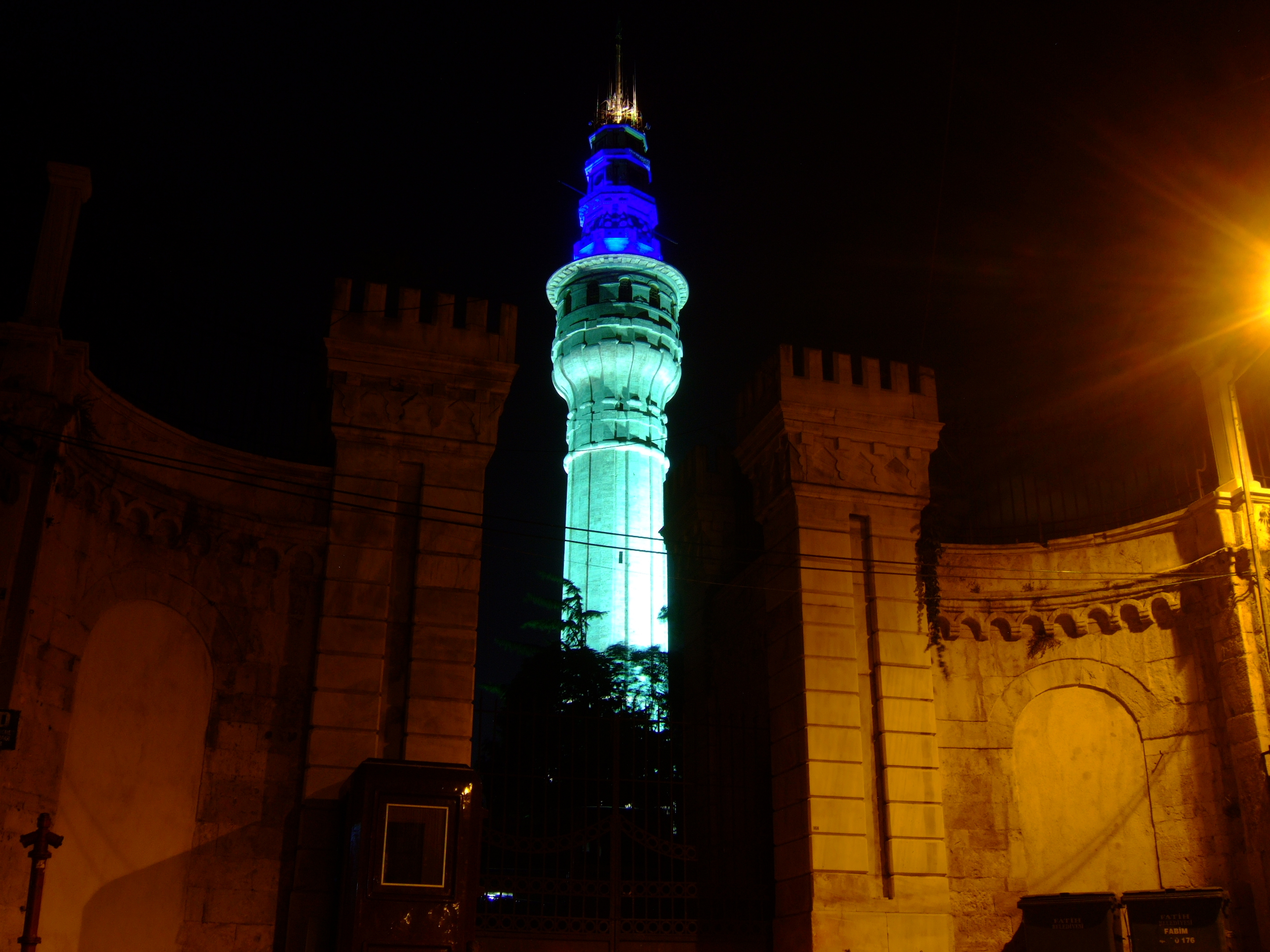
Istanbul

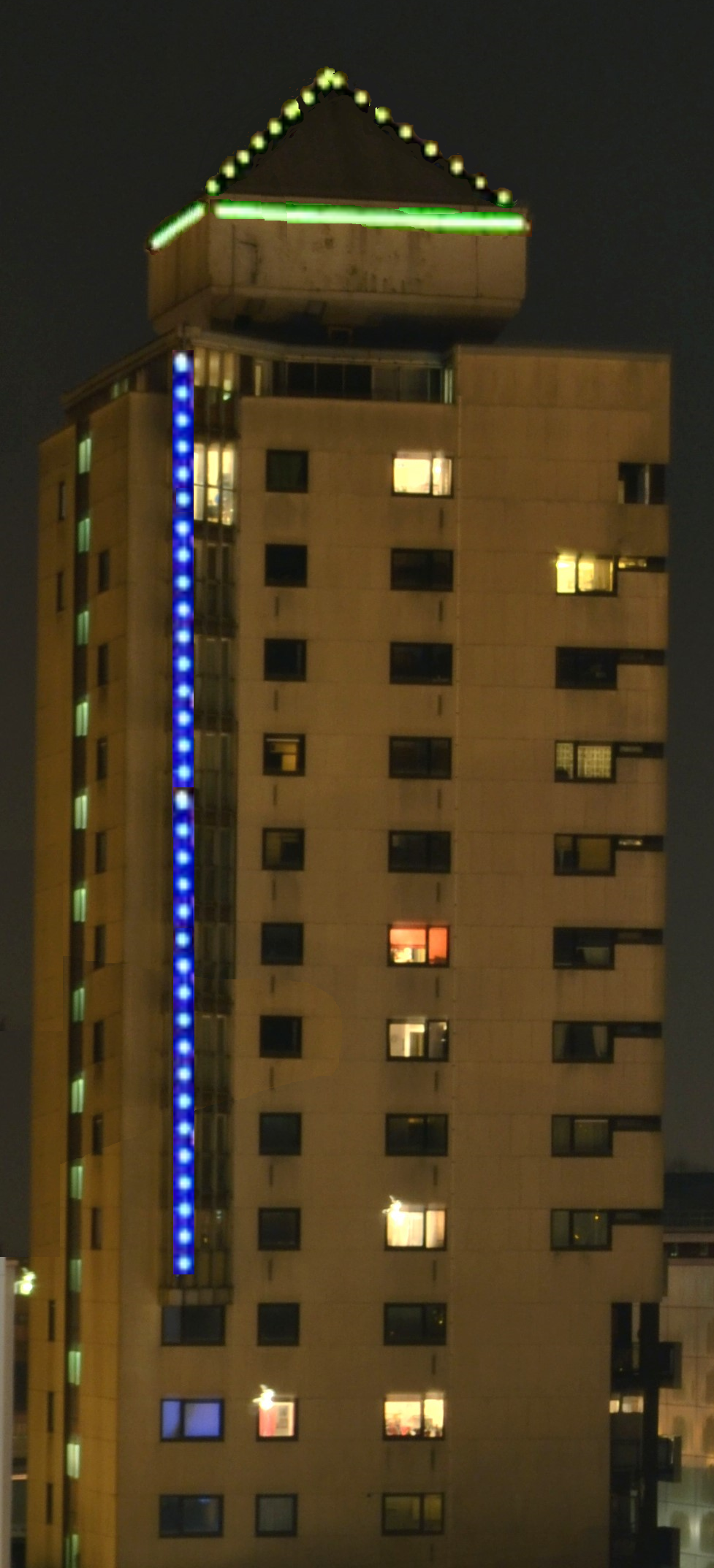
Coventry

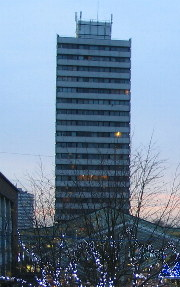
Coventry

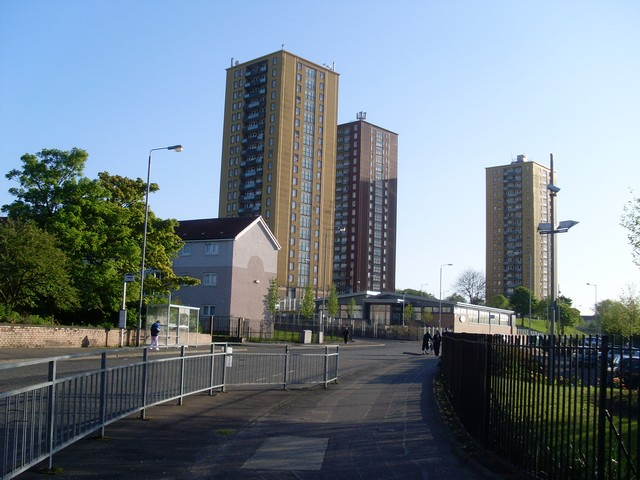
Glasgow

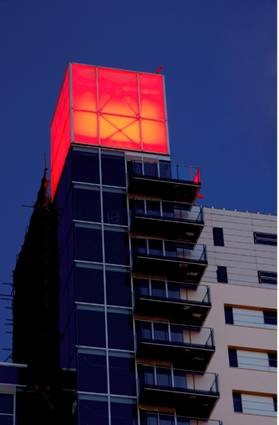
London

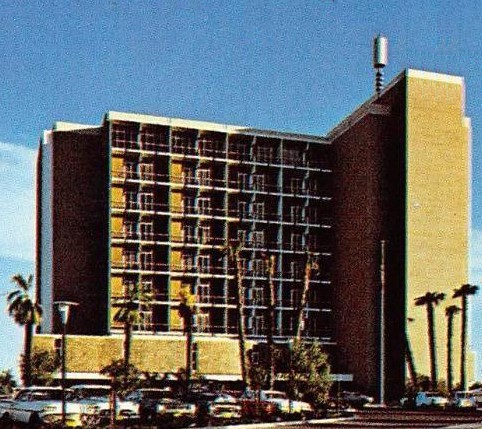
Phoenix

Fresno

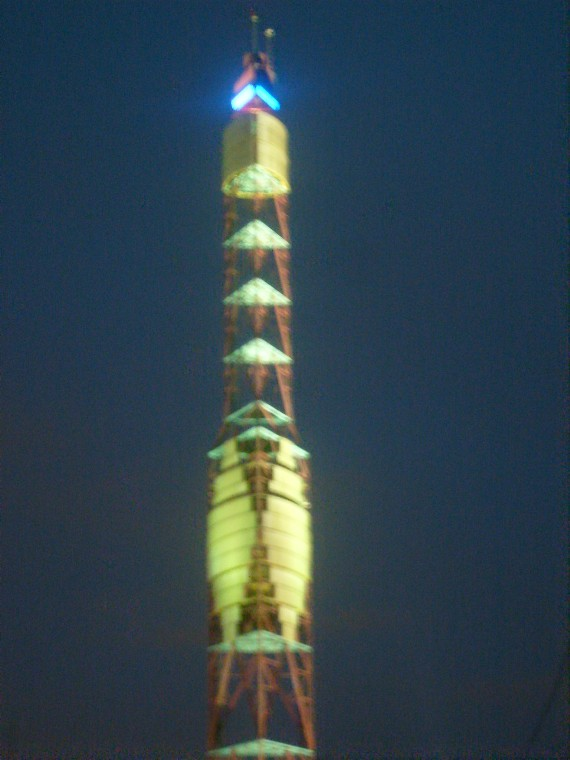
Sacramento

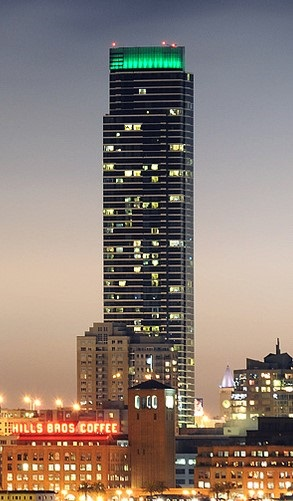
San Francisco

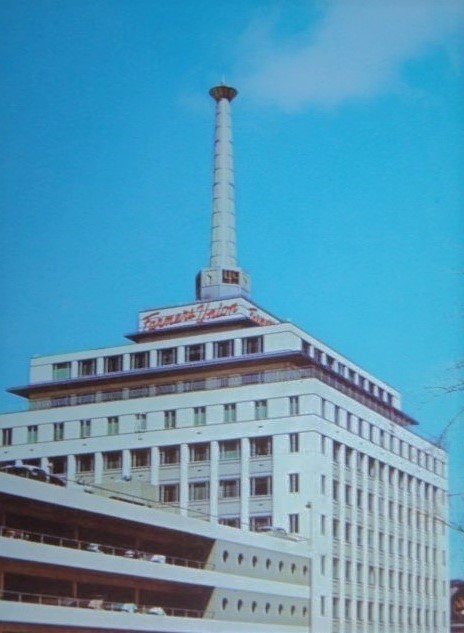
Denver

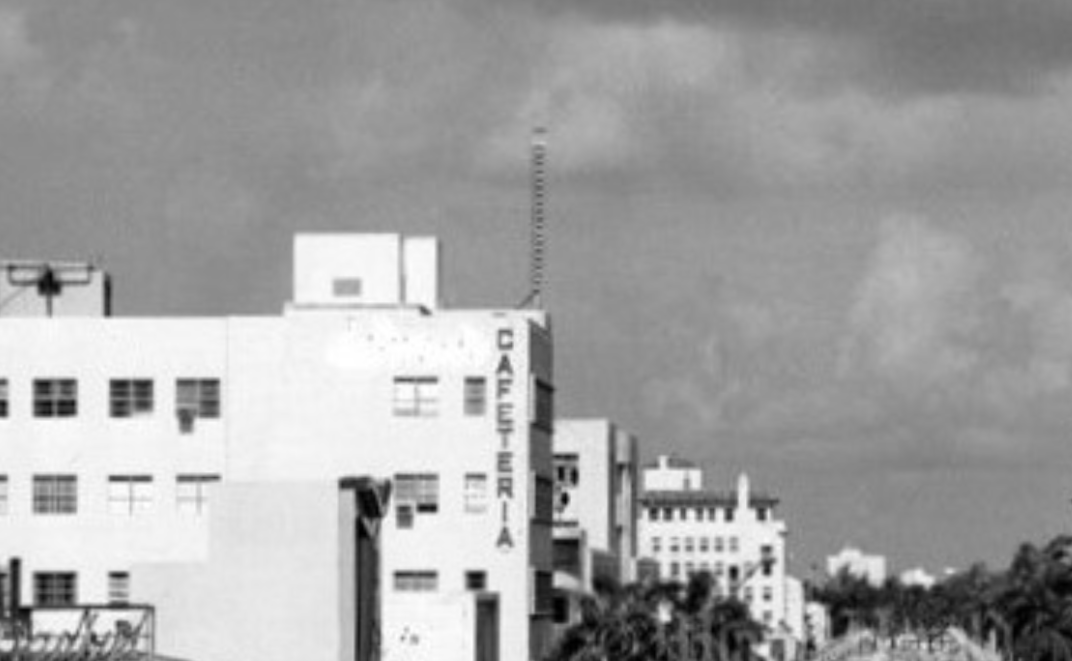
Miami Beach

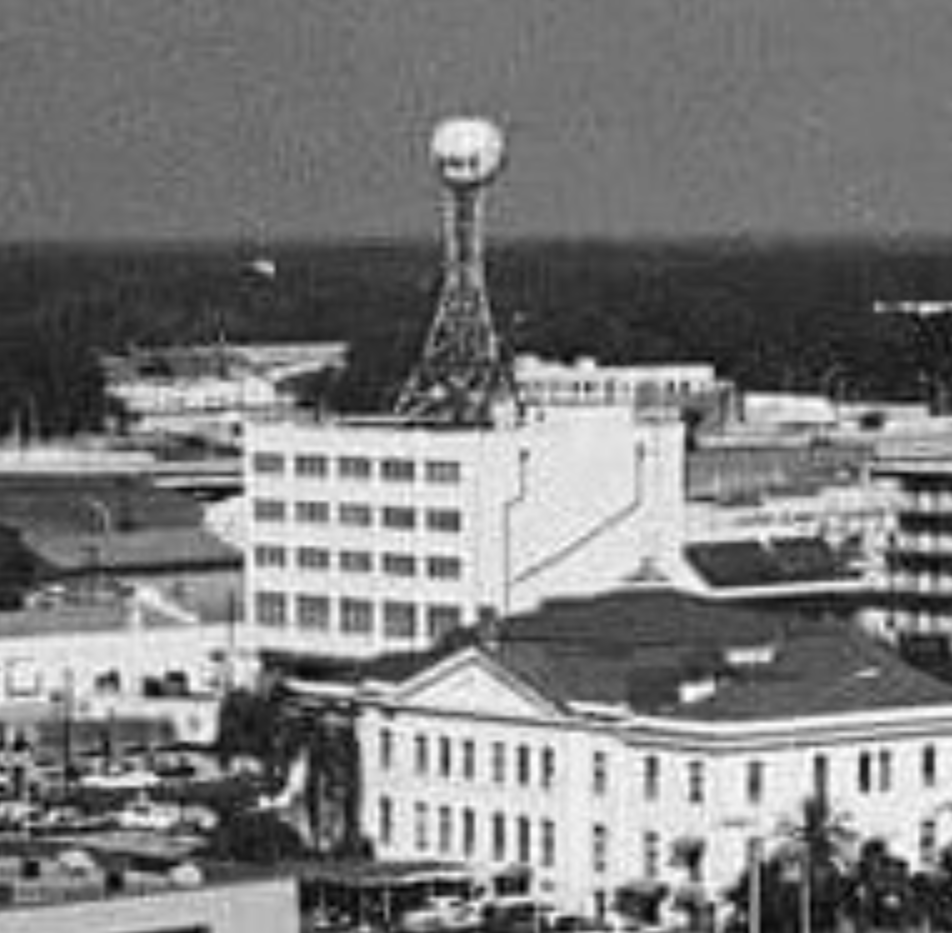
Orlando

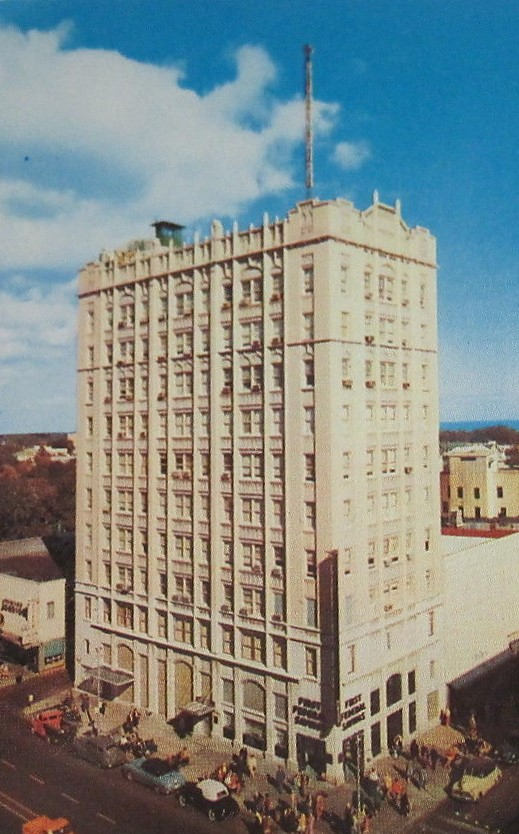
St. Petersburg

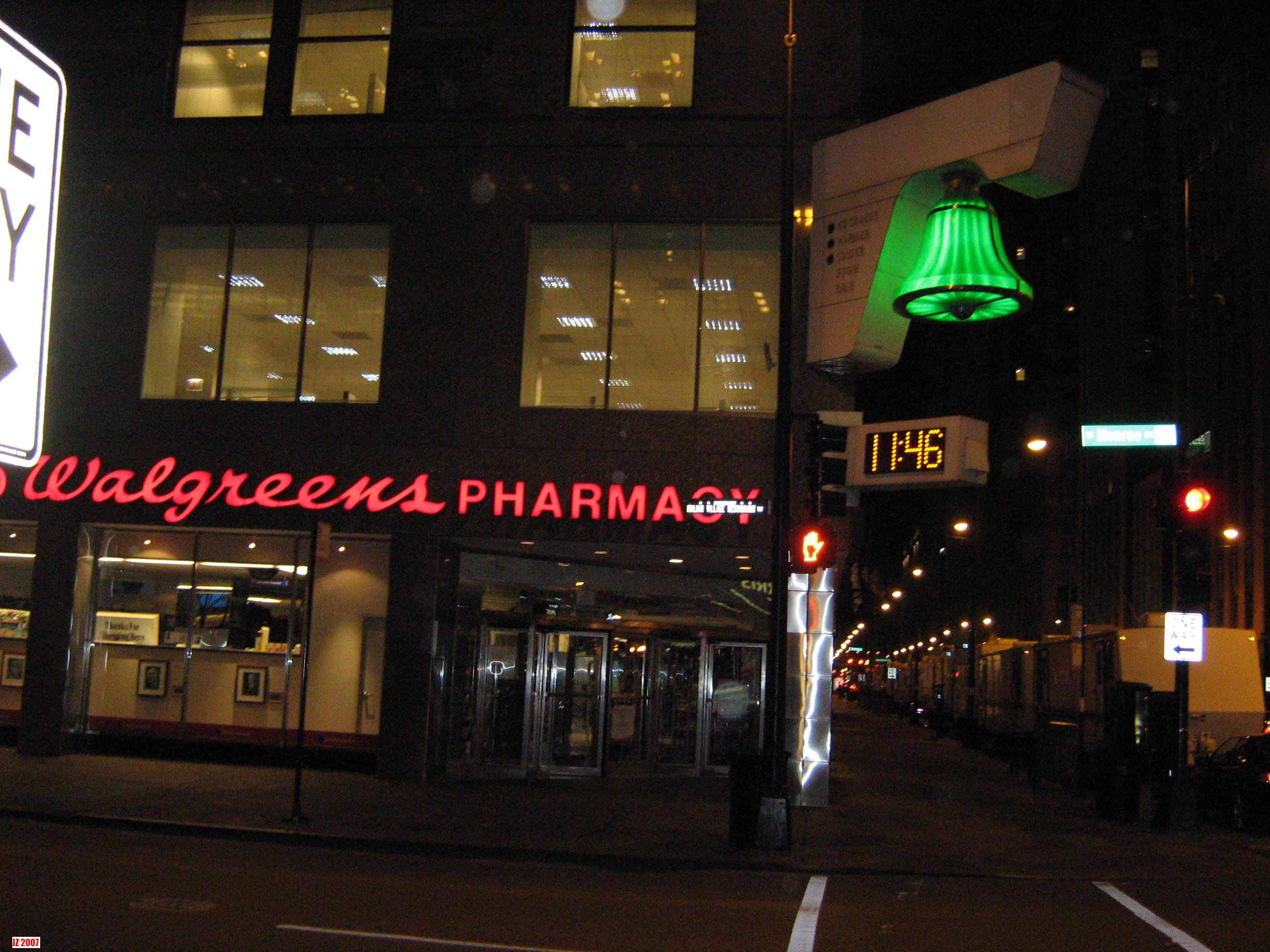
Chicago

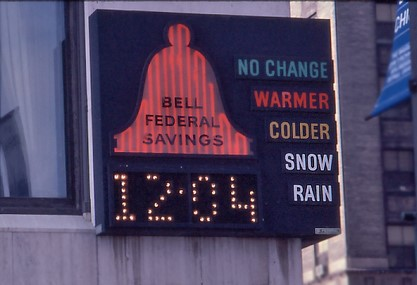
Chicago

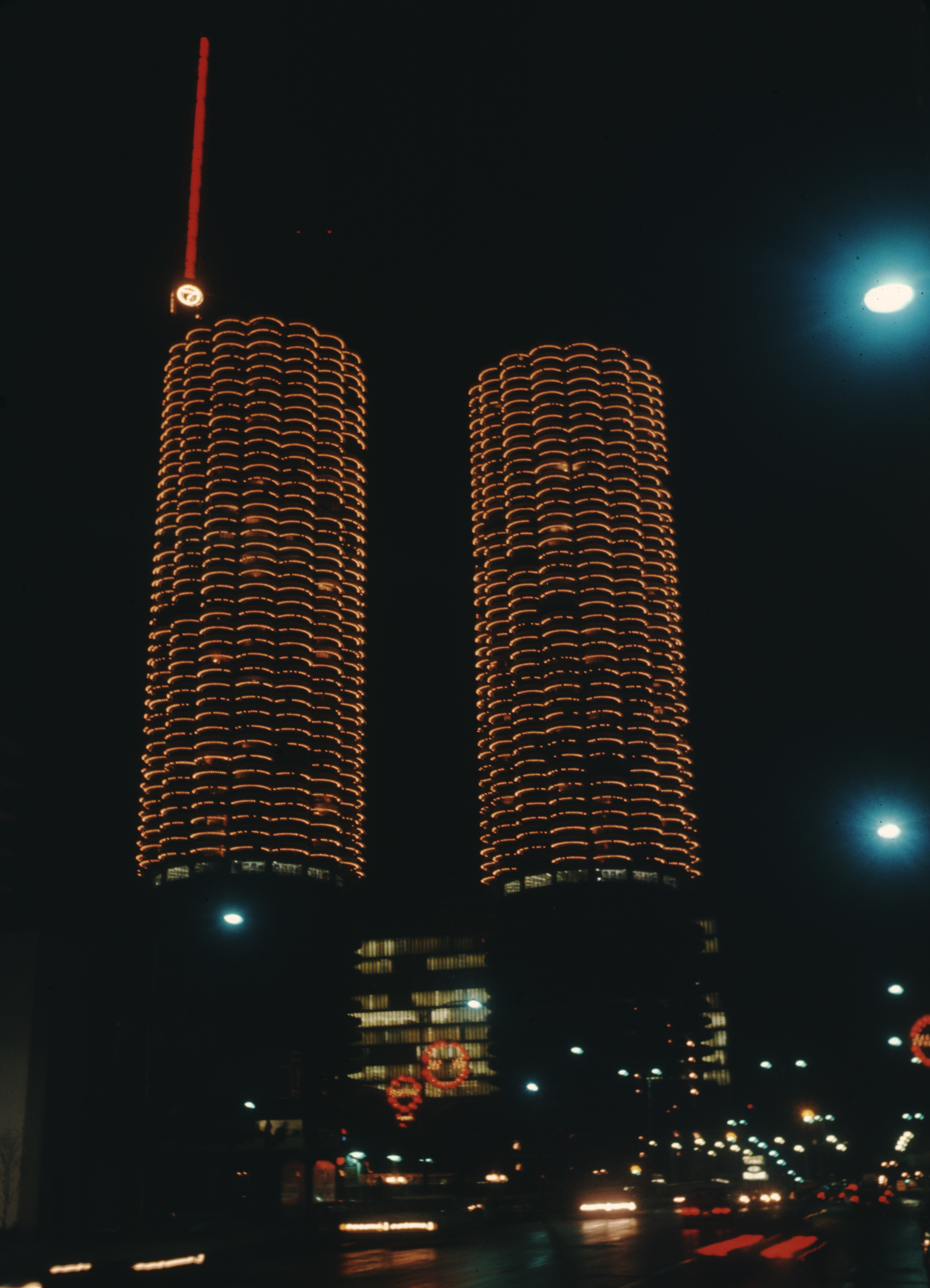
Chicago

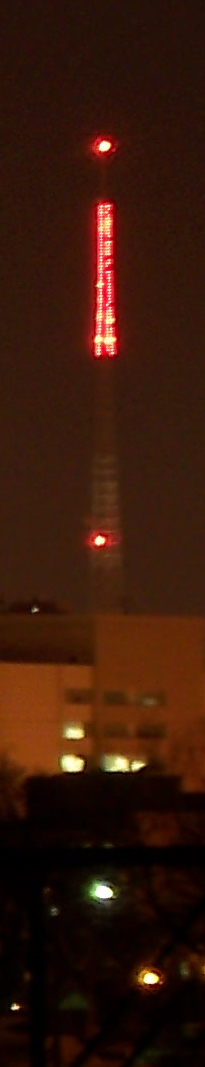
Des Moines

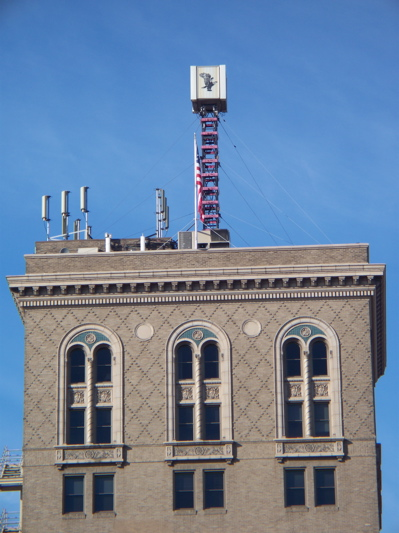
Dubuque

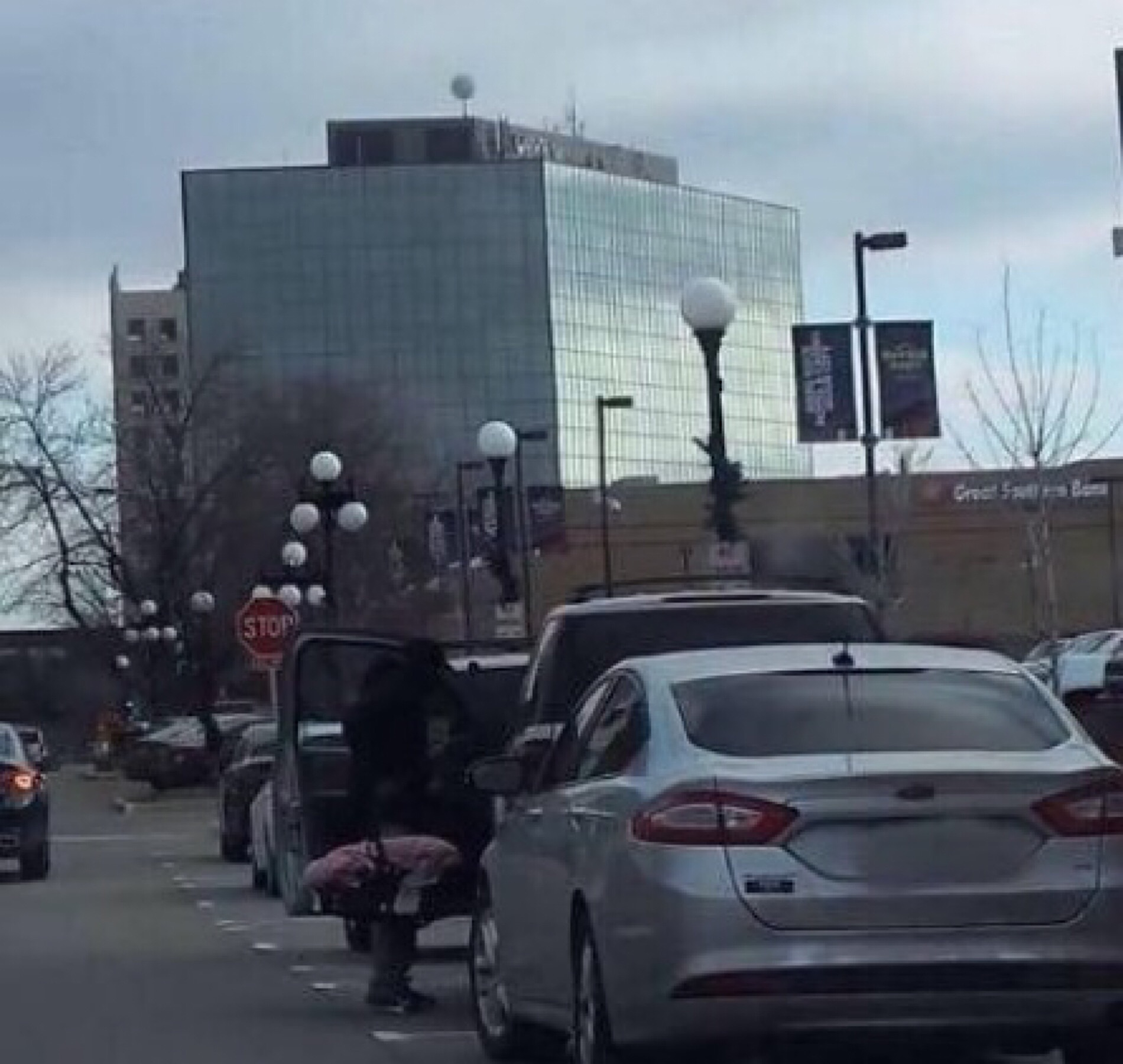
Sioux City

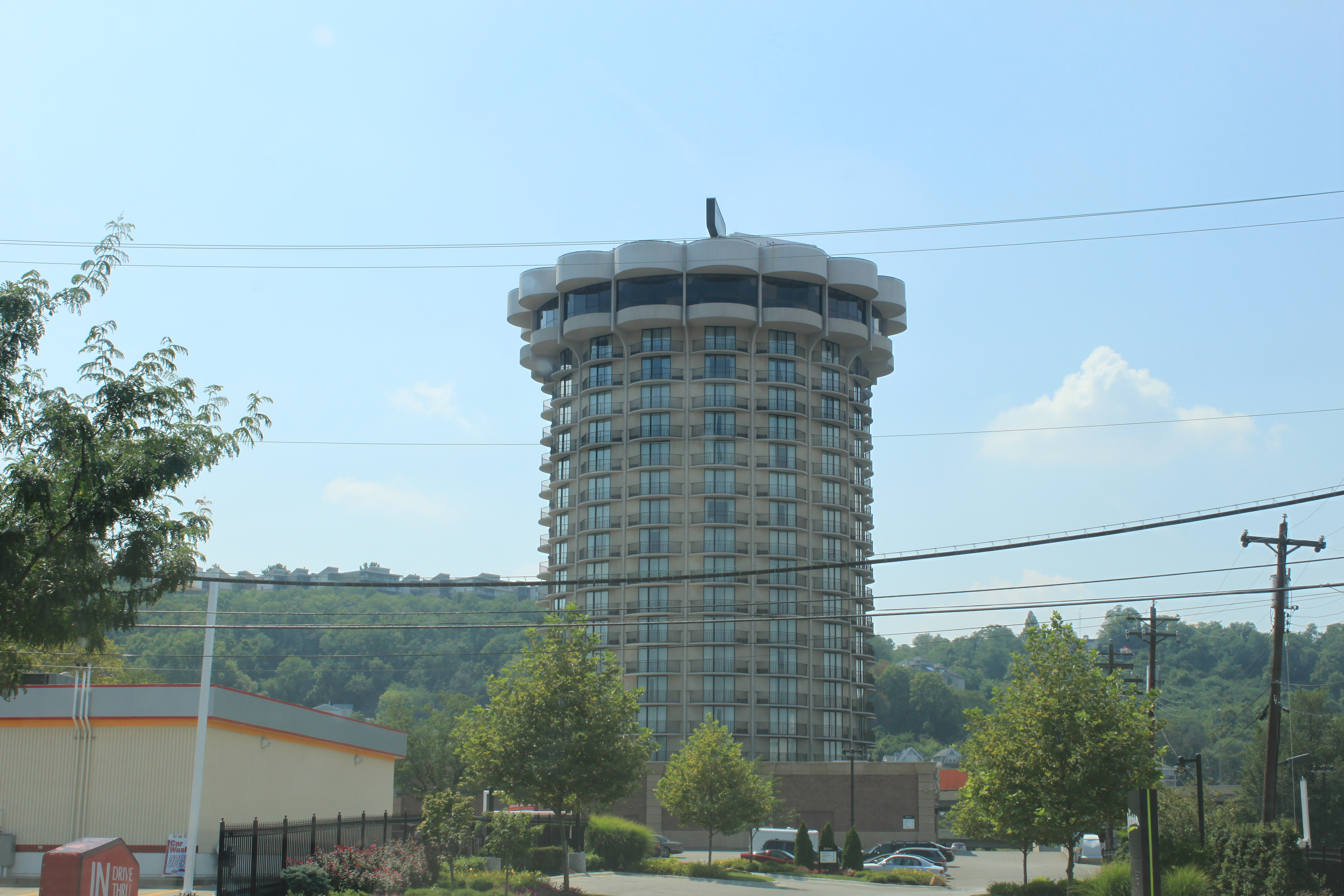
Covington

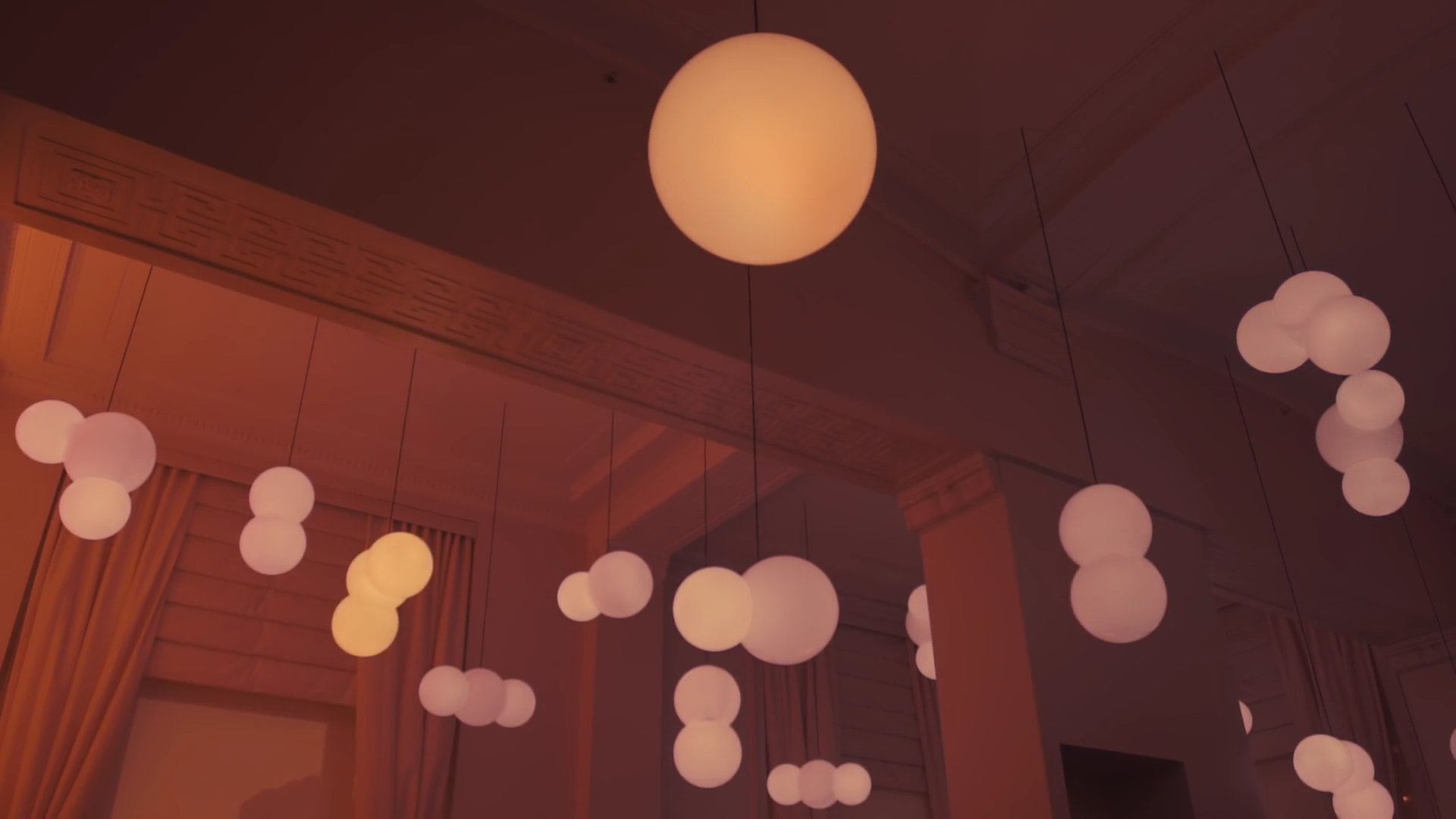
Lexington

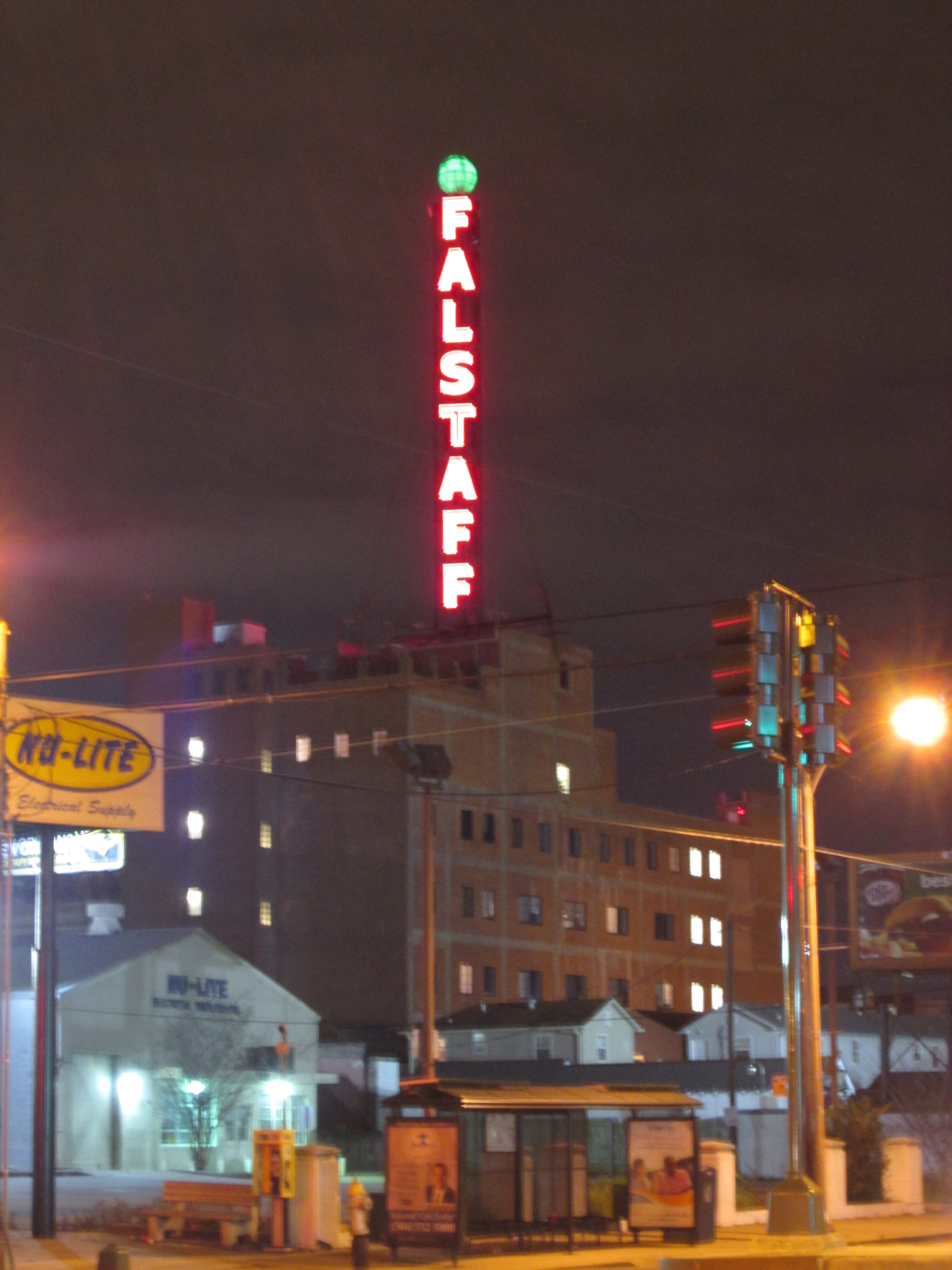
New Orleans

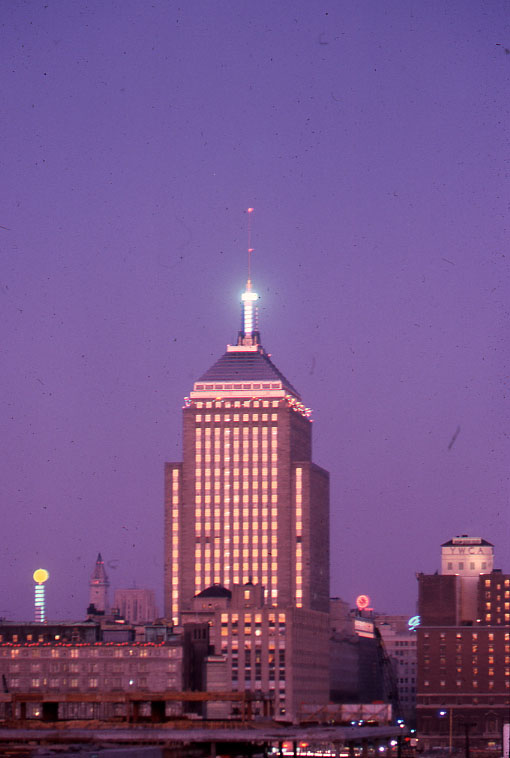
Boston

Flint

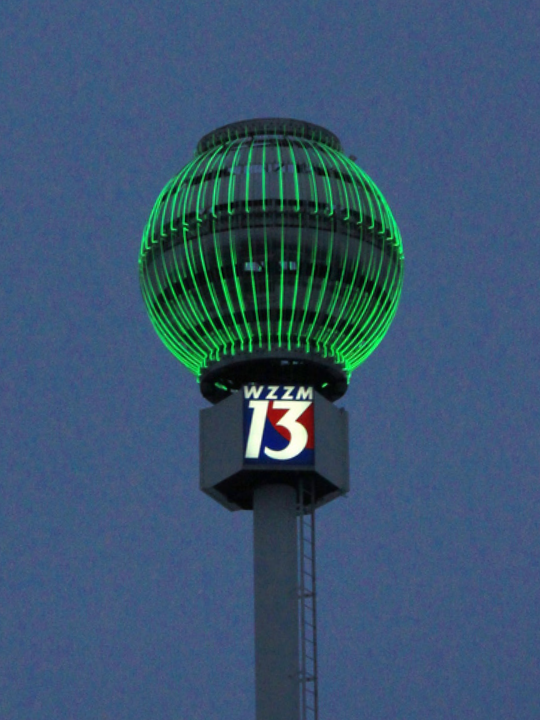
Grand Rapids

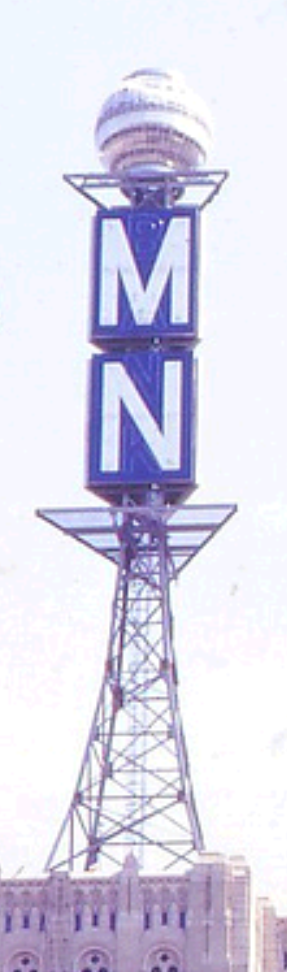
Grand Rapids

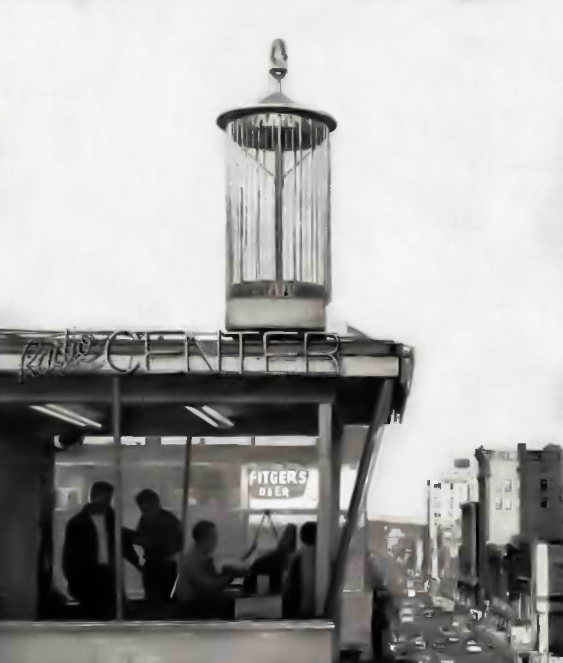
Duluth

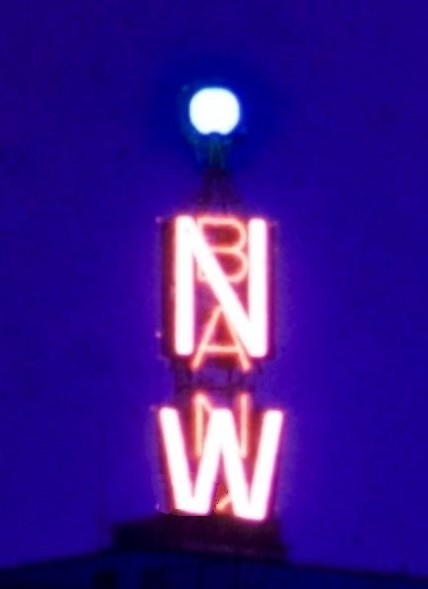
Minneapolis

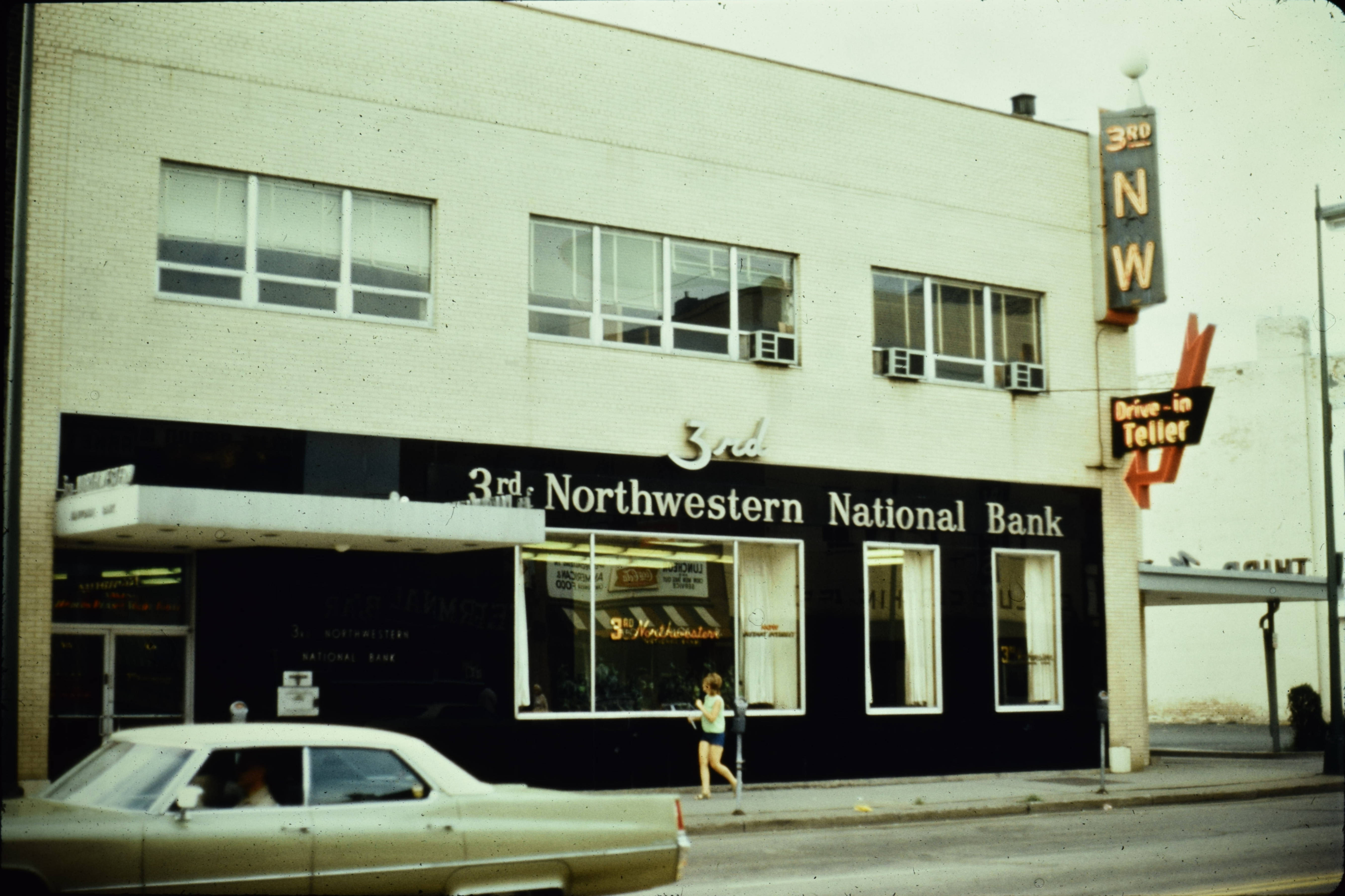
Nicollet Island/East Bank

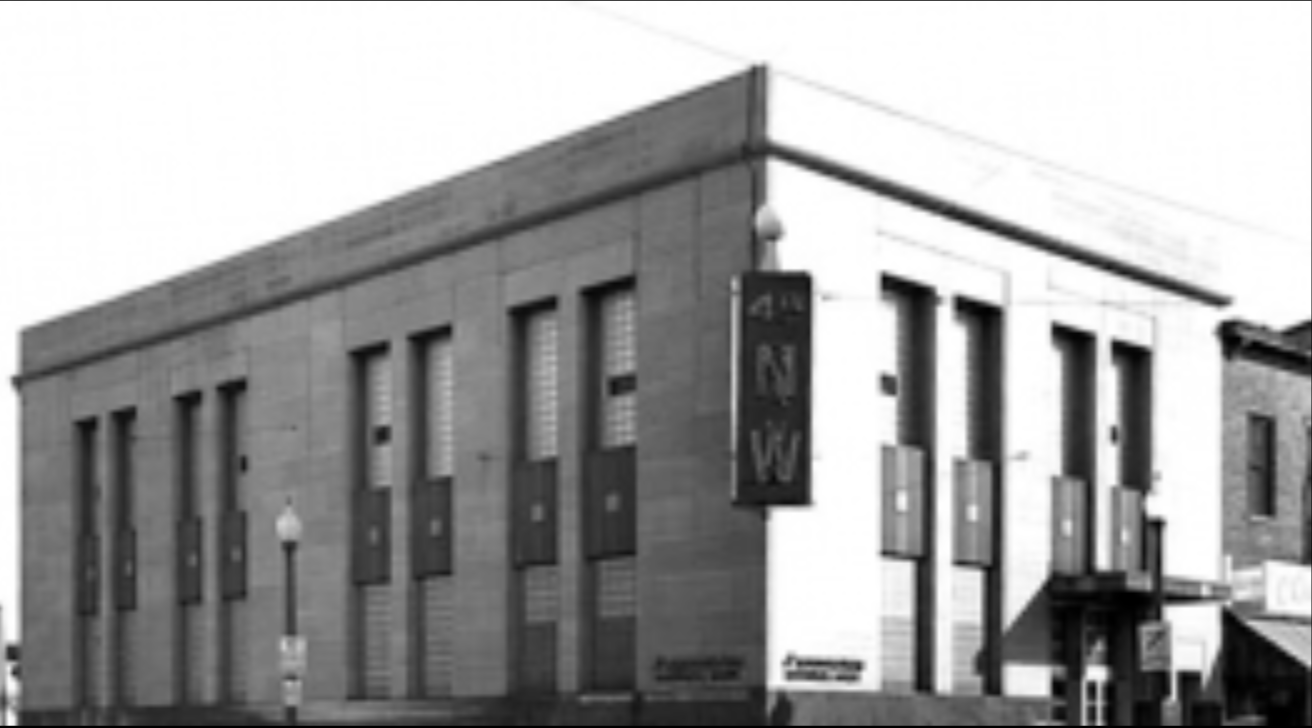
Riverside

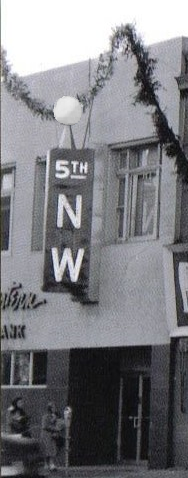
Uptown

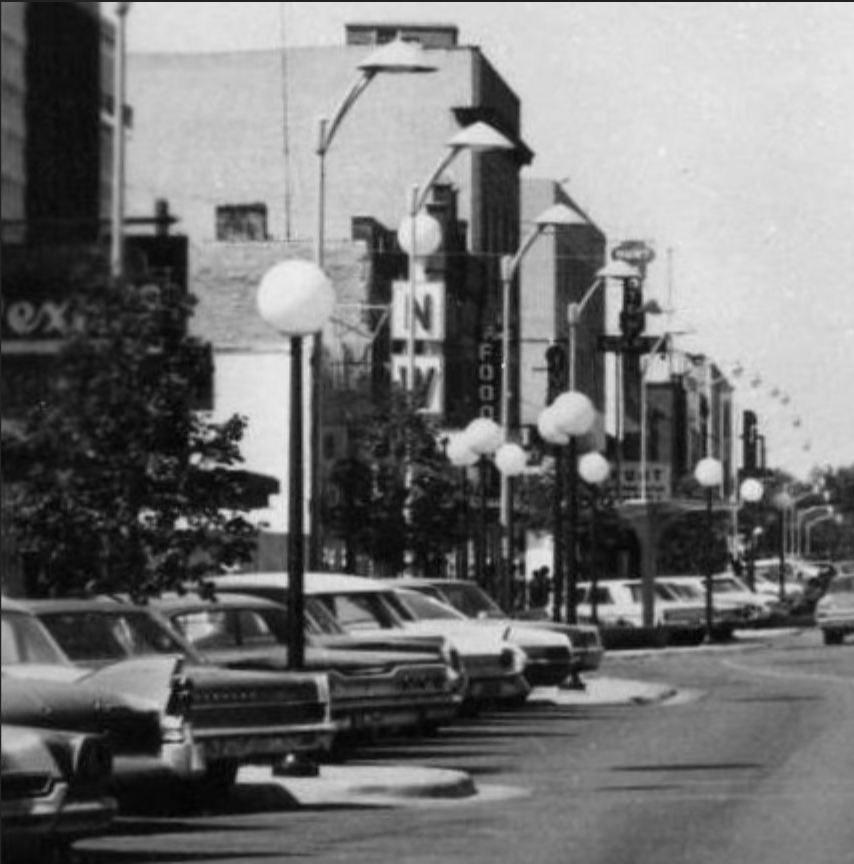
Montevideo

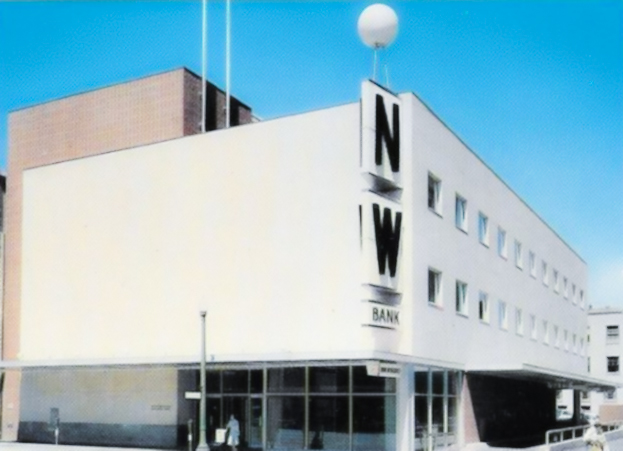
Rochester

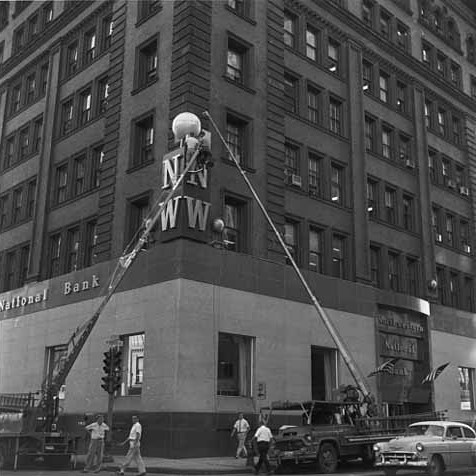
Saint Paul

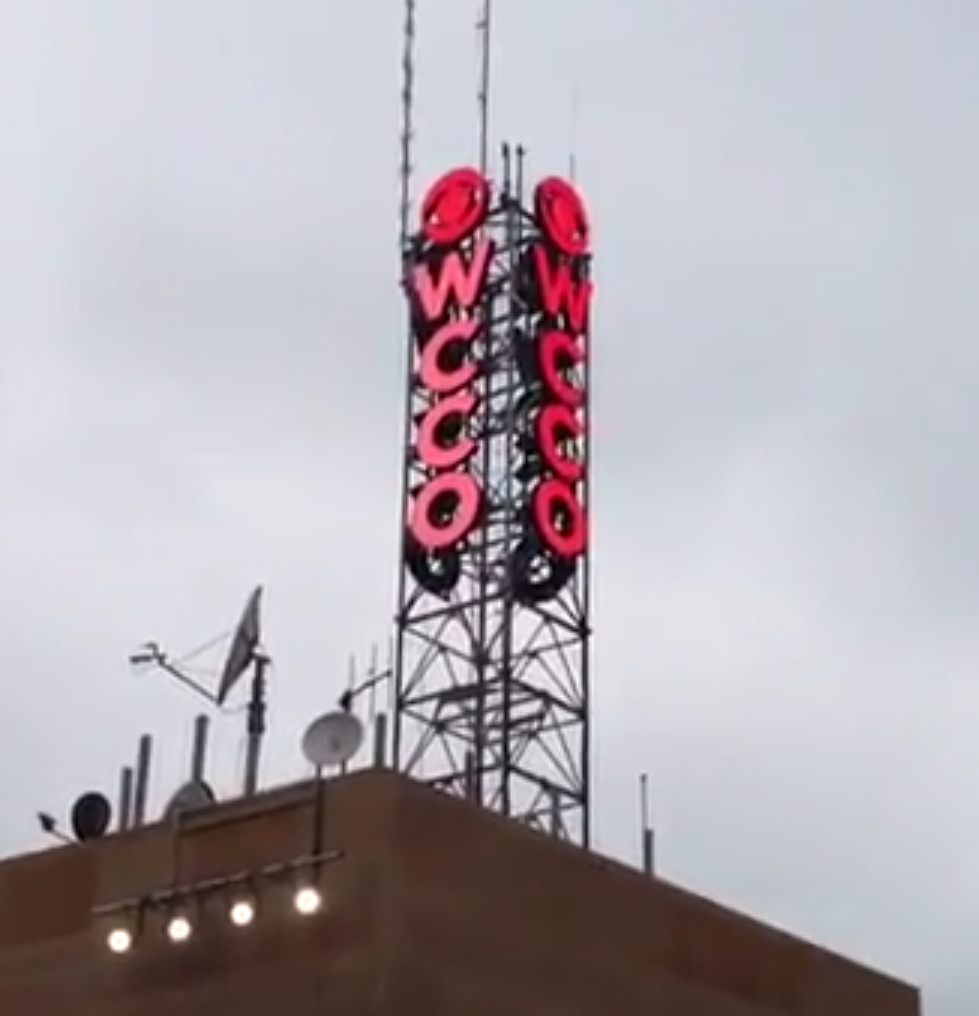
Minneapolis

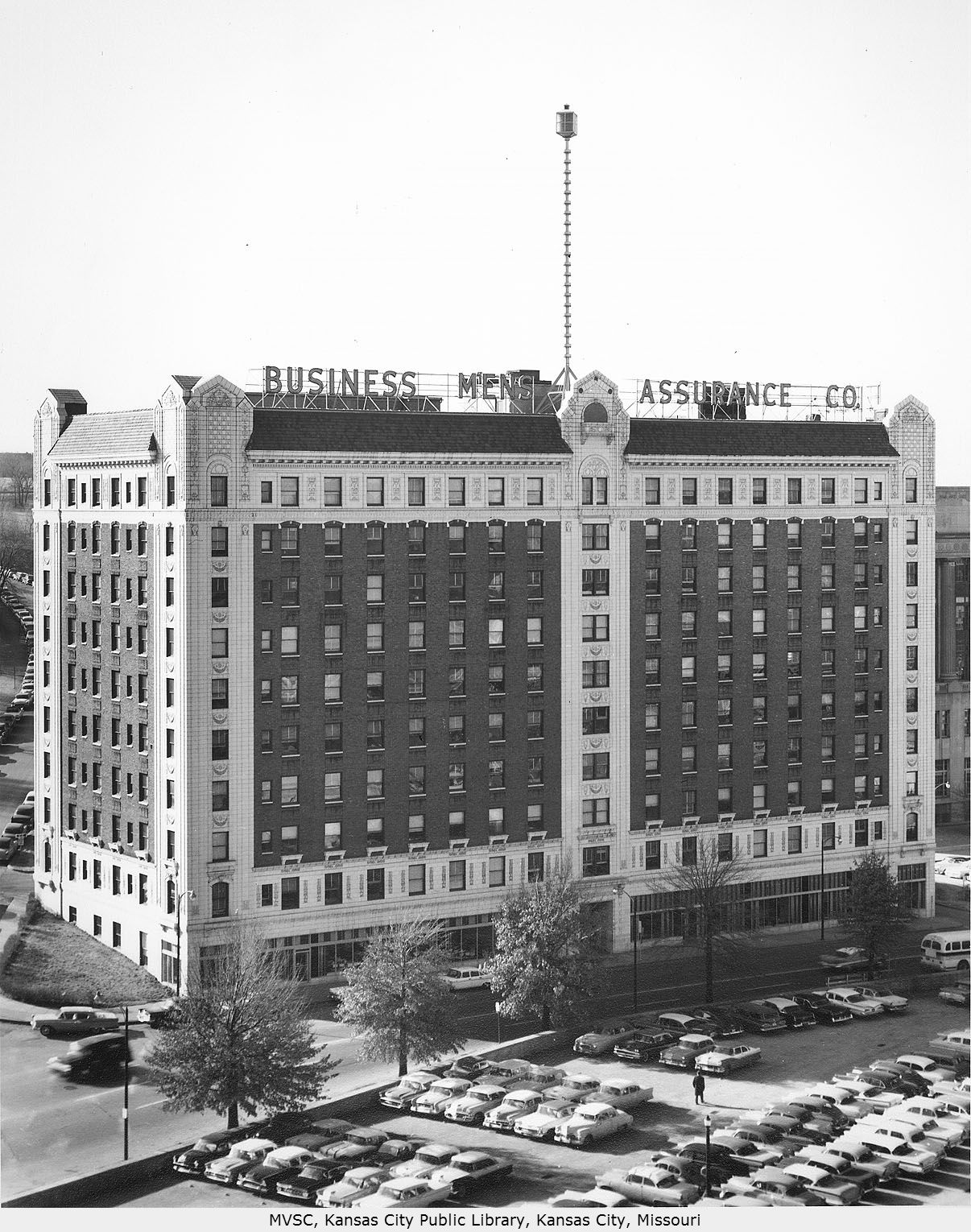
Kansas City

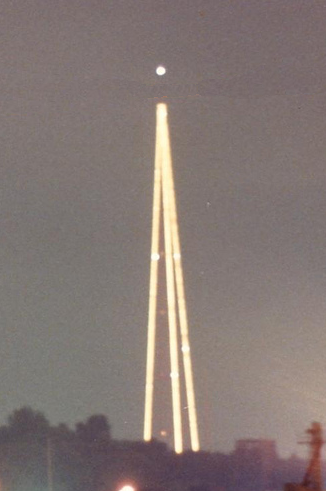
Kansas City

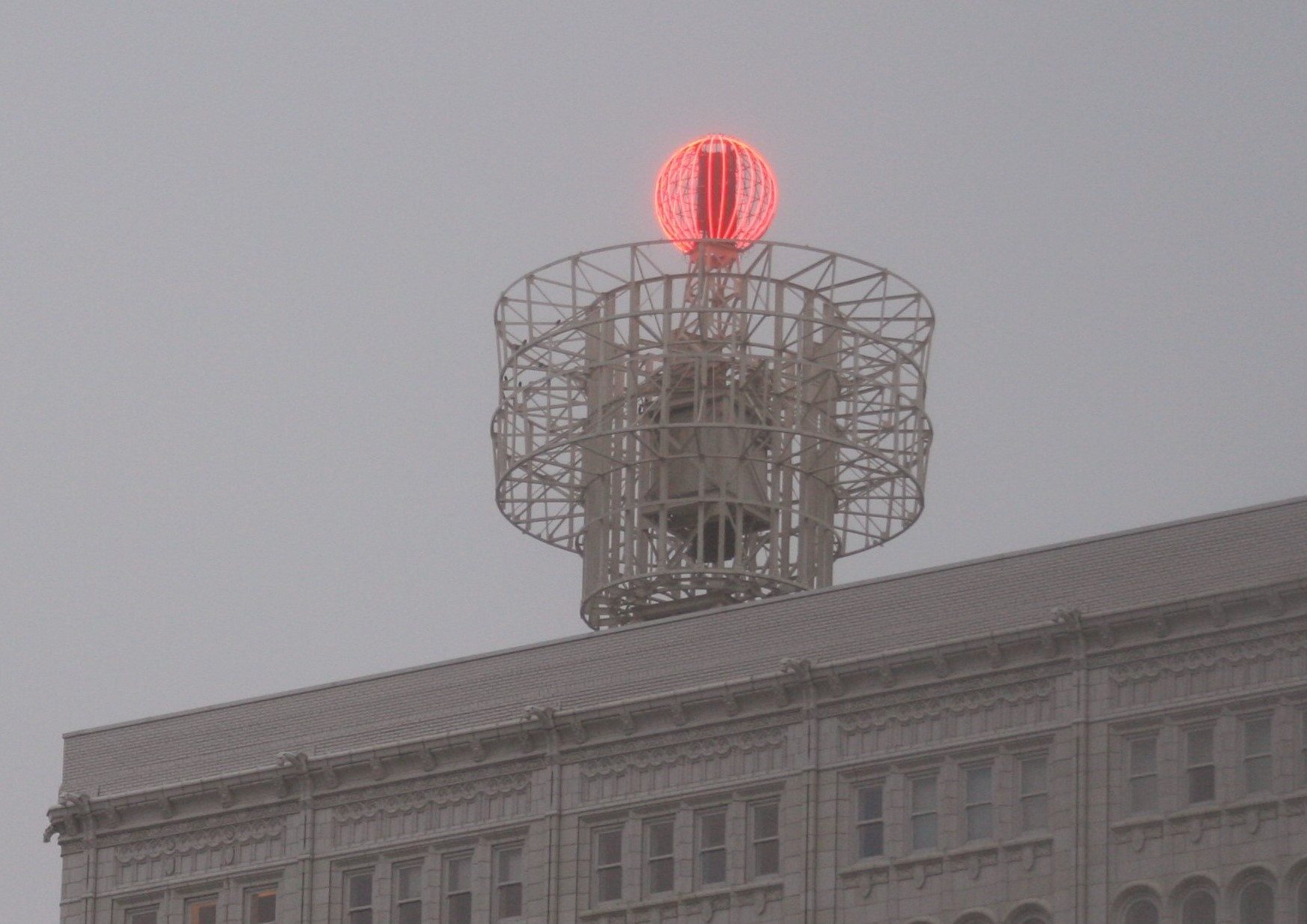
St. Louis

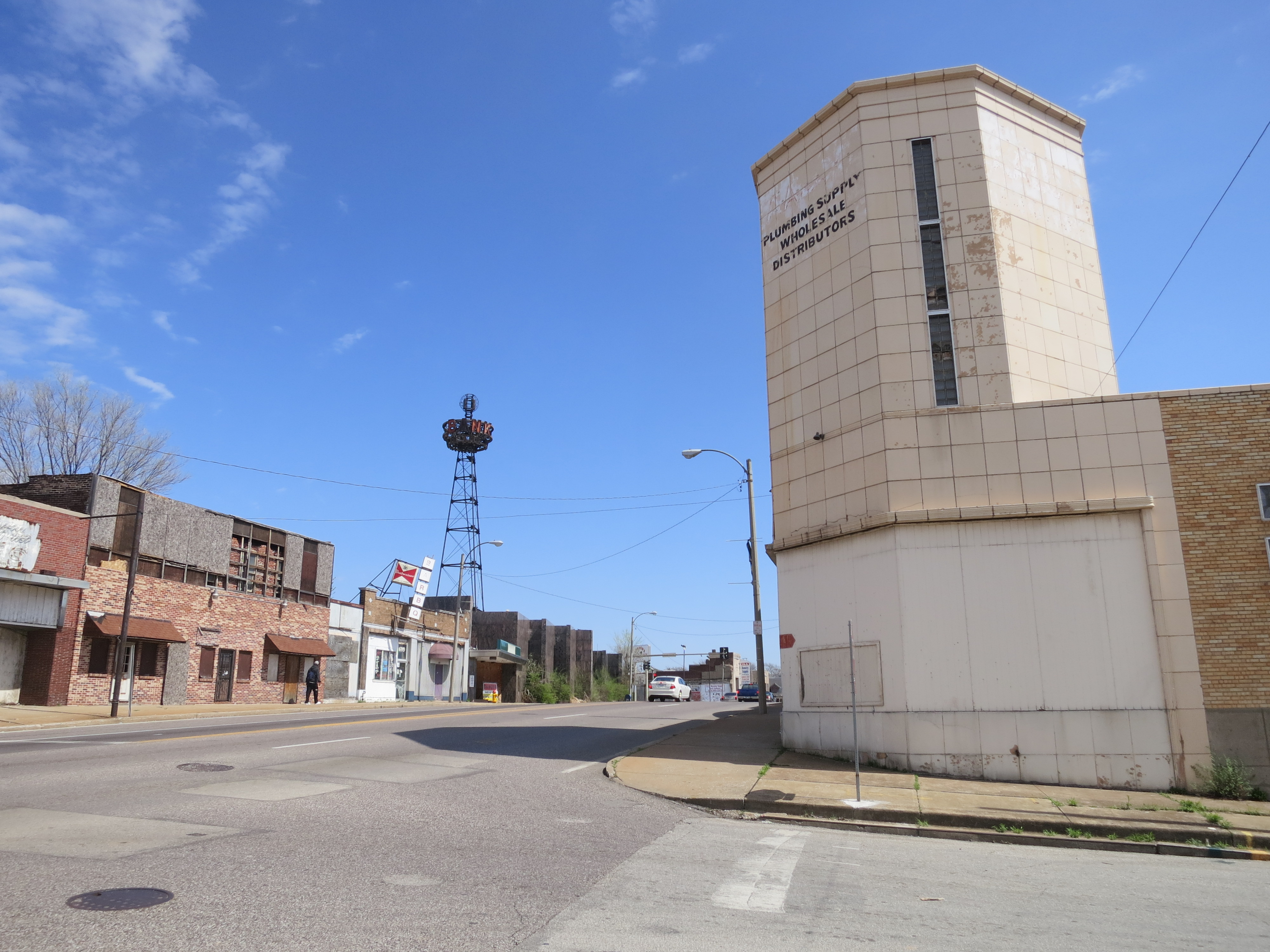
Wellston

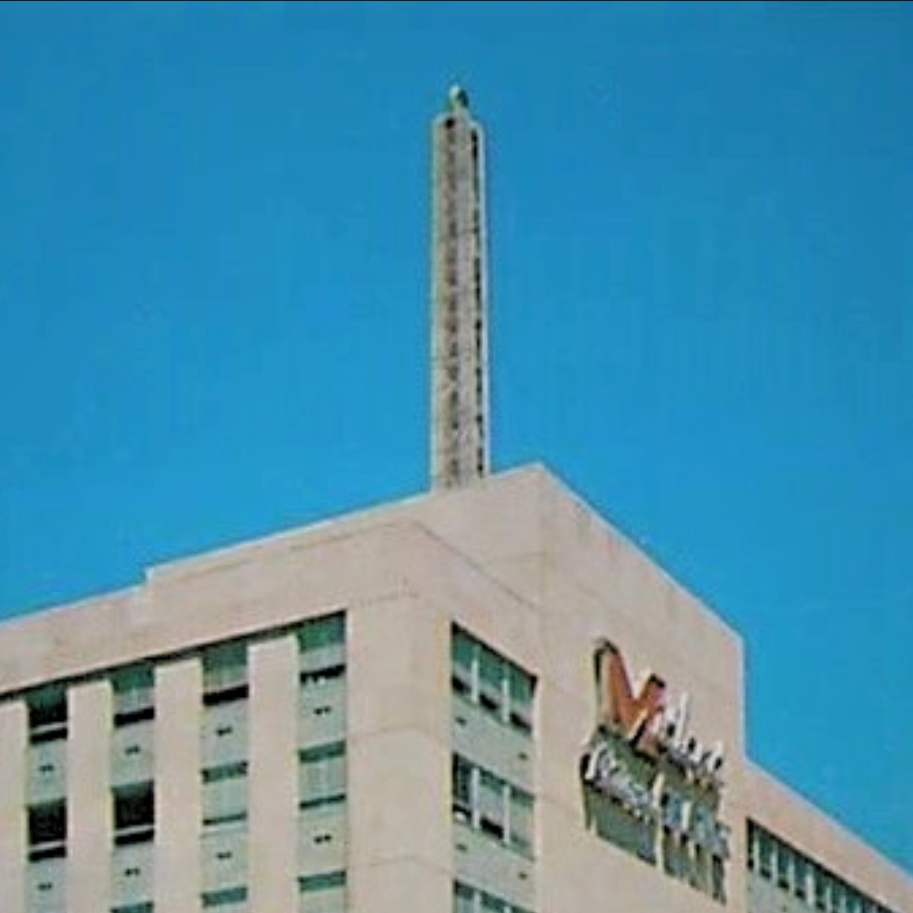
Billings

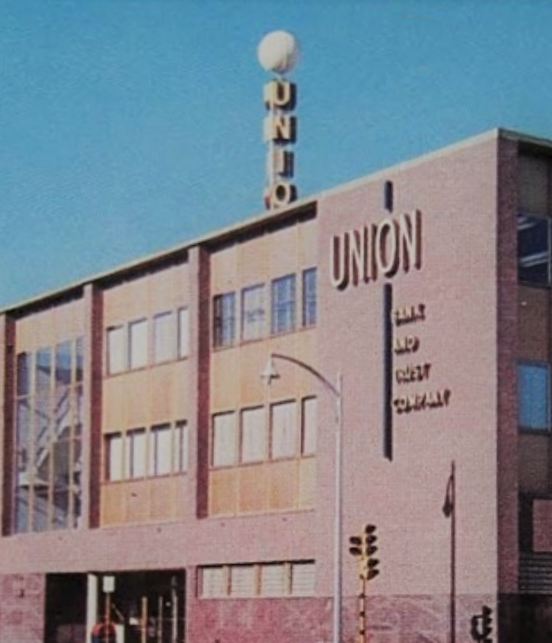
Helena

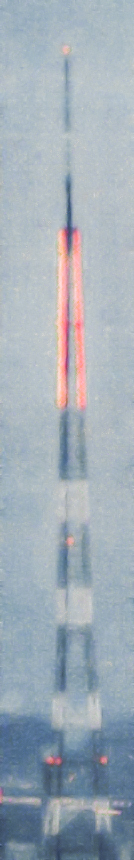
Omaha

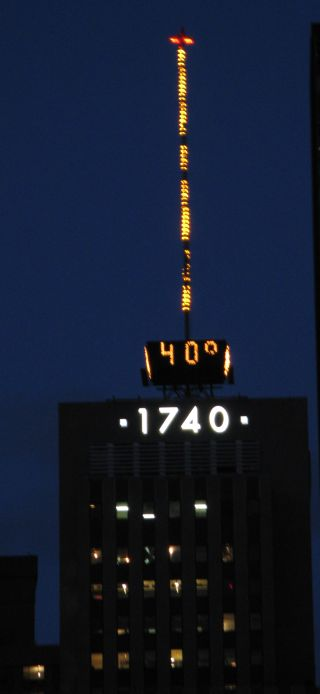
New York City

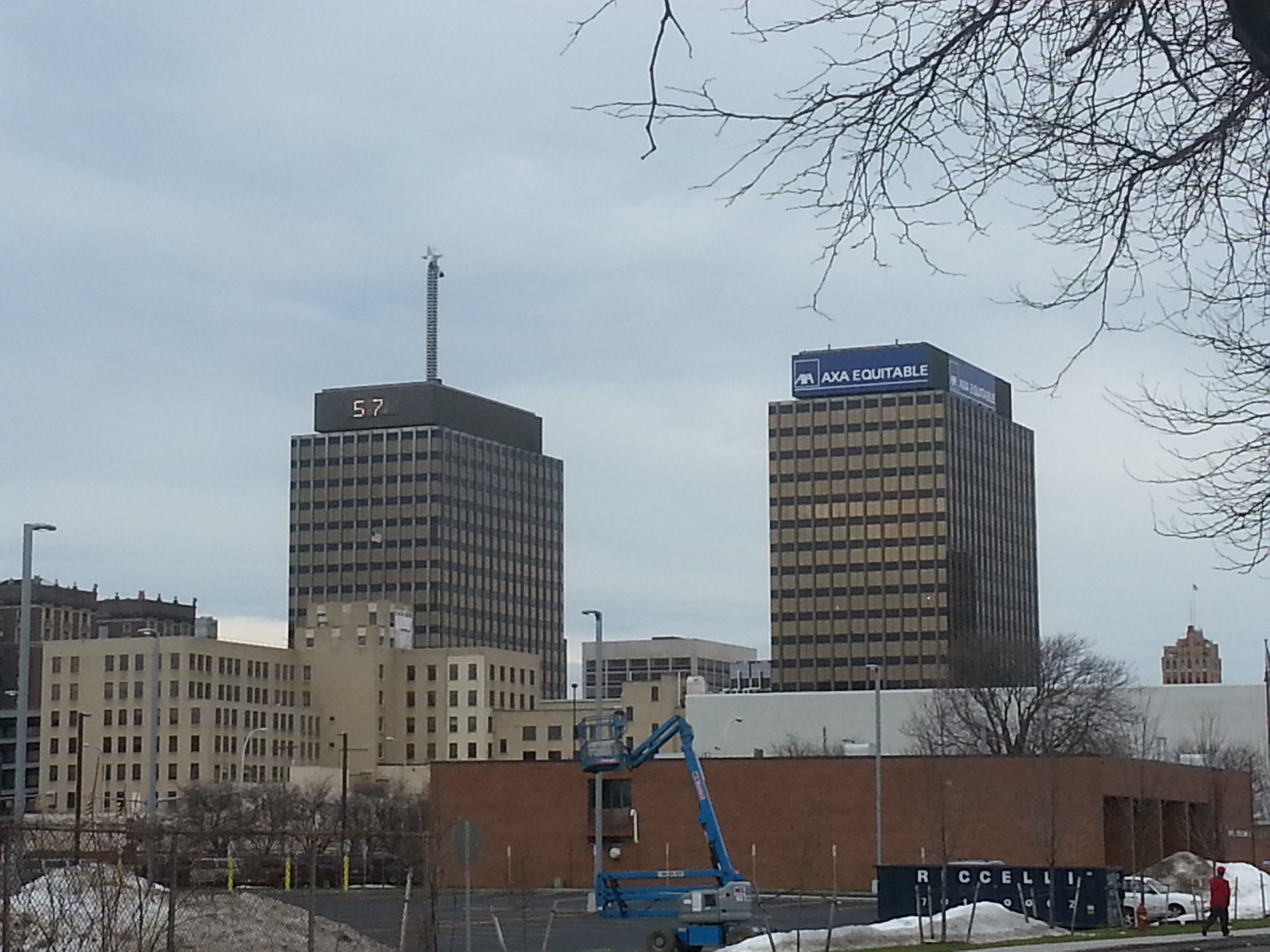
Syracuse

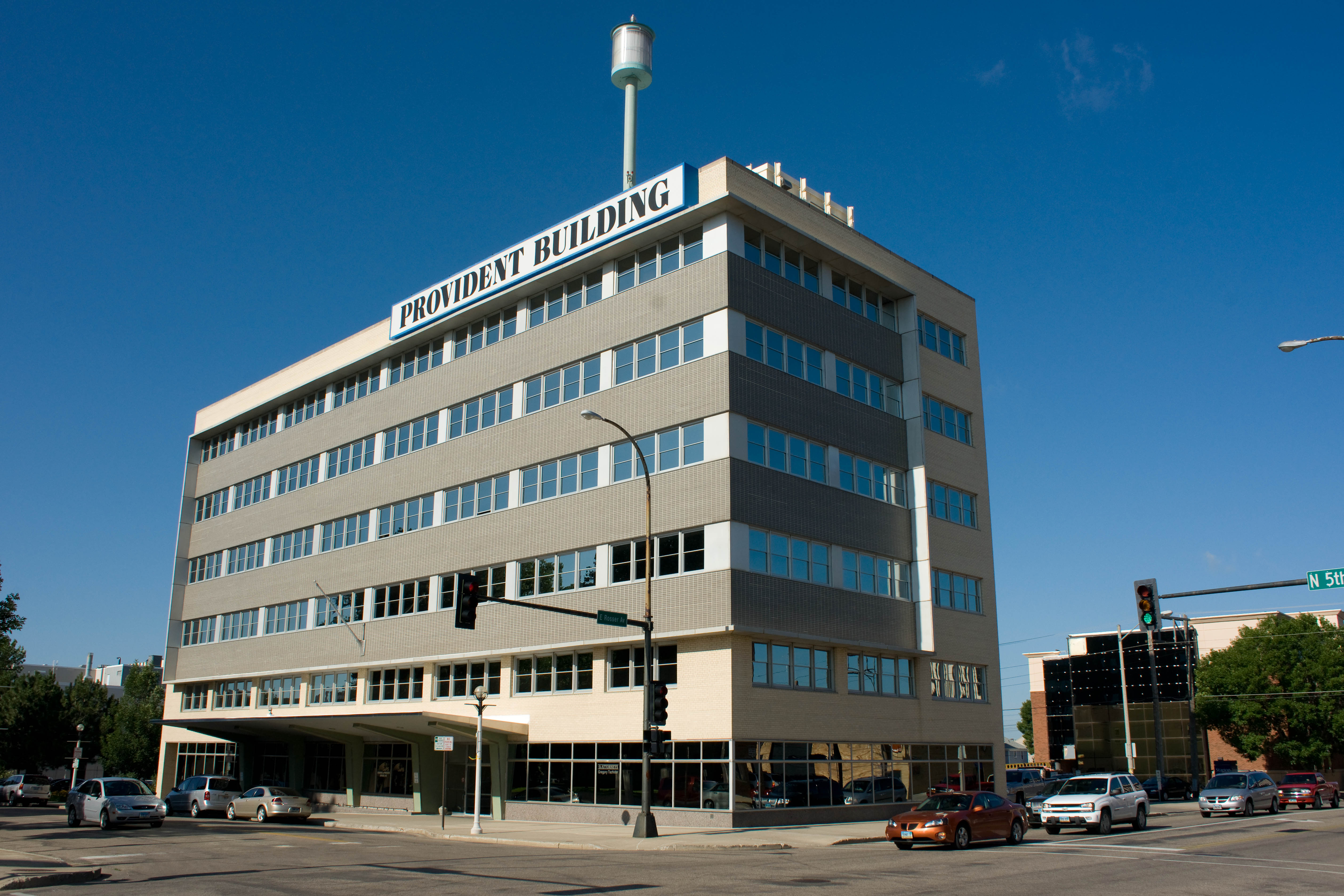
Bismarck

Cincinnati

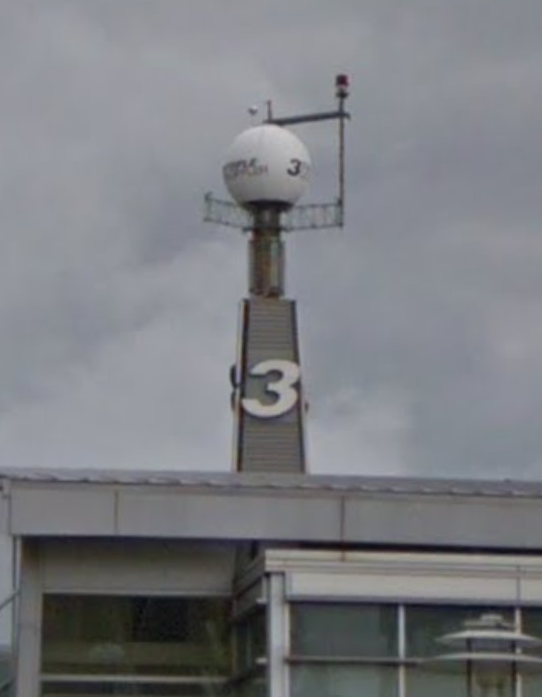
Cleveland

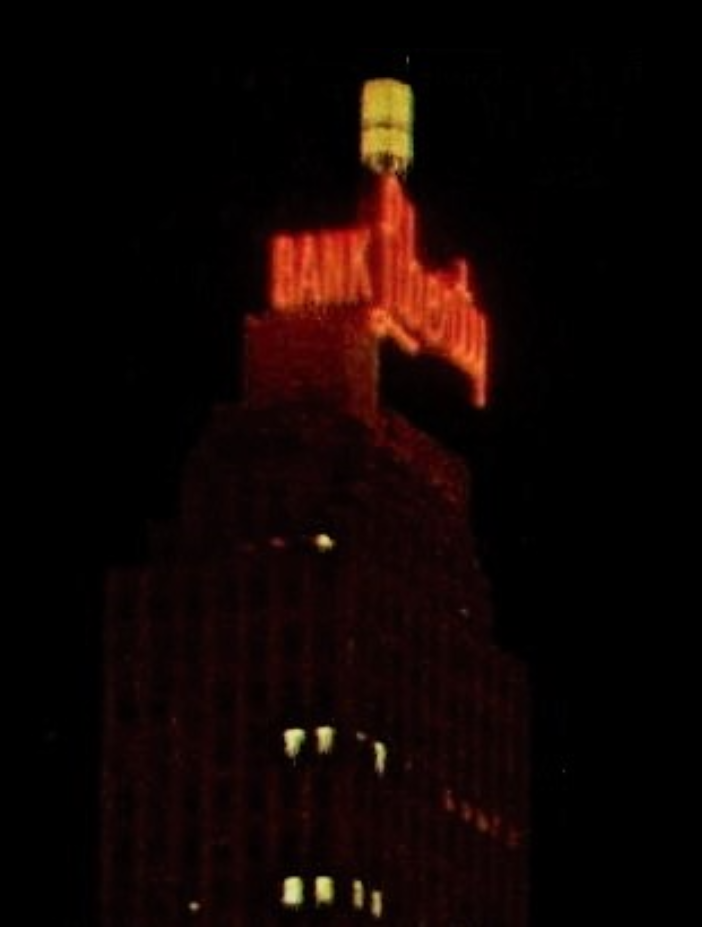
Oklahoma City

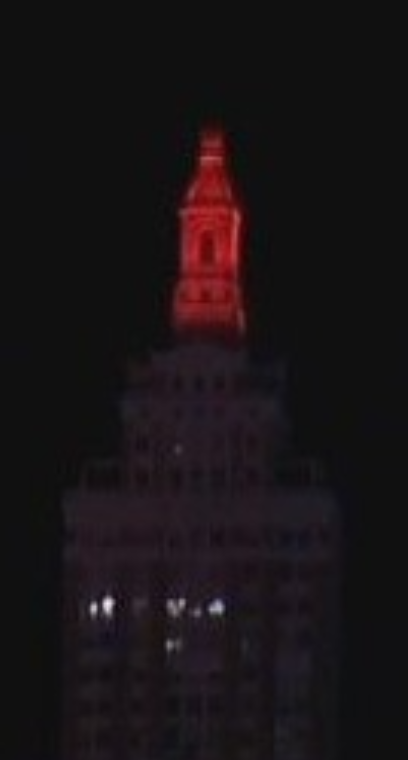
Tulsa

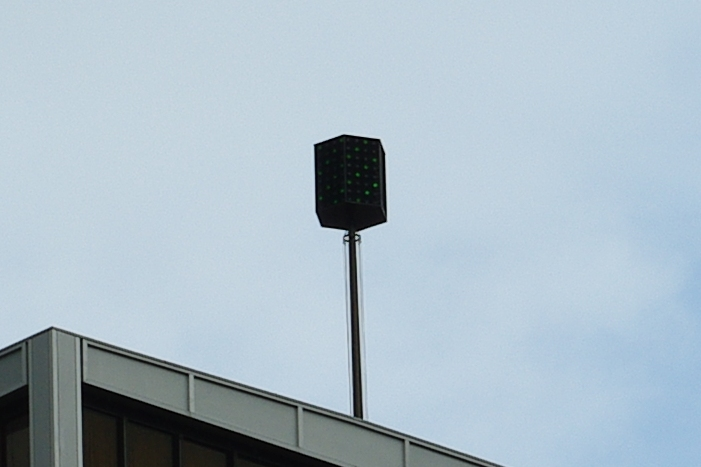
Portland

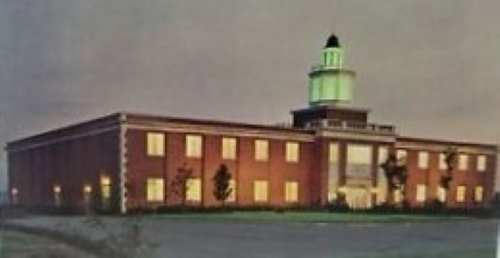
Johnstown

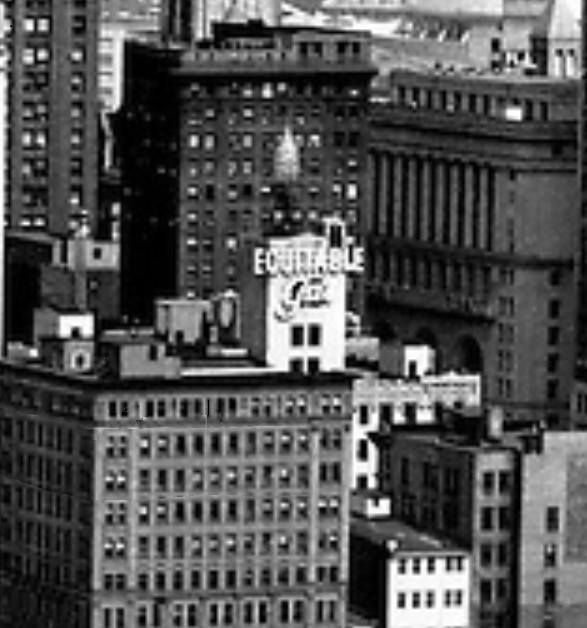
Pittsburgh

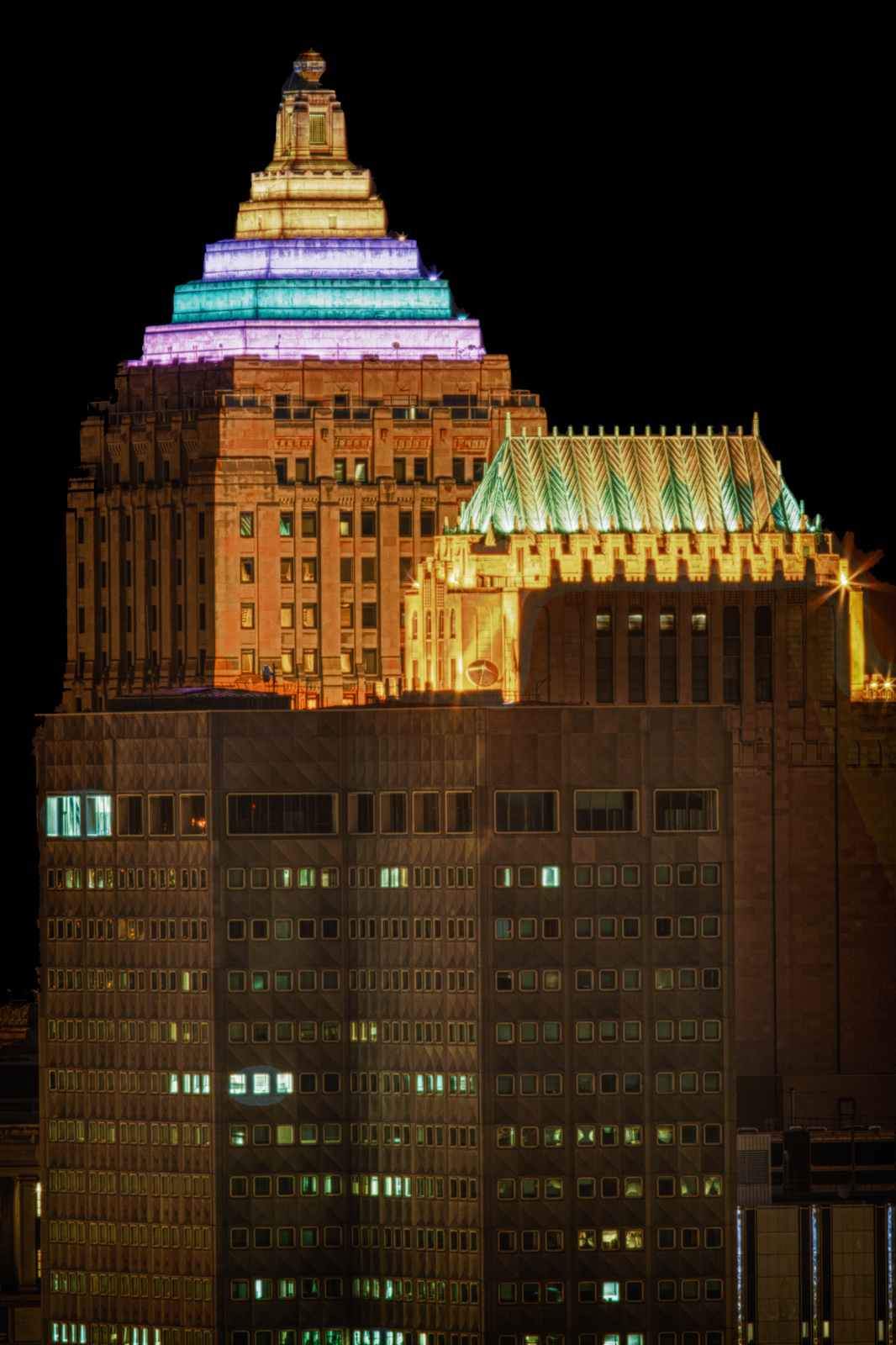
Pittsburgh

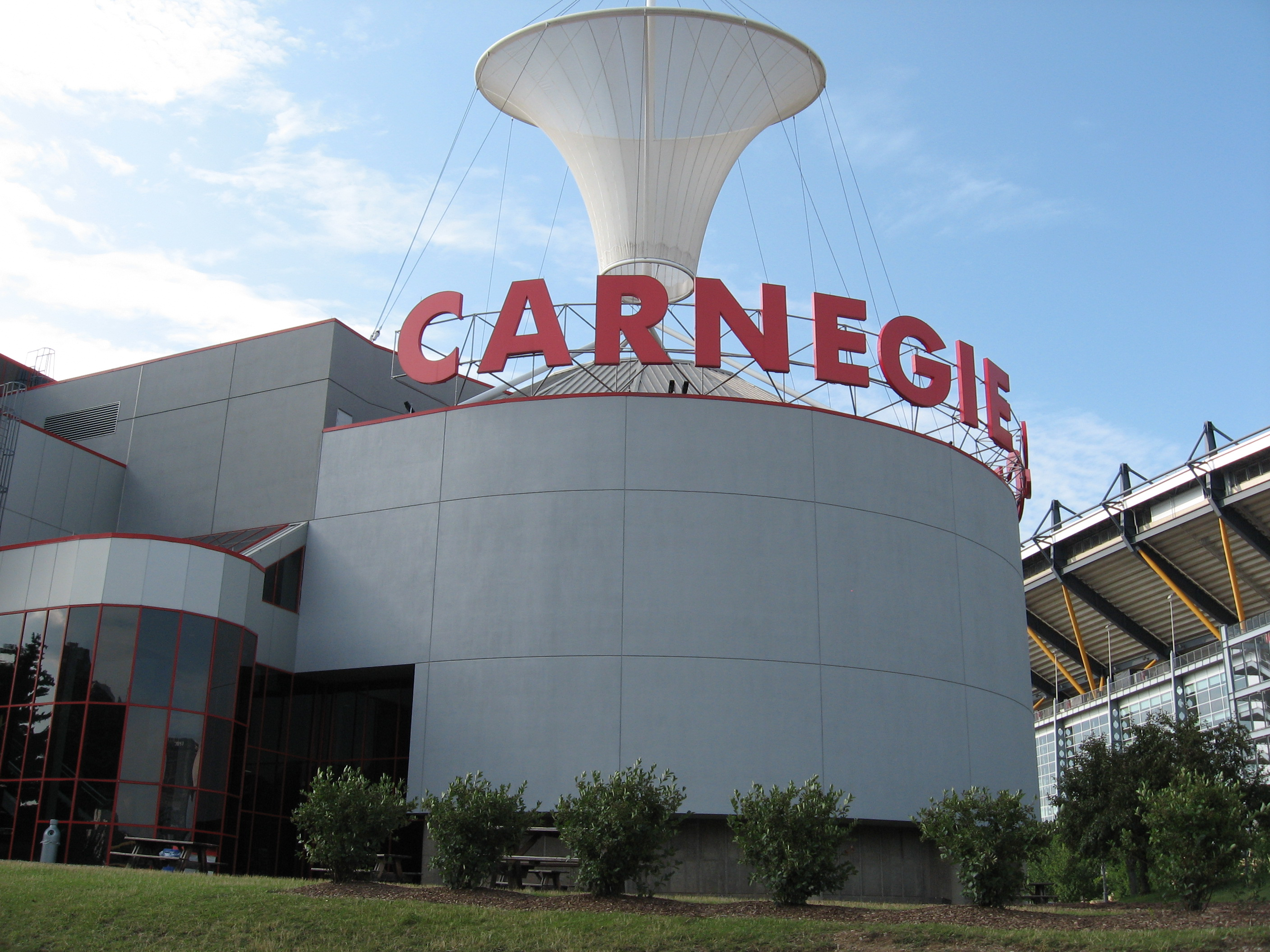
Pittsburgh

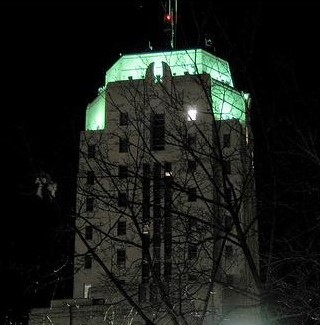
Reading

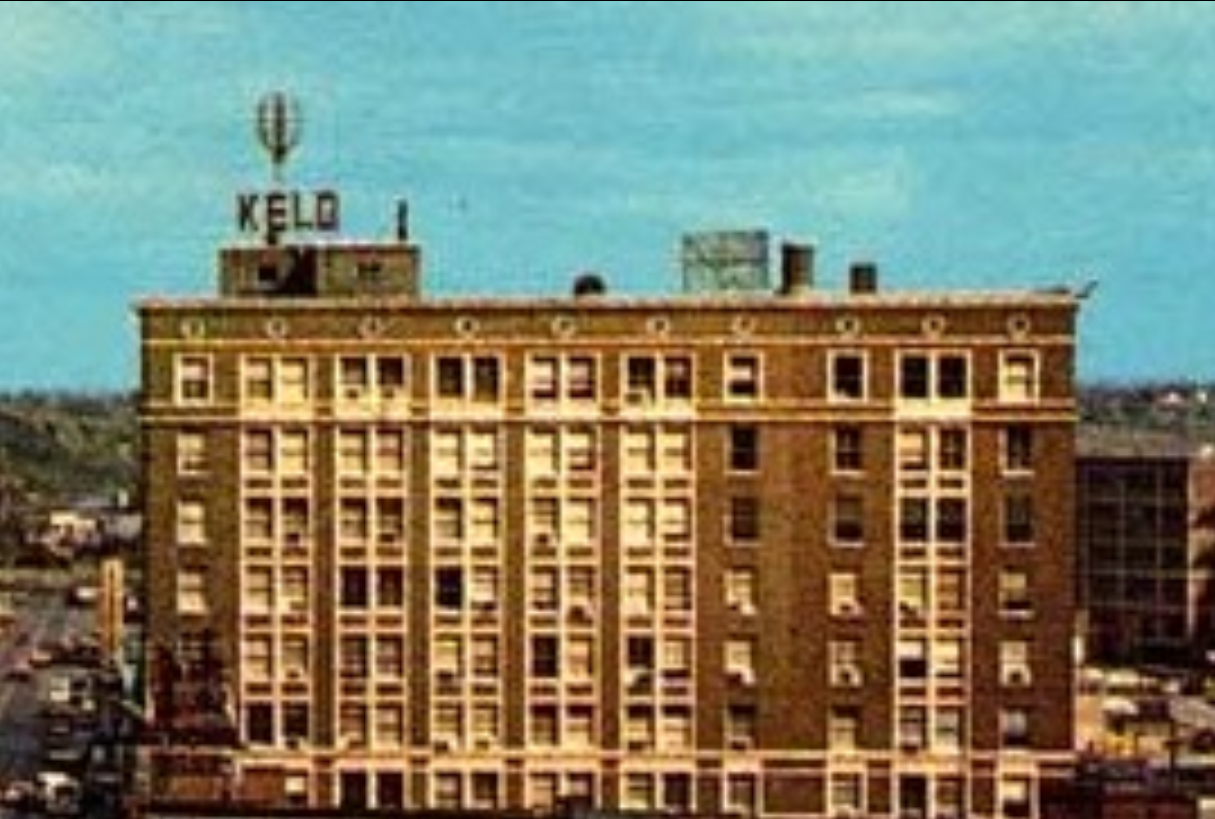
Sioux Falls

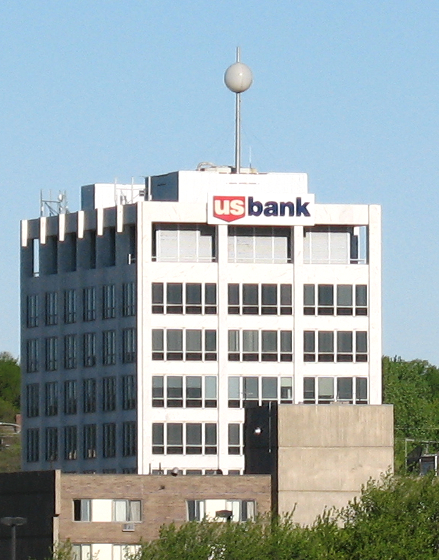
Sioux Falls

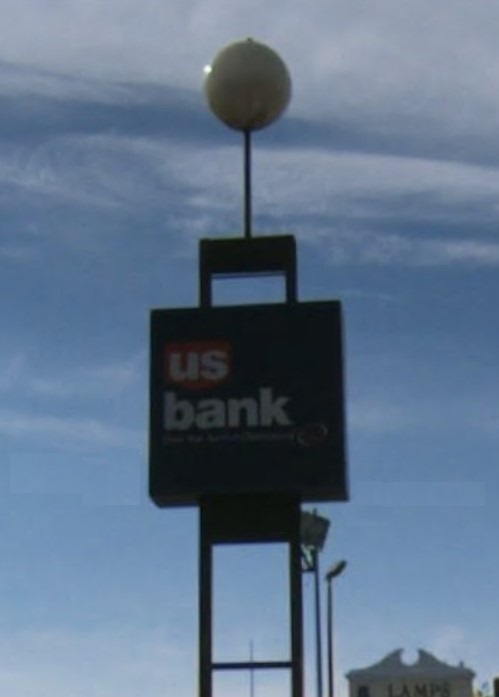
Sioux Falls

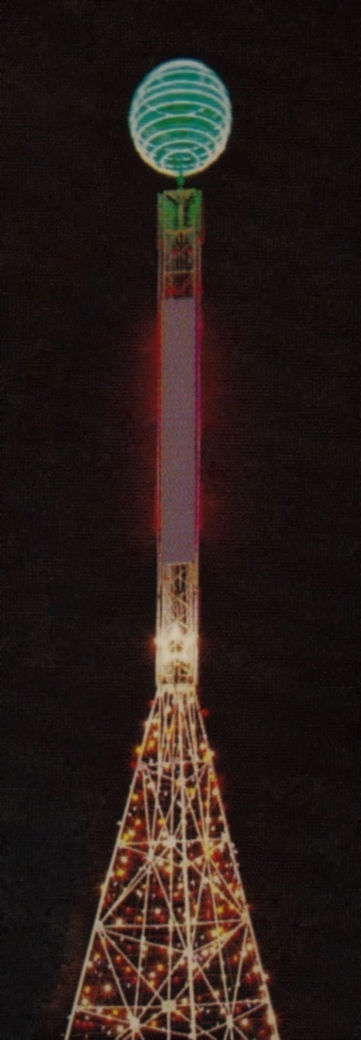
Watertown

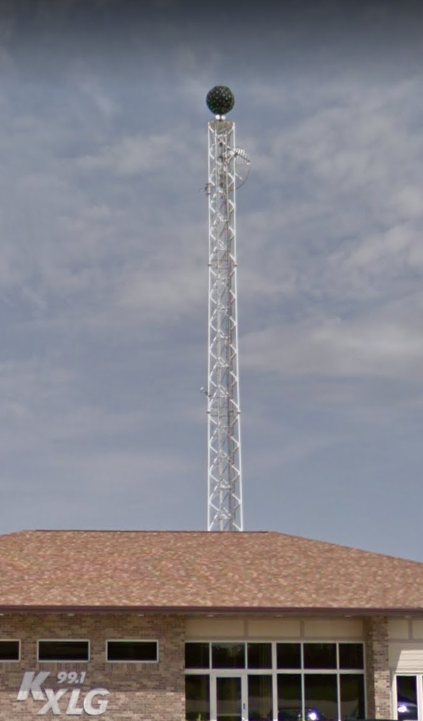
Watertown

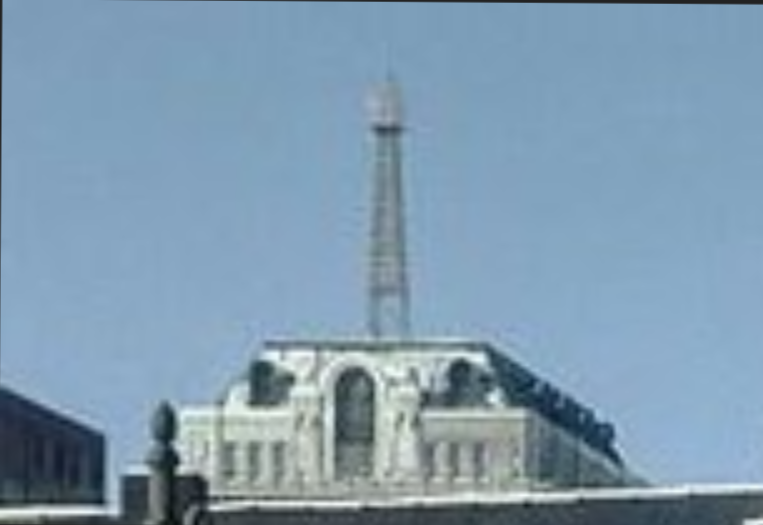
Chattanooga

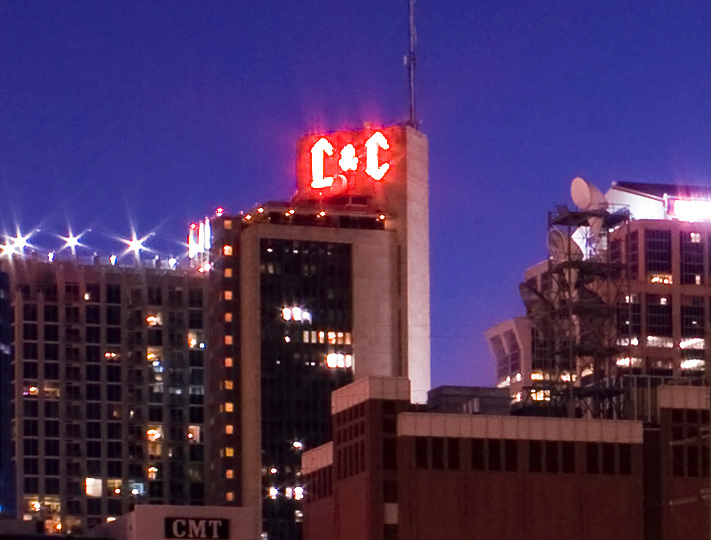
Nashville

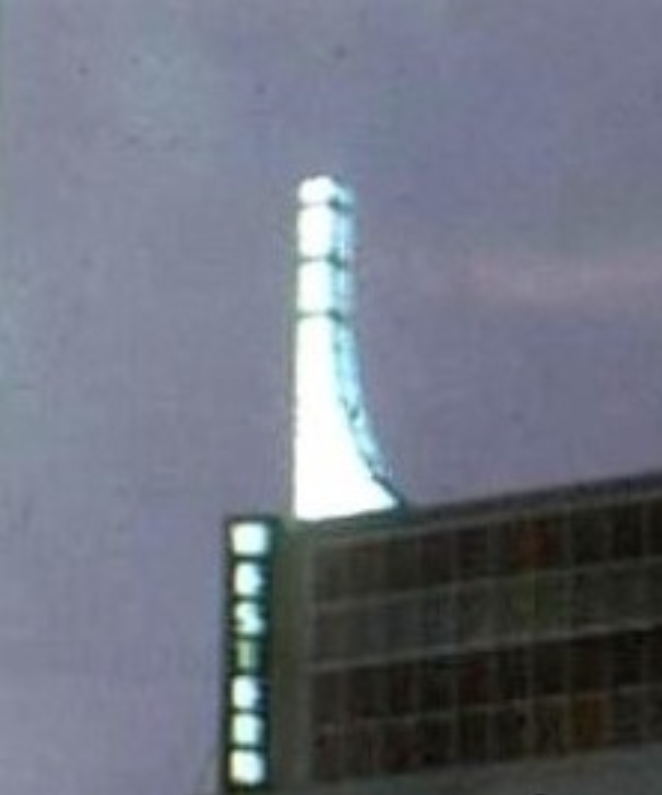
Amarillo

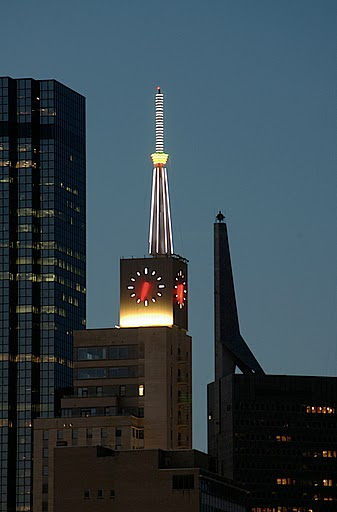
Dallas

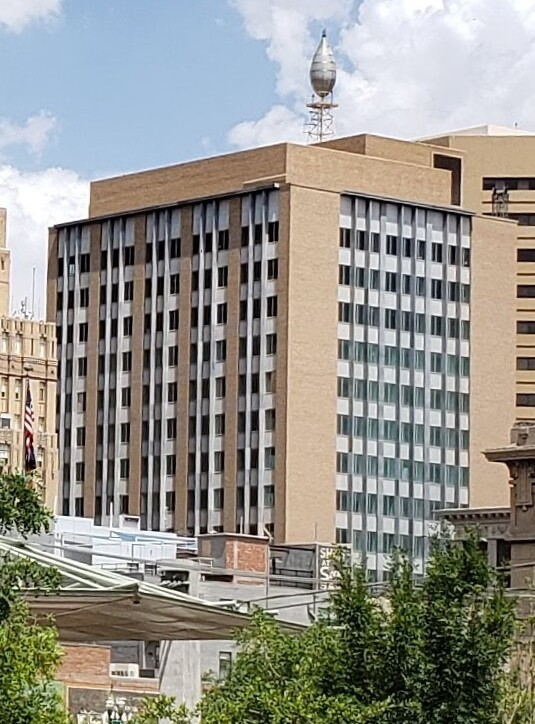
El Paso

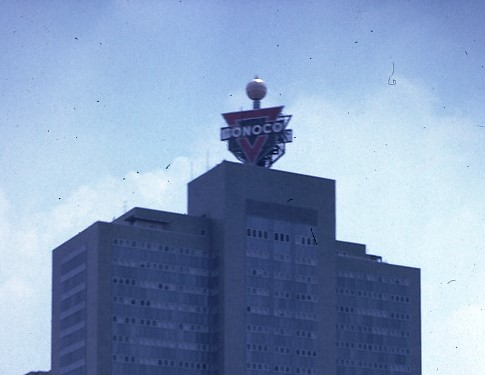
Houston

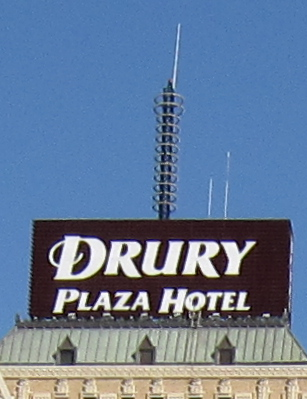
San Antonio

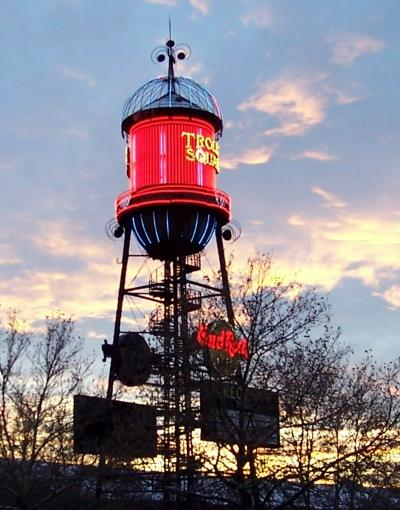
Salt Lake City

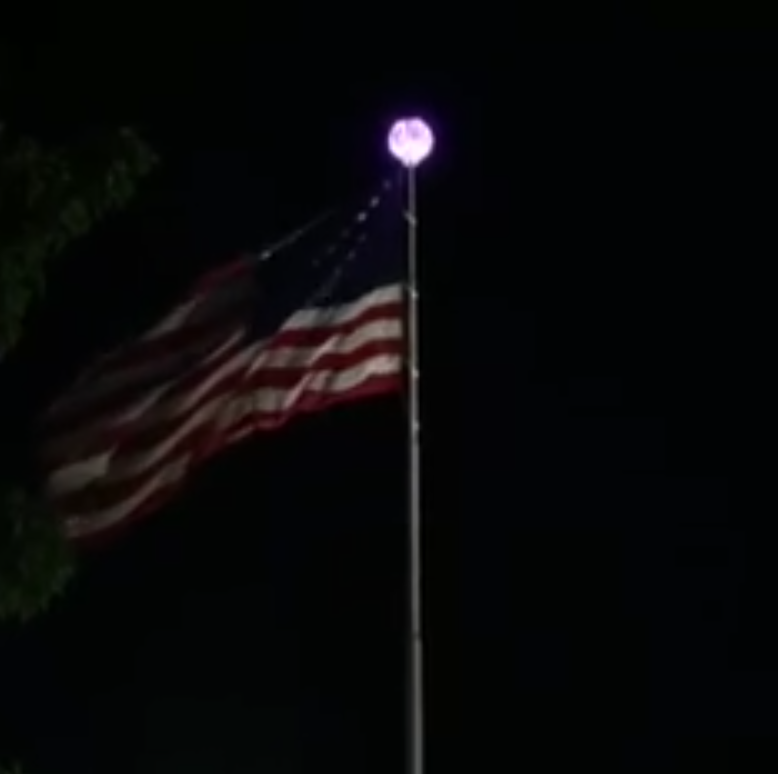
Salt Lake City

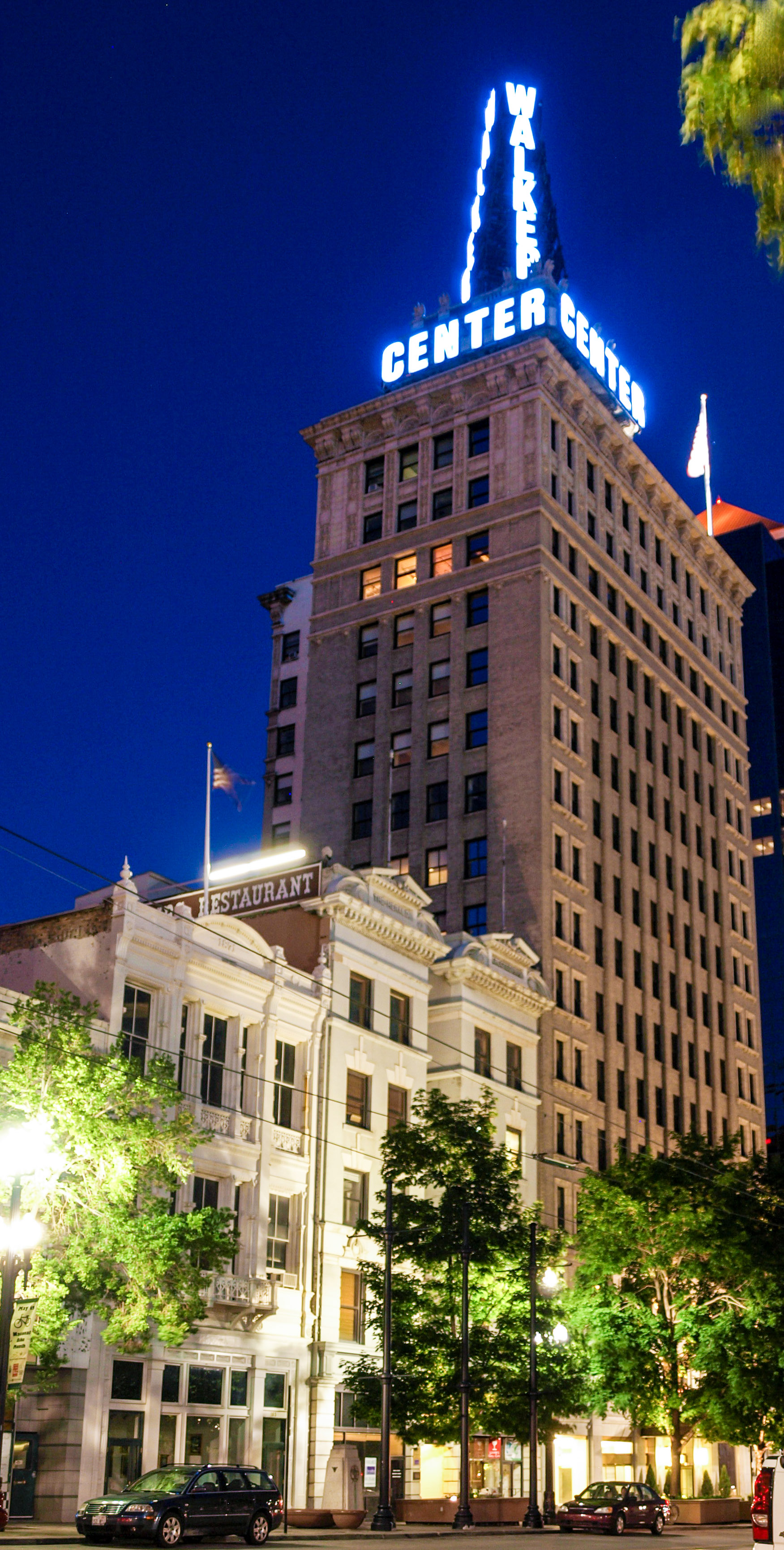
Salt Lake City

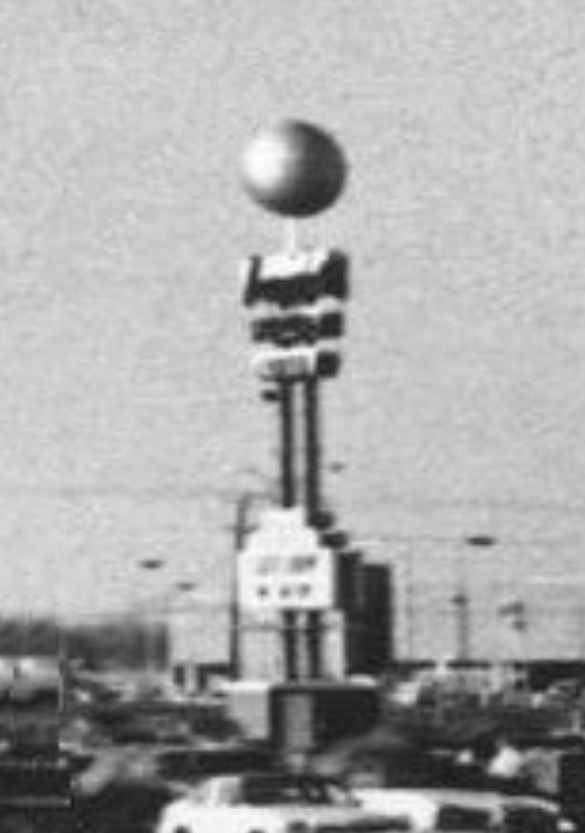
Newport News

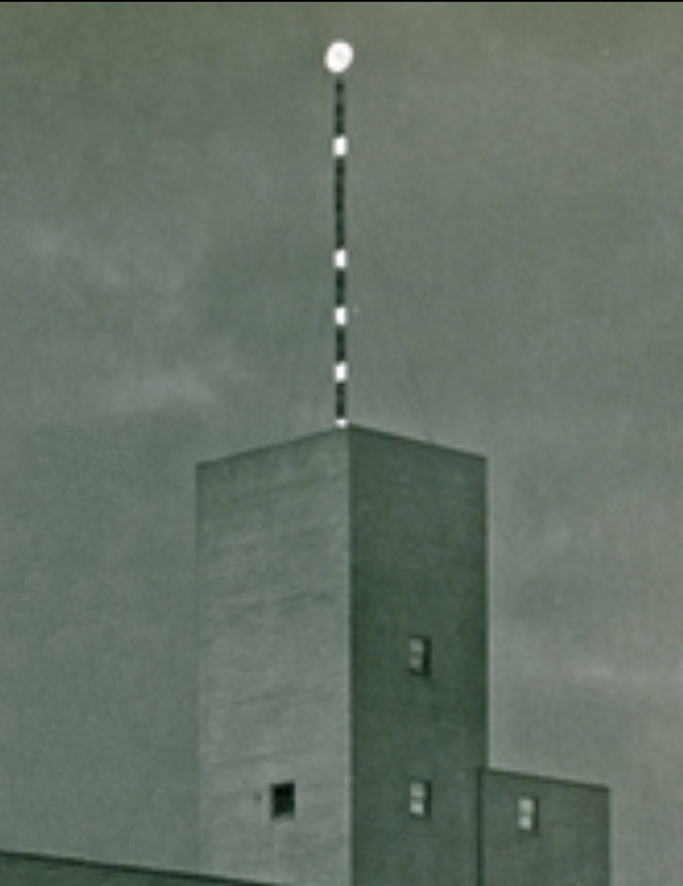
Green Bay

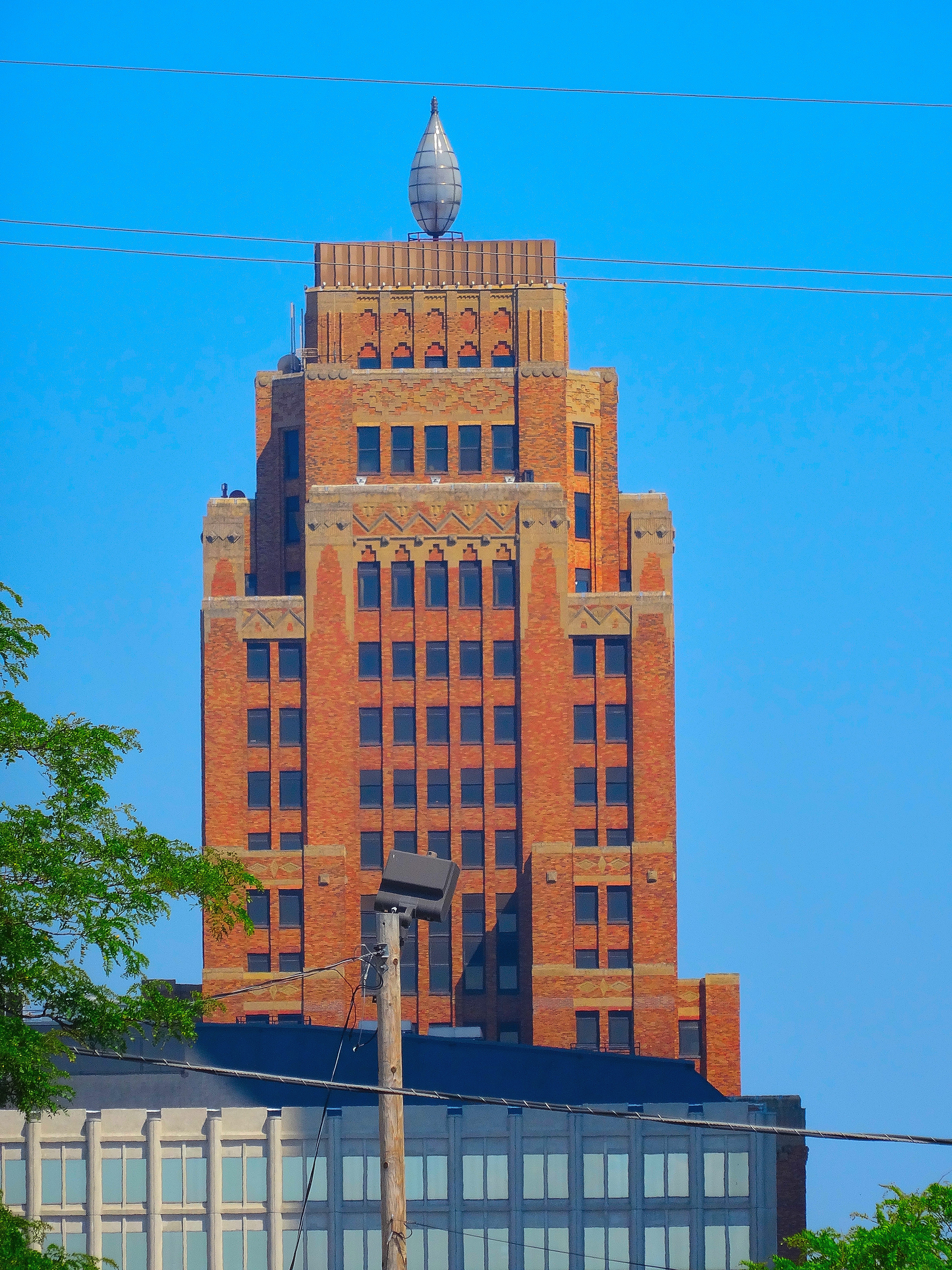
Milwaukee

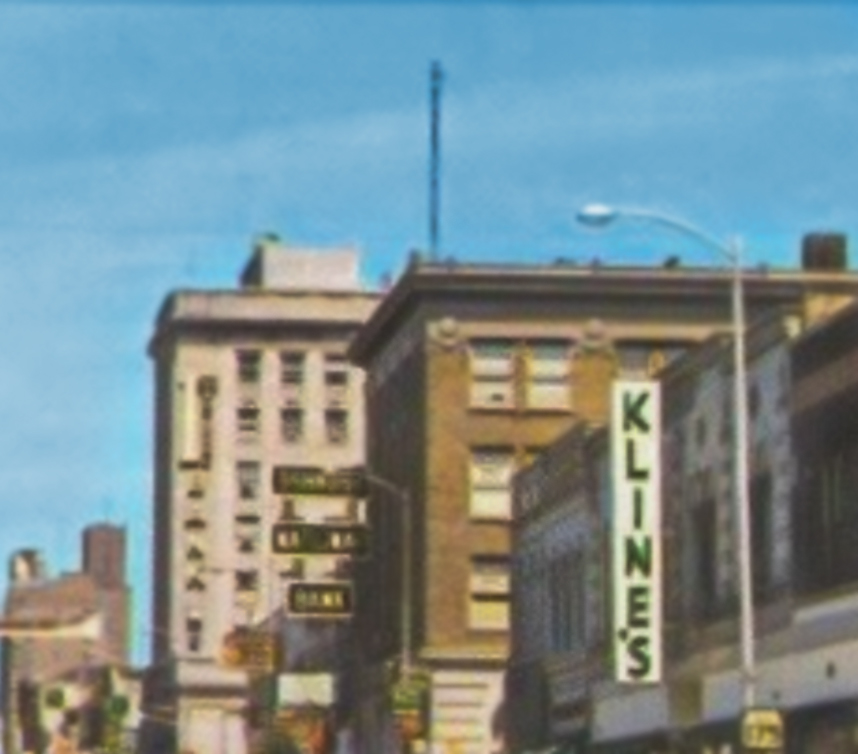
Oshkosh

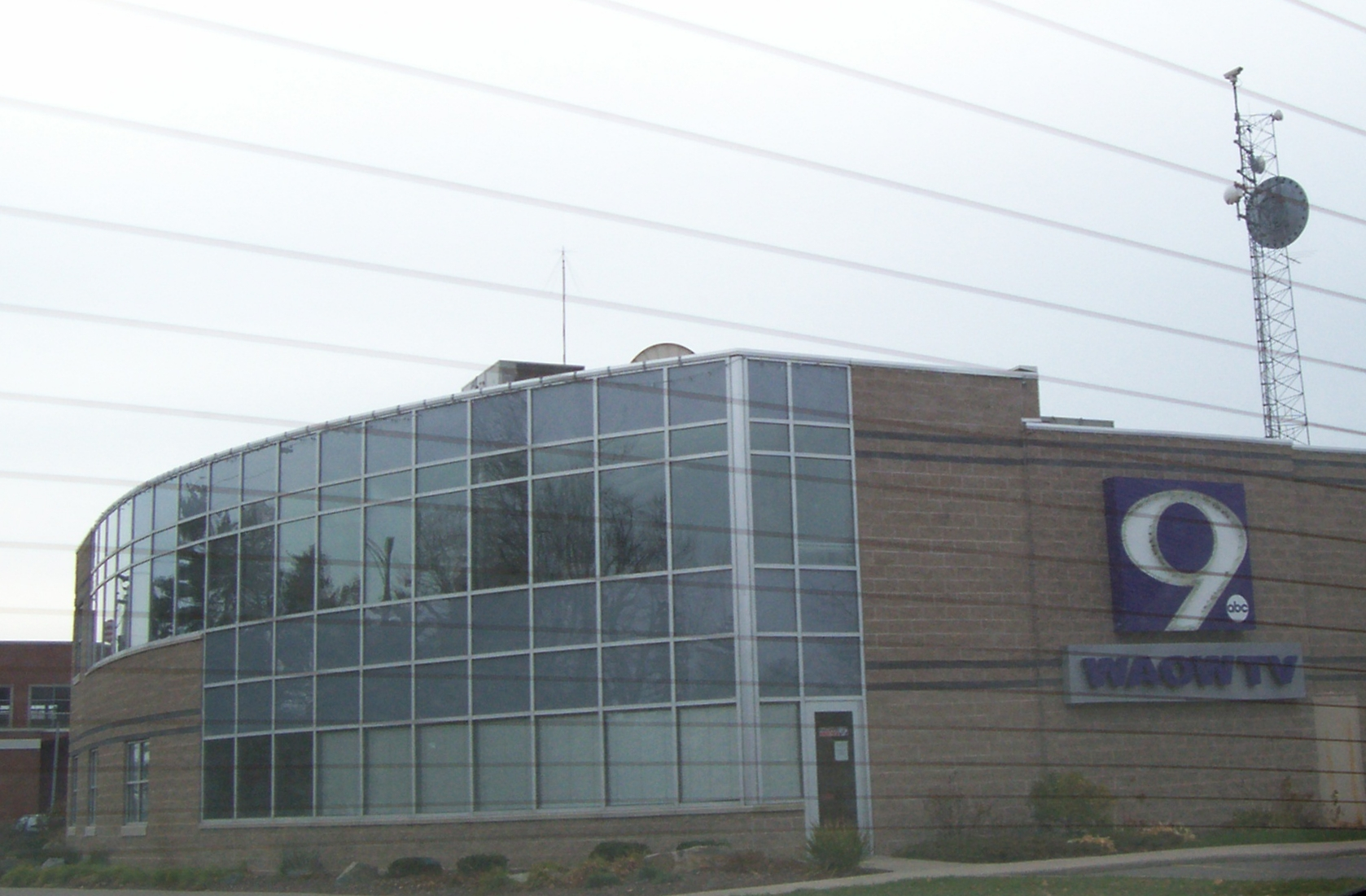
Wausau
