= Parc du Petit Prince =

Theme park in France

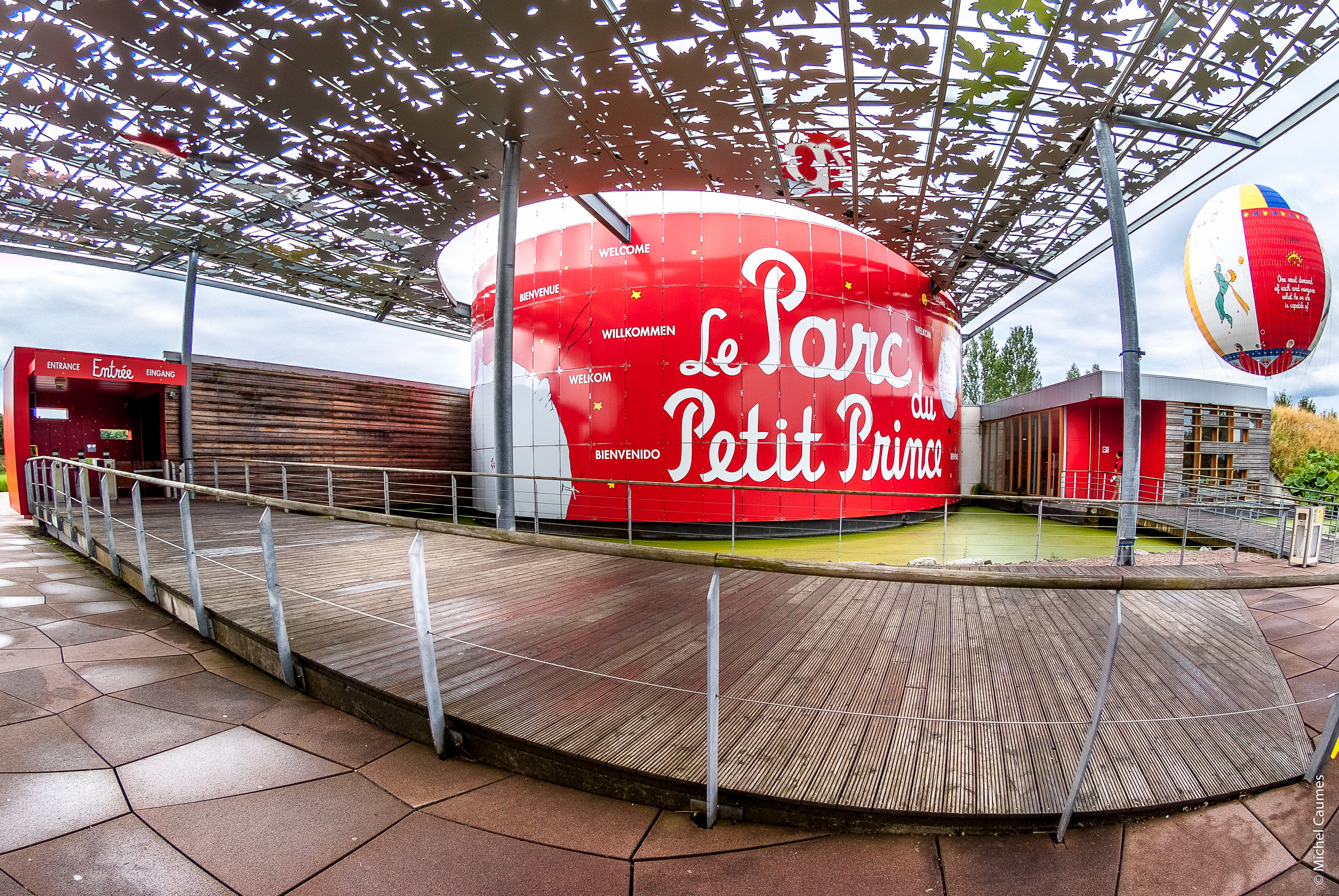
- Park entrance
- Interactive map of Parc du Petit Prince
- Location: Ungersheim, Alsace, France
- Coordinates: 47.8608°N 7.2969°E
- Opened: July 1, 2014
- Owner: Aérophile SAS

Attractions
- Total: 36
- Roller coasters: 3
- Water rides: 1
- Shows: 6
- Website: Official website

Parc du Petit Prince is a theme park inspired by the tale of the French writer Antoine de Saint-Exupéry. It is located in Ungersheim in the Alsace region in France, more specifically in the Haut-Rhin department. The park is the first aerial parc in the world and the most visited in the region.

The park replaces Le Bioscope, which closed on 30 September 2012.

== History ==
From 2006 to 2012, the area was owned by another amusement park dedicated to the environment, the Bioscope.

In September 2012, the syndicate's executive committee launched a call for projects to find a new owner.

With the agreement of Olivier d'Agay, director of the Saint-Exupéry succession foundation and great-nephew of the author, the managers of Aerophile SAS, Jérôme Giacomoni and Matthieu Gobbi, had the idea of building a park on the theme of The Little Prince and won the call for projects in 2013.

On 1 July 2014, the Parc du Petit Prince, with an area of 24 hectares, opened its doors. It keeps the layout centred on the simulation of a meteorite crash as well as the main architectural elements but presents a new scenery inspired by the work of Antoine de Saint-Exupéry, including a biplane. The season ended with 90,000 visitors.

In its second year, the amusement park recorded 120,000 admissions. and in 2017, it reached for the first time 200,000 visitors.

In 2018, the Parc du Petit Prince took over the traditional Alsacian hotel Les Loges, with 40 rooms, and the restaurant La Taverne. The same year, the park redesigned one hectare of its domain to have a green space where visitors can meet the sheep, hens, rabbits, goats and pigeons of the park.

In 2019, the Thunderstone roller coaster came to enrich the park's offering of thrill rides.

For the 2022 season, the Park opens its doors with two new shows, Interstice, a show that immerses the visitor in the story of the Little Prince, and Planète des Animaux, an aerial ballet featuring emblematic characters from the tale. At the same time, the park completely redesigns the hotel Les Loges which is awarded a third star.

== Geographical location ==
The park is located 20 km away from Mulhouse and 25 km away from Colmar.

== Attractions ==
The Parc du Petit Prince is an amusement park that offers fun and educational activities for all ages. Visitors can enjoy thrill rides, interactive events and shows.

The Parc du Petit Prince offers 8 thrill rides:

- The Snake: A roller coaster on board of a giant snake, in a desert setting. Ride open to children from 1m30, and to accompanied children from 1m. (Manufacturer: Zierer)
- South Atlantik: Passengers board planes for a 10-meter-high drop into the water. Ride open to children from 1m20, and to accompanied children from 95 cm. Accessible to people with reduced mobility. (Manufacturer: Soquet)
- Thunderstone: A roller coaster on board a meteorite, in homage to the book The Little Prince, and to the real Pierre de Tonnerre (thunderstone in French), the first meteorite whose fall on Earth was observed, in 1492 in Alsace. Accessible to children from 1m20, and to accompanied children from 95 cm. (Manufacturer: Reverchon)
- The King's Balloon: A tethered balloon, going up to 150 meters in altitude, to offer its passengers a panorama of the park, the Vosges, the Black Forest, and the Alps. The ride can accommodate up to 30 people and is accessible to people with reduced mobility. (Manufacturer: Aerophil SAS)
- The Aerobar of the Drinker: Aerial bar with 15 seats, taking passengers for a drink with their feet in the void at 35 meters in height. Accessible to children from 1m20, or to accompanied children from 1 meter. (Manufacturer: Aerophil SAS)
- Flying chairs: Ride accessible to children from 1m20, and to accompanied children from 1m05. (Manufacturer: Zierer)
- Underwater Planet: 4D interactive cinema with laser guns in an underwater setting. Accessible to children from 1m20, and to accompanied children from 1m. Accessible to people with reduced mobility
- Little Prince and Friends: Obstacle course in the colours of the Okoo series. Accessible to children from 1m20, and to accompanied children from 1m. Accessible to people with reduced mobility

The park also offers attractions for a younger public:

- The fox burrow : Climb on the back of a fox for a ride around the burrow. Accessible to children from 1m20, and to accompanied children from 85 cm. ( Manufacturer: Zierer)
- The Little Train: A ride across the park between the Volcano station and the Citadel station. Accessible to all ages. Accessible to people with reduced mobility
- The fountain maze: A maze with clues given by the characters of the book, to obtain the secret code that will turn on the well
- The Citadel: Play area for children of all ages. Accessible to people with reduced mobility
- Southern Courier: Interactive game of geography and general knowledge. Accessible to all ages. Accessible to people with reduced mobility
- The big swing: Giant swing, to be used alone or with others. Accessible to all. Accessible to people with reduced mobility
- Draw Me a Sheep: A slate wall where the visitor can leave their message or their drawing. Accessible to all ages. Accessible to people with reduced mobility
- Metamorphosis: Photo area with green screen
- The Little Prince's Hopscotch
- Tyrolean traverse

In 2024, the parc has 6 shows:

- Tame-me
- The big movie theatre
- Meet the mascots
- The planets of the animals
- Interstice
- Halloween

== Photos ==
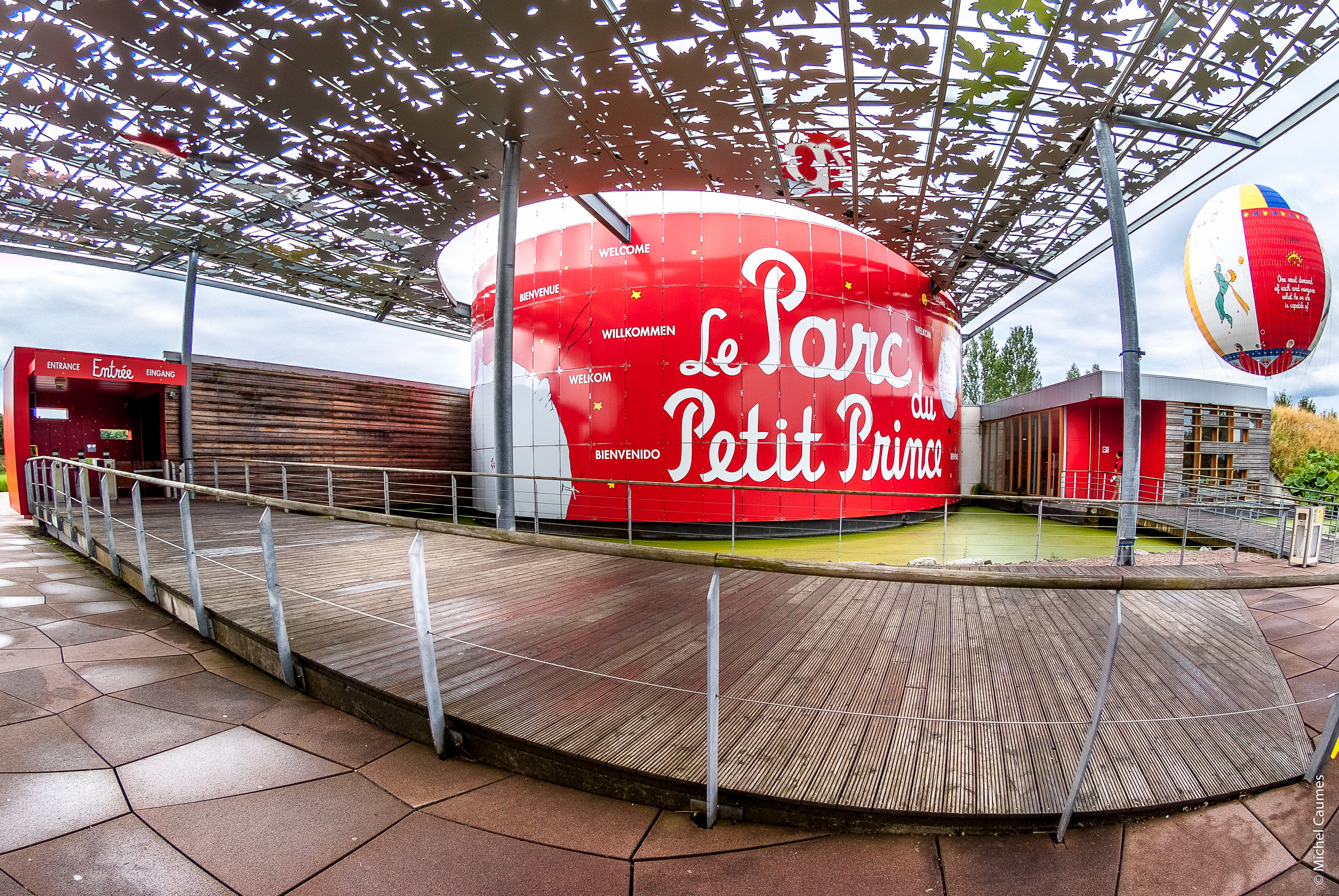
Entrance of the park

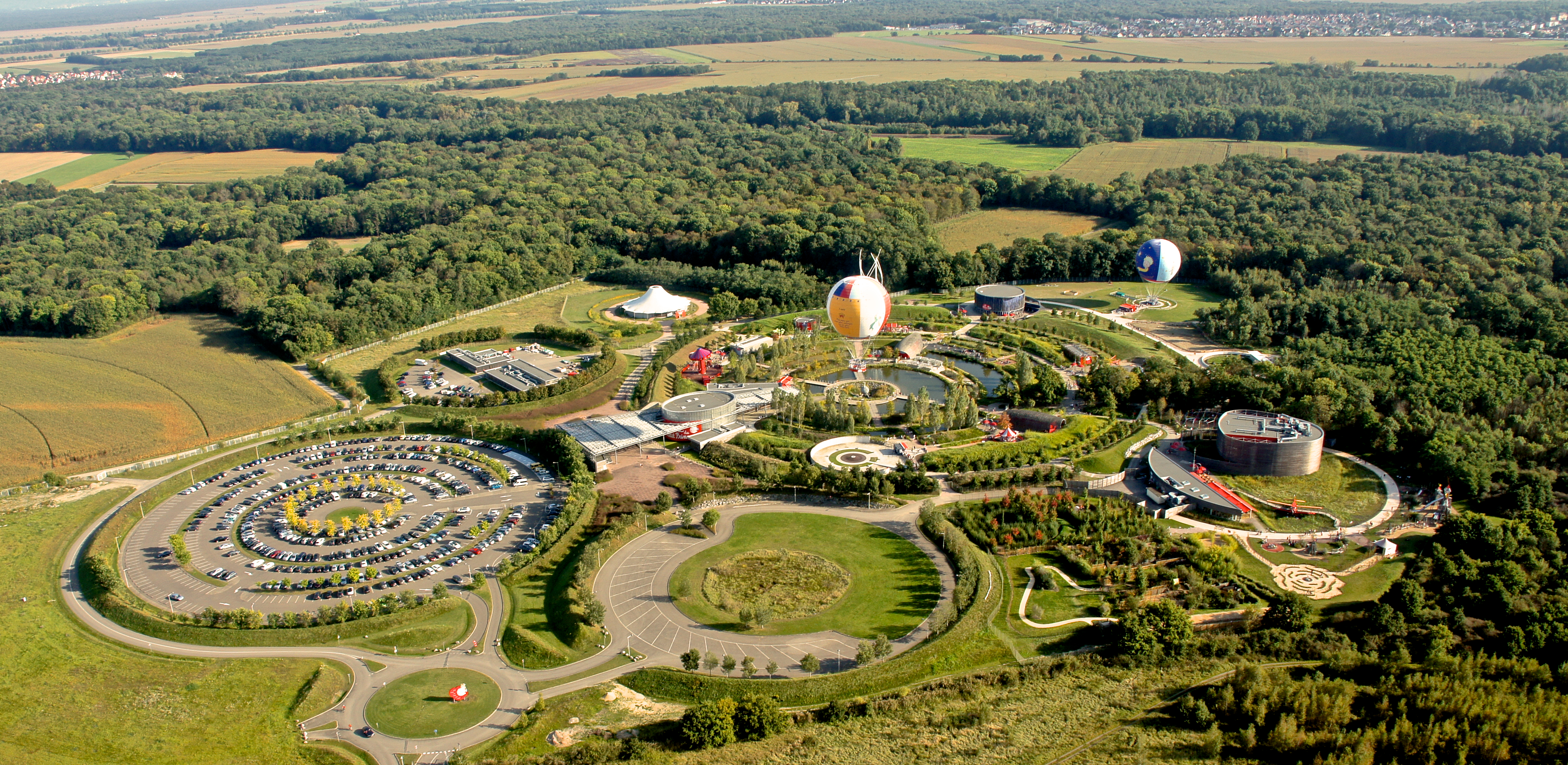
Aerial view from the King's Balloon

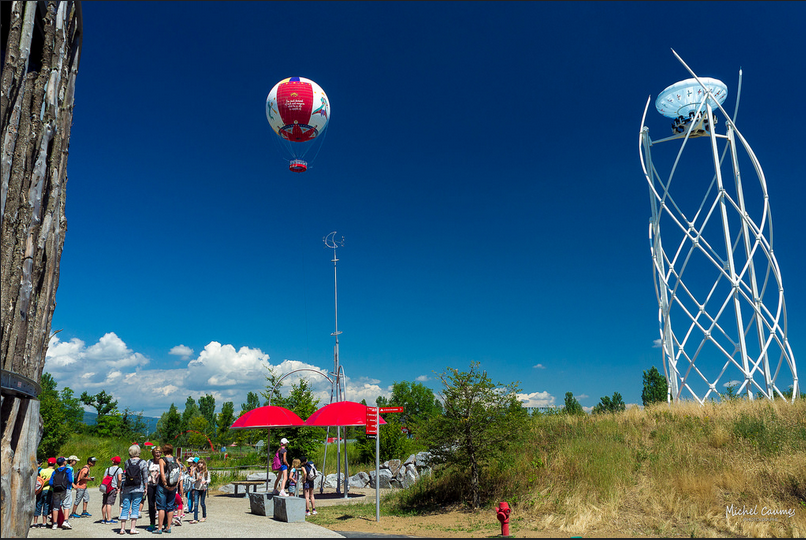
The King's Balloon and the Aerobar of the Drinker

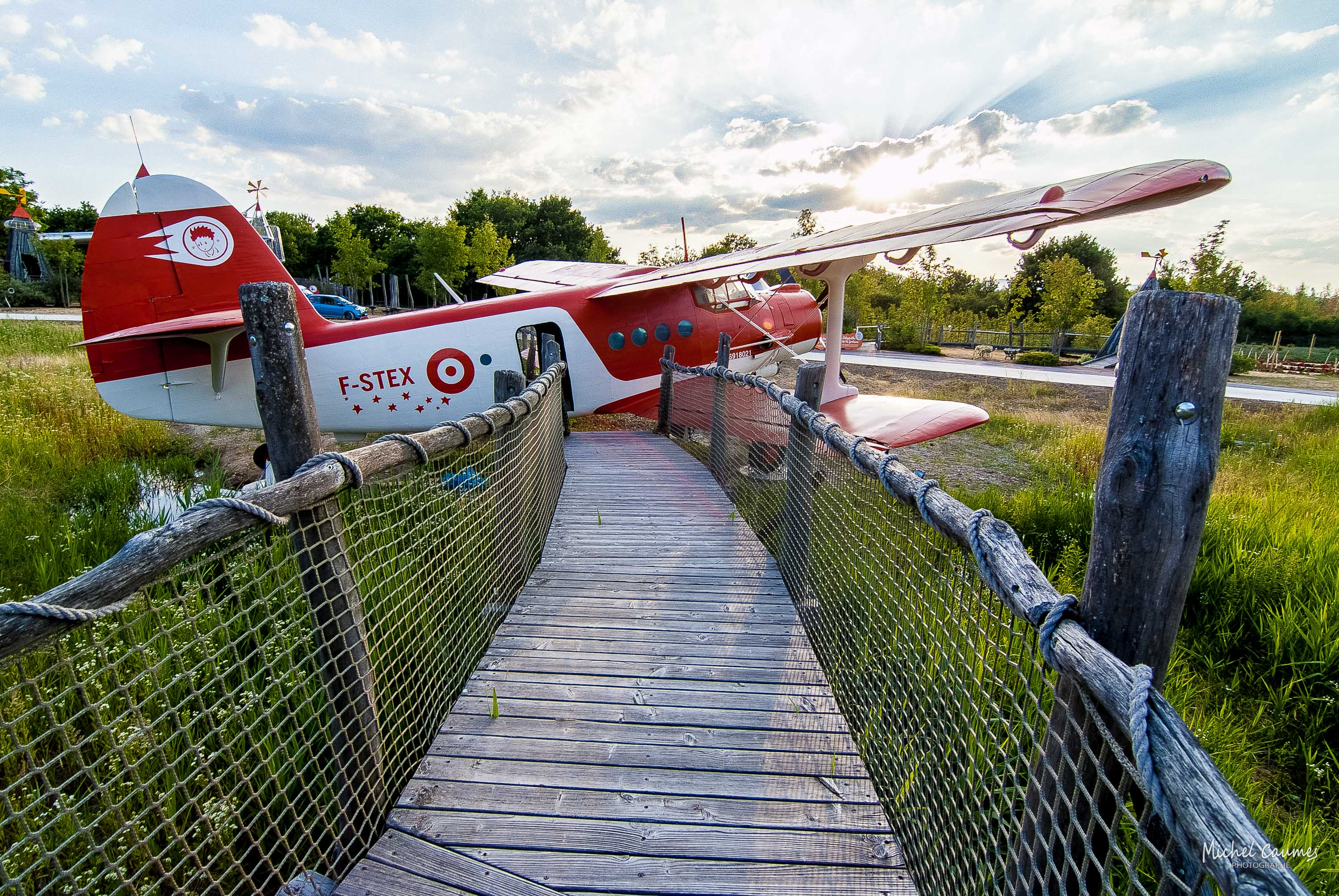
The Antonov An-2, legendary biplan

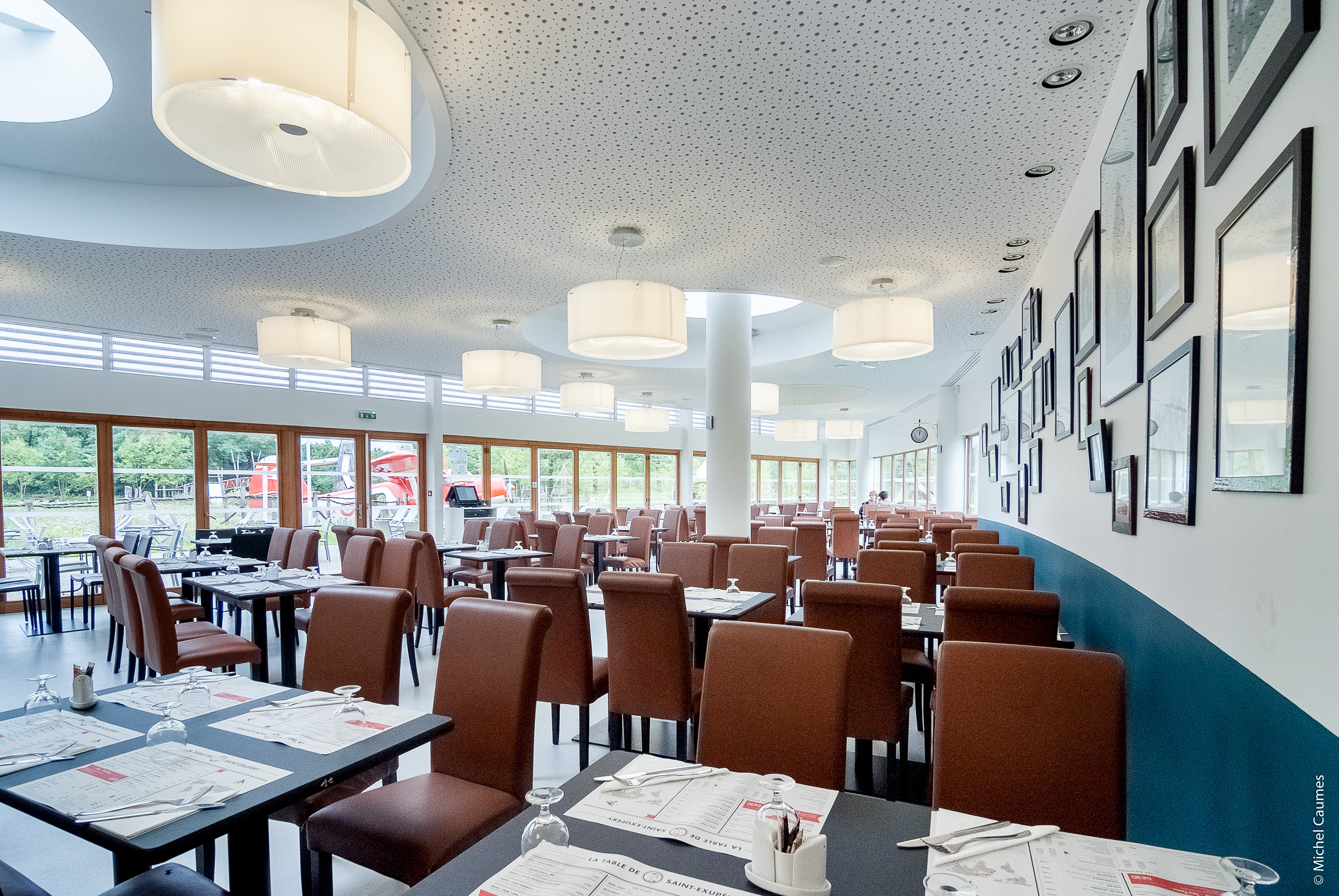
Restaurant The Table of Saint-Exupéry

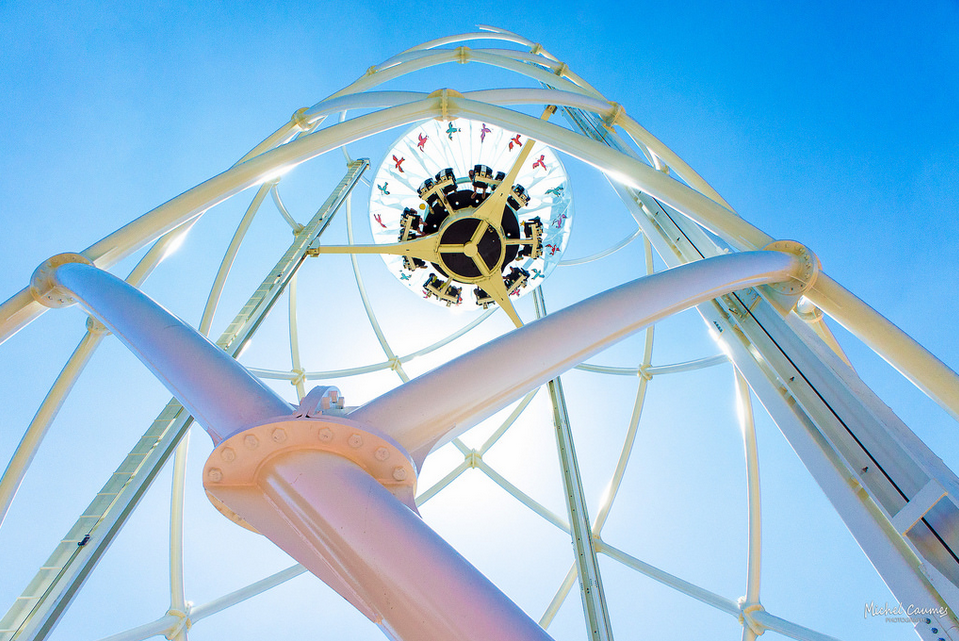
The Aerobar of the Drinker

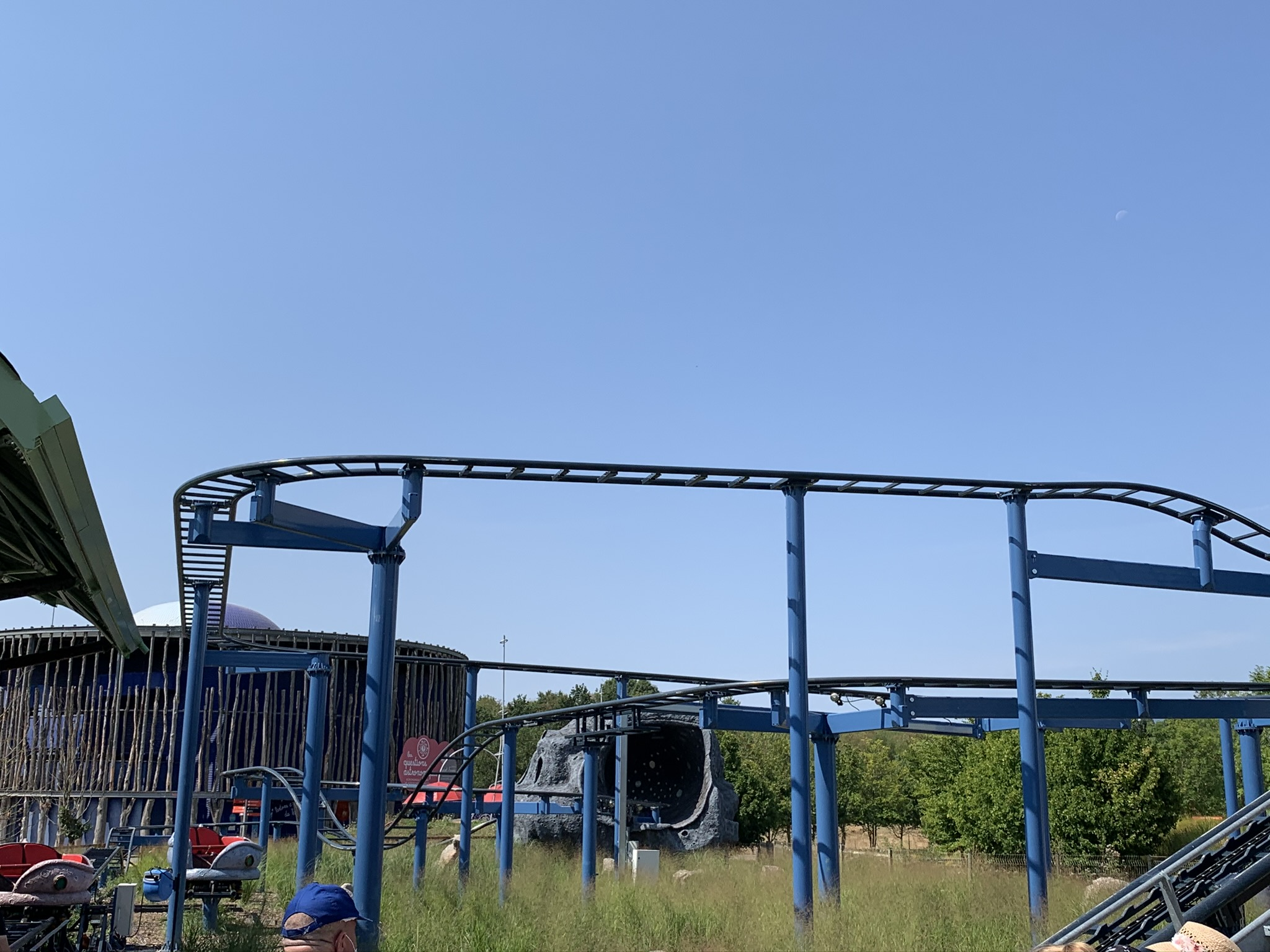
Thunderstone

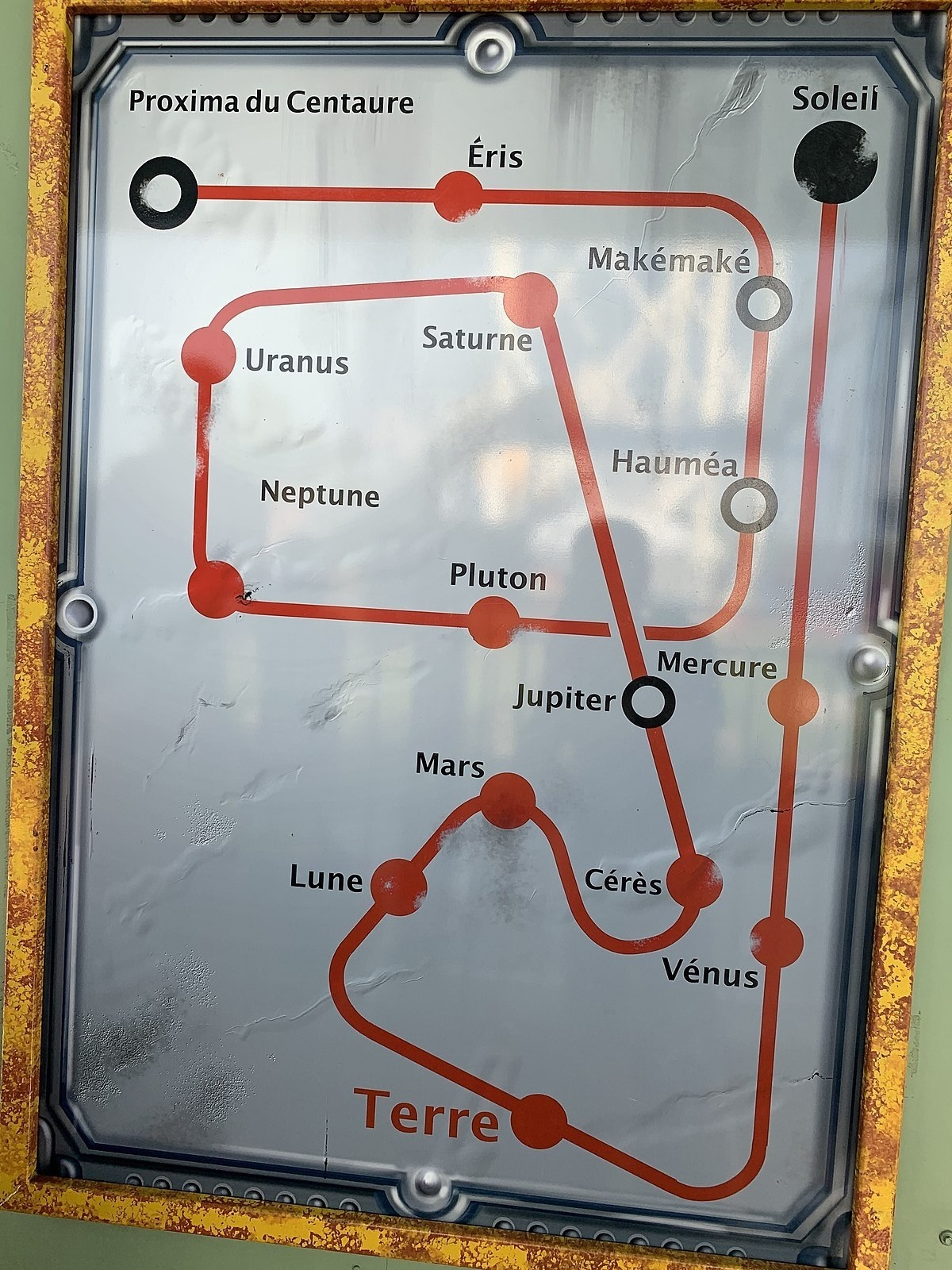
Thunderstone

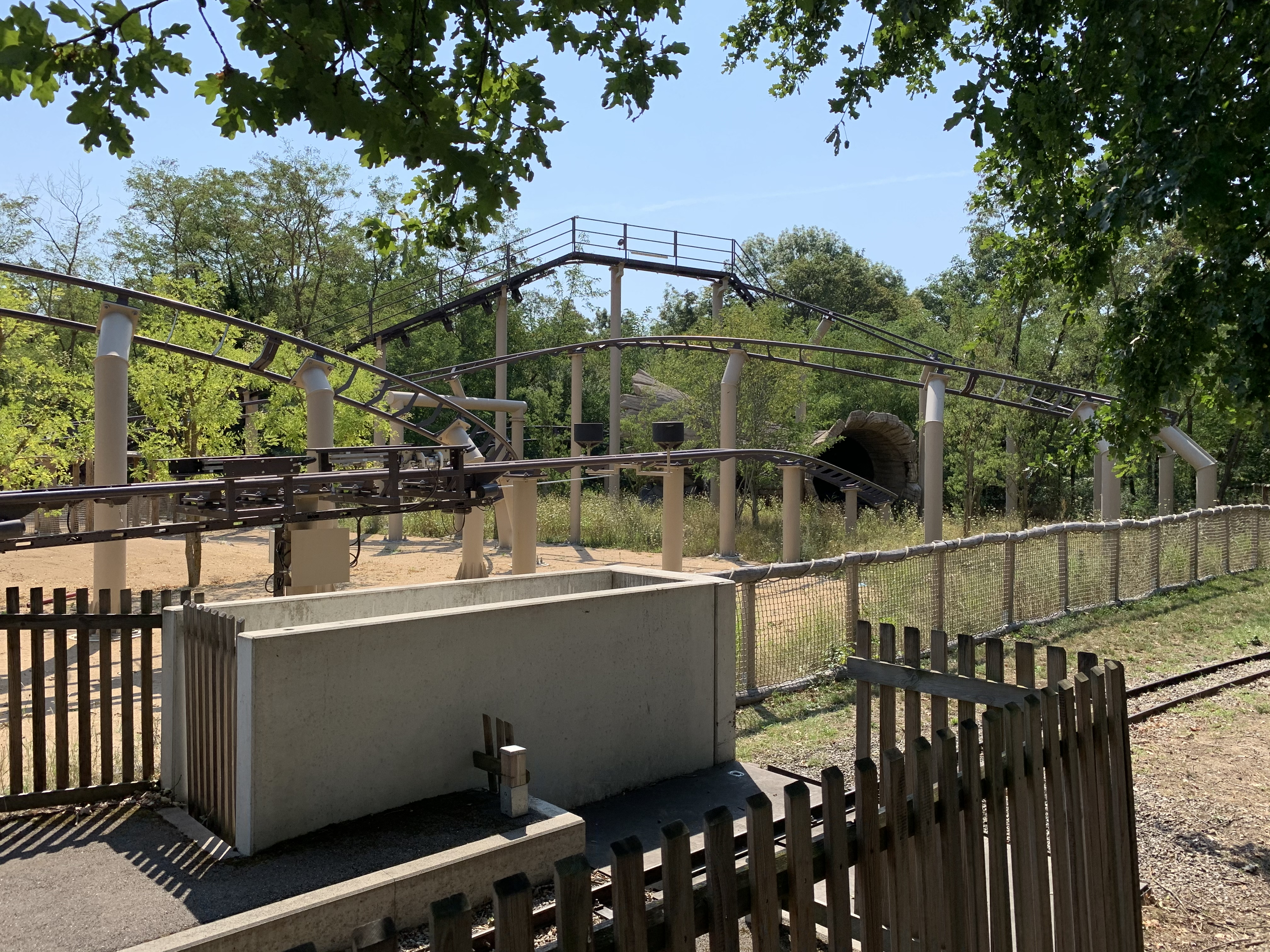
The Snake

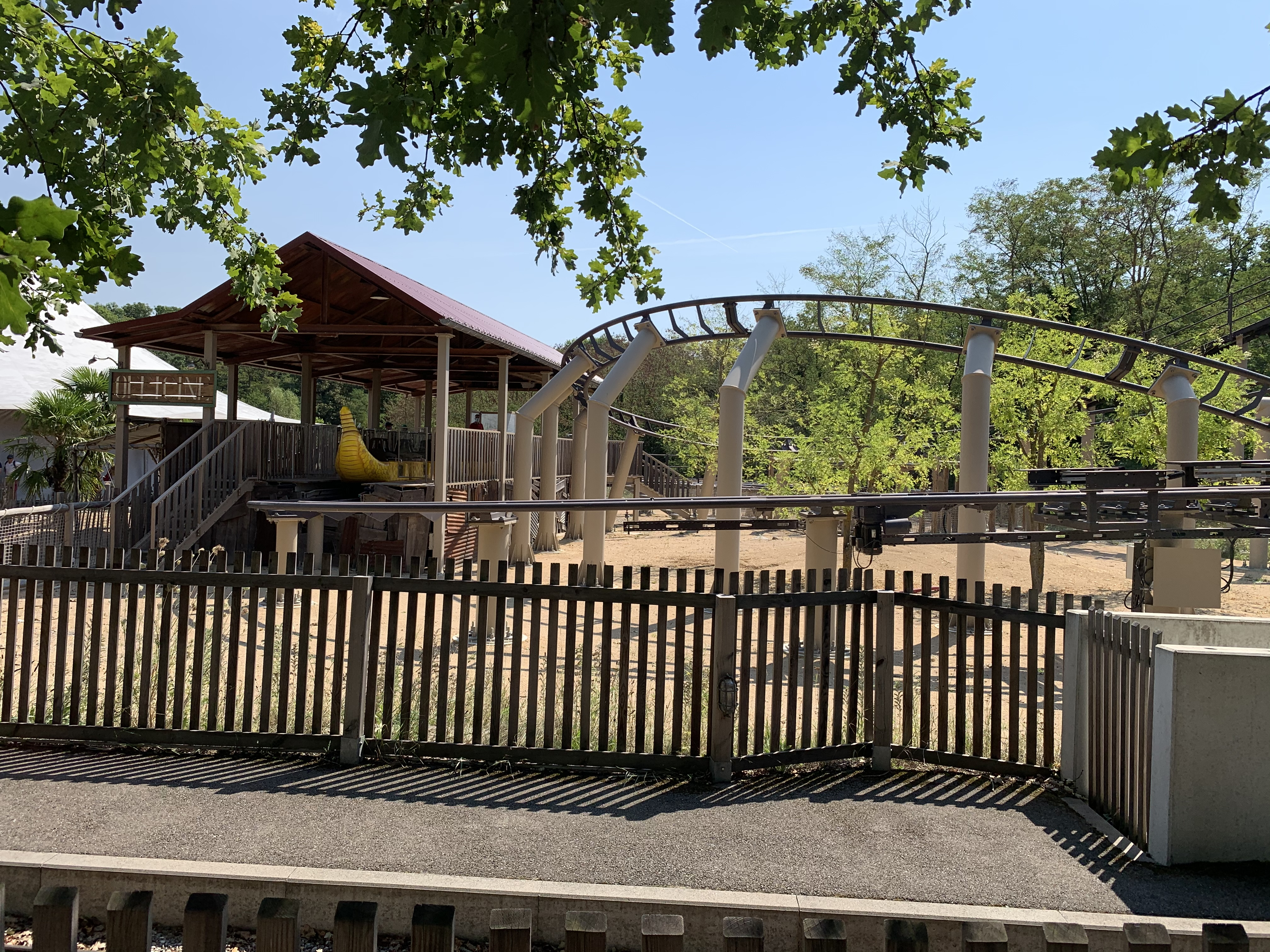
The Snake

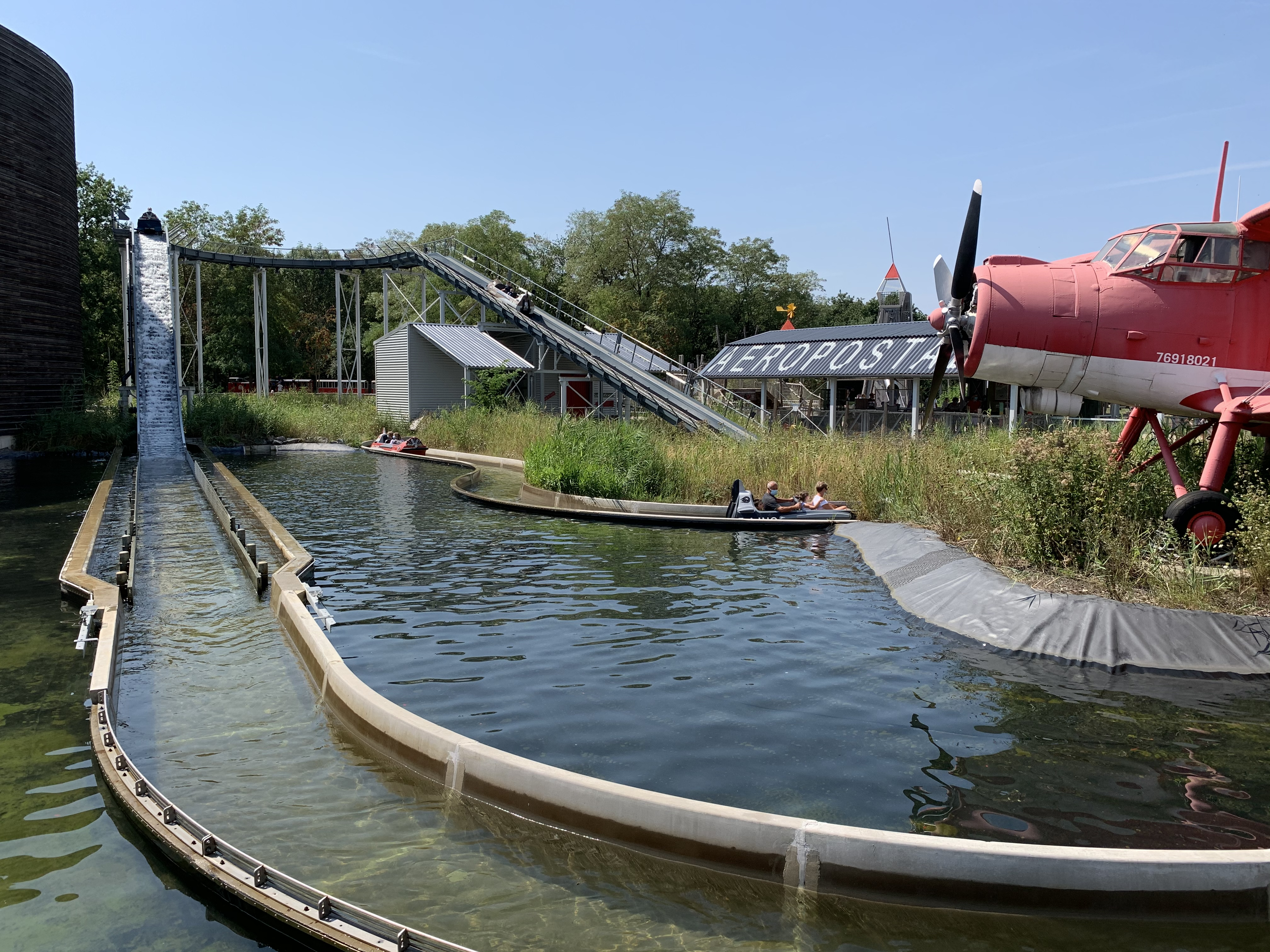
South Atlantik

== Bibliography ==
«The Little Prince» Antoine de Saint-Exupéry (1943 in New-York, United States, 1946 in France)
