= Ballon Generali =

Coordinates: 48°50′29″N 2°16′27″E

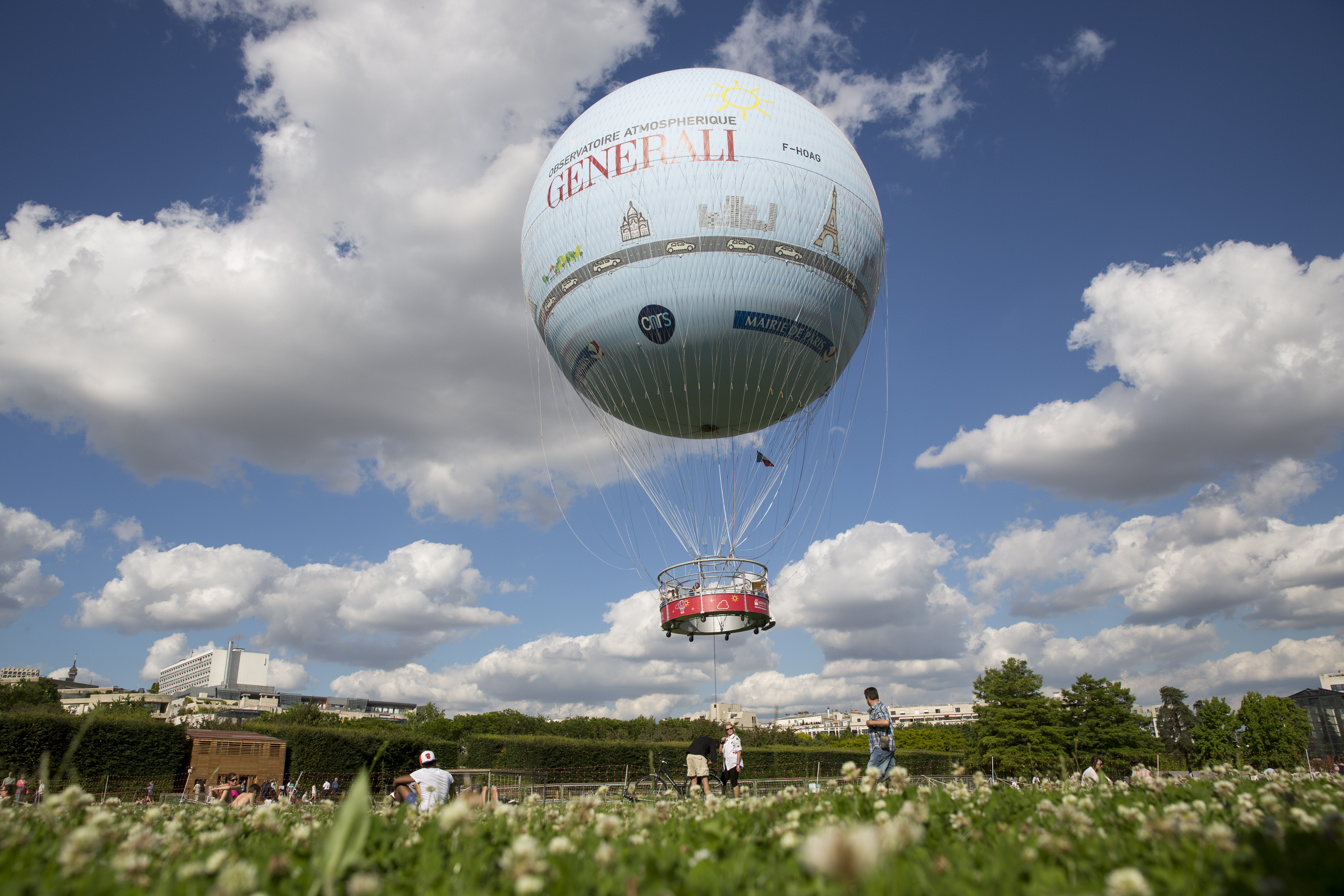
- Ballon Generali taking off

General information
- Type: helium balloon airship
- Manufacturer: Aerophile SAS
- Number built: 1

The Ballon Generali is a tethered helium balloon, used as tourist attraction and as an air quality awareness tool. Installed in Paris since 1999 in the Parc André-Citroën, it was created and developed by the French company Aerophile SAS for the celebration of the year 2000. The balloon has lofted more than 500,000 passengers into the sky since its opening.

== Operation ==
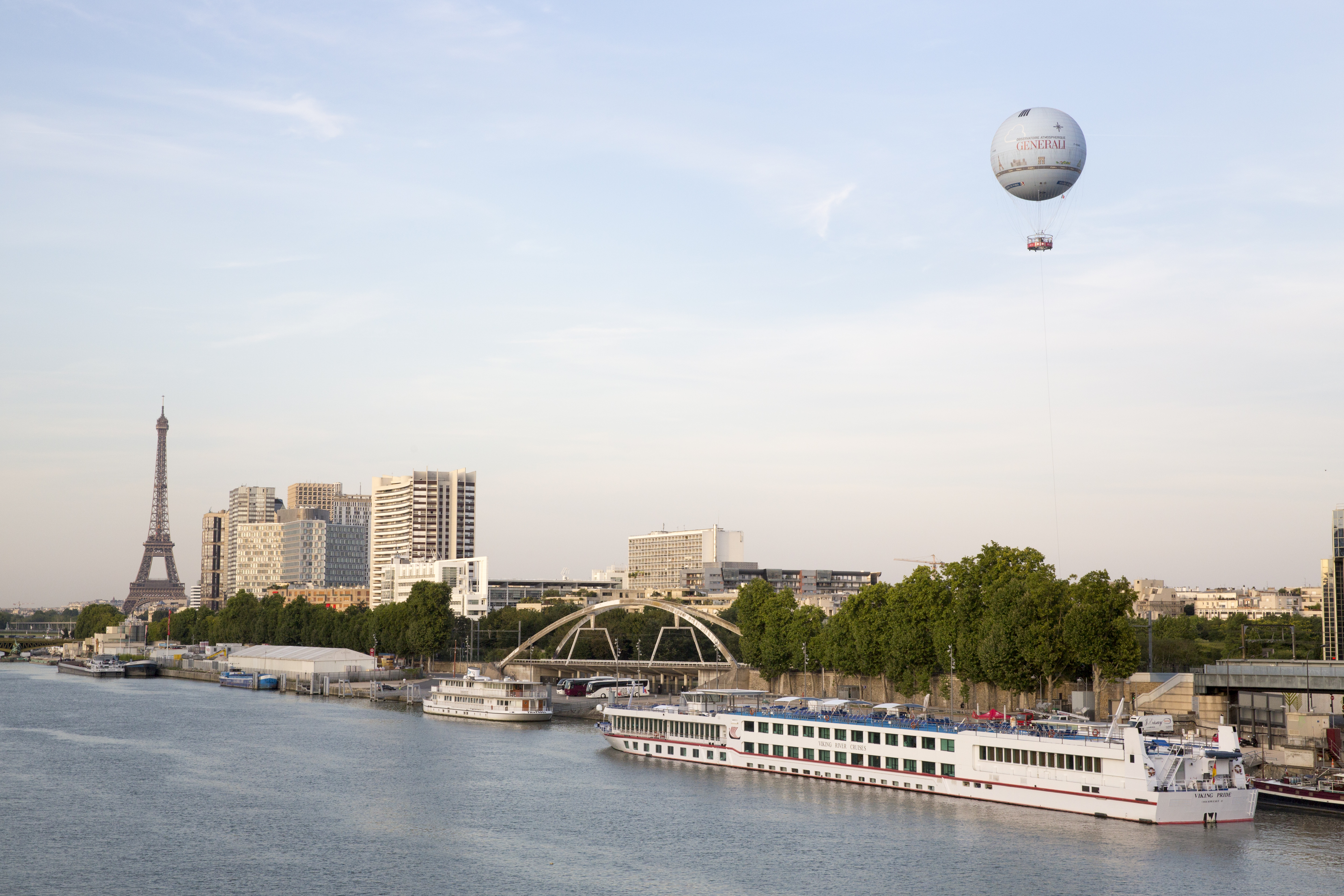
The Ballon Generali in flight, with the Eiffel Tower in the background.

The balloon, filled with 6,000 m^{3} (210,000 cu ft) of helium, is attached to the ground with a cable, controlled by an hydroelectric winch. This tourist attraction can board up to 30 passengers (this amounts to around 2,500 kg (5,500 lb)) at 150 m (490 ft) above Paris. It is 32 m (105 ft) high, and has a diameter of 22 m (72 ft).

It has been used as advertising billboard for Fortis, then from 2002 for Eutelsat. In 2008, a partnership was signed with Banque populaire and Airparif. Renamed ballon Air de Paris, the balloon's internal illumination system changes its outer colour in real-time according to the ambient air pollution in Paris, as measured by Airparif. Colors range from green (good), through orange (poor), to red (bad).

This system was completed by an independent lighting (panels light-emitting diode, visible especially at night on the lower part of the shell) stating the air quality near traffic with the same colour code.

On April 18, 2013, a brand new tethered helium balloon was introduced, renamed the "Ballon Generali" (the Italian insurance company Generali has entered partnership agreements to more than 14 years with the Mairie de Paris). Since that day, every year it lifts around 50,000 visitors. The trip lasts around 10 minutes. In the morning, with optimal weather conditions, the Ballon Generali can reach the altitude of 300 m (980 ft), making it the second highest point in Paris after the Eiffel Tower.

== See also ==
- Aerophile SAS
