= Aerostat =

Lighter-than-air aircraft

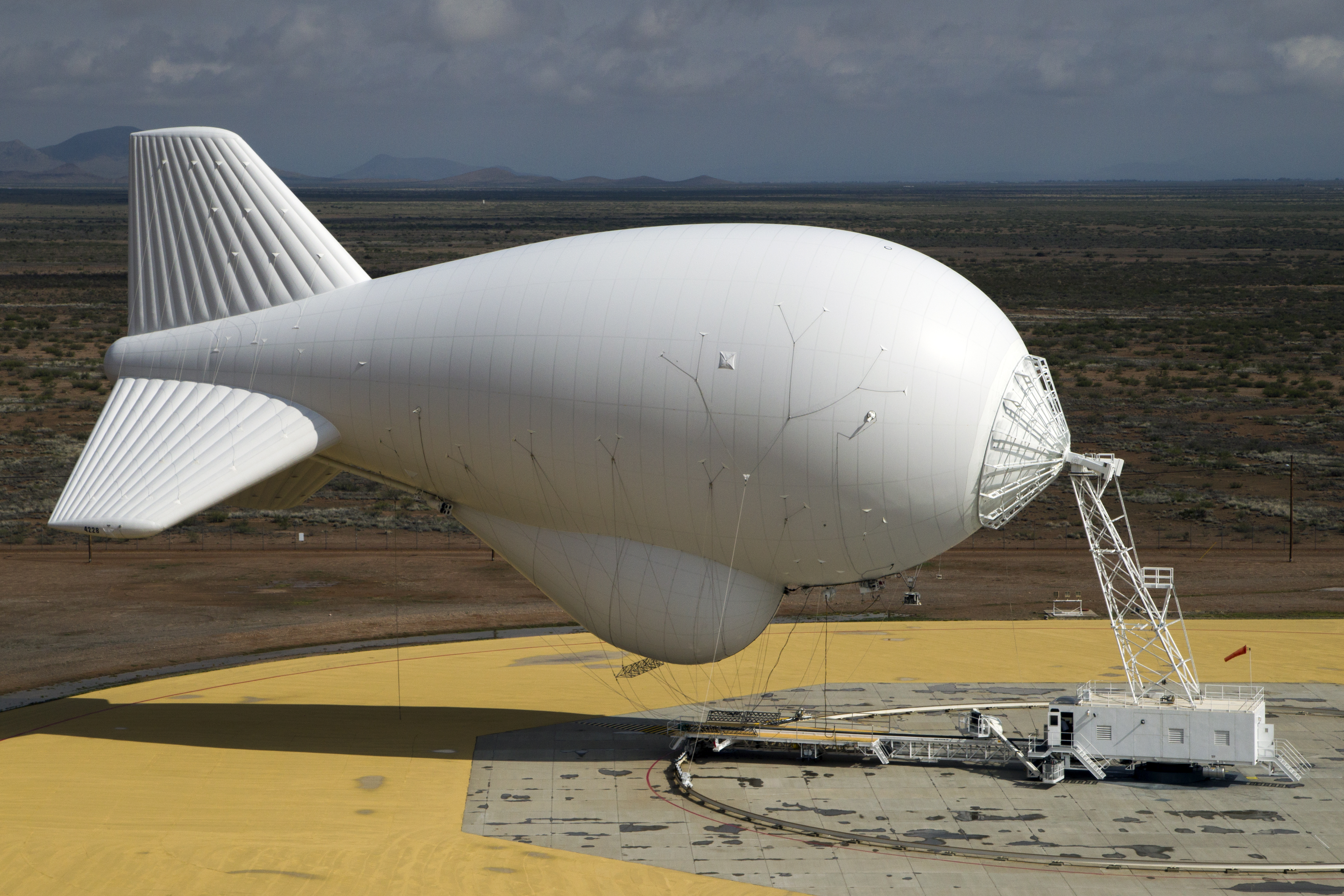
A modern aerostat used by the U.S. Department of Homeland Security, the Tethered Aerostat Radar System (TARS)

An aerostat (from Ancient Greek ἀήρ (aḗr) 'air' and στατός (statós) 'standing', via French) or lighter-than-air aircraft is an aircraft that relies on buoyancy to maintain flight. Aerostats include unpowered balloons (free-flying or tethered) and powered airships.

The relative density of an aerostat as a whole is lower than that of the surrounding atmospheric air (hence the name "lighter-than-air"). Its main component is one or more gas capsules made of lightweight skins, containing a lifting gas (hot air, or any gas with lower density than air, typically hydrogen or helium) that displaces a large volume of air to generate enough buoyancy to overcome its own weight. Payload (passengers and cargo) can then be carried on attached components such as a basket, a gondola, a cabin or various hardpoints. With airships, which need to be able to fly against wind, the lifting gas capsules are often protected by a more rigid outer envelope or an airframe, with other gasbags such as ballonets to help modulate buoyancy.

Aerostats are so named because they use aerostatic buoyant force that does not require any forward movement through the surrounding air mass, resulting in the inherent ability to levitate and perform vertical takeoff and landing. This contrasts with the heavier-than-air aerodynes that primarily use aerodynamic lift, which must have consistent airflow over an aerofoil (wing) surface to stay airborne. The term has also been used in a narrower sense, to refer to the statically tethered balloon in contrast to the free-flying airship. This article uses the term in its broader sense.

== Terminology ==
In conventional usage, the term aerostat refers to any aircraft that remains aloft primarily using aerostatic buoyancy.

Historically, all aerostats were called balloons. Powered types capable of horizontal flight were referred to as dirigible balloons or simply dirigibles (from the French dirigeable, meaning "steerable"). These powered aerostats later came to be called airships, with the term "balloon" reserved for unpowered types, whether tethered (which means attached to the ground) or free-floating.

More recently, the US Government Accountability Office has used the term "aerostat" in a different sense, to distinguish the statically tethered balloon from the free-flying airship.

== Types ==
=== Balloons ===
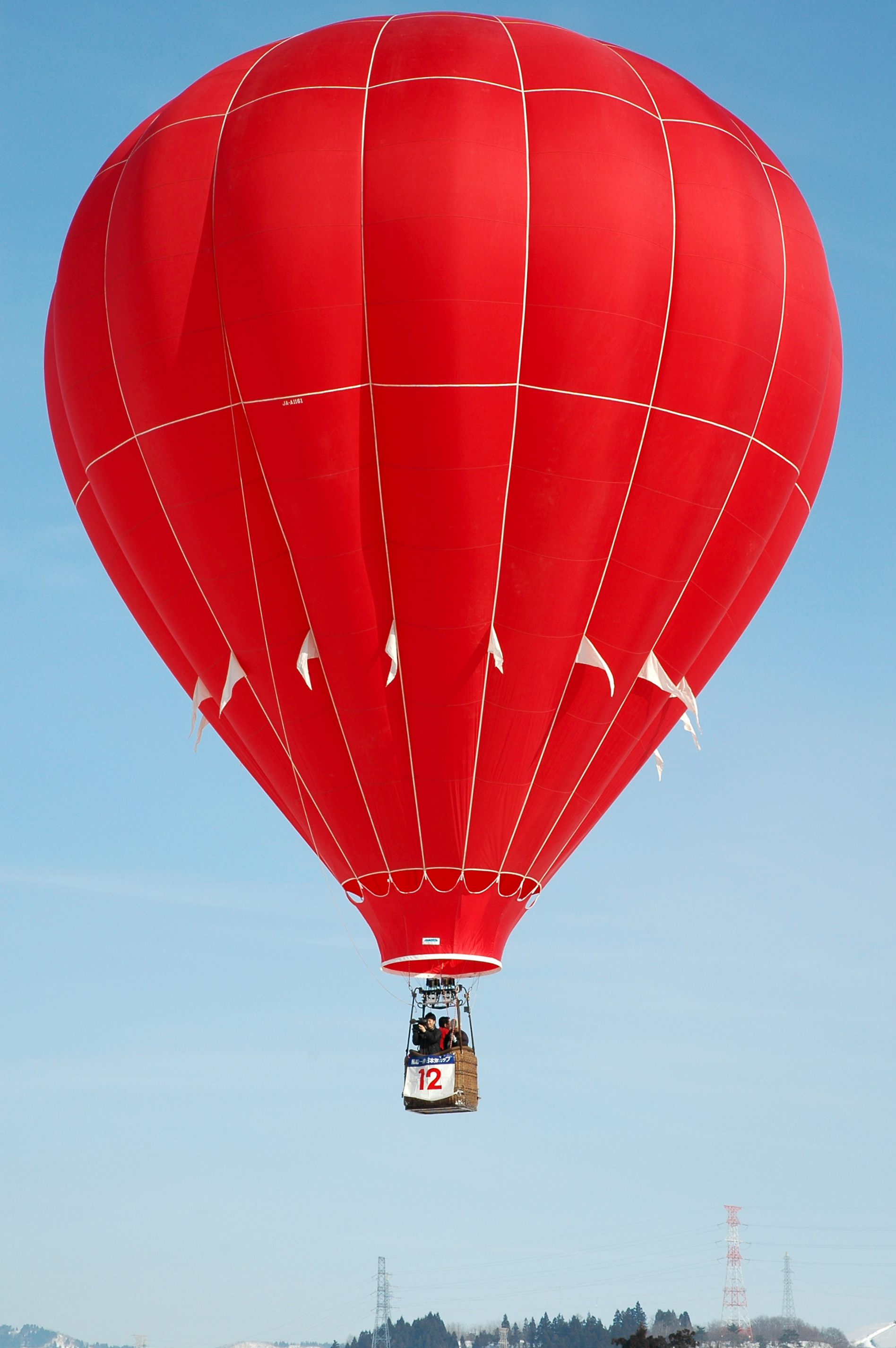
A free-flying hot air balloon

A balloon is an unpowered aerostat which has no means of propulsion and must be either tethered on a long cable or allowed to drift freely with the wind.

Although a free balloon travels at the speed of the wind, it is travelling with the wind so to a passenger the air feels calm and windless. To change its altitude it must either adjust the amount of lift or discard ballast weight. Notable uses of free-flying balloons include meteorological balloons and sport balloons.

A tethered balloon is held down by one or more mooring lines or tethers. It has sufficient lift to hold the line taut and its altitude is controlled by winching the line in or out. A tethered balloon does feel the wind. A round balloon is unstable and bobs about in strong winds, so the kite balloon was developed with an aerodynamic shape similar to a non-rigid airship. Both kite balloons and non-rigid airships are sometimes called "blimps". Notable uses of tethered balloons include observation balloons and barrage balloons and notable uses of untethered balloons include espionage balloons and fire balloons.

=== Airships ===
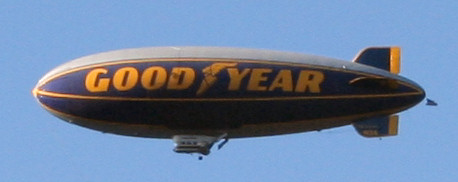
Goodyear Blimps are non-rigid airships.

An airship is a powered, free-flying aerostat that can be steered. Airships divide into rigid, semi-rigid and non-rigid types, with these last often known as blimps.

A rigid airship has an outer framework or skin surrounding the lifting gas bags inside it, the outer envelope keeps its shape even if the gasbags are deflated. The great zeppelin airships of the twentieth century were rigid types.

A non-rigid airship or blimp deflates like a balloon as it loses gas. The Goodyear Blimps are still a common sight in the USA.

A semi-rigid airship has a deflatable gas bag like a non-rigid but with a supporting structure to help it hold its shape while aloft. The first practical airship, the Santos-Dumont No. 6 was a semi-rigid.

Some airships obtain additional lift aerodynamically as they travel through the air, using the shape of their envelope or through the addition of fins or even small wings. Types designed to exploit this lifting effect in normal cruise are called hybrid airships.

=== Hybrid aerostats ===
A hybrid type uses both static buoyancy and dynamic airflow to provide lift. The dynamic movement may be created either using propulsive power as a hybrid airship or by tethering in the wind like a kite, as a Helikite or kytoon.

Helikites do not need ballonets and so are simpler in construction than traditional aerostats and Helikites do not need constant electrical power to keep them airborne. Helikites are also extremely stable and so are good aerial platforms for cameras or scientific instruments. Helikites are one of the most popular aerostat designs and are widely used by the scientific community, military, photographers, geographers, police, first responders.

Helikites range in size from 1 metre (gas volume 0.13 m^{3}) with a pure helium lift of 30g, up to 14 metres (gas volume 250m^{3}) able to lift 117 kg. Small Helikites can fly up to altitudes of 1,000 ft, and medium-sized Helikites up to altitudes of 3,000 ft, while large Helikites can achieve 7,000 ft.

The Allsopp Helikite is a combination of a helium balloon and a kite to form a single, aerodynamically sound tethered aircraft, that exploits both wind and helium for its lift. Helikites are semi-rigid. Helikites are considered the most stable, energy and cost-efficient aerostats available.

Piasecki Helicopter developed the Piasecki PA-97 Helistat using the rotor systems from four obsolete helicopters and a surplus Navy blimp, in order to provide a capability to lift heavier loads than a single helicopter could provide. The aircraft suffered a fatal accident during a test flight. In 2008, Boeing and SkyHook International resurrected the concept and announced a proposed design of the SkyHook JHL-40.

== Lifting gases ==
In order to provide buoyancy, any lifting gas must be less dense than the surrounding air. A hot air balloon is open at the bottom to allow hot air to enter, while the gas balloon is closed to stop the (cold) lifting gas from escaping. Common lifting gases have included hydrogen, coal gas and helium.

=== Hot air ===
When heated, air expands. This lowers its density and creates lift. Small hot air balloons or lanterns have been flown in China since ancient times. The first modern man-lifting aerostat, made by the Montgolfier brothers, was a hot air balloon. Most early balloons however were gas balloons. Interest in the sport of hot air ballooning reawoke in the second half of the twentieth century and even some hot-air airships have been flown.

=== Hydrogen ===
Hydrogen is the lightest of all gases and a manned hydrogen balloon was flown soon after the Montgolfier brothers. There is no need to burn fuel, so a gas balloon can stay aloft far longer than a hot-air balloon. Hydrogen soon became the most common lifting gas for both balloons and, later, airships. But hydrogen itself is flammable and, following several major disasters in the 1930s, including the Hindenburg Disaster, it fell out of use.

=== Coal gas ===
Coal gas comprises a mix of methane and other gases, and typically has about half the lifting power of hydrogen. In the late nineteenth and early twentieth centuries municipal gas works became common and provided a cheap source of lifting gas. Some works were able to produce a special mix for ballooning events, incorporating a higher proportion of hydrogen and less carbon monoxide, to improve its lifting power.

=== Helium ===
Helium is the only lifting gas which is both non-flammable and non-toxic, and it has almost as much (about 92%) lifting power as hydrogen. It was not discovered in quantity until early in the twentieth century, and for many years only the United States had enough to use in airships. Almost all gas balloons and airships now use helium.

=== Low-pressure gases ===
Although not currently practical, it may be possible to construct a rigid, lighter-than-air structure which, rather than being inflated with air, is at a vacuum relative to the surrounding air. This would allow the object to float above the ground without any heat or special lifting gas, but the structural challenges of building a rigid vacuum chamber lighter than air are quite significant. Even so, it may be possible to improve the performance of more conventional aerostats by trading gas weight for structural weight, combining the lifting properties of the gas with vacuum and possibly heat for enhanced lift.

== Buoyancy control ==
The buoyancy control of an aerostat relies on the principles of buoyant force and the manipulation of the gas inside its envelope. Aerostats use lighter-than-air gases, such as helium or hydrogen, which provide lift because they are less dense than the surrounding air. The amount of buoyant force generated depends on the volume of the gas, its density, and the density of the outside atmosphere. By controlling these variables, an aerostat can be made to rise, descend, or maintain a stable altitude. The basic mechanism involves adjusting the volume and pressure of the gas within the aerostat’s envelope, often through a system of valves and compartments.

To ascend, the aerostat releases ballast, which typically consists of sandbags or other weights, reducing its overall weight and making it lighter than the air it displaces. Alternatively, it may adjust the temperature of the gas (if using hot air) or expand the volume of gas within its envelope. As the gas volume increases, the aerostat becomes less dense and rises. This is controlled either through heating (in the case of hot air balloons) or by adjusting the valves that manage the flow of gas between different compartments or the outside atmosphere. Helium-based aerostats, such as blimps, rely on maintaining the integrity and volume of the helium within their envelope to achieve a stable lift.

When descending, the aerostat must reduce its buoyancy, which can be done by venting some of the gas or by taking on additional ballast. Venting gas allows the envelope to lose volume, making the aerostat denser than the surrounding air and causing it to descend. However, venting must be done cautiously, especially with helium, as it is a limited resource and cannot be replenished easily during flight. Alternatively, an aerostat might use a reversible system where it can compress the gas into smaller compartments within the envelope, reducing lift without permanently losing the gas. By managing these compartments or adjusting the flow of gas, the aerostat’s buoyancy can be precisely controlled.

To maintain altitude, an aerostat achieves a balance where the lift force generated by the gas equals the weight of the aerostat. This equilibrium is achieved through small adjustments in ballast or the gas volume. Sophisticated systems might use automatic valves and sensors to monitor atmospheric pressure, gas volume, and temperature, ensuring that the aerostat remains stable without manual intervention. This constant regulation allows aerostats to hover at a fixed altitude for extended periods, making them useful for applications such as surveillance, communication relays, or scientific observations, where maintaining a consistent position in the atmosphere is crucial.

== See also ==
- Aerodyne – Vehicle or machine that can fly by gaining support from the air
- Aerostatics – Study of gases that are not in motion
- Airborne wind turbine#Aerostat variety – High-altitude flying turbine for generating electricity
- Buoyancy – Upward force that opposes the weight of an object immersed in fluid
- Cloud nine – Proposed airborne habitats
- Lifting gas – Gas used to create buoyancy in a balloon or aerostat
- Square–cube law – Relation between surface area and volume as size increases

	Aerostat	Aerodyne		
	Lift: Lighter than air gas	Lift: Fixed wing	Lift: Unpowered rotor	Lift: Powered rotor
Unpowered free flight	(Free) balloon	Glider	Helicopter, etc. in autorotation	(None – see note 2)
Tethered (static or towed)	Tethered balloon	Kite	Rotor kite	(None – see note 2)
Powered	Airship	Airplane, ornithopter, etc.	Autogyro	Gyrodyne, helicopter
