= Aerophile =

French balloon manufacturer

Aerophile SAS
- Type: Public limited company
- Industry: Development and operation of tethered helium balloons
- Founded: 1993
- Founders: Jérôme Giacomoni Matthieu Gobbi
- Headquarters: Paris, France
- Area served: Worldwide
- Key people: Jérôme Giacomoni, Matthieu Gobbi
- Products: Tethered helium balloons
- Website: http://www.aerophile.com/

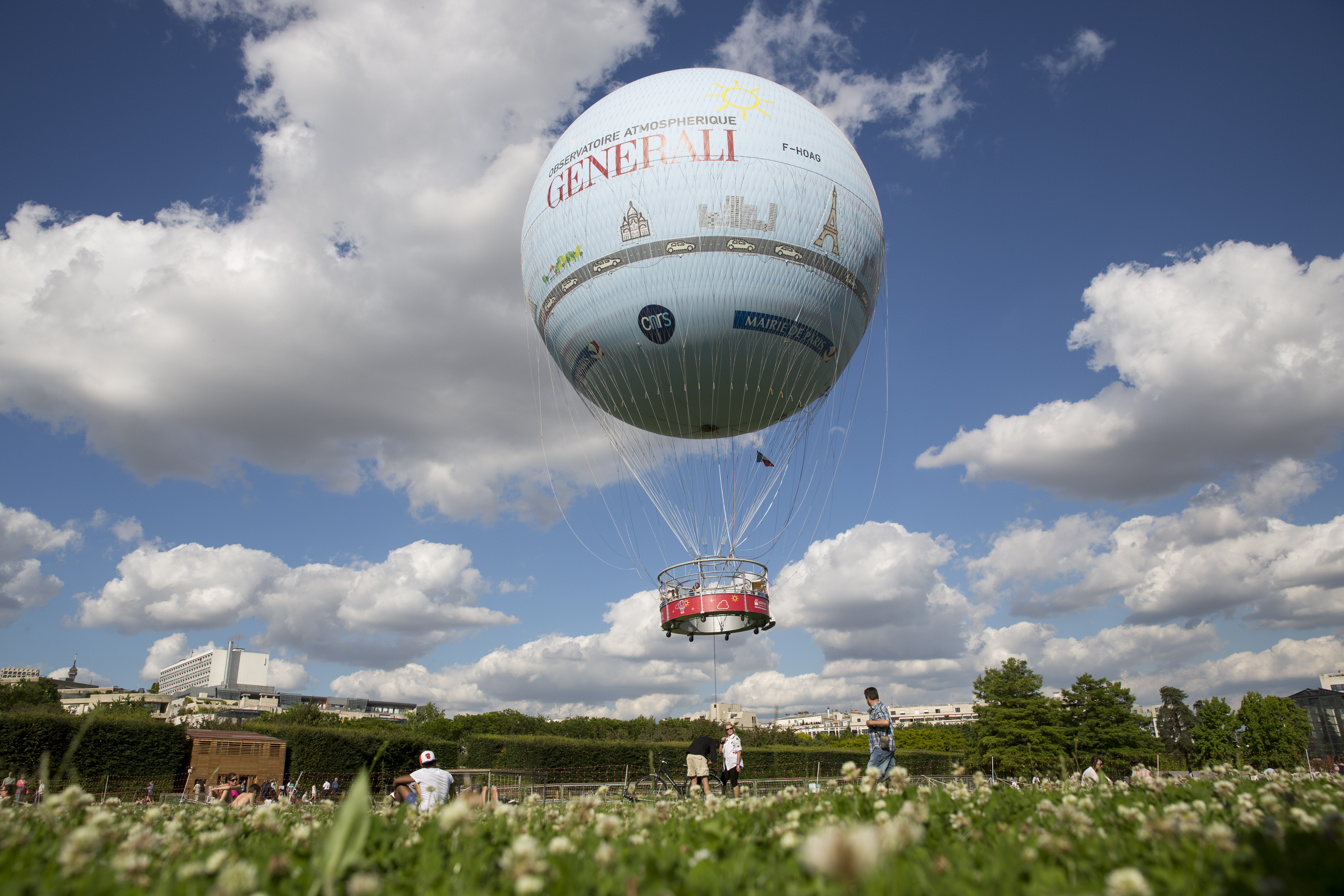
Ballon Generali taking off

Aerophile SAS is a French company specialized in building, selling and operating tethered helium balloons. Founded in 1993, it operates the tethered gas balloons as tourist attractions around the world.

These balloons filled with helium and tethered to the ground by a cable can carry up to 30 passengers at an altitude of 150 meters.

The company has sold more than 120 balloons in 40 countries.

Aerophile is also the inventor of l'Aerobar, an aerial bar.

== History ==
Aerophile was founded in 1993 by two 25-year-old French engineers from the École Polytechnique, Mathieu Gobbi and Jerome Giacomoni. In 1994, they installed their first large tethered balloon in Chantilly, France and in 1998, Aerophile celebrated its first flight to an altitude of 300 metres (980 ft). In 1999, the company launched the large Paris Balloon and improved it in 2008 by adding a lighting system.

In 2000, the company created a mobile tethered balloon approved to carry two people to a height of 90 metres (300 ft): the Aero2.

In 2002 they operated the first modern tethered gas ballon on a water-based platform at Neuchâtel.

In 2005 the company installed a large PanoraMagique balloon, operated by a subsidiary Aerotourism, at Disneyland Paris, it was the first 8-point Aero30NG balloon.

In 2007, they set up and opened the first Aerophare in Evry 2 (France), an attraction with an air-filled captive balloon within a 54 metres (177 ft) tower. Aerophare is a novel adaptation of a tethered balloon operating in an enclosed tower.

In 2008, the Ballon Generali, in partnership with Airparif, shows in real time the quality of air in Paris by changing color depending on the pollution level.

In 2009, a ballon was set up at Walt Disney World by Aerophile.

In 2013, the Aerobar, an aerial bar was set up at the Futuroscope. The same year, the Ballon Generali became an air lab measuring the air quality of Paris with scientific instruments mounted in the context of a cooperation with the French National Centre for Scientific Research. In the USA, Aerophile resumed control of the balloon installed at the San Diego Zoo.

In 2014, Aerophile opened an amusement parc based on the creation of Antoine de Saint-Exupéry, the Parc du Petit Prince. The Little Prince Park is located in Ungersheim in the Alsace region. The park gets its name from the French novel The Little Prince. A total of 31 attractions are based loosely on the theme of flight.

In 2018, the company started a R&D project for a system of external air purification inspired by the scientific work lead at the Ballon Generali. The same year, the balloon installed near the Angkor temples in Cambodia resumed flying.

In 2021, an air purifier Para-PM, made to trap particulate matter, was launched.

In 2022, the first Aerobar in the USA was installed in Las Vegas, followed by a second in Biloxi, Mississippi, after the launch in 2021 of an Aerobar on Sentosa Island in Singapore.

In 2023, the Para-PM was tested on a playground at a school 9th arrondissement of Paris, before it was installed on the subways platforms in Lyon and Lille. The SOLIDEO made a request for proposal which lead the company to design and build five giant air purifiers shaped as flying saucers. Those were installed between the Olympic Village and the A86 autoroute.

In 2023, the Company celebrated its 30th anniversary.

During the year 2024, Aerophile built and managed the Summer Olympics and Paralympics cauldron which was installed in the Tuileries Garden.

The Parc du Petit Prince was sold to the polish group Ptak in February 2025.

The company currently runs seven Aero30NG balloons: Paris Balloon, one at Disneyland Paris, one in Walt Disney World Resort, one in the Orange County Great Park, one in the San Diego Zoo Safari Park, one in the Angkor temples in Cambodia and the one that lifted the 2024 Summer Olympics flame.

=== Subsidiaries ===
The Aerogroupe company has several subsidiaries:

- Aerophile SA, the principal subsidiary (Balloon's manufacture and sale).
- Aeroparis to operate the Paris Balloon.
- Aeromobile to operate the balloon at Irvine.
- Aerotourism to operate the balloon at Disneyland Paris.
- Aerophile Orlando to operate the balloon at Walt Disney World Resort.

== Balloons ==
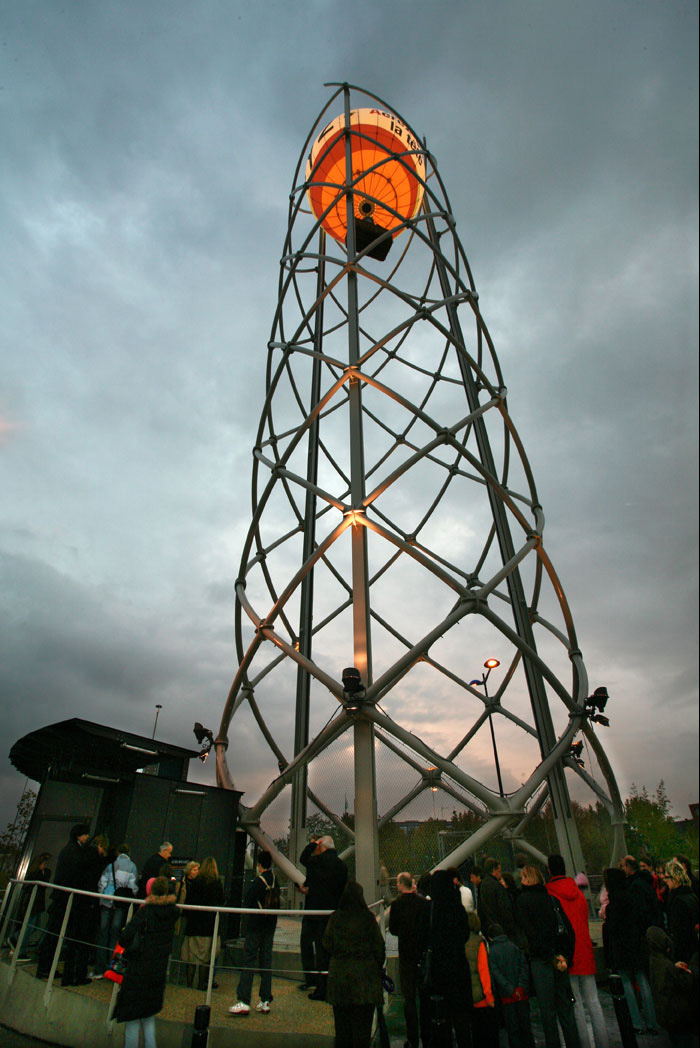
The Aerophare, Evry2, France.

The Aero30NG is a tethered balloon that is 22.5 meters (74 ft) in diameter. It can take up to 30 people at a time in its nacelle, rising up to 150 (500 ft) or 300 meters (980 ft). Its winch system ensures a climb speed of 0.8 metres per second (2.6 ft/s), and its patented platform optimizes landings. This balloon has been installed over five continents in about 40 countries.

Current fleet of 25 balloons Aero30NG in operation, with date of beginning:

- Paris (France), 1999
- Berlin (Germany), 2000
- Angkor Vat (Cambodia), 2003
- San Diego Zoo Safari Park, California (US), 2005
- Disneyland Paris (France), 2005
- Irvine, California (US), 2007
- Walt Disney World Orlando, Florida (US), 2009
- Conner Prairie, Indiana (US), 2009
- Parc du Petit Prince - Little Prince Park (France), 2014
- Suwon (South Korea), 2016
- Jayuya (Puerto Rico), 2017
- CocoCay (Bahamas), 2019
- Kraków (Poland), 2019
- Tbilisi (Georgia), 2020
- Budapest (Hungary), 2022
- Puerto Vallarta (Mexico), 2023
- Dubai (UAE), 2023
- Seville (Spain), 2023
- Petra (Jordan), 2023
- Seoul (South Korea), 2024
- Niagara Falls (US), 2024
- Olympic cauldron, Paris (France), summer 2024, 2025, 2026
- Junglia Okinawa (Japan), 2025
- Osaka Sakai (Japan), 2025
- Nantou (Taiwan), 2026

This model has also been adapted to allow parachute jumps as part of military training in Yemen.

The Aerophare is a balloon operating within a 54 metres (177 ft) tower structure. The structure allows it to operate worse weather than a conventional tethered balloon.

The Aerobar is an aerial bar. This new concept allows 15 individuals to rise up to 120 feet (37 m) in the sky while enjoying their favorite drink. Visitors experience triple emotions: the chills of seeing the ground away from their feet; great views while discovering the scenery and the canopy of heaven meeting the earth in a full 360° circle; and the conviviality with the other passengers that share a drink aboard this aerial bar.

The first Aerobar was installed in 2013 at Futuroscope, which is considered one of the best theme parks in France.
