= Écomusée d'Alsace =

- Écomusée d'Alsace
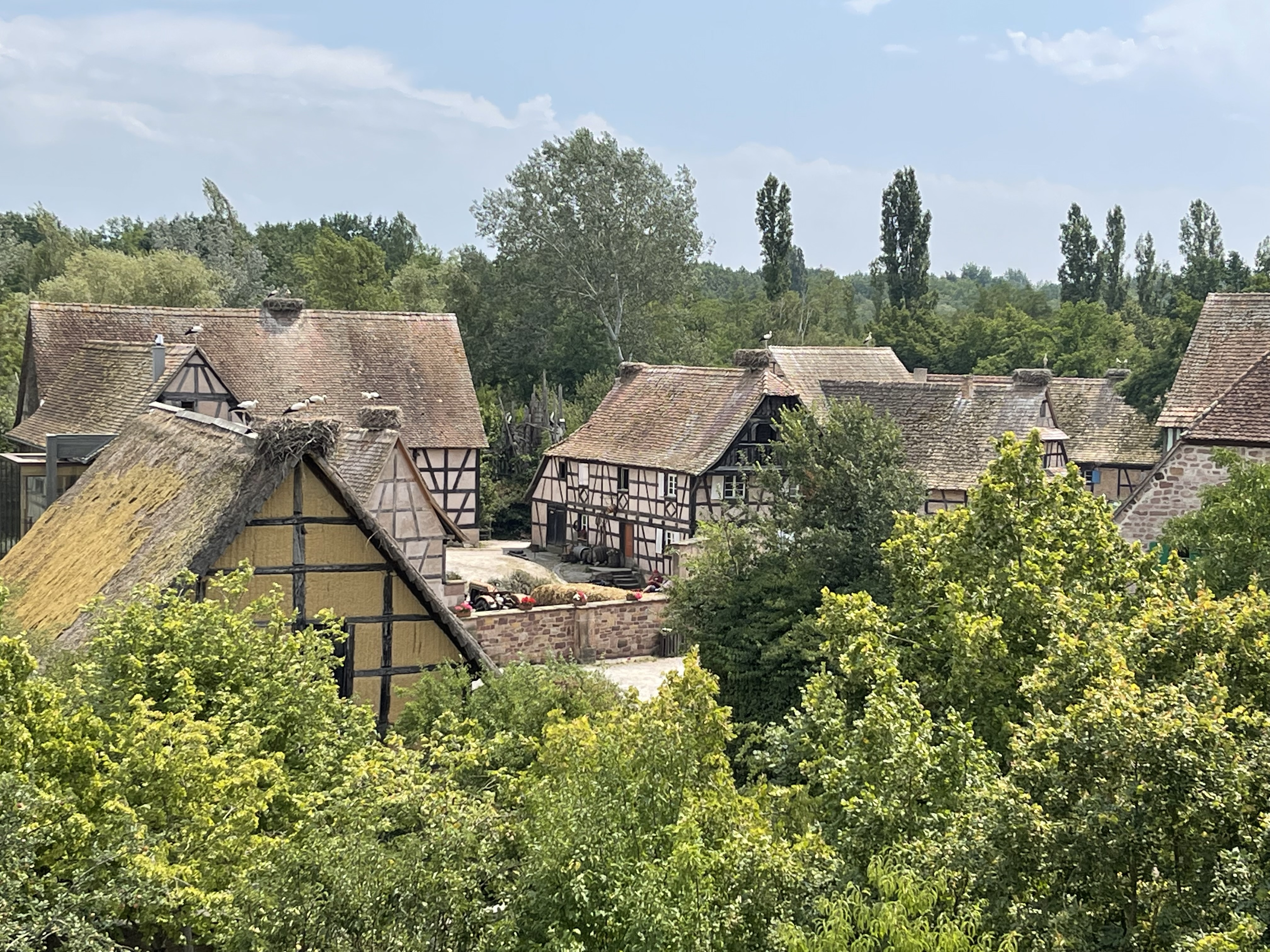
- Location: Ungersheim, Grand Est, France
- Coordinates: 47.8525°N 7.2873°E
- Type: Open-air museum

The Écomusée d'Alsace is an open-air museum located in Ungersheim, Grand Est in France which claims to be the country's largest. It showcases 80 houses, barns, and other historic rural buildings from across Alsace. It is a Museum of France (Musée de France).
