= Allsopp Helikite =

British kite balloon

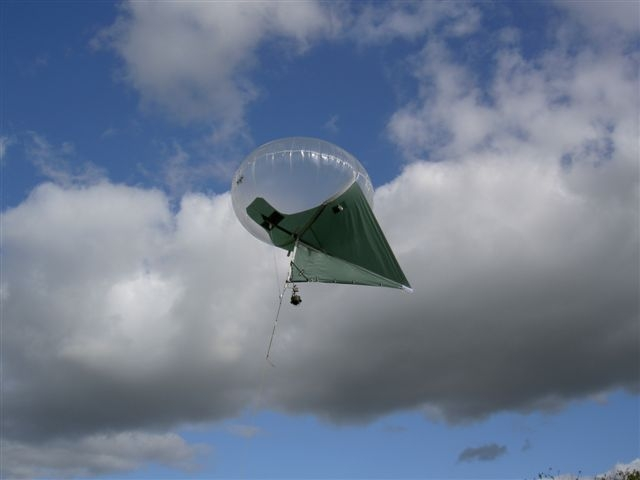
A Helikite lifting a gyro-stabilized camera

The Allsopp Helikite is a kite balloon or kytoon designed by Sandy Allsopp in the United Kingdom in 1993. This Helikite comprises a combination of a helium balloon and a kite to form a single, aerodynamically sound, tethered aircraft, that uses both wind and helium for its lift.

== Design ==
The Helikite, created by Allsopp Helikites Ltd., comprises a semi-rigid helium-filled balloon, having a rigid carbon-fiber spine, with the balloon being shaped aerodynamically. The balloon is generally oblate-spheroid in shape in which solid spars provide attachment points for payload equipment.

In most winds, the aerodynamic lift is greater than the aerostatic lift from the helium.

The Helikite design is intended for all-weather, high-altitude operations. The balloon's shape allows it to be flown in any weather or for altitudes up to 7000 feet. In wind, both the main aerodynamic lift and the aerostatic lift are at the front, while the spar weight and keel are at the stern.

This gives Helikites various advantages over traditional aerostats. Traditional aerostats need to use relatively low-lift helium gas to combat high winds, which means they need to have a lot of gas to cope and so are very large, unwieldy, and expensive. Because Helikites use wind lifts, they only need to be a fraction of the size of traditional aerostats to operate in high winds. Helikites fly at many times higher altitudes than traditional aerostats of the same size. Being smaller, with fewer construction seams, means Helikites have minimal problems with gas leakage compared to traditional aerostats, so Helikites use far less helium.

Helikites do not need ballonets and so are simpler in construction than traditional aerostats, as Helikites do not need constant electrical power to keep them airborne. Helikites are also extremely stable and so are good aerial platforms for cameras or scientific instruments. Tiny Helikites will fly in all weathers, so these sizes are popular as they are very reliable but still easy to handle and do not require large expensive winches. Helikites can be small enough to fit fully inflated in a car but they can also be made large if heavy payloads are required to be flown to higher altitudes. Helikites are one of the most popular aerostat designs and are widely used by the scientific community, military, photographers, geographers, police, and first responders. Helikites are used by telecom companies to lift 4G and 5G base stations for areas without cellphone coverage.

Helikites range in size from 1 meter (gas volume 0.13m3) with a pure helium lift of 30g, up to 14 meters, (gas volume 250m3) able to lift 117 kg. Small Helikites can fly up to 1,000 feet altitude; medium-sized Helikites, up to 3,000 feet altitude; and large Helikites, up to 7,000 feet altitude.

== Classification ==
A Helikite is a new type of tethered aerostat with its own official classification, distinct from any type of balloon.

The US Customs classifies a Helikite as "other non-powered aircraft", while the British Civil Aviation Authority's Air Navigation Order has created its own classification of "Helikites" as distinct from "kites" and "balloons".

Customs authorities classify the Helikite as a type of kite because of the considerable positive aerodynamic uplift in wind.

== Operation ==
Helikites are used for aerial photography, lifting antennas, radio-relay, advertising, agricultural bird-control, position marking, and meteorology. The military also use Helikites as jungle marker balloons, for lifting radio-relays, and raising surveillance equipment.

45m3 Desert Star Helikites flown from Rapid-Response Helikite Launch Trailers are used by British Telecom to lift 4G base stations to supply cellphone coverage for emergencies, temporary events and blackspot areas.

After various sea-trials by Norwegian and British oil-spill response organizations, they determined that Helikites were the only compact aerostat capable of reliably operating at sea for their purposes. For this reason, small rapid-response surveillance Helikites are part of the emergency oil-spill response system of Scandinavia and the UK for operations in the Arctic Ocean.

Due to their stability, Helikites are capable of successfully operating non-gyrostabilised cameras.

The British Army military Helikite surveillance system has 34 m^{3} volume and lifts a lightweight gyro camera with EO/IR capabilities. The US surveillance Helikites are 75 m^{3} and carries a larger gyro camera system and targeting equipment. These aerostats outperform a conventional aerostat of twice the size. These Helikites can lift surveillance equipment above the range of small arms fire, effectively making Helikites unassailable to most common threats.

The smallest Helikite ever made was of just 0.028 m^{3} (1 cubic ft). It flew well despite its tiny size. The largest Helikite made so far is 250 m^{3} (8,750) cubic ft which has a net helium lift of 117 kg. This has been used by the Max Planck Institute for flights up to 7,000ft for cloud droplet research, flying from ocean research ships steaming across the Atlantic.

== See also ==
- Kite types
