= Ungersheim =

Commune in Grand Est, France

Ungersheim Ungersche
- Commune
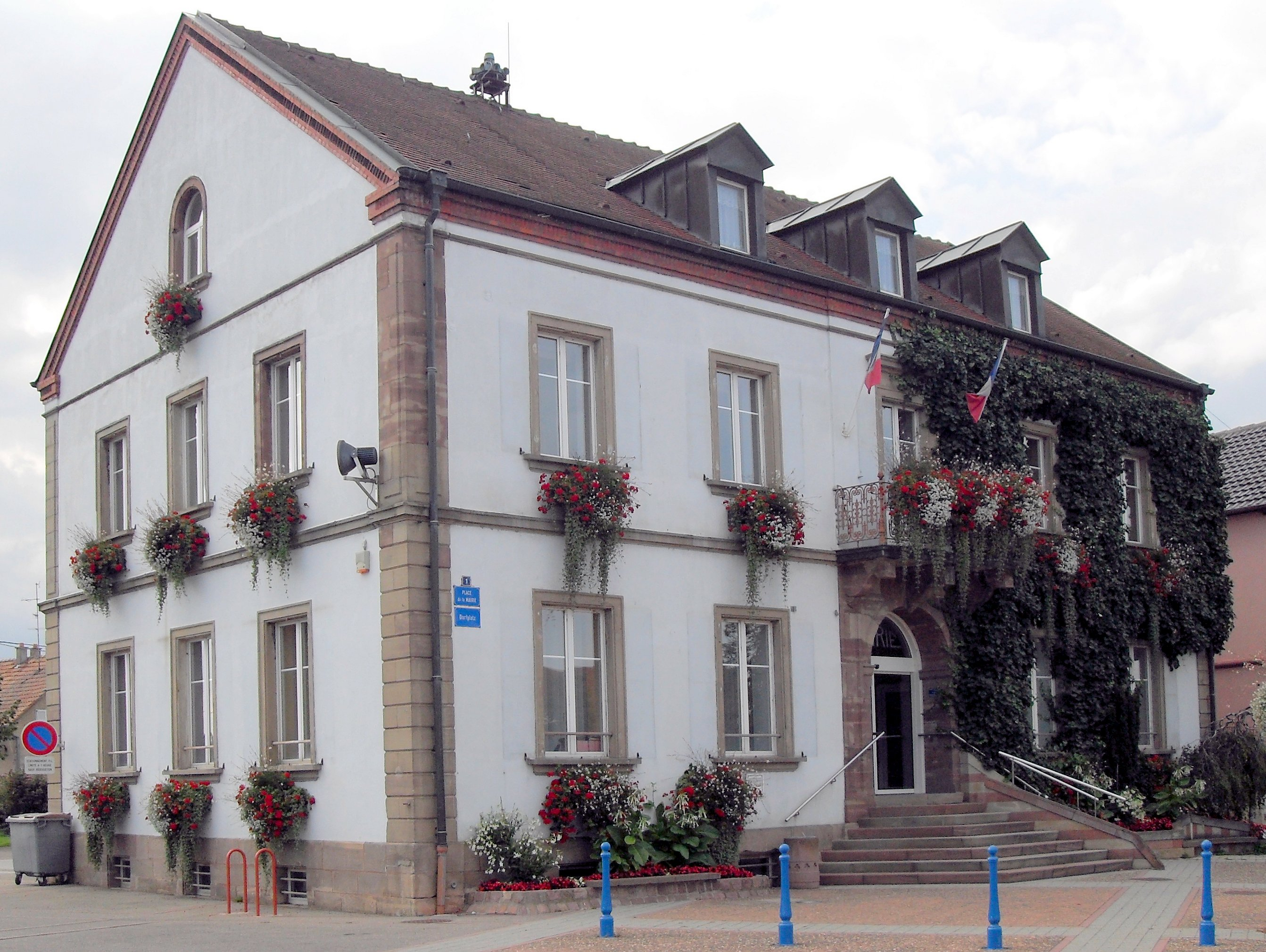
- The town hall in Ungersheim

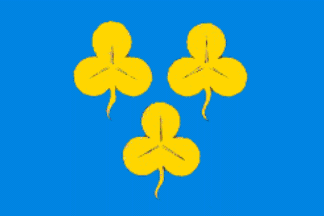
- Flag Coat of arms
- Location of Ungersheim
- Location within France Location within Grand Est
- Coordinates: 47°52′46″N 7°18′19″E
- Country: France
- Region: Grand Est
- Department: Haut-Rhin
- Arrondissement: Mulhouse
- Canton: Wittenheim
- Intercommunality: Mulhouse Alsace Agglomération

Government
  - Mayor (2020–2026): Jean-Claude Mensch
- Area^{1}: 13.51 km^{2} (5.22 sq mi)
- Elevation: 220 m (720 ft)
- Highest elevation: 241 m (791 ft)
- Lowest elevation: 212 m (696 ft)
- Population (2023): 2,449
  - Density: 181.3/km^{2} (469.5/sq mi)
- Time zone: UTC+01:00 (CET)
  - Summer (DST): UTC+02:00 (CEST)
- INSEE/Postal code: 68343 /68190
- ^{1} French Land Register data, which excludes lakes, ponds, glaciers > 1 km^{2} (0.386 sq mi or 247 acres) and river estuaries.

Ungersheim (French pronunciation: [uŋ(ɡ)əʁsaim]; Alemannic German: Ungersche) is a commune in the Haut-Rhin department of Grand Est in eastern France. It forms part of the Mulhouse Alsace Agglomération, the inter-communal local government body for the Mulhouse conurbation.

It is known for:

- the Écomusée d'Alsace, an open-air museum showing:
  - 70 old, rebuilt Alsatian-style houses;
  - many workshops of local traditional crafts with working craftspeople;
  - the "Eden Palladium", a unique museum of old-timer carrousels and attractions still working;
- "Le Bioscope", a leisure park dedicated to environmental questions, proposing amusing and educating activities.

== Population ==
Historical population
Year	Pop.	±% p.a.
1968	1,113	—
1975	1,280	+2.02%
1982	1,430	+1.60%
1990	1,457	+0.23%
1999	1,633	+1.28%
2007	1,991	+2.51%
2012	2,062	+0.70%
2017	2,341	+2.57%
2023	2,449	+0.75%
Source: INSEE

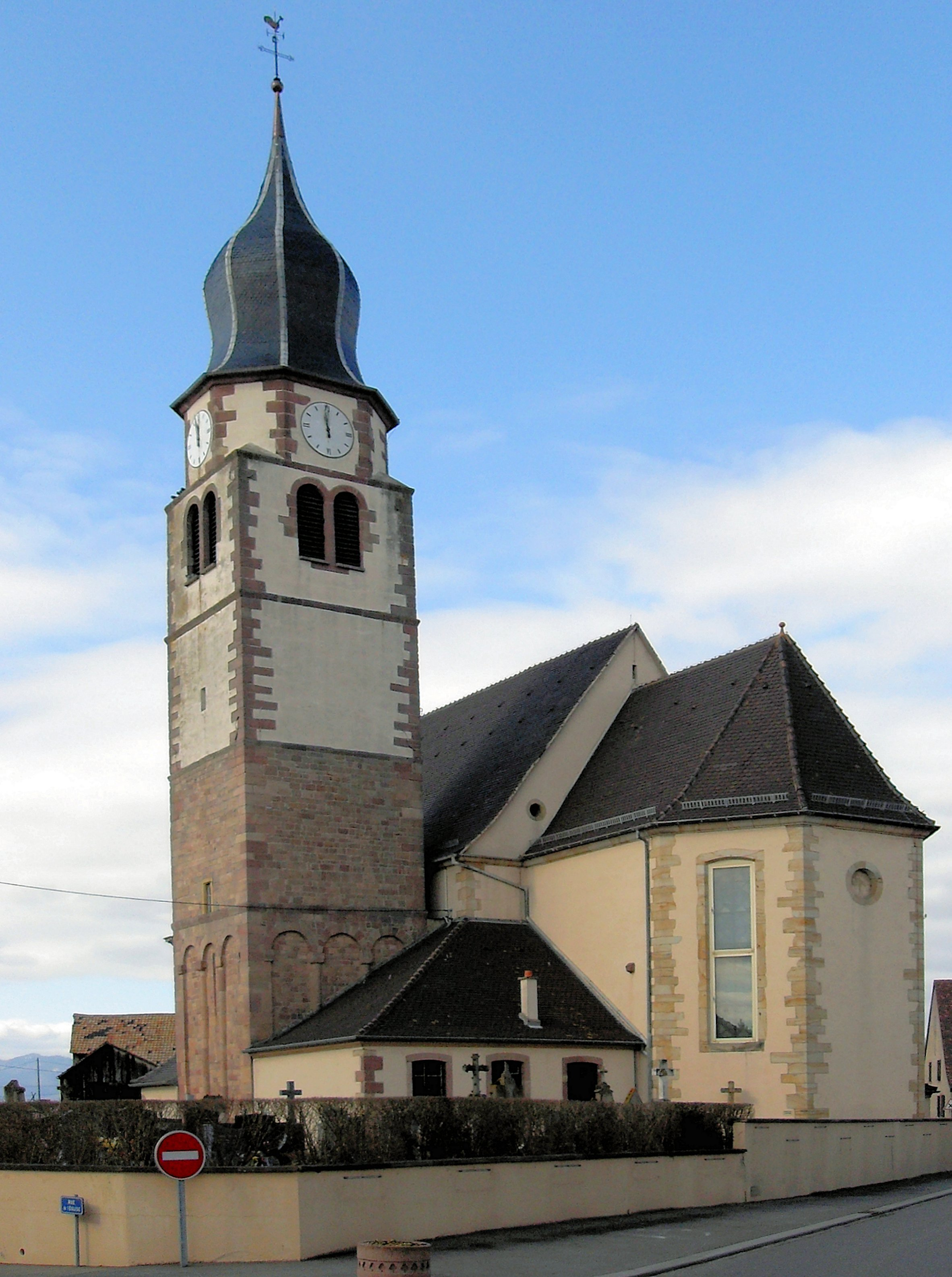
Saint Michael Church

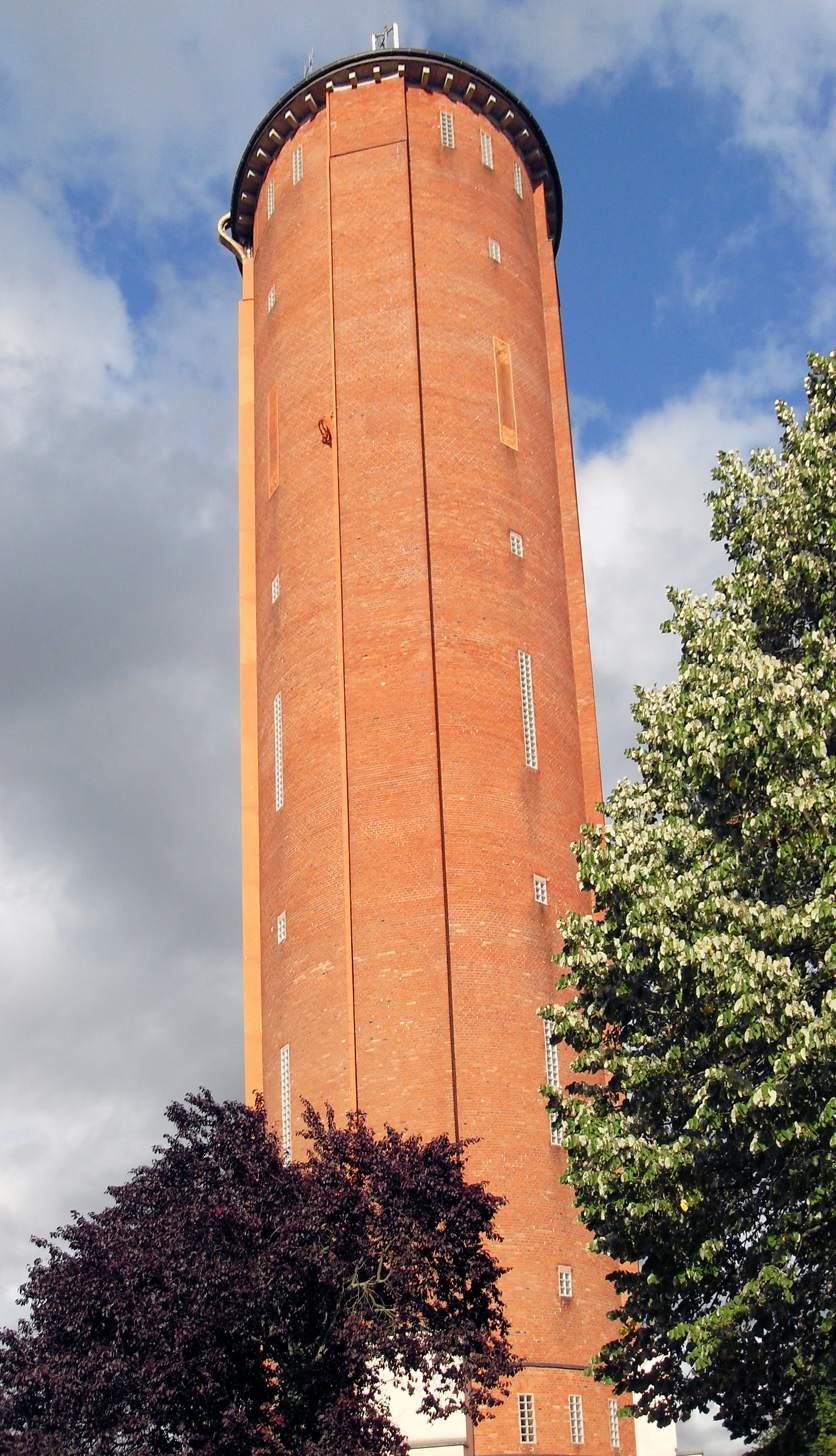
Silo of EAGGF

== See also ==
- Communes of the Haut-Rhin department
