= Le Bioscope =

Former theme park in Ungersheim, France

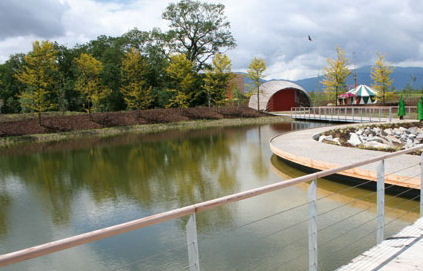
- Interactive map of Le Bioscope
- Location: Ungersheim, France
- Coordinates: 47°51′38″N 7°17′50″E
- Opened: 1 June 2006
- Closed: 30 September 2012

Le Bioscope is a former theme park at Ungersheim, in the Upper Rhine (the Haut-Rhin département) of France. The 12½-hectare(31 acre) park – described in a European Commission 2004 press release as a place where visitors learn about health, life and the environment "whilst having fun" – is laid out in concentric circles, a design by Frédéric Jung meant to evoke the shockwaves caused by the impact of the Ensisheim meteorite, which struck nearby in 1492.

The Alsace region first proposed the park in 1994. Bright White, a York-based firm, was responsible for "development, engineering and project management of the design phase", with the idea of meeting the park's goal to educate people "to take responsibility for their own actions with respect to equilibrium with the environment."

The park closed in September 2012.

== Operation ==
Bioscope was built and is operated as a public-private partnership, with government financing the purchase of the land and part of the construction, and a private company being granted a 30-year concession to build and operate the park. In exchange, the concession holder pays a fee based on turnover.

In July 2001, the Alsace region and the General Council of the Haut-Rhin announced their decision to grant the concession to Grévin & Cie, the company that operates facilities such as Musée Grévin, Parc Astérix, and the Dolfinarium in Harderwijk.
