= Tethered balloon =

Hot air balloon attached to the ground

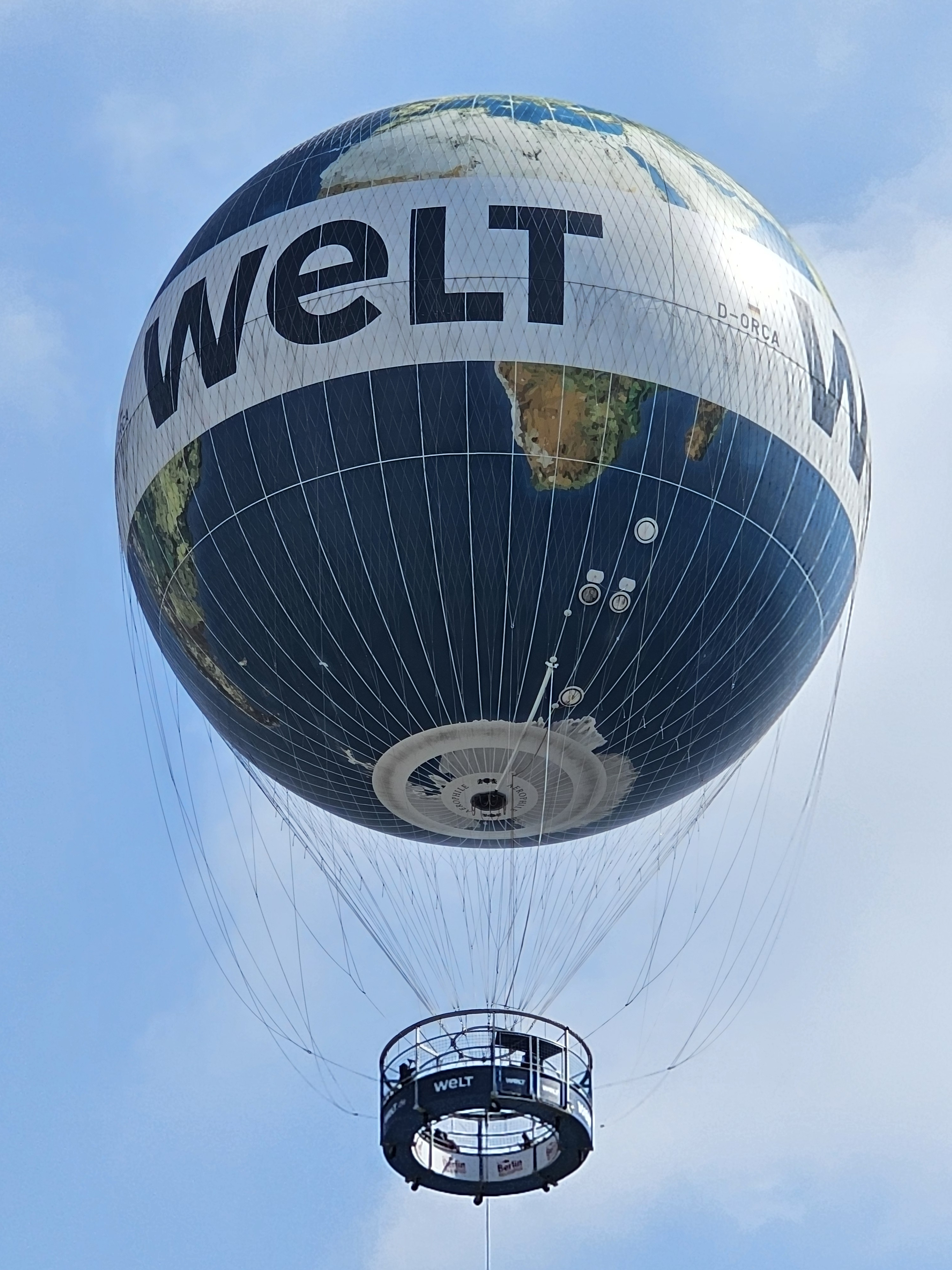
Tethered balloon over Berlin, 2026

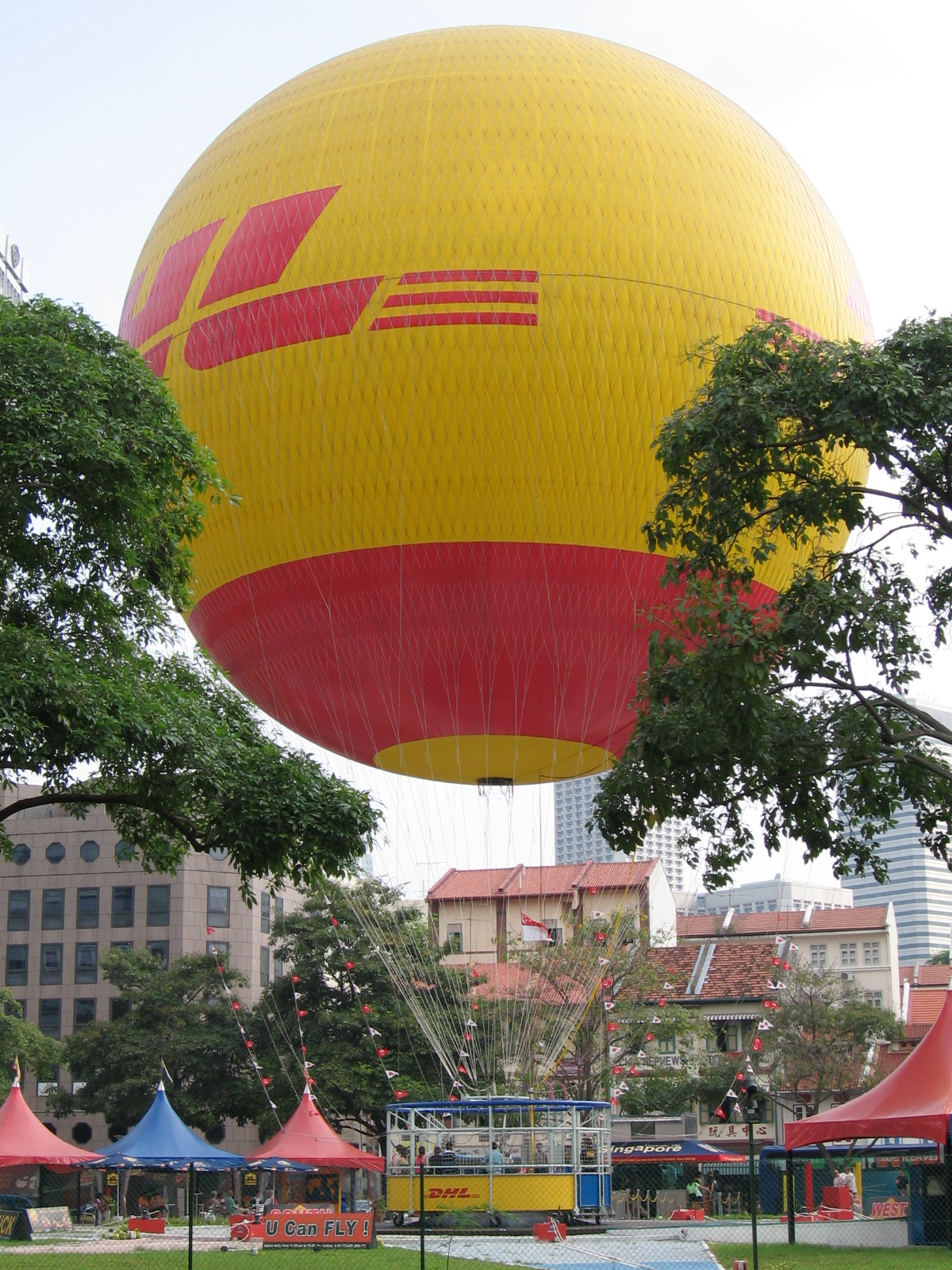
The DHL Balloon was the world's second largest tethered helium balloon

A tethered, moored or captive balloon is a balloon that is restrained by one or more tethers attached to the ground so it cannot float freely. The base of the tether is wound around the drum of a winch, which may be fixed or mounted on a vehicle, and is used to raise and lower the balloon.

A balloon is a form of aerostat, along with the powered free-flying airship, although the American GAO has used the term "aerostat" to describe a tethered balloon in contrast to the powered airship.

Tethered balloons have been used for advertising, recreation, observation, and civil or military uses.

== Design principles ==
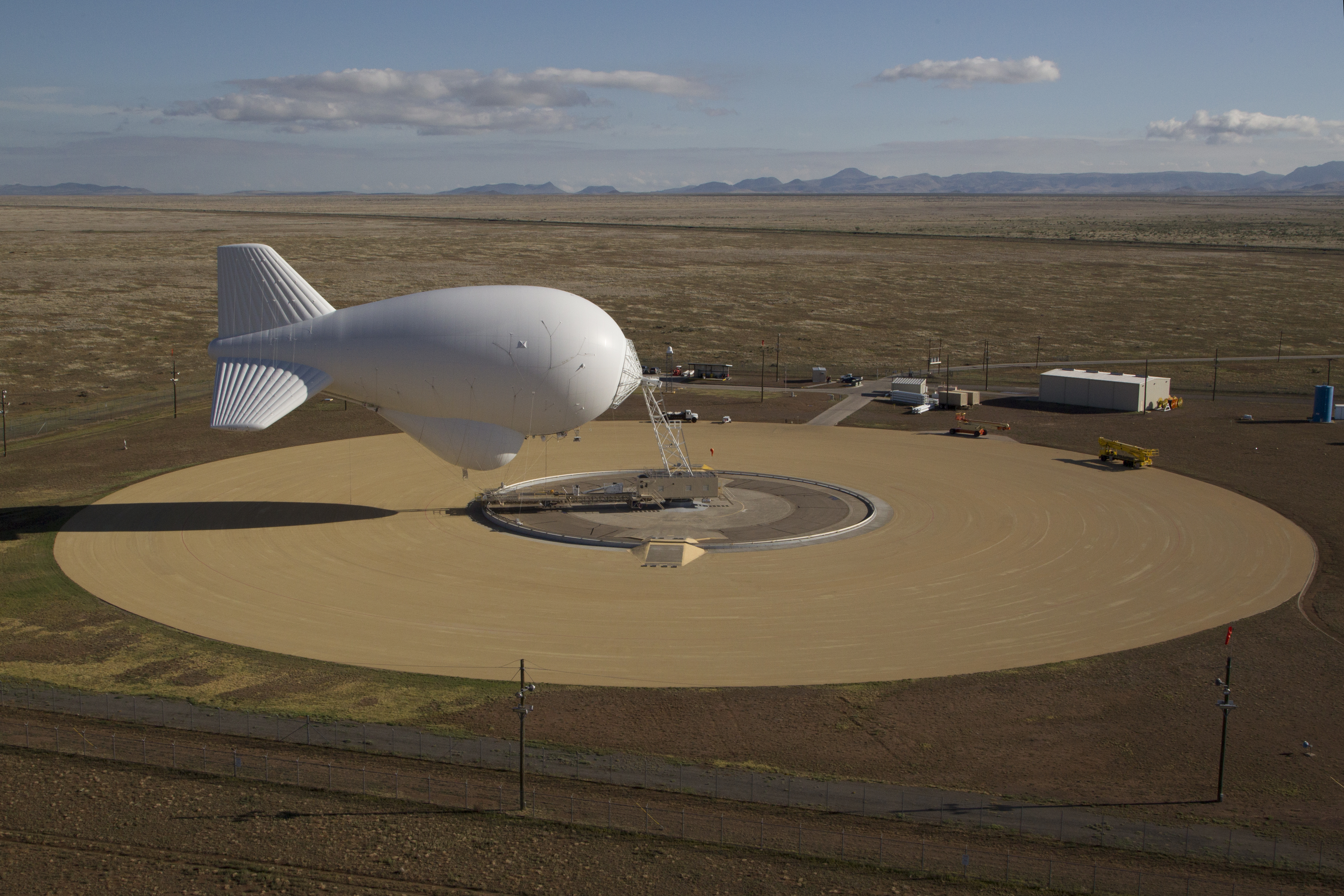
Tethered Aerostat Radar System American (TARS) aerostat

Early balloons were simple round spheres, with a payload hung beneath. The round shape uses the minimum material to accommodate a given volume of lifting gas, making it the lightest construction. However, in any significant wind the round shape is aerodynamically unstable and will bob about, risking damage or the balloon breaking free.

To avoid this problem, the kite balloon was developed. This form has an elongated shape to reduce wind resistance and some form of tail surface to stabilize it so that it always points into the wind. Like the powered airship, such balloons are often called blimps.

A hybrid tethered balloon or kytoon is shaped to provide aerodynamic lift similar to a kite, as well as to reduce drag.

== History ==
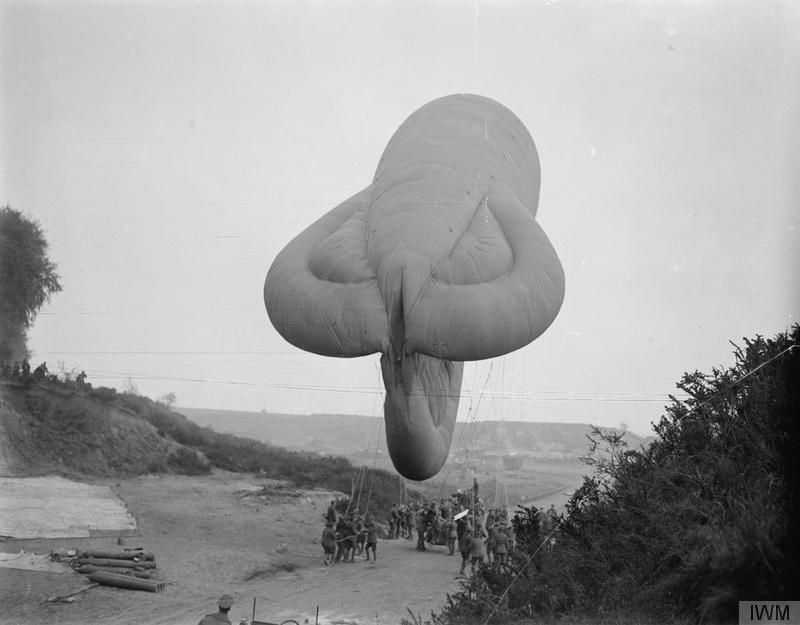
RAF Caquot kite balloon in 1918

Designed by Albert Caquot, a French engineer, in 1914, the barrage balloons of World War I and World War II were early examples of tethered balloons. Military observation balloons were also used extensively in World War I. These early types used hydrogen as their lifting gas.

Tethered balloons are used for lifting cameras, radio antennas, electro-optical sensors, radio-relay equipment and advertising banners – often for long durations. Tethered balloons are also used for position marking and bird control work. Typically, they use non-flammable helium gas to provide lift.

== Modern use ==
=== Advertising ===
Tethered balloons are often used for advertising, either by lifting advertisement signs, or by using a balloon with advertisements written on, or attached to it. Often both methods are combined. It is not uncommon to use specially designed balloons. Blimp-shaped balloons are especially popular for advertising use. By suspending a light source within the envelope, the balloon can be illuminated at night, drawing attention to its message.

=== Earth sciences ===
The United States Geological Survey uses tethered balloons to carry equipment to places where conventional aircraft cannot go, such as above an erupting volcano. Tethered balloons are ideal as they can easily remain more or less in one place, are less likely to be damaged by volcanic ash, and are less expensive to operate than a helicopter.

=== Leisure ===
Tethered balloons are frequently used as a recreational attraction.

=== Telecommunications ===
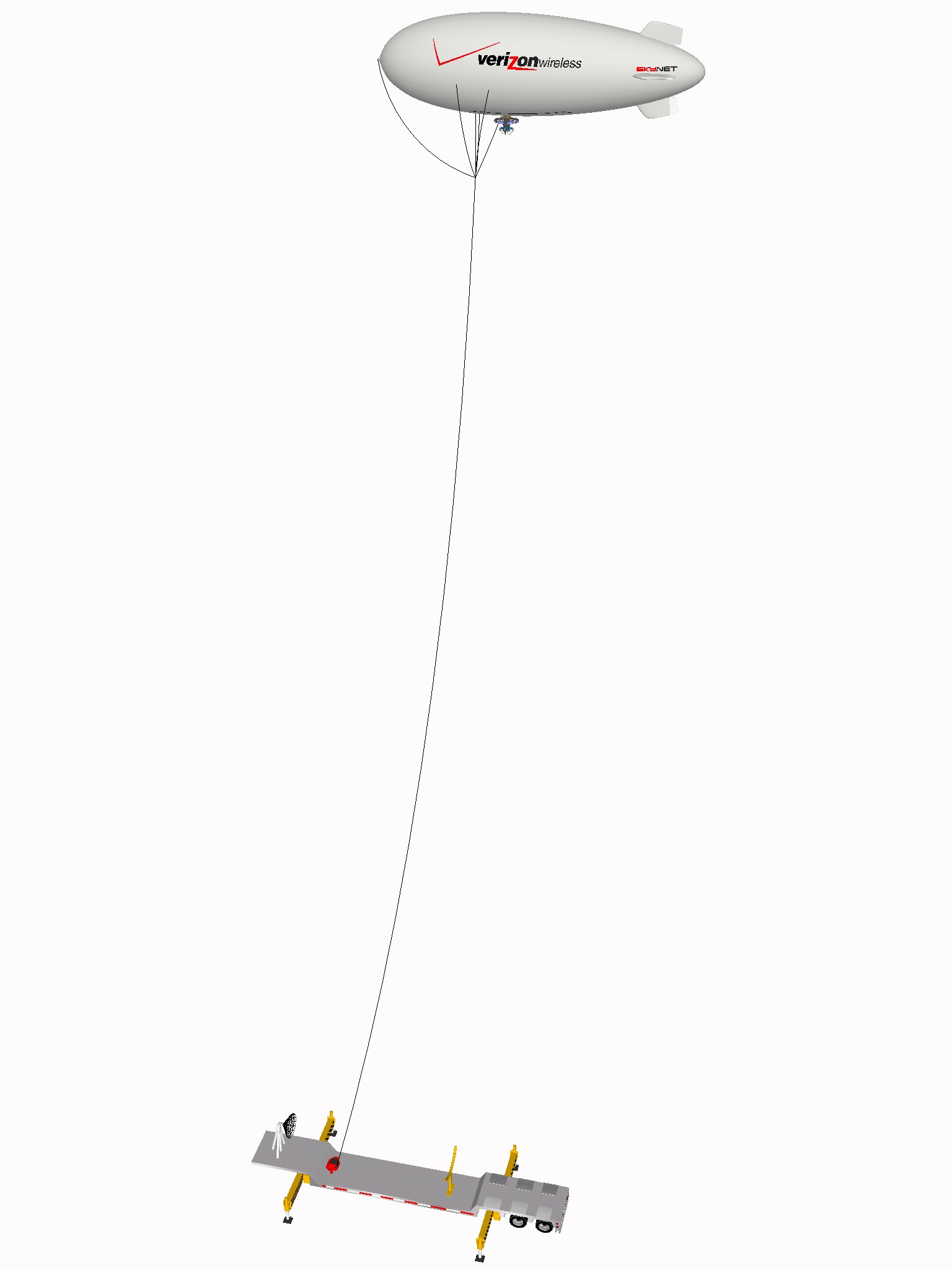
Tethered blimp-shaped balloon for telecommunications

Tethered balloons can be used as temporary transmitters, instead of a radio mast, either by using the tether which holds the balloon as the antenna, or by carrying antennas on the balloon fed by a fiber optic or radio frequency cable contained inside the tether. The advantage of tethered balloons is that great antenna heights are easily attainable and they are significantly cheaper than erecting a temporary mast. This allows for more localized coverage with a high capacity within an 80-kilometer (50 mi) radius of the balloon at an altitude between 450 and 600 m (1,500 and 2,000 feet) above ground level.

Tethered balloons or blimps have been studied to overcome the limitations of terrestrial cell towers for telecommunications. Because of their higher elevation they can provide a larger coverage area and better line of sight, would be more economical and would have better latency than satellite systems.

=== Security and defense ===
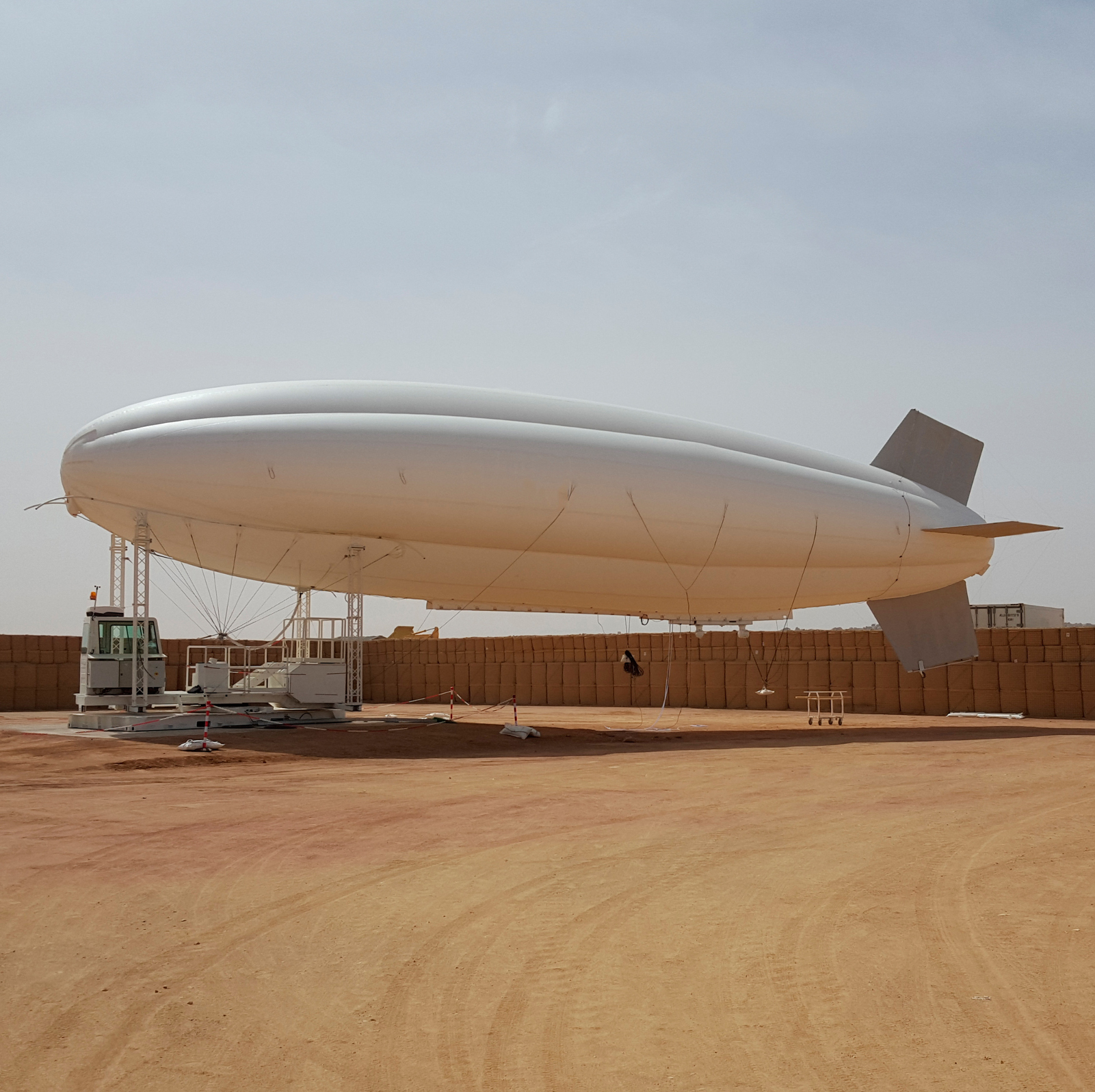
Tethered blimp-shaped balloon used for military camp protection. Aerostat manufactured by A-NSE.

During the 1990 Invasion of Kuwait, the first indication of the Iraqi ground advance was from a radar-equipped tethered balloon that detected Iraqi armor and air assets moving south. Tethered surveillance balloons were used in the 2004 American occupation of Iraq. They utilized a high-tech optics system to detect and observe enemies from miles away. They have been used to over watch foot patrols and convoys in Baghdad, Afghanistan, and are permanently installed above US military bases in Kabul and Bagram.

The US Drug Enforcement Administration has contracted with Lockheed Martin to operate a series of radar-equipped tethered balloons to detect low-flying aircraft attempting to enter the United States. A total of twelve tethered balloons, called Tethered Aerostat Radar System (TARS), are positioned approximately 350 miles (550 km) apart, from California to Florida to Puerto Rico, providing unbroken radar coverage along the entire southern border of the US.

The U.S. Army has developed a tethered aerostat to perform operational testing at Aberdeen Proving Ground beginning in 2015. The system, called JLENS, uses two moored balloons designed to provide over-the-horizon missile defense capability.

In Israeli a tethered aerostat missile detection system called Sky Dew, similar to TARS and JLENS, has been in use since 2022.

== Challenges ==
There have been a small number of incidents involving Tethered Helium Balloons including the Aerophile Ocean Park Balloon incident in 2012 resulting in the grounding of Aerophile Balloons worldwide.

=== Ukraine (2023–present) ===
The full-scale Russian invasion of Ukraine triggered a significant revival of tethered aerostat technology on the modern battlefield. The proliferation of unmanned aerial vehicles (UAVs) in the conflict created urgent demand for persistent elevated communication infrastructure that ground-based radio could not provide.

In 2023, Kyiv-based company Aerobavovna became the first domestic mass-producer of military tethered aerostat systems in Ukraine. By lifting radio relay payloads to altitudes of up to 1,000 metres, the aerostats extended secure communications range between military units to up to 100 km — far exceeding the line-of-sight limitations of ground-based tactical radios in complex terrain.

By 2025, more than 50 aerostat complexes had been delivered to Ukrainian military formations, including the Special Operations Forces of Ukraine and Security Service of Ukraine. The systems were also used to carry signals intelligence (SIGINT) and electronic warfare (EW) payloads for locating enemy drone operators.

Ukraine's combat experience prompted renewed international interest in tethered aerostats among military planners in the United States, Poland, Israel, and Japan.

== See also ==
- Aerostatics
- Barrage balloons
- Aerophile SA
- Raven Aerostar
- Worldwide Aeros Corp

	Aerostat	Aerodyne		
	Lift: Lighter than air gas	Lift: Fixed wing	Lift: Unpowered rotor	Lift: Powered rotor
Unpowered free flight	(Free) balloon	Glider	Helicopter, etc. in autorotation	(None – see note 2)
Tethered (static or towed)	Tethered balloon	Kite	Rotor kite	(None – see note 2)
Powered	Airship	Airplane, ornithopter, etc.	Autogyro	Gyrodyne, helicopter
