= Airparif =

French air quality monitoring organization

- Founded: 1979
- Type: Non-profit organisation
- Purpose: Air quality monitoring in Paris agglomeration
- Location: Paris, 7 rue Crillon, 75004
- Region served: Île-de-France
- Revenue: € 6.8 million
- Employees: around 60
- Website: airparif.fr

AIRPARIF is an organisation responsible for monitoring air quality in the Paris agglomeration. Founded in 1979, AIRPARIF is approved by the Ministry of Environment for the monitoring of air quality throughout the Ile-de-France, Paris, France.

== Mission ==
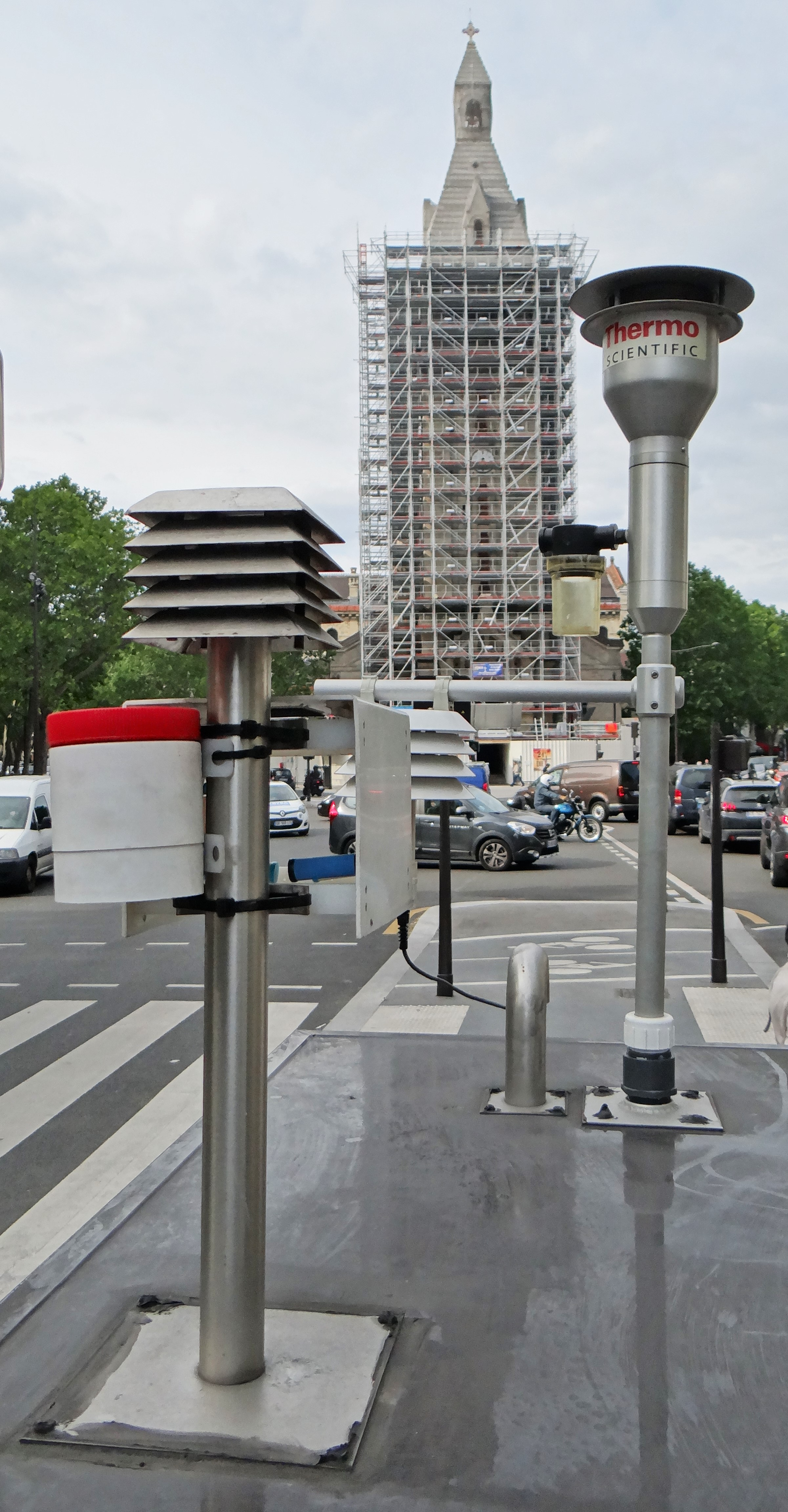
Monitoring in Paris.

According to the 30 December 1996 Law on Air, AIRPARIF is a non-profit organisation accredited by the Ministry of Environment to monitor the air quality in Île-de-France. Its missions meet a regulatory requirement and come in four functions:

- to monitor air quality
- to forecast pollution episodes
- to assess the impact of emission reduction measures
- to inform the authorities and citizens (daily during an occurrence)

AIRPARIF continuously monitors air quality and contributes towards the assessment of health risks and environmental impacts.

In 2015, Airparif found that "levels of PM10 - large particles in the air that can cause severe health problems - were at a dangerous high of 100 micrograms per cubic metre...," leading it to recommend that the French capital drastically reduce its pollution by banning half of its cars.

Paris mayor Anne Hidalgo was instrumental in fulfilling the mandate of that law. In 2025, the agency reported that the air quality of Paris had improved significantly in the past decade.
