= Aerostatics =

Study of gases that are not in motion

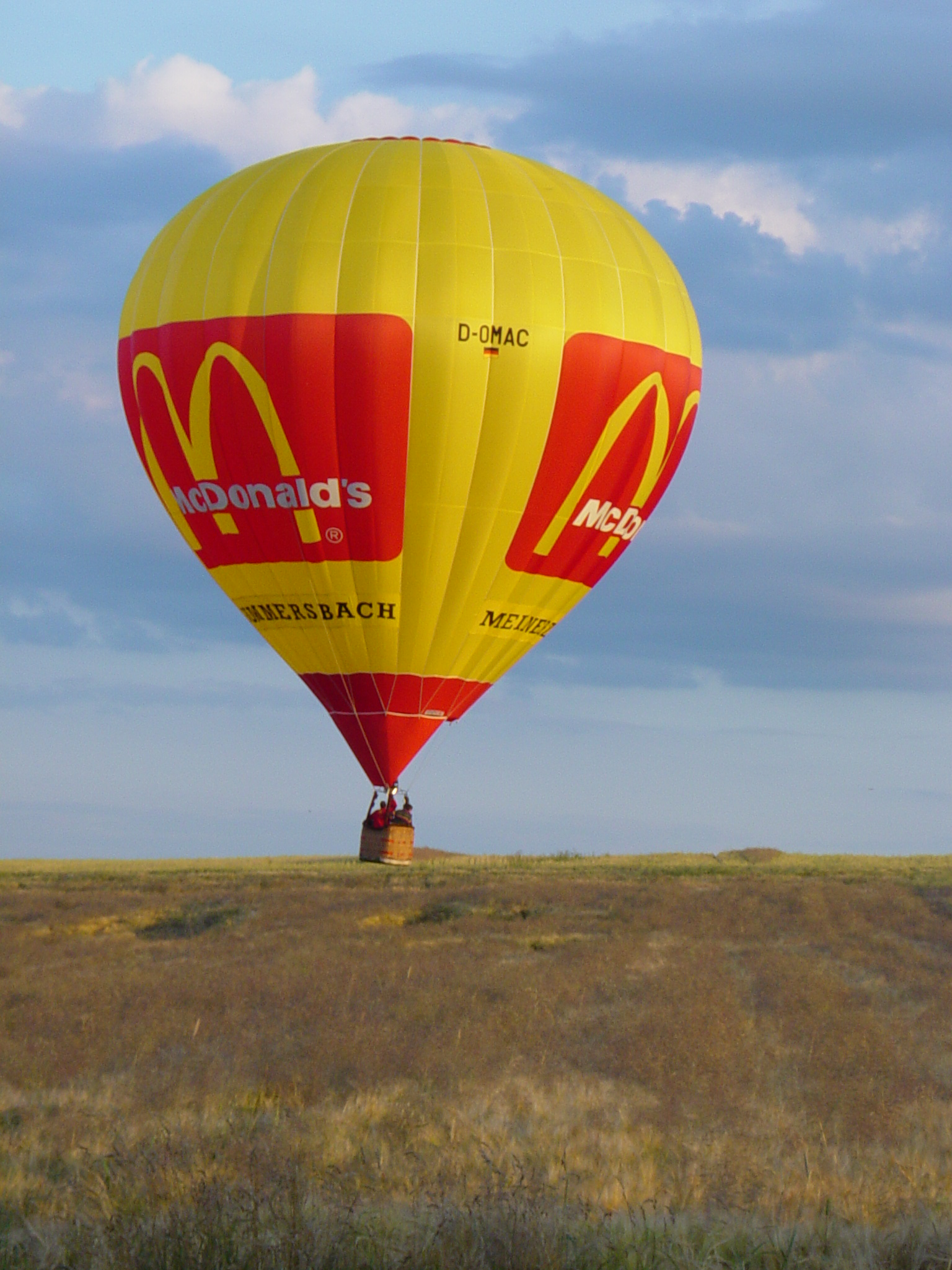
A hot air balloon produced through the application of Aerostatic principles

A subfield of fluid statics, aerostatics is the study of gases that are not in motion with respect to the coordinate system in which they are considered. The corresponding study of gases in motion is called aerodynamics.

Aerostatics studies density allocation, especially in air. One of the applications of this is the barometric formula.

An aerostat is a lighter than air craft, such as an airship or balloon, which uses the principles of aerostatics to float.

== Basic laws ==
Treatment of the equations of gaseous behaviour at rest is generally taken, as in hydrostatics, to begin with a consideration of the general equations of momentum for fluid flow, which can be expressed as:

$\rho [{\partial U_j\over\partial t} + U_i {\partial U_j\over\partial t}] = -{\partial P\over\partial x_j} - {\partial \tau_{ij}\over\partial x_i} + \rho g_j$,

where $\rho$ is the mass density of the fluid, $U_j$ is the instantaneous velocity, $P$ is fluid pressure, $g$ are the external body forces acting on the fluid, and $\tau_{ij}$ is the momentum transport coefficient. As the fluid's static nature mandates that $U_j = 0$, and that $\tau_{ij} = 0$, the following set of partial differential equations representing the basic equations of aerostatics is found.

${\partial P\over\partial x_j} = \rho g_j$

However, the presence of a non-constant density as is found in gaseous fluid systems (due to the compressibility of gases) requires the inclusion of the ideal gas law:

${P\over\rho} = RT$,

where $R$ denotes the universal gas constant, and $T$ the temperature of the gas, in order to render the valid aerostatic partial differential equations:

${\partial P\over\partial x_j} = \rho \hat{g_j} = {P\over\ RT} \hat{g_j}$,

which can be employed to compute the pressure distribution in gases whose thermodynamic states are given by the equation of state for ideal gases.

== Fields of study ==
- Atmospheric pressure fluctuation
- Composition of mountain air
- Cross-section of the atmosphere
- Gas density
- Gas diffusion in soil
- Gas pressure
- Kinetic theory of gases
- Partial pressures in gas mixtures
- Pressure measurement

== See also ==
- Aeronautics
