= High-Capacity Artillery Projectile =

High-Capacity Artillery Projectile (HICAP), a 155 mm two-piece artillery shell, was developed by the U.S. Army from 1992 to 1996.

HICAP was part of a major effort by the U.S. Army – called the Composite Artillery Projectile Program – to develop lightweight ammunition for 155 mm M199 gun tubes. The program sought to replace 155 mm steel shells with a two-piece design permitting the weight savings to be allocated to increased payload or longer range. The project was collaborative effort between the U.S. Army Research Laboratory (ARL) in Aberdeen, MD and the U.S. Army Armament Research, Development, and Engineering Center (ARDEC) in Picatinny Arsenal, NJ. Five HICAP projectiles were successfully tested at the Yuma Proving Ground, AZ in June 1996.

== Background ==
The Army’s early 155 mm artillery had steel bodies and weighed 100 lbs. 65% percent of the weight of the shell was in the steel body. This original design, while durable enough to withstand inertial loads during firing, was limited in the amount of munitions that could be carried within the shell.

During the Composite Artillery Projectile Program, the Army sought to enhance the payload of 155 mm shells while reducing the ammunition’s bulk. A mass-efficient projectile, also called High-Capacity Artillery Projectile, was developed through the use of composite materials, which offered both weight reduction and material strength to withstand severe firing conditions.

While HICAP shell was a lighter ammunition than its predecessor, it lacked the outer shell mass for adequate stability during flight. A deployable fin assembly was designed from 1992 to 1994 at ARL, which included six-blade fins at the base of the shell, allowing the projectile to maintain forward center of gravity after firing.

== Description ==
The HICAP was a two-piece projectile using a six-blade fin configuration. The fins were designed to be stowed in the barrel and deployed from the shell at muzzle exit. The round consisted of two parts, each carrying a full single load of cargo. A quick-connect joint was designed at the center of the round to allow transport of the two pieces. When assembled, HICAP was 72 in long with ½ in wall thickness and weighed 74 lbs.
