= EL/M-2083 =

Airborne early warning and control radar

EL/M-2083
Overview
Primary function	Air search radar
Mass	kg
Height	m
Width	m
Depth	m
Time of service entry	2005
Maximum range	500 km
Maximum detection altitude	ft

The EL/M-2083 is an aerostat-mounted Airborne early warning and control radar. Another system of this kind is the Tethered Aerostat Radar System.

It is an early warning and control active electronically scanned array radar designed to detect hostile approaching aircraft from long ranges, especially when they approach at low altitudes. Data gathered by the radar is transmitted to a central air defense command & control center where it is used to maintain an extended comprehensive air situation picture.

Once a potential threat has been detected the onboard system alerts responders in a timely manner.

Detection range for fighter aircraft is in excess of 250 km (135 Nm).

It is based on the EL/M-2080 Green Pine.

== Operators ==
Israel
India
Philippines
Philippine Navy
Singapore
