= Sky Dew =

Israeli missile defense aerostat

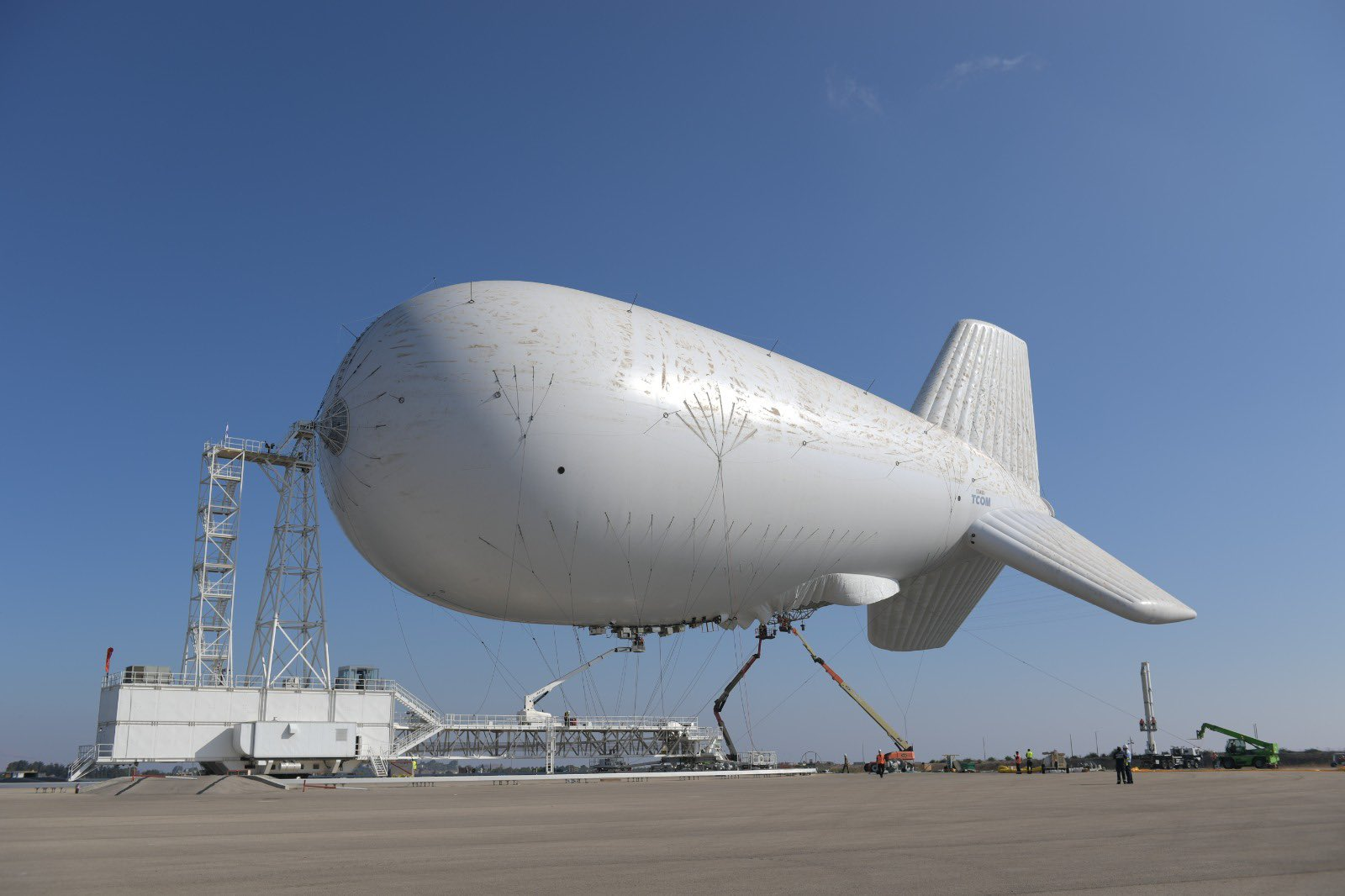
Sky Dew blimp

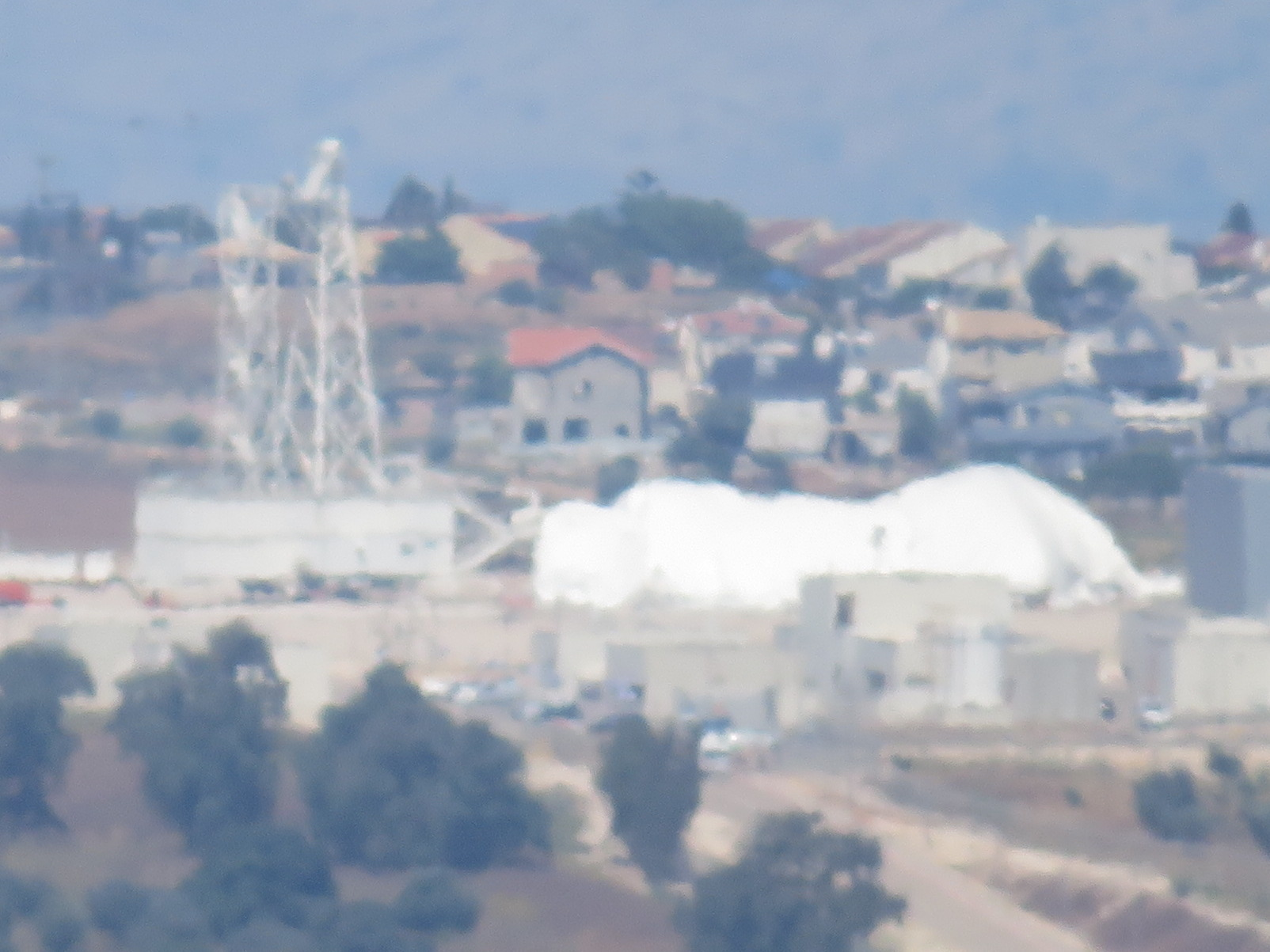
The Aerostat after being hit by Hezbollah

Sky Dew (Tal Shamayim in Hebrew (טל שמיים)), or High Availability Aerostat System (HAAS), is a high altitude missile defense aerostat used by Israel Defence Forces since 2022. The radar system was developed by Israel Missile Defense Organization (IMDO) and the US Missile Defense Agency (MDA). It is a tethered blimp, developed by the US TCOM company. The system is deployed in the north of Israel, a similar balloon is already used in the south. On May 15, 2024, the Aerostat was downed by a Hezbollah drone strike.

== See also ==
- JLENS - Joint Land Attack Cruise Missile Defense Elevated Netted Sensor System (Spy Balloon)
- Tethered Aerostat Radar System
