= Tethered Aerostat Radar System =

Airborne surveillance system in the US

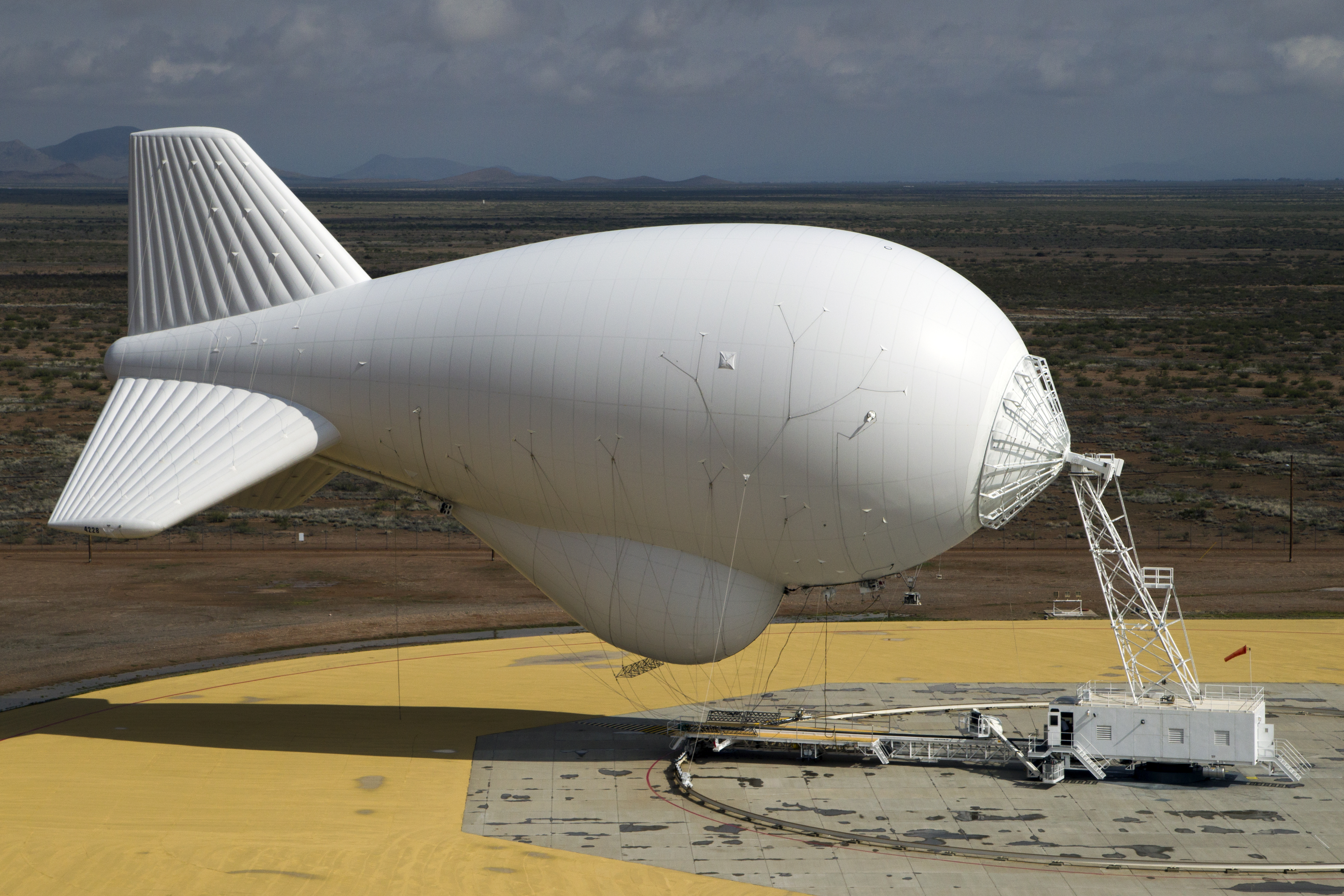
- A Tethered Aerostat Radar System in Deming, New Mexico

General information
- Type: Surveillance
- Manufacturer: Lockheed Martin (prime contractor); ILC Dover (envelope)
- Status: In active service
- Primary users: U.S. Customs and Border Protection; Philippine Navy; Historic users: United States Air Force; United States Coast Guard; United States Customs Service
- Number built: 9 – Lockheed Martin 420K; 2 – Lockheed Martin 275K

History
- Introduction date: 1980

The Tethered Aerostat Radar System (TARS) is an American low-level airborne ground surveillance system that uses aerostats (moored balloons) as radar platforms. Similar systems include the EL/M-2083 and JLENS.

== System ==
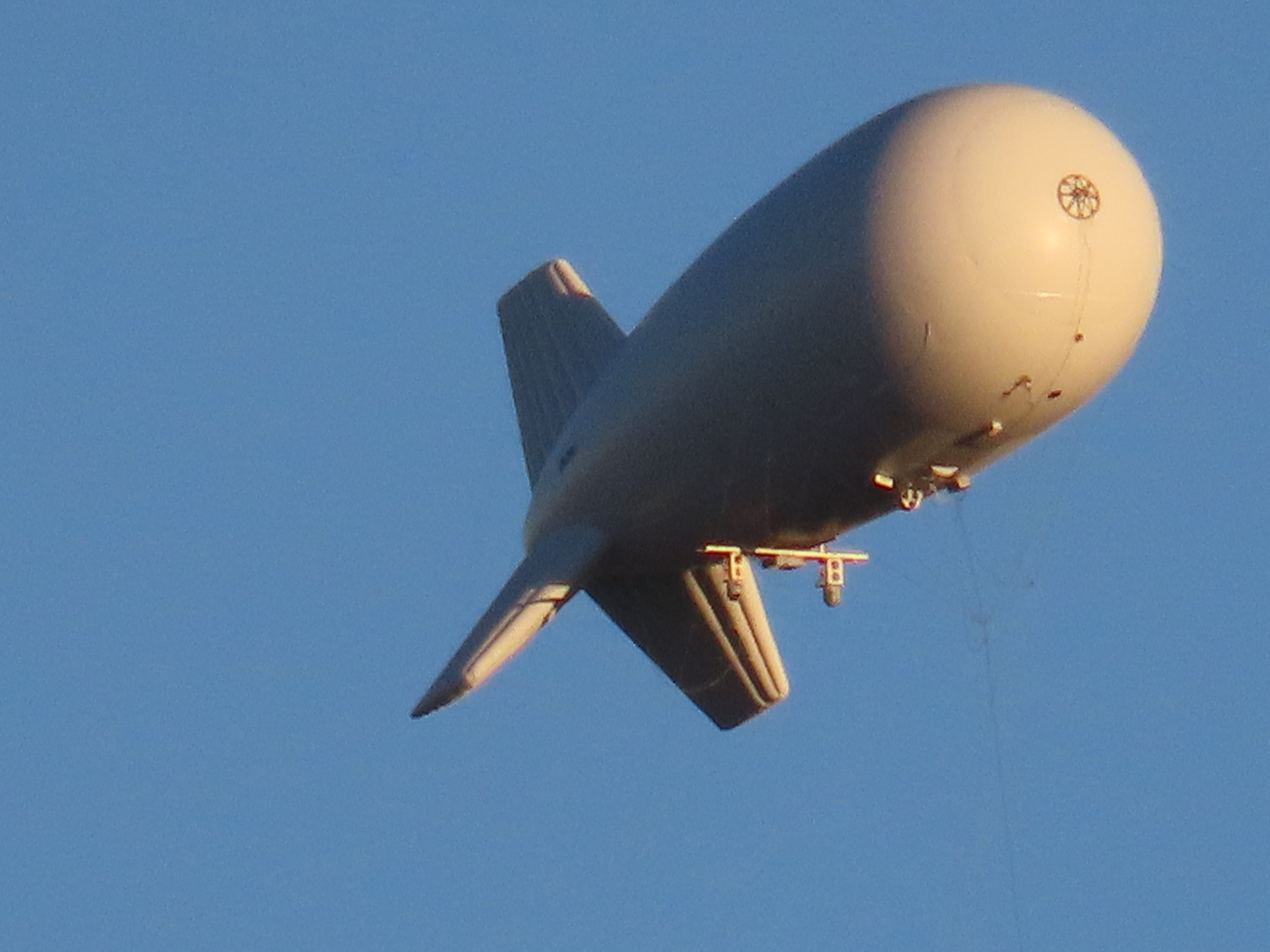
The underside of a tactical Aerostat

The aerostats used in the TARS system are large fabric envelopes filled with helium that can rise to an altitude of 15,000 feet (4,600 m) while tethered by a single cable. The largest lifts a 1,000 kg (2,200 lb) payload to an operating altitude providing low-level, downward-looking radar coverage. The aerostat consists of four major parts or assemblies: the hull and fin, windscreen and radar platform, airborne power generator, and rigging and tether; they are kite balloons obtaining aerodynamic lift from relative wind and buoyancy from being lighter than air.

The hull of the aerostat contains two parts separated by a gas-tight fabric partition. The upper chamber is filled with helium and provides the aerostat's lifting capability. The lower chamber of the hull is a pressurized air compartment. The hull is constructed of a lightweight polyurethane-coated Tedlar fabric. An airborne engine drives the generator, supplied by a 100-gallon diesel fuel tank.

Beginning in the late 1990s, the aerostat sites were equipped with Lockheed Martin 420K aerostats. This version carries the Lockheed Martin L-88, a surveillance radar with a range of 370 km (200 nm), as its primary payload. The 420K's envelope shape, fin design, and cable attachment points are further optimized for high aerodynamic stability and easy ground handling. While Lockheed Martin is the prime contractor for the 420K aerostats, the envelopes are built by ILC Dover.

As of 2004, all TARS sites except one were equipped with the 420K aerostats. The exception is Cudjoe Key, which uses two smaller, but otherwise similar, Lockheed Martin 275K blimps. One carries the L-88(V)3, a light-weight L-88 derivative, while the other is used to transmit the Radio y Televisión Martí propaganda TV program into Cuba.

== History ==
The first aerostats were assigned to the United States Air Force in December 1980 at Cudjoe Key, Florida. During the 1980s, the U.S. Customs Service operated a network of aerostats to help counter illegal drug trafficking. Their first site was built at High Rock, Grand Bahama in 1984. The second site was built at Fort Huachuca, Arizona in 1986. Before 1992, three agencies operated the TARS network: the Air Force, U.S. Customs Service and U.S. Coast Guard.

The overall responsibility for this program fell to Customs and the Coast Guard, until the US Congress in 1991 and 1992 transferred management to the US Department of Defense, with the Air Force as executive agent. In 1991 the US Congress transferred five aerostats to the Department of the Army to be used to do drug enforcement surveillance, primarily in the Gulf of Mexico. However, following that transfer, the Department of Army had them parked, and refused to operate them since January 1992.

Under Air Force management, through contract consolidation and system standardization, the operations and maintenance cost per site was reduced from $6 million in fiscal year 1992 to $3.5 million in 2007.

Since 2003 some 66 Persistent Threat Detection System (PTDS) aerostats have been put into action in Iraq and in Afghanistan for protecting convoys in transit and providing intelligence on enemy troop movements. After success with PTDS, which overlooks cities and large installations, the US Army was interested in fielding a scaled-down, less-expensive system called Persistent Ground Surveillance Systems (PGSS), suitable for smaller forward-operating bases.

The Budget Control Act of 2011 slashed funding for the Air Force, which tried to shut down the project. However, the U.S. Customs and Border Protection (CBP) assumed responsibility for the Tethered Aerostat Radar System (TARS) project and has maintained its funding since fiscal year 2014.

The Philippine Navy (PN) formally received a 28M Class Tethered Aerostat Radar System (TARS) from the United States government in a turn-over ceremony on August 22, 2017 at the Naval Education and Training Command (NETC) inside Naval Station Leovigildo Gantioqui in San Antonio, Zambales.

== Operation ==
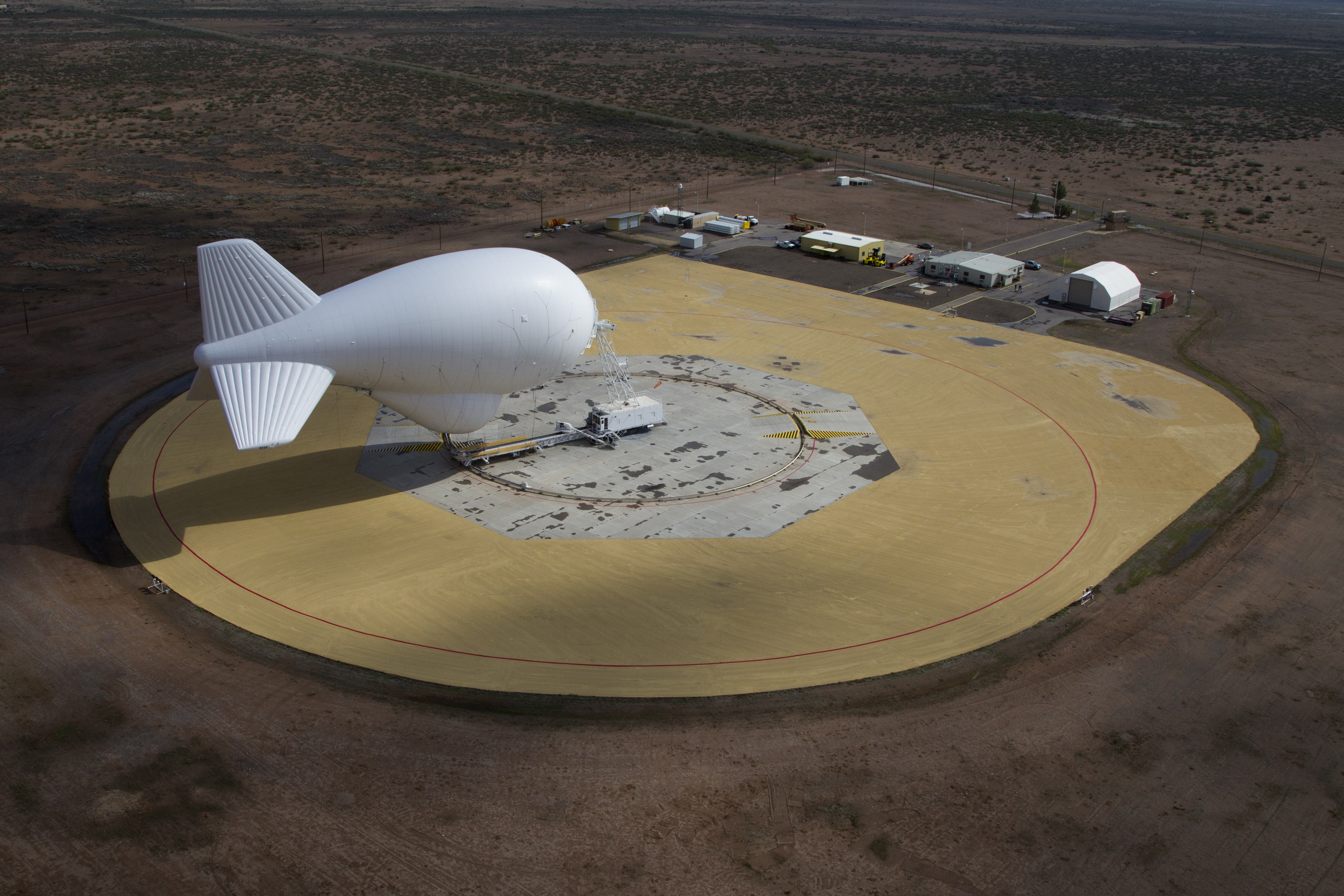
Tethered Aerostat Radar System in New Mexico

Operators launch the aerostat from a large circular launch pad containing a mooring fixed or mobile system. The mooring systems contain a large winch with 25,000 feet (7,600 m) of tether cable. Operational availability is generally limited only by the weather (60 percent standard) and routine maintenance downtime. The aerostats are stable in winds below 65 knots (120 km/h). Aerostat and equipment availability averages more than 98 percent system-wide.

For security and safety reasons, air space around aerostat sites is restricted for a radius of at least two to three statute miles and an altitude up to 15,000 feet (4,600 m).

== Mission ==
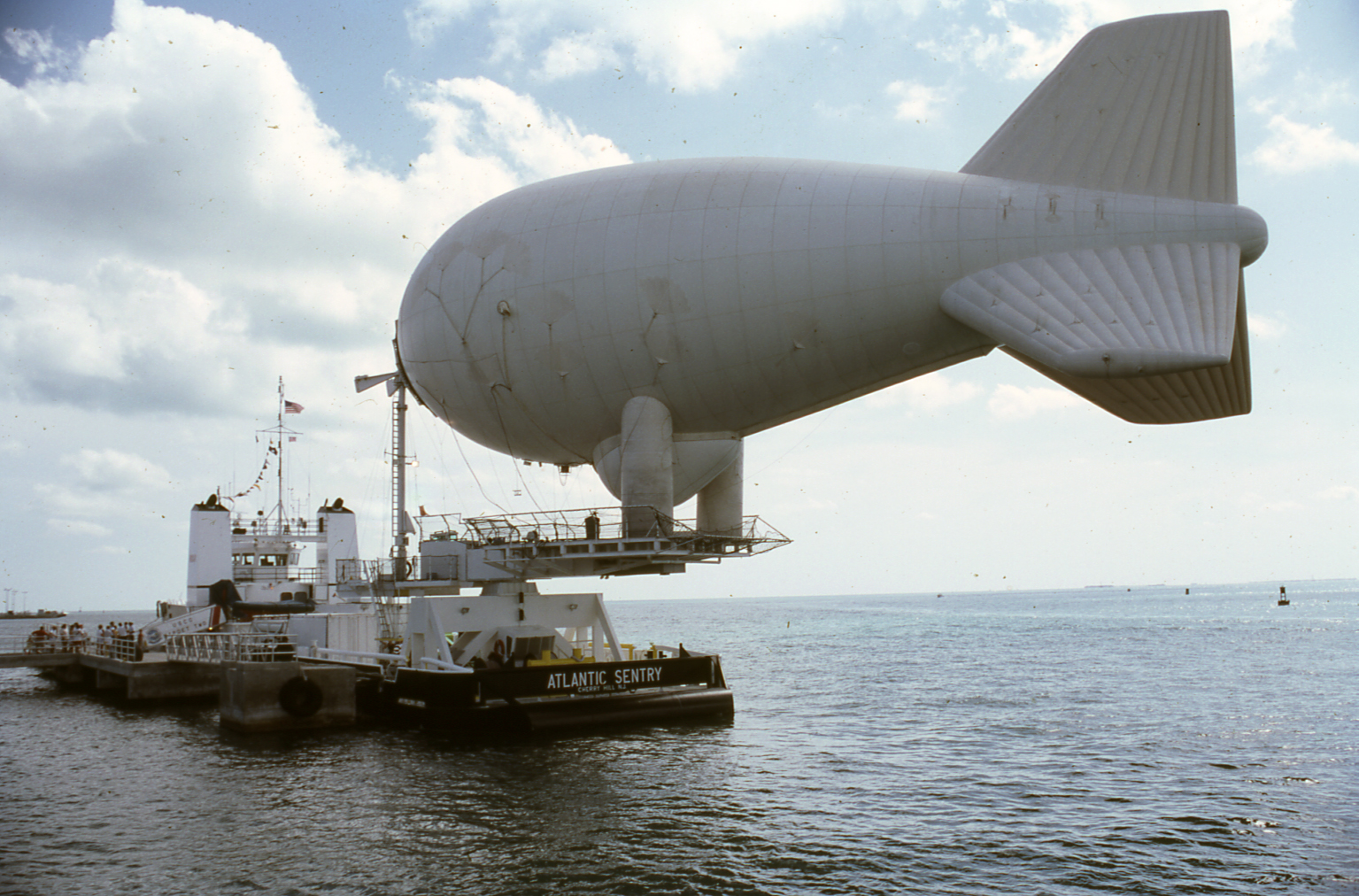
The Aerostat ship Atlantic Sentry at Mallory dock in Key West in September 1987

The primary mission is to provide low-level radar surveillance along the border between the United States and Mexico, the Straits of Florida and the Caribbean in support of federal agencies involved in the United States' drug interdiction program. The secondary mission is to provide North American Aerospace Defense Command with low-level surveillance coverage for air sovereignty in the Florida Straits. The aerostat radar data is available to NORAD and U.S. Customs and Border Protection.

Since October 2017, the aerostat has been fully utilized by Philippine Navy operators to monitor People's Liberation Army Navy and China Coast Guard movements in the South China Sea and Benham Rise. Daily operations of the aerostat have augmented the Philippine Navy's existing intelligence, surveillance, and reconnaissance capability though the use of an automatic identification system, Digital Global Positioning System (DGPS), radar, and communications equipment. Its initial concept is a mobile Littoral Monitoring Station (LMS), used to effectively monitor maritime and air traffic in areas that cannot be covered by the existing littoral monitoring station in Zambales, thereby achieving maritime situational awareness. One unique capability of the aerostat is providing persistent long-range coastal surveillance for up to 128 nautical miles (237 kilometers) at 4,000 feet (1,200 meters) elevation based on actual flight done by the aerostat students. It has the capability to be launched continuously for a week by ensuring the sufficiency of the helium content. As an LMS, the information gathered from the aerostat is sent to the Maritime Research and Information Center (MRIC), Naval Operations Center (NOC), Naval Forces Northern Luzon (NFNL), Naval Forces Operation Center (NFOC) and other Philippine Navy units and stakeholders. Other possible operational use of the aerostat include a platform for communications, a monitoring system for humanitarian and disaster response, and other surveillance purposes.

== Technical and operational data ==
- Primary function: Low-level, downward-looking radar; aircraft detection
- Volume: 275,000 and 420,000 cubic feet (12,000 m^{3})
- Tether length: 25,000 feet (7,600 m)
- Payload weight: 1,200–2,200 pounds (540–1,000 kg)
- Maximum detection range: 200 nautical miles (400 km)

=== Operational Sites ===
Sites located at Morgan City, Louisiana, and South Padre Island, Texas, Matagorda, Texas, are in a cold-storage configuration. Contract management office and logistics hub are located in Newport News, Virginia and El Paso, Texas respectively.

Location	Coordinates
Cudjoe Key, Florida (Operational)	24.696119°N 81.504511°W 24.700948°N 81.506097°W
Deming, New Mexico (Operational)	32.026574°N 107.864159°W
Eagle Pass, Texas (Not Flying)	28.38536°N 100.285963°W
Fort Huachuca, Arizona (Not Flying)	31.485808°N 110.295546°W
Lajas, Puerto Rico (Not Flying)	17.978111°N 67.079676°W
Marfa, Texas (Operational)	30.434399°N 104.320641°W
Matagorda, Texas (Not Flying)	28.710482°N 95.957682°W
Morgan City, Louisiana (Not Flying)	29.810666°N 91.662996°W
Rio Grande City, Texas (Recently Resumed Operation)	26.572331°N 98.817129°W
Yuma, Arizona (Operational)	33.015886°N 114.24331°W
San Antonio, Zambales (Not Flying)	14.9628831°N 120.0675095°E

Map
Red = Not flying
Blue = Operational

== See also ==
- Measurement and Signature Intelligence
- JLENS, Joint Land Attack Cruise Missile Defense Elevated Netted Sensor System
- Sky Dew, Israeli system
