= JLENS =

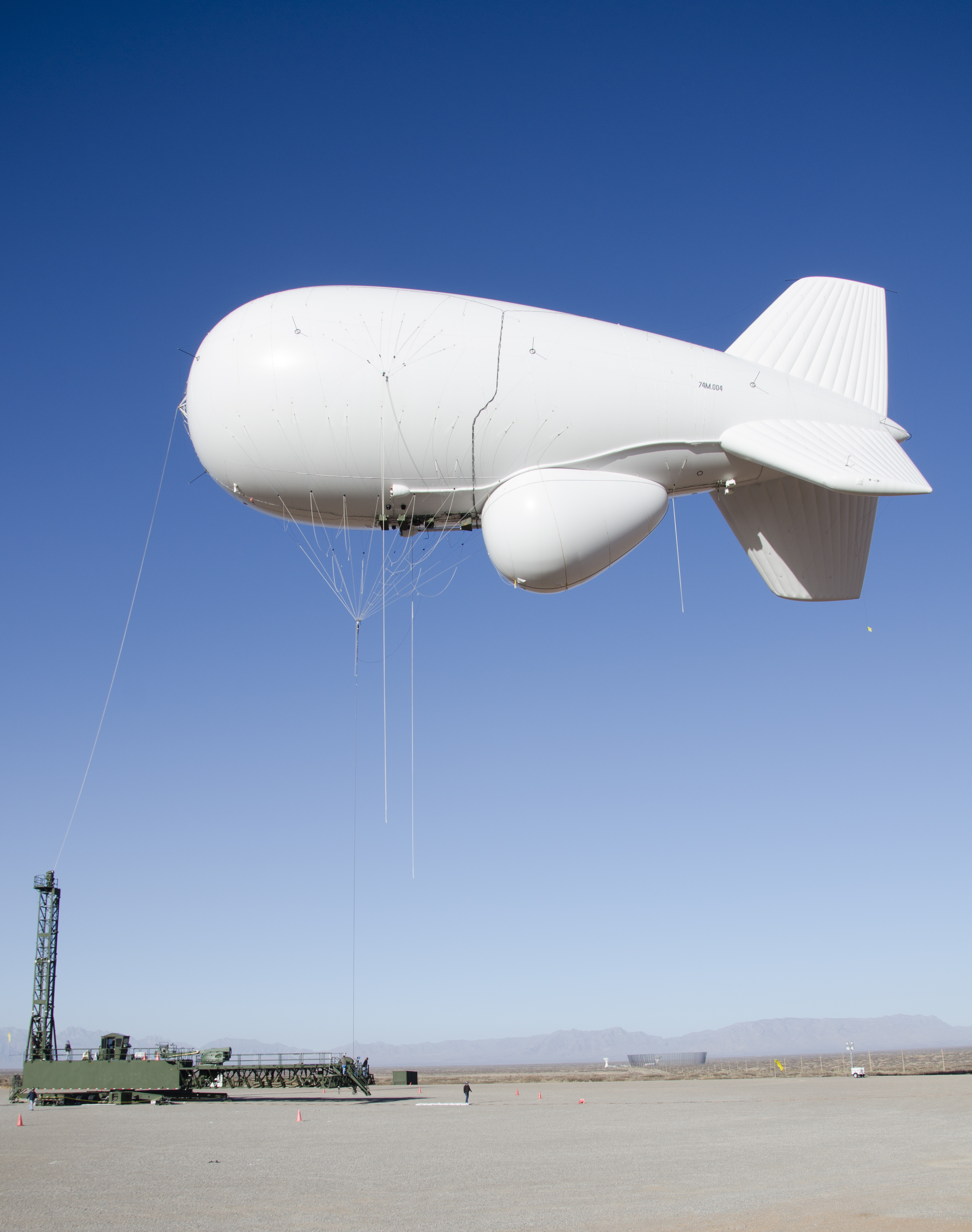
- Type: Long-range surface-to-air missile and other threat detection capability Aerostat
- Place of origin: United States

Service history
- In service: December 2014-Active testing and operation summarily suspended October 2015.
- Used by: United States Army

Production history
- Designer: Raytheon, TCOM
- Designed: 1998
- Manufacturer: Raytheon
- Unit cost: $175 million (avg unit cost)
- Produced: 2009 (Block 1) and 2011 (Block 2)
- No. built: 4
- Variants: 1

Specifications
- Mass: 7,000 pounds (3,200 kg)
- Length: 243 feet (74 m)
- Diameter: ~80 feet (24 m)
- Main armament: none
- Secondary armament: none
- Payload capacity: 3,500 pounds (1,600 kg)
- Transmission: Multiple fiber optic links to ground facility
- Propellant: none
- Fuel capacity: none
- Flight ceiling: 10,000 feet (3,000 m)
- Launch platform: tethered cable

The Joint Land Attack Cruise Missile Defense Elevated Netted Sensor System, or JLENS (colloquially, Spy Balloon), was a tethered aerial detection system designed to track boats, ground vehicles, cruise missiles, manned and unmanned aircraft (airborne early warning and control), and other threats. The system had four primary components: two tethered aerostats which utilized a helium/air mix, armored mooring stations, sophisticated radars, and a processing station designed to communicate with anti-missile and other ground and airborne systems. Each system was referred to as an "orbit", and two orbits were built. The Army-led joint program which fielded JLENS was designed to complement fixed-wing surveillance aircraft, saving money on crew, fuel, maintenance and other costs, and give military commanders advance warning to make decisions and provide notifications. Following cost overruns, underperformance, declining support in Congress, and public scrutiny following a snapped tether which allowed one craft moored at Aberdeen Proving Ground, Maryland to drift on a 100-mile uncontrolled descent across Pennsylvania, dragging its cable tether which damaged power lines and cut power to 20,000 homes, the program was suspended in October 2015, and completely discontinued by 2017.

== Background ==
In January 1996, the office of the Secretary of Defense directed the Army to establish an Aerostat Joint Project Office based in Huntsville, Alabama. The office involved all military departments—the Army would serve as program manager, while the Navy and Air Force would provide deputy program managers. Following approval of the JLENS acquisition strategy, the project office conducted design concept and risk-reduction studies.

In June 1997, the project office issued a request for proposal for an early JLENS prototype. The initial program had three objectives: (1) to mitigate risks during development and acquisition; (2) to design, develop, procure, fabricate, integrate, test, demonstrate and maintain a system which met military requirements; and (3) to provide an operational prototype which could potentially be used during a deployment of troops.

Three bids were received, and in January 1998 a joint venture between Hughes Aircraft and Raytheon, located in El Segundo, California, won the initial contract—valued at $11.9 million—as part of an estimated $292 million contract if all options were exercised.

Since that time, numerous studies and requirements changes have been made. According to JLENS' product manager, the system was poised for operational testing, a planned three-year deployment at Aberdeen Proving Ground; if successful, full deployment would be the next step.

== Design, operation and costs ==
The system features two tethered aerostats, roughly 243 feet (74 m) in length, that float to an altitude of 10,000 feet (3,000 m) for up to 30 days at a time. Each aerostat utilizes a different radar system; one has a VHF Band surveillance radar and the other an X-band fire-control radar. JLENS is designed to provide 24/7, 360-degree coverage extending 340 miles (300 nmi; 550 km). The surveillance radar scans in all directions to pick up targets, then the targeting radar looks only in a certain segment to guide weapons to it. Its detection capability seeks to equal 4–5 fixed-wing aircraft, and is designed to operate at 15–20 percent of the cost of fixed-wing aircraft.

The tethered cables relay data and provide power. As threats are detected, information is sent to anti-missile and other fire-control systems including MIM-104 Patriot, RIM-174 Standard Missile 6, AIM-120 AMRAAM, and NASAMS. Its relatively low-power usage and over-the-horizon capability makes it less expensive to operate than existing fixed-wing systems and provides significantly greater range than ground-based systems.

JLENS aerostats are filled with 590,000 cubic feet (17,000 cubic m) of non-flammable helium. Given its operational altitude, the internal pressure of JLENS is about the same as the exterior pressure, which makes the system difficult to shoot down. Airships can absorb multiple punctures before they lose altitude. When they do, they would come down so slowly that they could be reeled in, easily repaired, and quickly redeployed. Mooring stations for large systems would be relatively permanent; however, for short- or medium-range surveillance, the aerostats would likely be smaller and their mooring systems mobile.

In addition to protecting U.S. cities, the system could be deployed anywhere commanders cite a need for increased missile defense capability, such as on the Korean Peninsula.

In 2012, the JLENS program experienced a Nunn-McCurdy cost breach due to budget cuts for unit procurements. Under Secretary of Defense Frank Kendall reviewed the program and directed the Army to continue with a reduced test plan using the two existing JLENS developmental orbits and prepare for operational testing at Aberdeen. Two years later, in March 2014, a report by the Government Accountability Office concluded that $2.78 billion had been invested in system design, development and other costs.

Following incidents with the JLENS aerostats, some retired military officials suggested that the system's sophisticated sensors be moved to more reliable platforms like satellites or long-endurance UAVs to fulfill the role of detecting low-flying cruise missiles.

== Testing ==
Since the program's inception, extensive testing has been conducted on the JLENS system. In September 2005 the program successfully completed a two-day functional review, which examined fire-control radar, surveillance radar, processing station, communication system and platform. In 2012, tests were conducted December 6–7 at White Sands Missile Range in New Mexico. The system tracked four threats similar to tactical ballistic missiles, and it met its primary and secondary goals, including launch point estimation, ballistic tracking and discrimination performance.

A 2012 report by the Pentagon's operational testing office found JLENS deficient in four “critical performance areas” and rated its overall reliability as “poor.” A year later, Pentagon technical specialists, in their most recent assessment of the system, said JLENS “did not demonstrate the ability to survive in its intended operational environment.”

In January 2013, Raytheon conducted a field trial of the JLENS equipped with its multi-spectral targeting system-B (MTS-B) to observe simulated terrorists planting an improvised explosive device (IED) in real-time. The electro-optical/infrared (EO/IR) sensor successfully tracked ground targets, even under smoky conditions from a recent forest fire. Imagery captured by the MTS-B was passed through the JLENS tether for operators to view a live feed from dozens of miles away, simultaneously tracking ground targets using its integrated radar system, demonstrating the potential for integration of JLENS radar and EO/IR payloads.

In 2013, the Army, utilizing its own soldiers, put the system through a series of demanding drills during a period referred to as early user testing. Previously, contractor employees had been the system's primary operators. Following the six-week successful trials held at Dugway Proving Ground in Utah, the Army took formal control of the system.

In October 2014, lab tests demonstrated that data collected by the JLENS radar system could be converted into a format for use by NORAD's command and control systems.

== Deployment ==
A three-year exercise for one of the two JLENS orbits was slated to begin in early 2015 at Aberdeen Proving Ground north of Baltimore, Maryland, contingent upon federal funding. The president's 2015 budget request included $54 million for JLENS. The U.S. House of Representatives cut funding in half, while the Senate fully funded JLENS. One analyst noted that "failure to pass a defense spending bill by March 2015 would impact JLENS at Aberdeen."

The deployment joined an ongoing exercise known as Operation Noble Eagle, with JLENS casting an aerial net from Boston to Lake Erie to Raleigh, North Carolina, with a particular eye toward detecting threats approaching the nation's capital. The system was able to detect ground-based vehicles up to 140 miles (230 km) away, from Richmond, Virginia to Cumberland, Maryland to Staten Island, New York. The program's second orbit was kept in strategic reserve for potential future deployment.

The JLENS program was funded through achieving Initial Operational Capability (IOC) and low-rate production, which were expected around 2017 as scheduled, however only the two test model systems were put into operational service.

== Privacy, weaponization, and weather concerns ==
Privacy advocates raised concerns that the deployment could be used to track individuals by generating radar geo-location data and correlating it with other technology, including cellphone metadata and traffic cameras. A spokesperson for the Army stated that "absolutely, 100 percent" that JLENS will not have video cameras, nor will it collect personally identifiable information. “The primary mission...is to track airborne objects,” the Army said. “Its secondary mission is to track surface moving objects such as vehicles or boats. The capability to track surface objects does not extend to individual people." Experts cite the extreme angles from overhead as precluding even advanced surveillance systems from being able to identify faces or other features such as license plates, though anonymized geolocation data has been found to easily identify specific individuals.

Privacy groups raised concerns that advanced sensors such as ARGUS, MTS-B and other Wide Area Persistent Surveillance EO/IR payloads may be deployed, as Federal privacy regulations currently do not apply and the Army has refused to conduct a privacy impact assessment. One privacy group has also claimed that JLENS could be weaponized and that it is capable of carrying Hellfire missiles. However, the manufacturer claims that JLENS does not have any weapons and that it has the capacity to detect, not carry, Hellfire missiles.

The JLENS system is designed to stay aloft and survive most weather patterns. According to the system's manufacturer, JLENS has survived 106 mph (47 m/s) winds.

== Incidents ==
In the fall of 2010, a JLENS prototype was destroyed when another airship crashed into it after becoming unmoored during severe weather.

On October 28, 2015, one of two JLENS aerostats being used to conduct a test over Aberdeen Proving Ground in Aberdeen, Maryland, became untethered. It was escorted by two fighter jets as it drifted at an altitude of approximately 16,000 feet (4,900 m) towards Pennsylvania. About three hours later, it was reported by NORAD to be approaching the ground near Bloomsburg, Pennsylvania, about 100 miles (160 km) north of Aberdeen. Its dragging 6,700 foot (2,000 m) tether reportedly downed many power lines in the area, with loss of electrical power to as many as 20,000 area residents. The Pennsylvania State Police reported less than an hour later that the aerostat was "contained". It was found tangled in trees in Anthony Township, Pennsylvania. The Pentagon suspended trials of the system after the incident until the Army completed its investigation of how the aerostat broke free. The program was said to be "hanging by a thread" after the incident. By February 2016, the investigation had found that a malfunctioning pressure sensing device caused a loss of air pressure in the tail fins, leading to the loss of aerodynamic efficiency which, along with increased wind drag, exacerbated tension on the tether to the point of breakage. Following the incident, the military initially decided that the JLENS should continue with its operational exercise because of the unique cruise-missile defense capability it provides, determining that changes and procedures will enable it to safely fly again.

== Cancellation ==
The fiscal 2017 budget for the program was cut from the requested $45 million to $2.5 million. According to Defense News, the "nearly unanimous lack of funding for the program spells death for JLENS". The blimps were kept in storage and the small budget was being used to close out the program, according to Defense News.

== See also ==
- U.S. Army Aviation and Missile Command
- Anti-ballistic missile
- National Missile Defense
- Surveillance blimp
- Tethered Aerostat Radar System
- U.S. Army Air Defense Units
- Hybrid Air Vehicles HAV 304 Airlander 10
- Sky Dew
