= Airborne ground surveillance =

Radar system class for detecting ground targets

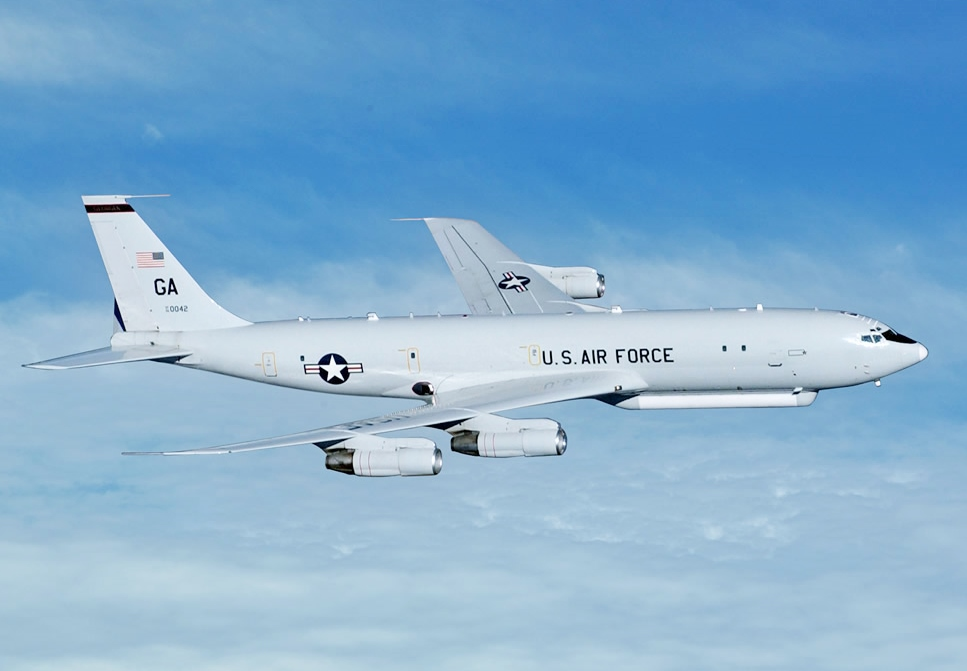
A U.S. Air Force E-8C Joint STARS, in flight.

Airborne ground surveillance (AGS) refers to a class of military airborne radar system (surveillance aircraft) used for detecting and tracking ground targets, such as vehicles and slow moving helicopters, as opposed to Airborne early warning and control, whose primary role is detecting and tracking aircraft in flight. Antenna beam width should be very small to enhance resolution. This antenna size limitation demands high frequency (GHz range) of operation, to be operated in this mode. AGS radar is typically a medium or low power radar. It includes both maritime and land surveillance. Today, UAVs perform this operation, which often uses optical aids for surveillance.

== Aircraft ==
- US Air Force Northrop Grumman E-8 Joint STARS
- US Navy Boeing P-8 Poseidon
- Russian Air Force Tupolev Tu-204R
- British Royal Air Force Raytheon Sentinel
- US Air Force Northrop Grumman RQ-4 Global Hawk
- Tethered Aerostat Radar System
- JLENS

== See also ==
- Intelligence, surveillance, target acquisition, and reconnaissance
- Alliance Ground Surveillance – a NATO programme to acquire an AGS capability.
- Unmanned aerial vehicle
- Synthetic aperture radar
