= Yuma Proving Ground =

US military facility

- Part of US Army Test and Evaluation Command
- La Paz County and Yuma County, Arizona; Near Yuma, Arizona
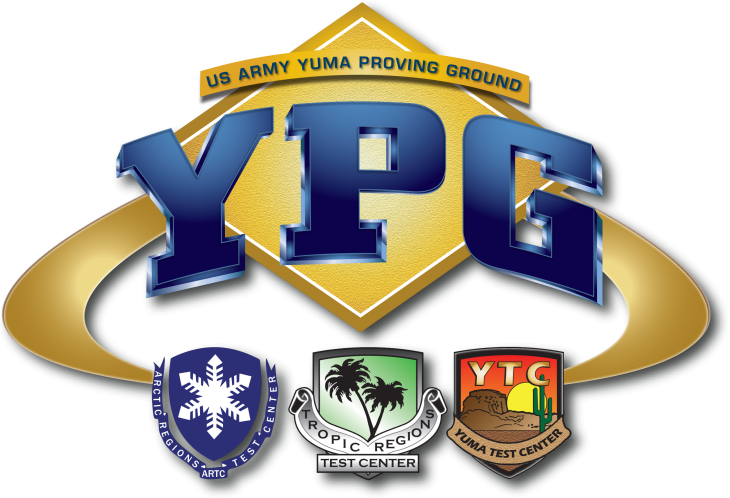
- Yuma Proving Ground logo

Site information
- Type: Military proving ground
- Owner: United States Army
- Controlled by: United States Army Test and Evaluation Command
- Website: https://home.army.mil/yuma/

Location
- Coordinates: 33.0178°N 114.253°W

Site history
- Built: 1943
- In use: 1950 – present

Garrison information
- Current commander: COL Charles Seaberry
- Occupants: U.S. Army Garrison, YPG; Medical Department Activity, YPG; Yuma Test Center; Tropic Regions Test Center—conducted in various locations but managed out of YPG; Arctic Regions Test Center—located at Fort Greely, AK but subordinate to YPG; Airborne Test Force; Military Free-Fall School—conducted by the John F. Kennedy Special Warfare Center and School; Special Operations Terminal Attack Controllers Course—conducted by the 24th Special Operations Wing; Test Measurement and Diagnostic Equipment Support Laboratory; Tethered Aerostat Radar System—operated by U.S. Customs and Border Protection

Yuma Proving Ground (YPG) is a United States Army series of environmentally specific test centers with its Yuma Test Center (YTC) being one of the largest military installations in the world. It is subordinate to the U.S. Army Test and Evaluation Command.

YPG's headquarters is located at its YTC in southwestern La Paz County and western Yuma County in southwest Arizona, United States, approximately 30 miles (48 km) north of the city of Yuma. Facilities are located at the Colonel George W. Howard Cantonment Area (support facilities), the General Walton H. Walker Cantonment Area (headquarters facilities), and the Kofa Cantonment Area (range facilities).

Of the four extreme natural environments recognized as critical in the testing of military equipment, three fall under the management authority of YPG. Realistic natural environment testing ensures that American military equipment performs as advertised, wherever deployed around the world. YPG manages military equipment and munitions testing at three locations: The Arctic Regions Test Center at Fort Greely, Alaska; the Tropic Regions Test Center operating in Panama, Honduras, Suriname, and Hawaii; and at YTC. The common link between these test centers is "environmental testing," which makes the proving ground the Army's environmental test expert.

Official YPG overview video (4:52)

Official YPG history video (9:31)

== History ==
The presence of the U.S. Army in Yuma goes back to 1850, when Fort Yuma was constructed on a hill overlooking the important Yuma crossing of the Colorado River. Soldiers at Fort Yuma maintained peace and protected the important Yuma Crossing, which was used by thousands of travelers each year.

The Army constructed a second facility in 1865, the Yuma Quartermaster Depot, to act as a supply base for Army posts throughout Arizona and parts of New Mexico. Supplies were delivered by riverboats and transported from the depot to military outposts by wagon. After Fort Yuma and the Yuma Quartermaster Depot closed in the 1880s, the Army did not return to Yuma on a permanent basis until World War II.

Yuma Proving Ground traces its history to Camp Laguna and the Army Corps of Engineers Yuma Test Branch, both activated in 1943. Located on the Colorado River, the Yuma Test Branch conducted testing on combat bridges, amphibious vehicles, and boats. Tens of thousands of mechanized and infantry soldiers were trained at Camp Laguna for duty at combat fronts throughout the world, from North Africa to the South Pacific. Abandoned campsites and tank trails can still be found on the proving ground.

Camp Laguna lasted only until the end of World War II. The Yuma Test Branch was closed in 1949 and reactivated two years later as the Yuma Test Station, under the operational control of the Sixth U.S. Army. In 1962, the station was named Yuma Proving Ground and reassigned to the U.S. Army Materiel Command as an important component of the Test and Evaluation Command. On 26 July 1973, it officially received its full name – U.S. Army Yuma Proving Ground. The following year it was designated as a Department of Defense Major Range and Test Facility Base.

Since its early days, Yuma Proving Ground has been a desert environmental test center for all types of military equipment and materiel. However, developmental and a variety of other types of testing of artillery systems and ammunition, aircraft armament and targeting systems, mobility equipment, and air delivery systems, not necessarily desert environmental-related, now comprise the bulk of the workload. A heavy investment in technology and a highly skilled soldier-civilian workforce makes the proving ground a significant social and economic component of the local community.

== Yuma Test Center ==
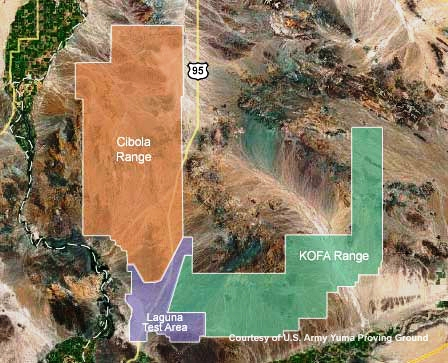
YTC's primary ranges: Cibola Range, Kofa Range, and the Laguna Test Area where YPG headquarters in located

YTC encompasses 1,307.8 square miles (3,387.2 km²) of the northwestern Sonoran Desert and conducts tests on nearly every weapon in the ground combat arsenal. Nearly all the long-range artillery testing for U.S. ground forces takes place at the YTC in an area almost completely removed from urban encroachment and noise concerns. Restricted airspace controlled by the test center amounts to over 2,000 square miles (5,000 km^{2}). YTC has the longest overland artillery range (40 miles or 64 kilometres) in the nation, the most highly instrumented helicopter armament test range in the Department of Defense, over 200 miles (300 km) of improved road courses for testing tracked and wheeled military vehicles, over 600 miles (1,000 km) of fiber-optic cable linking test locations, and the most modern mine and demolitions test facility in the western hemisphere. Realistic villages and road networks representing urban areas in Southwest Asia have been constructed and are used for testing counter-measures to the threat of roadside bombs. It is estimated that the track can be used to test about 80 percent of the Army's wheeled vehicle fleet.

More than 3,000 people, mostly civilians, work at YTC, which is the largest employer in Yuma County.

In a typical year, over 500,000 artillery, mortar and missile rounds are fired, 36,000 parachute drops take place, 200,000 miles (320,000 km) are driven on military vehicles, and over 4,000 air sorties are flown from YTC's Laguna Army Airfield.

About 10 percent of the YTC's workload is training. In a typical year, dozens of units come to the facility for realistic desert training, especially before deploying overseas.

YTC's clean air, low humidity, skimpy rainfall – only about 3 inches (76 mm) per year – and annual average of 350 sunny days, add up to optimal testing and training conditions. Urban encroachment and noise concerns are nonexistent problems, unlike at other military installations.

YTC tests improvised explosive devices, commonly known as IEDs, the number-one killer of American service men and women in Iraq and Afghanistan. Hundreds of unmanned aerial vehicles fly at the proving ground each year from the six airfields located at YTC, as do helicopters and fixed-wing aircraft conducting personnel and cargo parachute drops.

Many friendly foreign nations also visit YTC to conduct test programs.

The General Motors Desert Proving Ground – Yuma opened at YTC in late July 2009. General Motors built the facility at a cost of more than $100 million after closing its desert automotive test facility in Mesa, Arizona, that had been in operation since 1953. The new facility allows General Motors and Army automotive testers to test their wheeled vehicles all year-round.

YTC offers the following for testing, evaluation, and training purposes:

- Ground weapons systems from small arms to long range artillery
- Helicopter armament and target acquisition systems
- Artillery and tank munitions
- Cargo and personnel parachutes, including guided systems technologies
- Land mines and mine-removal systems
- Tracked and wheeled vehicles in a desert environment
- Vibration and interference-free tests of smart weapon systems
- Laguna Army Airfield complex, featuring two runways – 6,000 feet (1,800 m) and 5,150 feet (1,570 m).
- 12 drop zones and multiple airstrips for Unmanned Aerial Systems
- A 55-mile (89 km) overland artillery range, the longest in the nation
- Over 200 miles (300 km) of improved road courses for tracked and wheeled vehicles
- State-of-the-art fiber optics systems to acquire, reduce and transmit data in real time
- Specialized facilities for testing countermeasures for the defeat of roadside bombs, such as the National Counterterrorism/Counterinsurgency Integrated Test and Evaluation site
Examples of the various tests and activities conducted at YTC
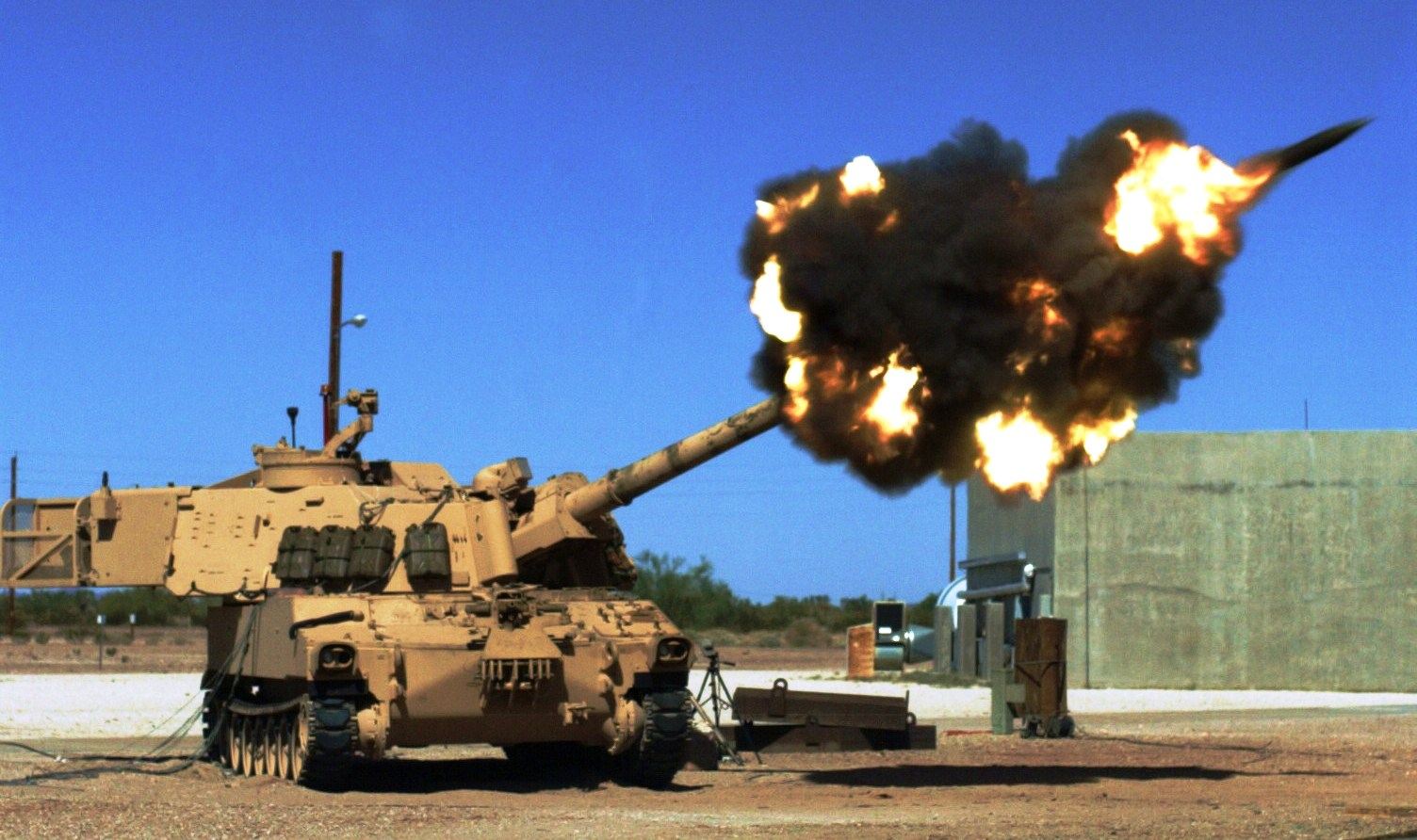
YTC's Ground Combat Systems test-fires a M109A6 self-propelled howitzer at a YTC artillery range.

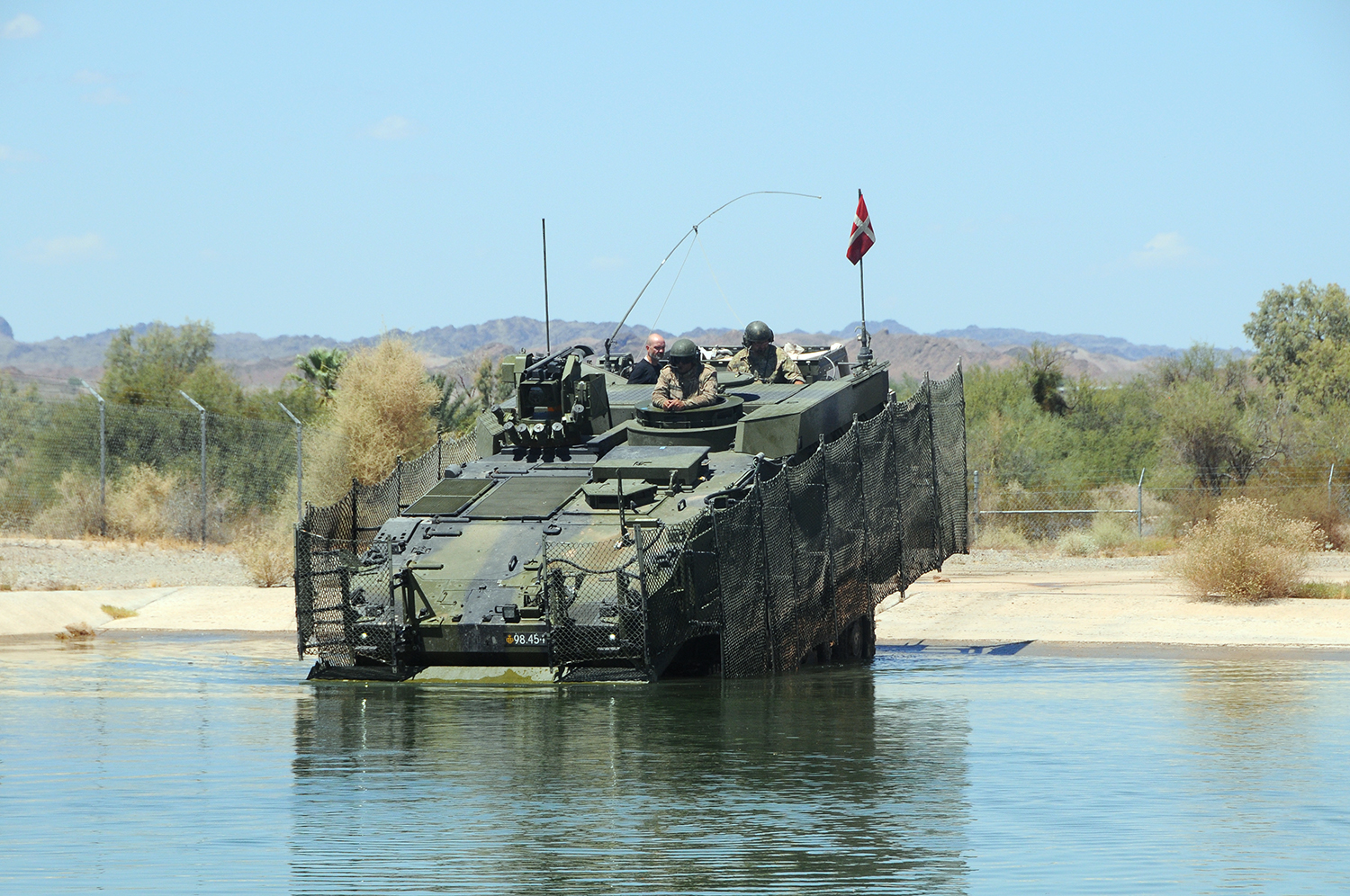
A Royal Danish Army Piranha V infantry fighting vehicle conducts testing at YTC's water fording pit.

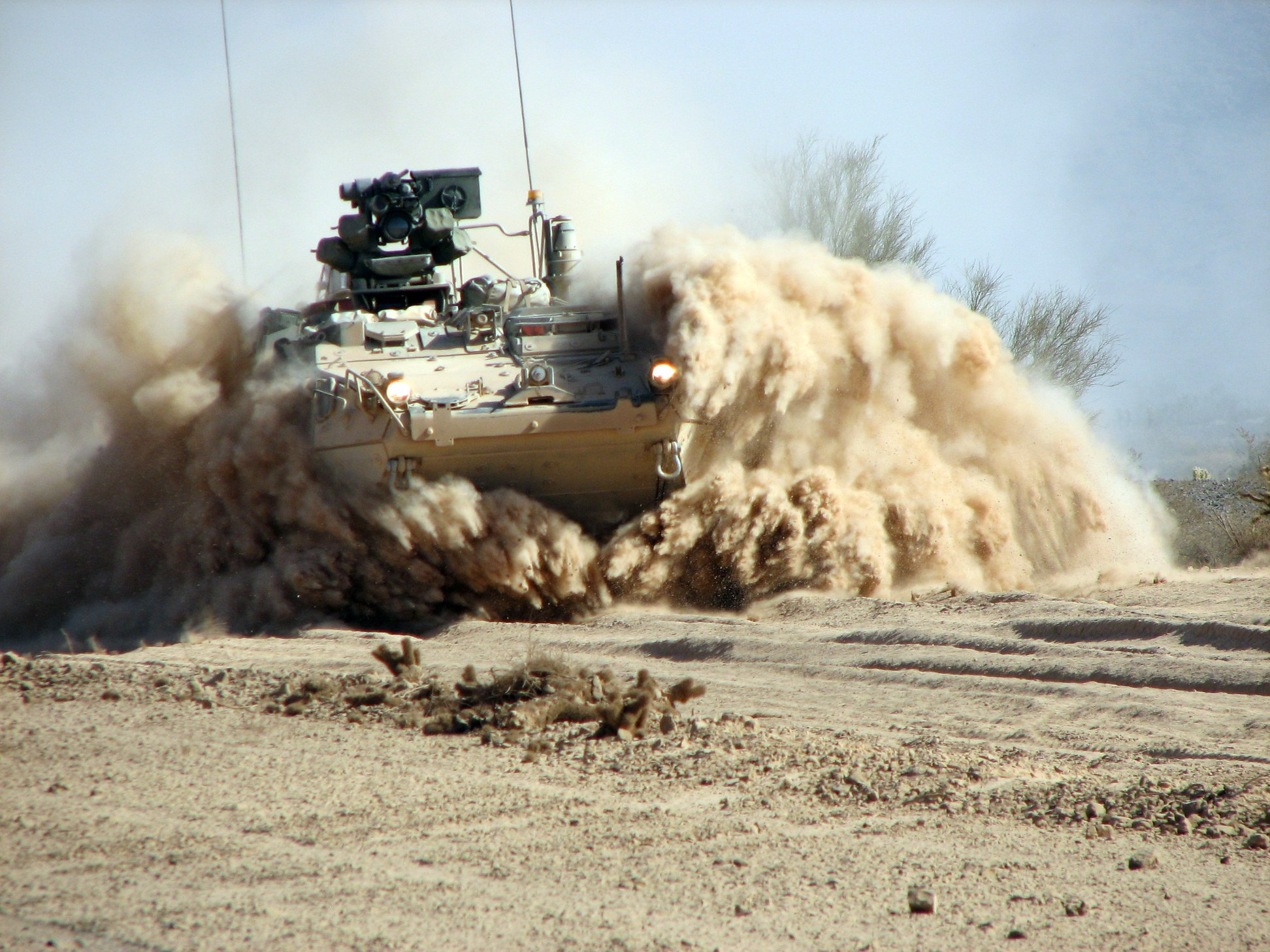
A M1126 infantry carrier vehicle conducting desert mobility testing at YTC

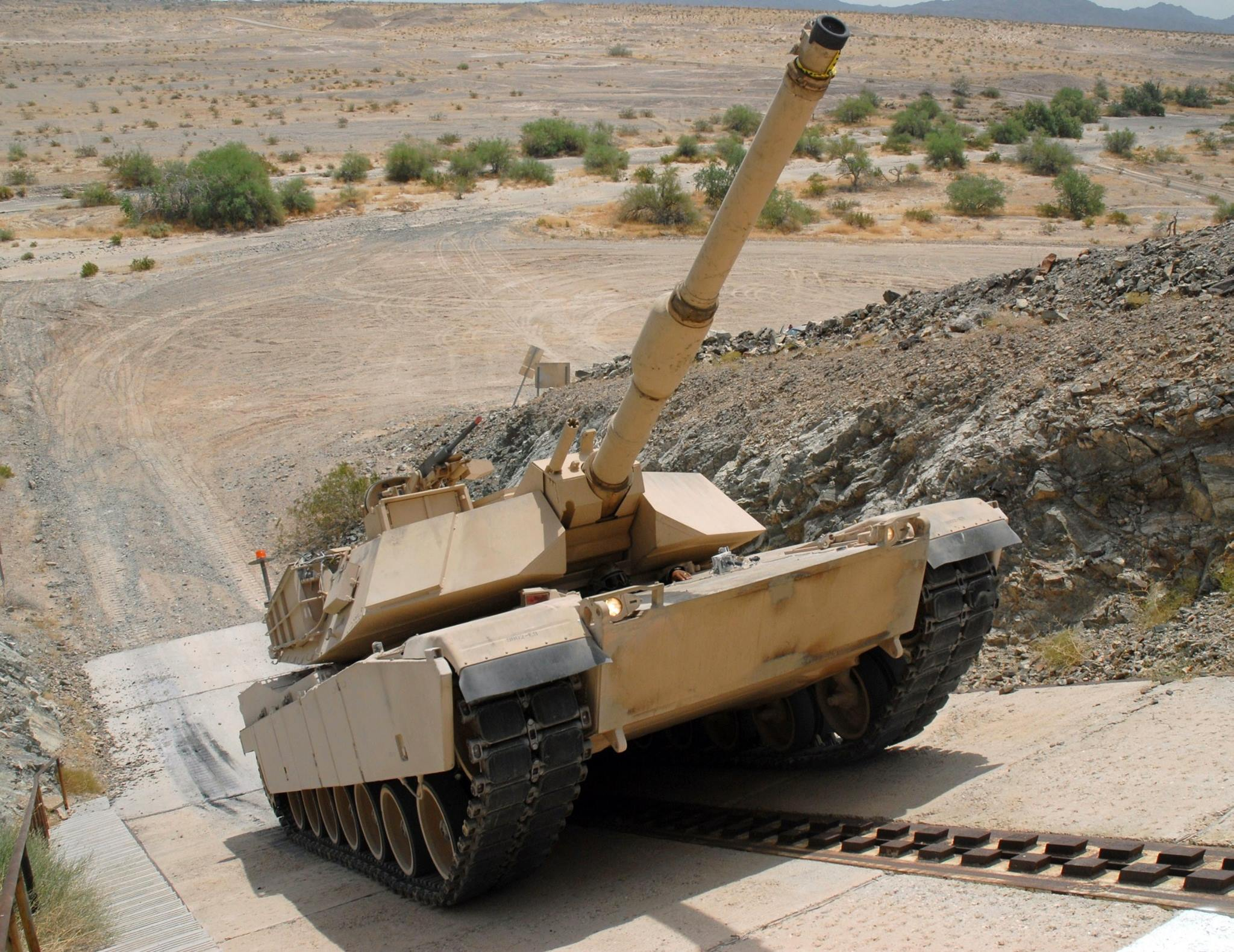
An M1 main battle tank climbs a 60° incline, part of performance testing at YTC.

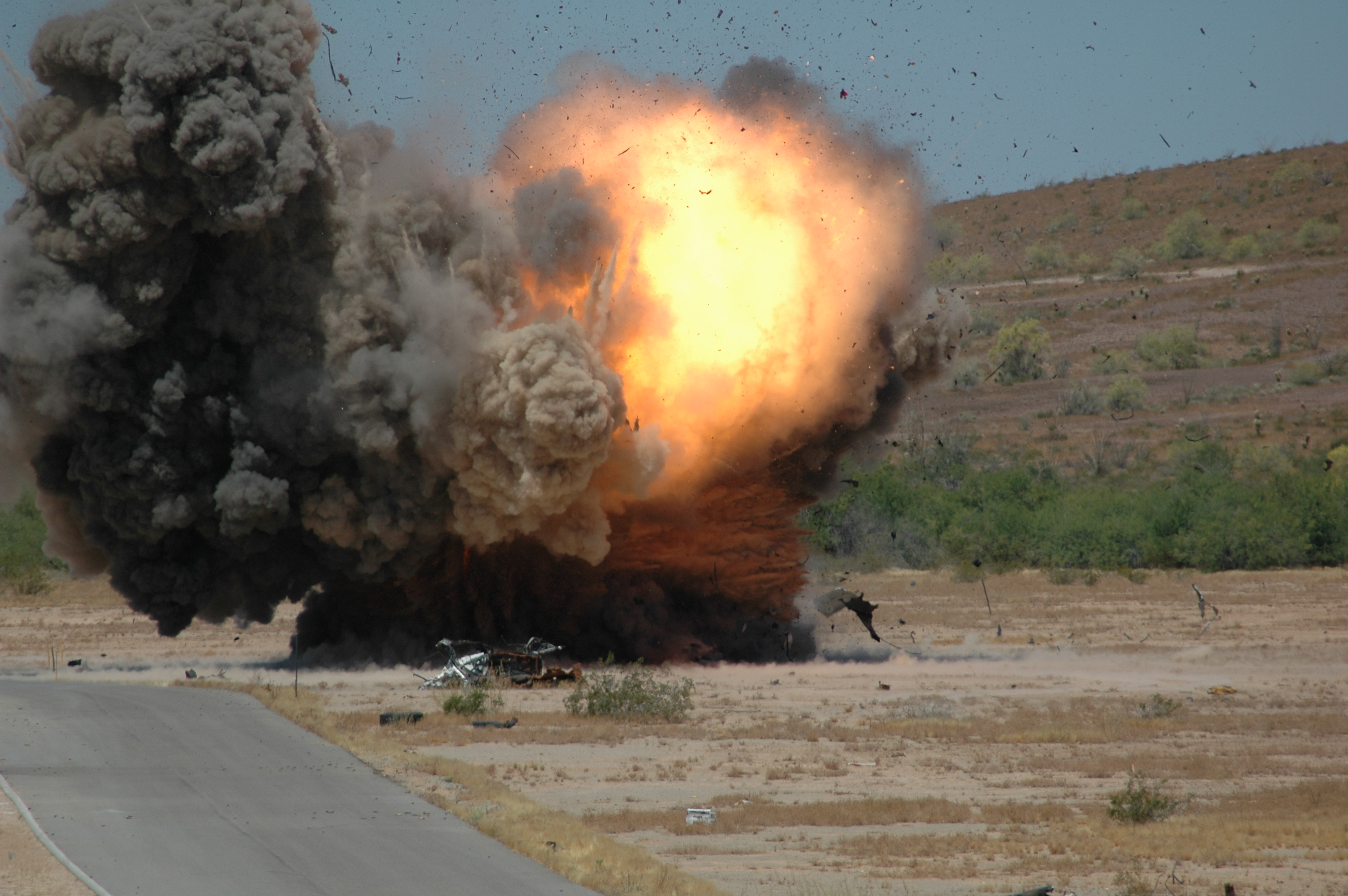
Roadside improvised explosive device countermesture testing at YTC

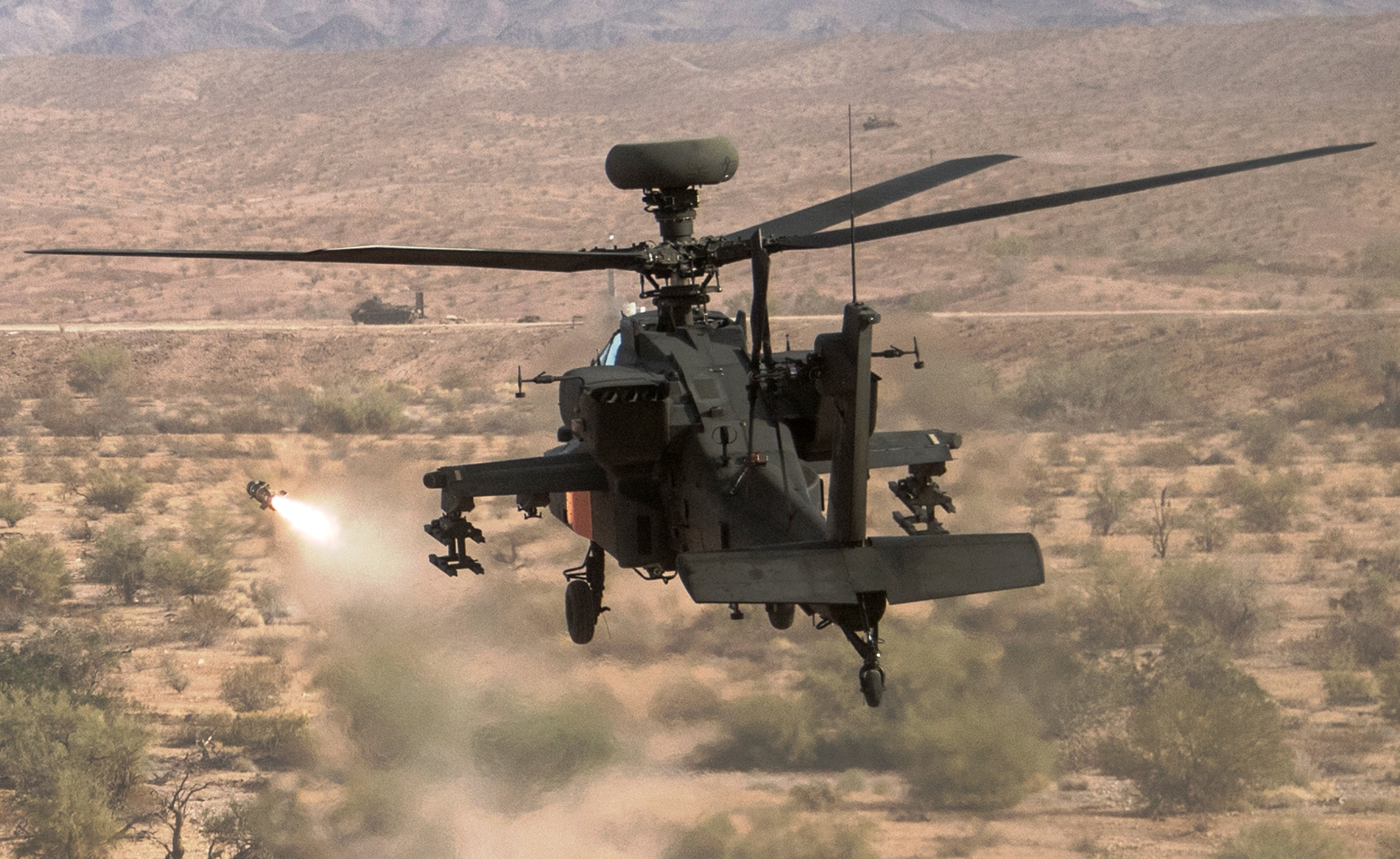
An AH-64D attack helicopter conducts AGM-179 air-to-surface missile live-fire test on Cibola Range at YTC.

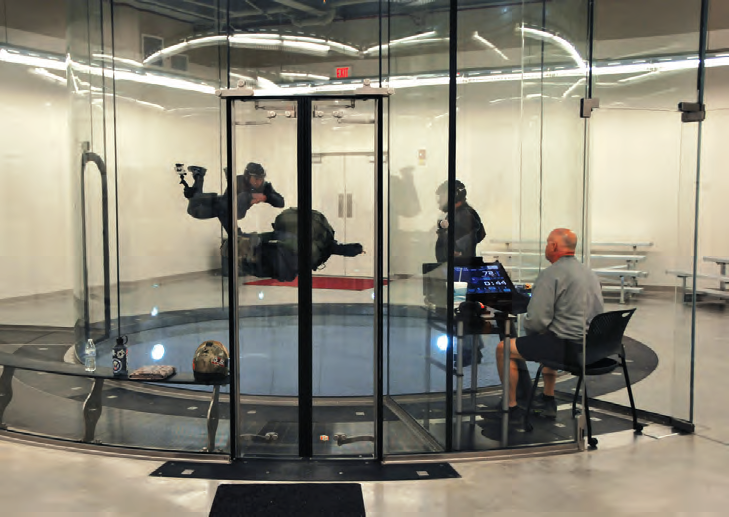
The Military Free-Fall School's MSG George A Bannar Wind Tunnel at YTC is the world's largest, supporting eight simultaneous jumpers.

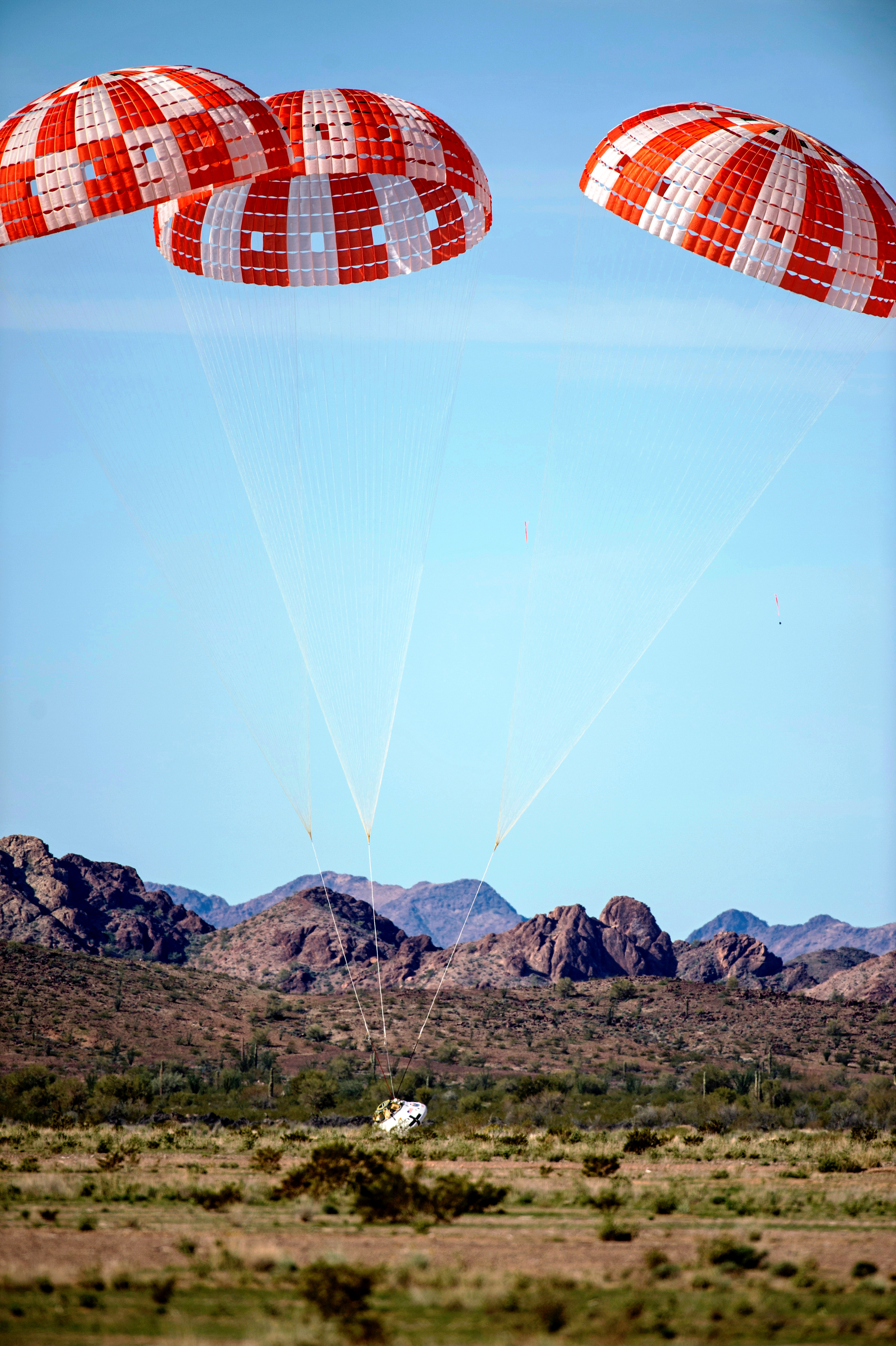
NASA's Orion Spacecraft Capsule Parachute Assembly System testing at YTC

Marines prepare to breach a building during a mock helicopter raid at YTC, part of U.S. Marine Corps Weapons and Tactics Instructor Course.

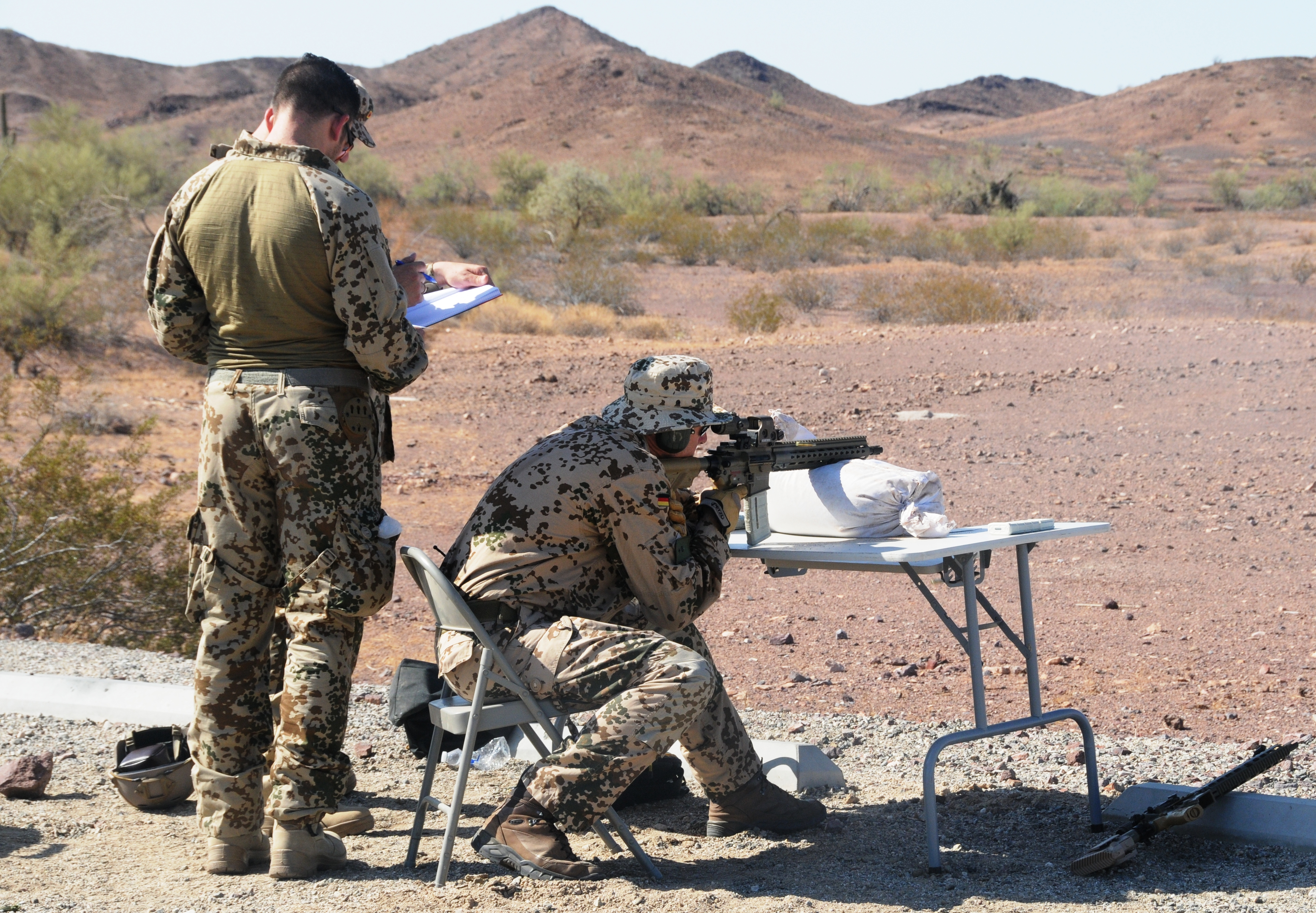
German soldiers test new assault rifles at YTC.

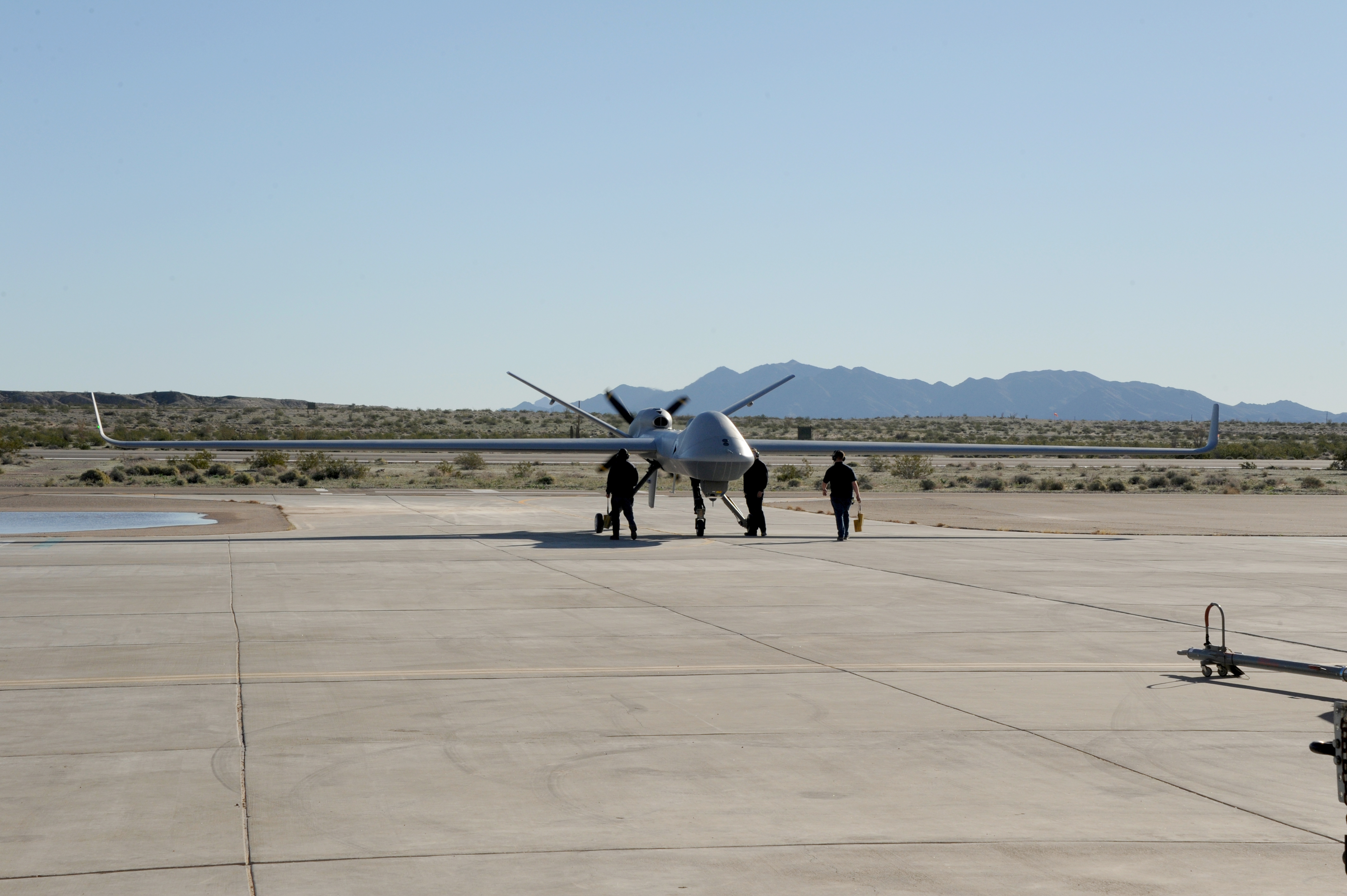
An MQ-9B unmanned aerial vehicle used the Laguna Army Airfield at YTC to achieve a 48.2 hour endurance record and first FAA certification of an unmanned aircraft to fly in civilian air space.

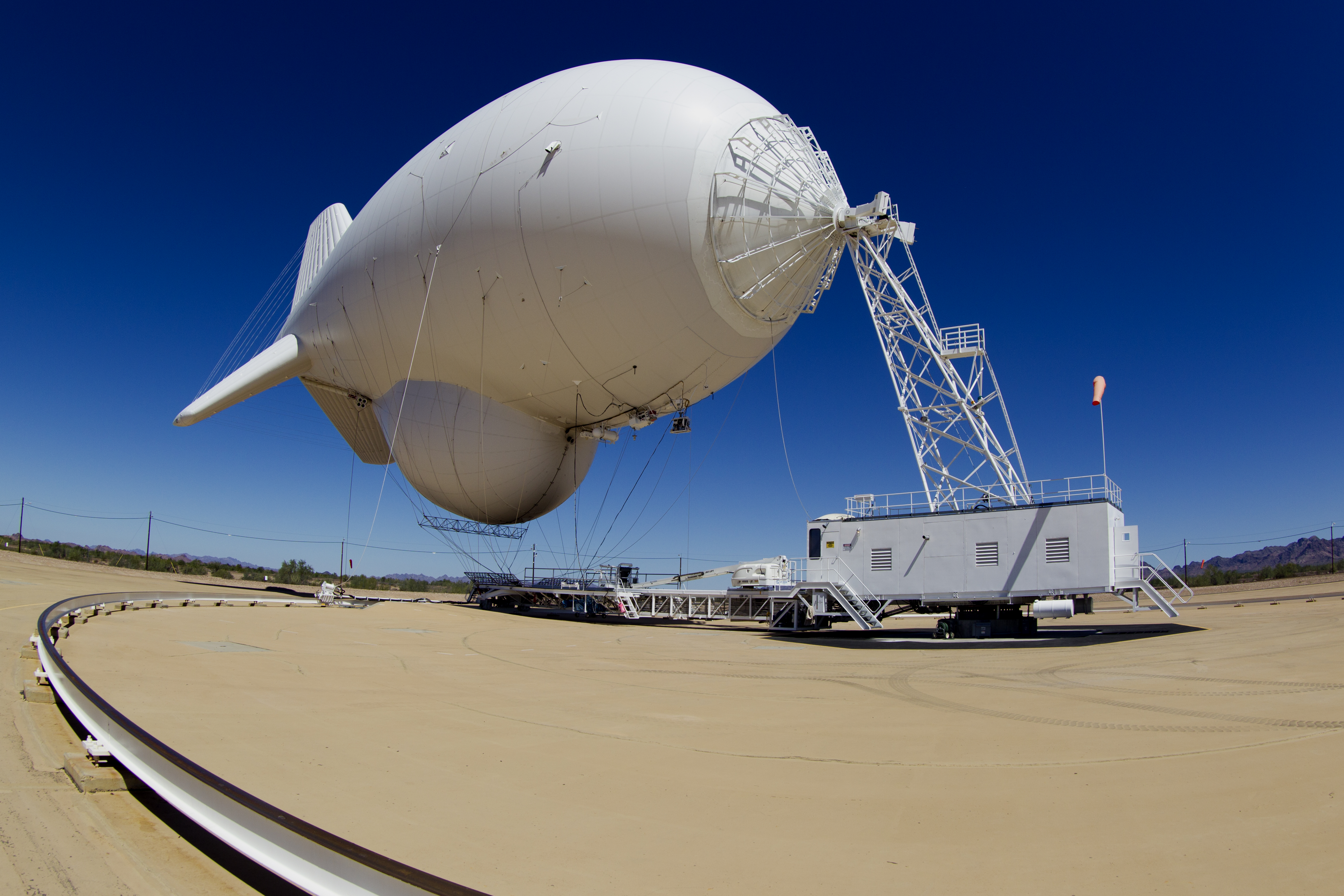
U.S. Customs and Border Protection's tethered aerostat radar system at YTC

== Tropic Regions Test Centers ==
Examples of testing at various Tropic Regions Test Centers (TRTCs)
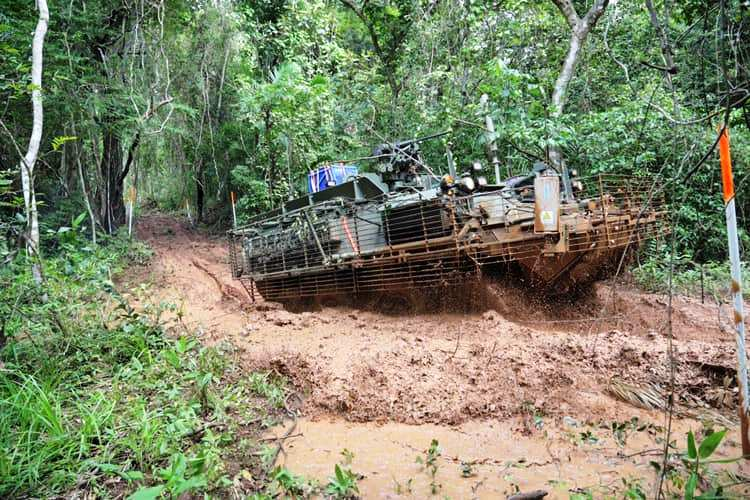
An M1126 infantry carrier vehicle undergoes tropical environment testing at a TRTC site in Hawaii.

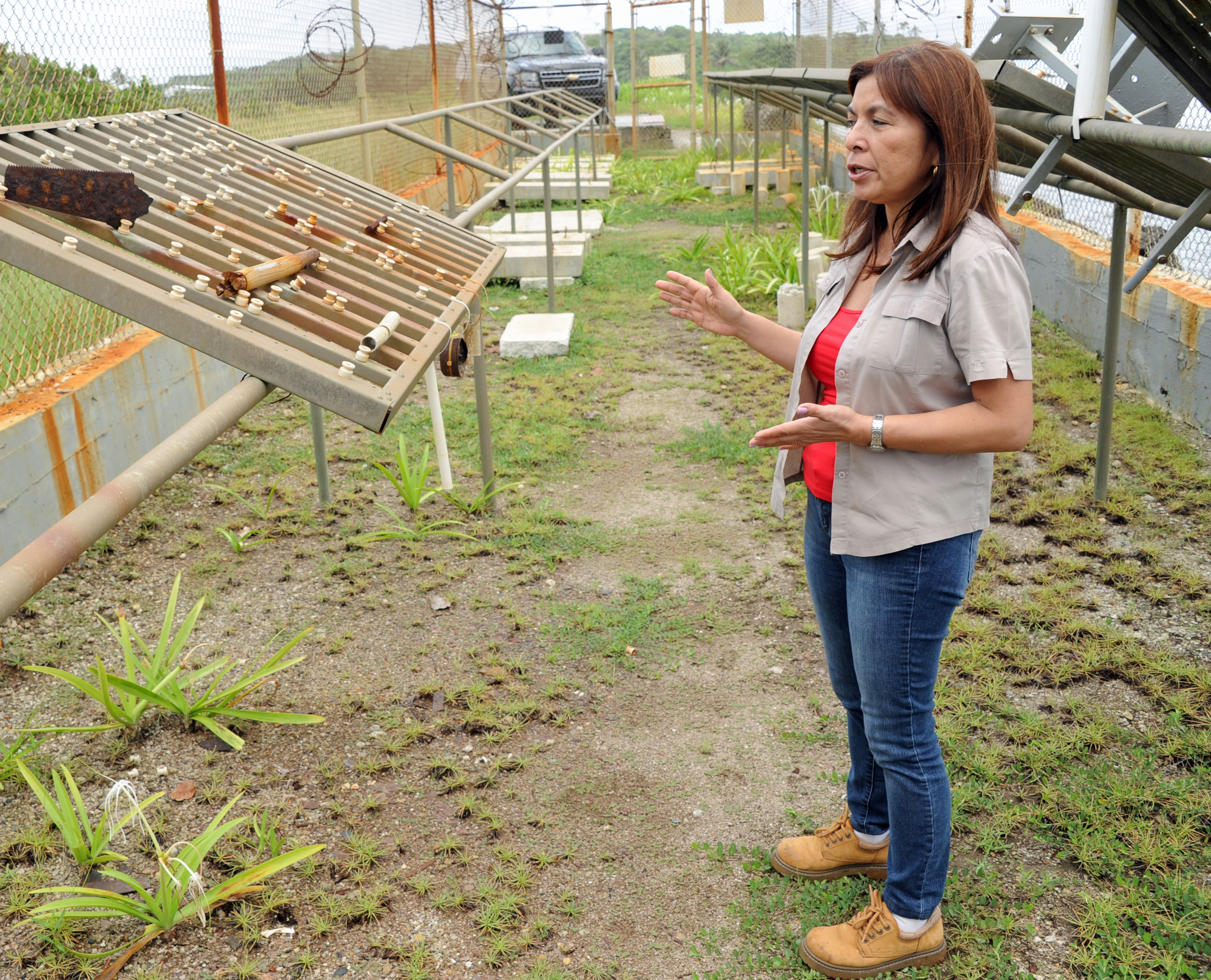
Material corrosion testing at TRTC's Breakwater Exposure Site in Central America

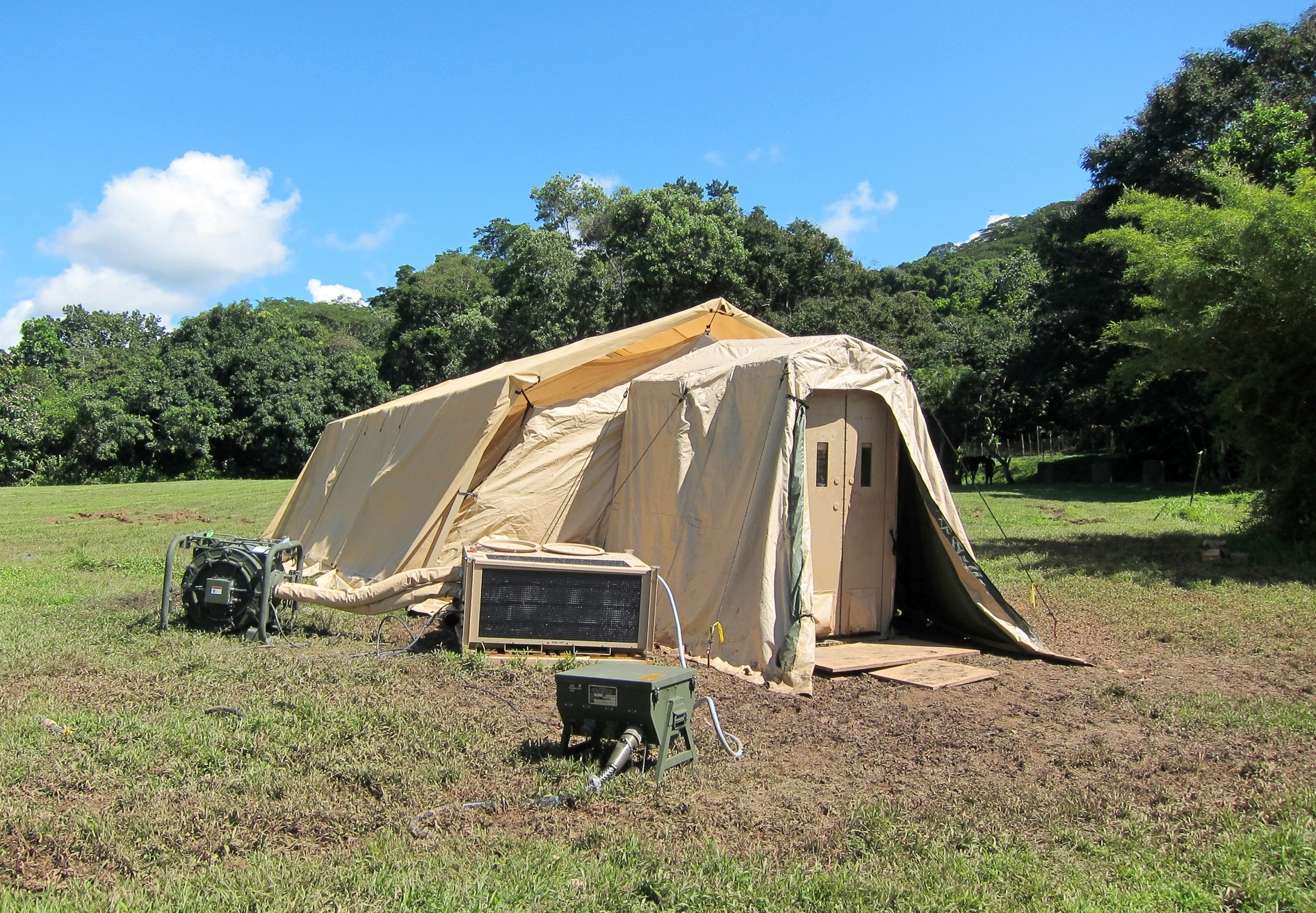
Joint Expeditionary Collective Protection tent testing at a TRTC site, after being tested at YTC

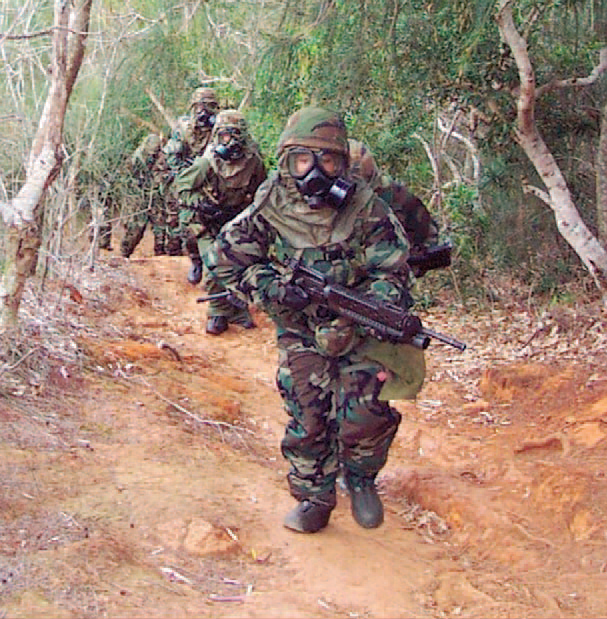
Soldiers evaluate the performance of MOPP 4 gear at a TRTC site in Hawaii.

== Arctic Regions Test Center ==
Examples of various testing at the Arctic Regions Test Center (ARTC)
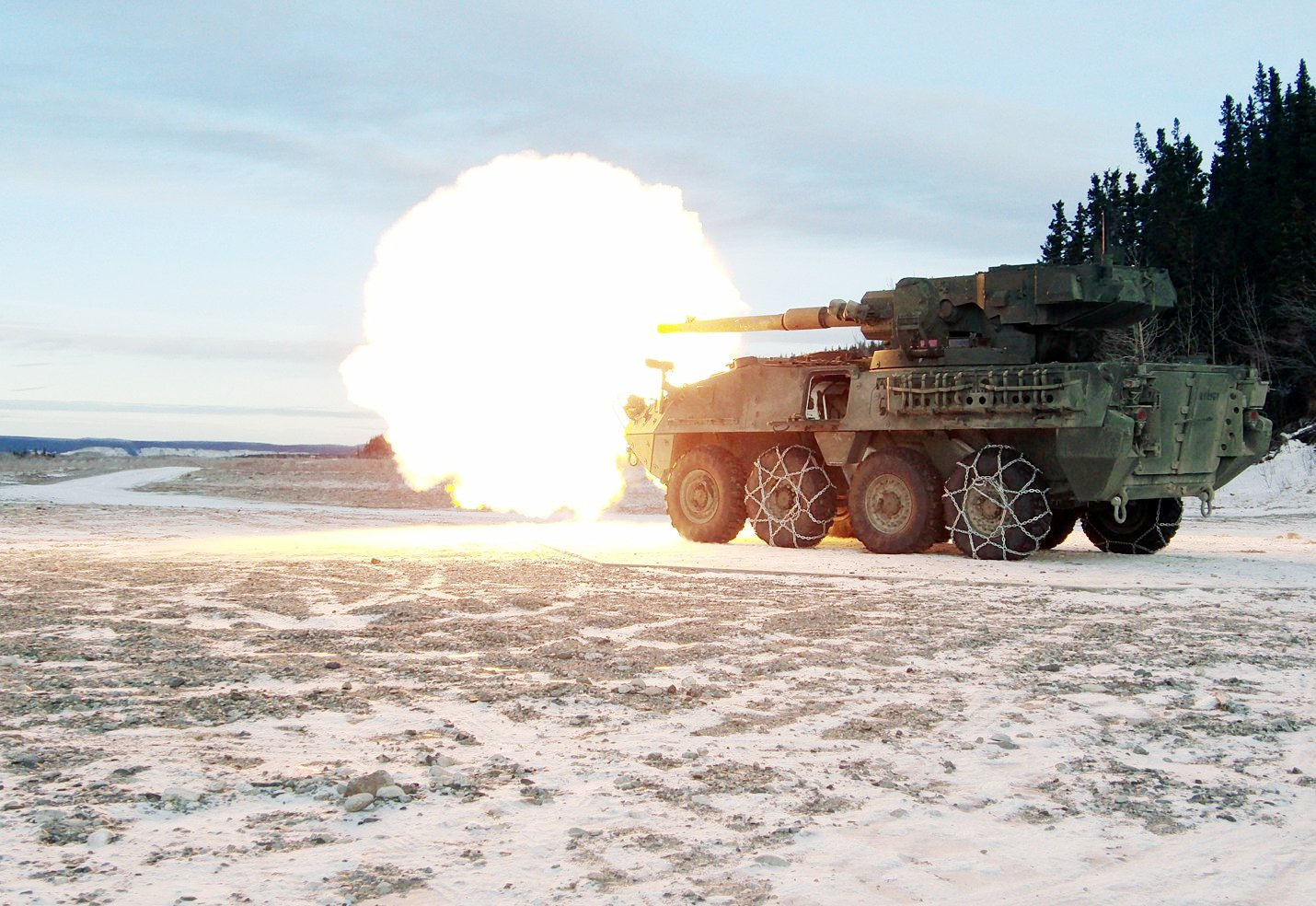
An M1128 mobile gun system undergoes cold weather live-fire testing at ARTC.

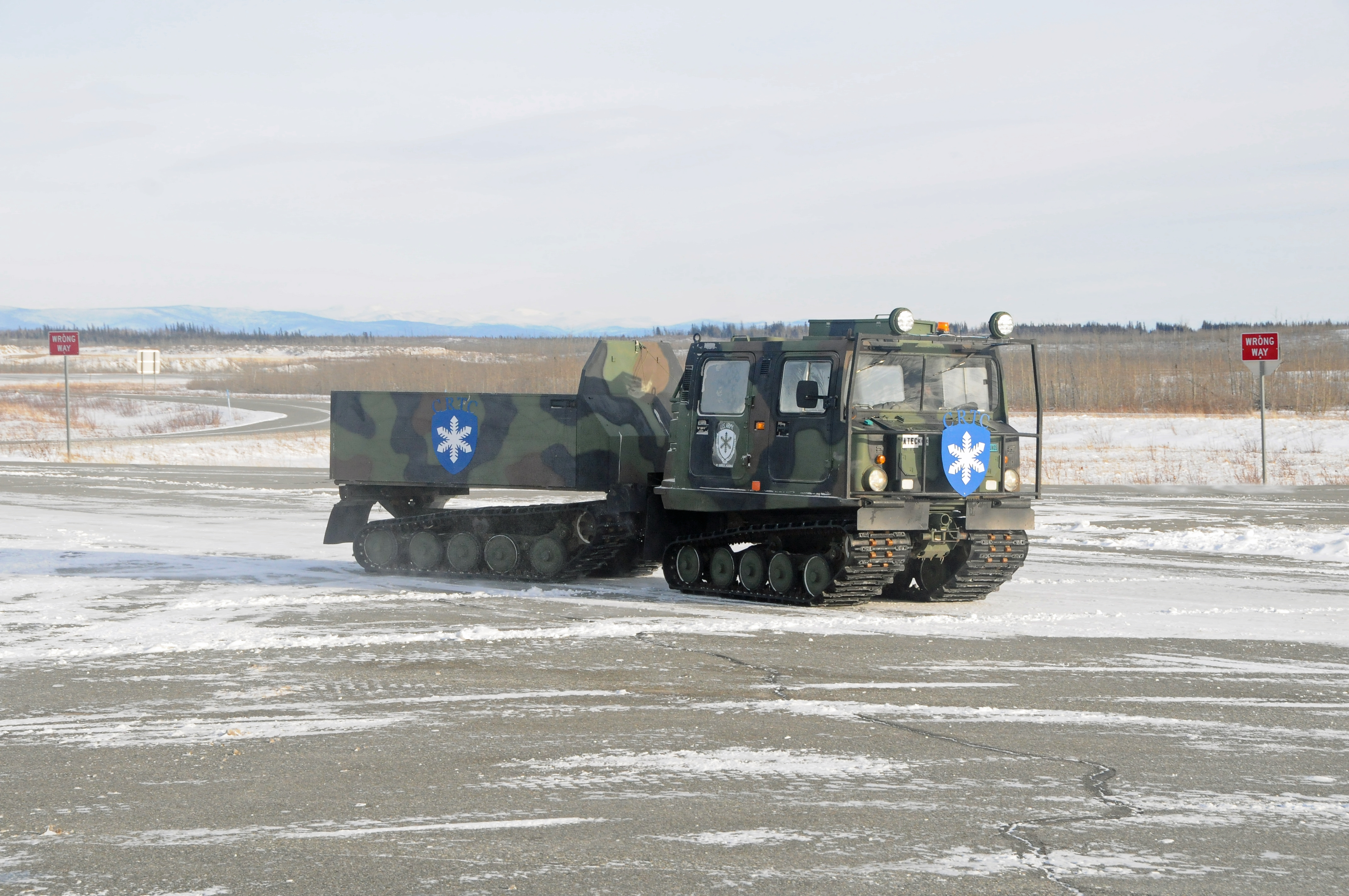
A small unit support vehicle undergoes testing on ARTC's Mobility Test Track.

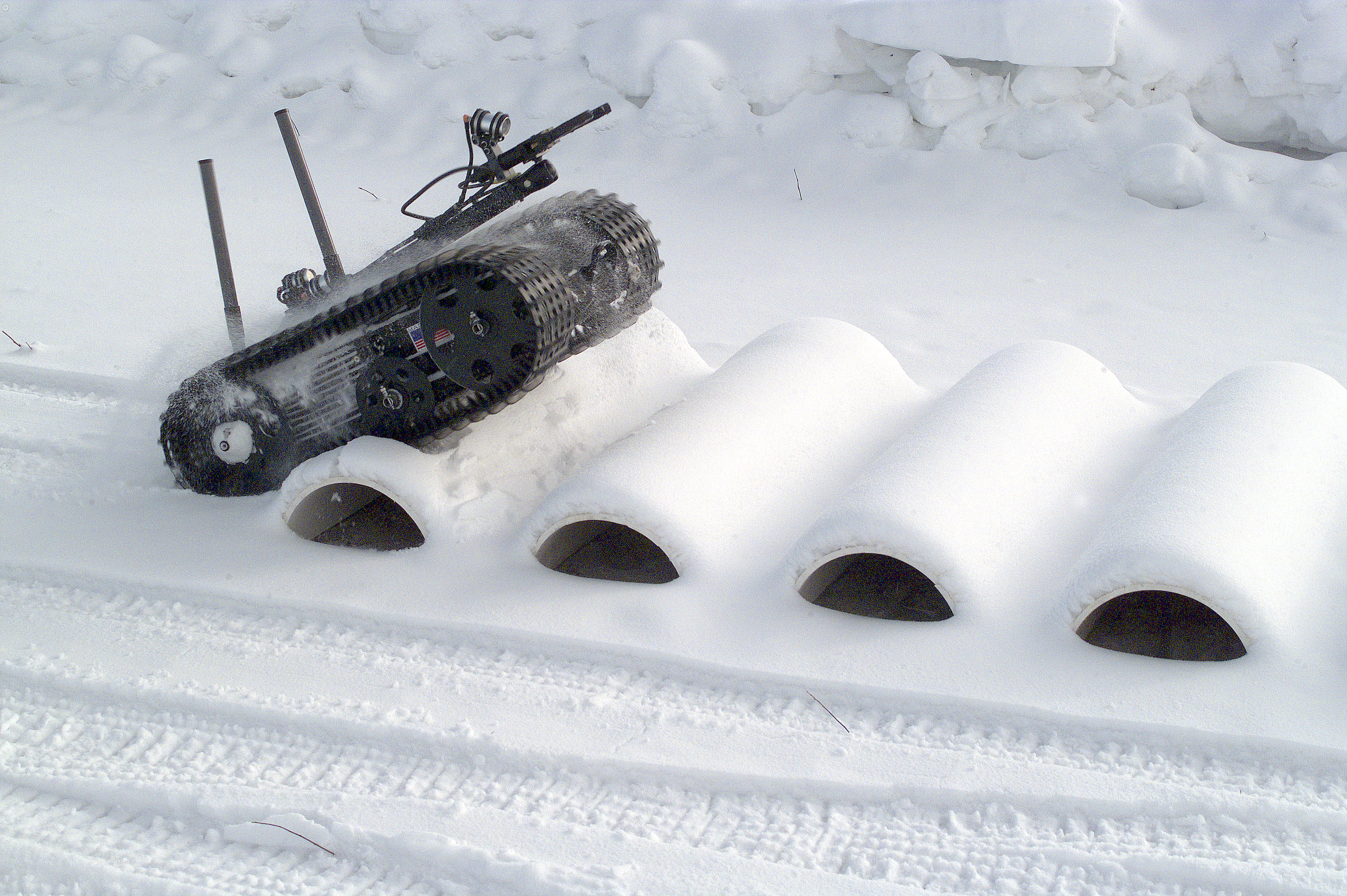
A robotic vehicle undergoes mobility testing on a bump course at ARTC.

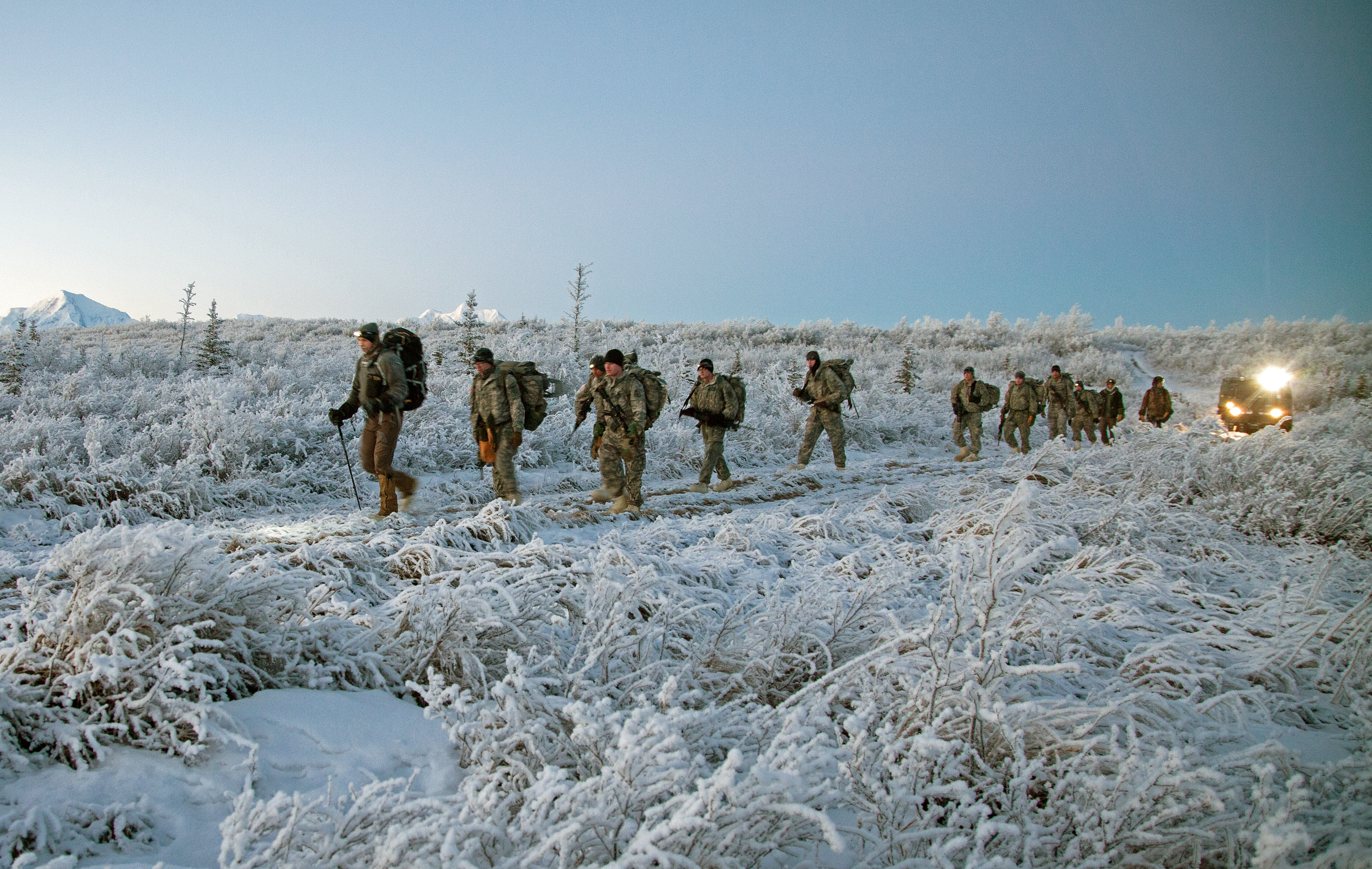
Soldiers test a new modular body armor system in the extreme cold at ARTC.

== Demographics ==
Yuma Proving Ground
- Census-designated place
- Interactive map of Yuma Proving Ground
- Coordinates: 32°51′55″N 114°26′13″W
- Country: United States
- State: Arizona
- County: Yuma

Population (2020)
  - Total: 313
- Time zone: UTC-7 (MST (no DST))

Yuma Proving Ground is a census-designated place (CDP) covering the population of the Howard Cantonment at Yuma Proving Ground in Yuma County, Arizona.

It first appeared as a CDP in the 2020 Census with a population of 313.

Historical population
Census	Pop.	Note	%±
2020	313		—
U.S. Decennial Census; 2020

=== 2020 census ===
Yuma Proving Ground CDP, Arizona – Racial and Ethnic Composition (NH = Non-Hispanic) Note: the US Census treats Hispanic/Latino as an ethnic category. This table excludes Latinos from the racial categories and assigns them to a separate category. Hispanics/Latinos may be of any race.
Race / Ethnicity	Pop 2020	% 2020
White alone (NH)	171	54.63%
Black or African American alone (NH)	20	6.39%
Native American or Alaska Native alone (NH)	6	1.92%
Asian alone (NH)	22	7.03%
Pacific Islander alone (NH)	0	0.00%
Some Other Race alone (NH)	0	0.00%
Mixed Race/Multi-Racial (NH)	34	10.86%
Hispanic or Latino (any race)	60	17.17%
Total	313	100.00%

=== Education ===
Yuma Proving Ground is served by the Yuma Elementary School District and the Yuma Union High School District. Yuma Elementary School District operates Price Elementary School on base. Ron Watson Middle School is the zoned middle school. Gila Ridge High School is the zoned high school.

== Climate ==
Climate data for Yuma Proving Ground, Arizona (1991–2020)
Month	Jan	Feb	Mar	Apr	May	Jun	Jul	Aug	Sep	Oct	Nov	Dec	Year
Mean daily maximum °F (°C)	69.2 (20.7)	72.8 (22.7)	79.7 (26.5)	86.1 (30.1)	94.1 (34.5)	103.3 (39.6)	106.8 (41.6)	106.4 (41.3)	101.7 (38.7)	90.3 (32.4)	77.4 (25.2)	67.1 (19.5)	87.9 (31.1)
Daily mean °F (°C)	56.9 (13.8)	60.3 (15.7)	66.4 (19.1)	72.3 (22.4)	80.0 (26.7)	88.6 (31.4)	94.3 (34.6)	94.4 (34.7)	88.8 (31.6)	76.7 (24.8)	64.2 (17.9)	55.1 (12.8)	74.8 (23.8)
Mean daily minimum °F (°C)	44.7 (7.1)	47.8 (8.8)	53.1 (11.7)	58.5 (14.7)	65.8 (18.8)	73.8 (23.2)	81.8 (27.7)	82.4 (28.0)	76.0 (24.4)	63.1 (17.3)	51.0 (10.6)	43.2 (6.2)	61.8 (16.5)
Average precipitation inches (mm)	0.52 (13)	0.53 (13)	0.41 (10)	0.12 (3.0)	0.03 (0.76)	0.01 (0.25)	0.19 (4.8)	0.38 (9.7)	0.43 (11)	0.20 (5.1)	0.28 (7.1)	0.45 (11)	3.55 (88.71)
Average snowfall inches (cm)	0.0 (0.0)	0.0 (0.0)	0.0 (0.0)	0.0 (0.0)	0.0 (0.0)	0.0 (0.0)	0.0 (0.0)	0.0 (0.0)	0.0 (0.0)	0.0 (0.0)	0.0 (0.0)	0.0 (0.0)	0 (0)
Source: NOAA
