= Rancho Aguaje de la Centinela =

Pre-statehood California land grant

Coordinates: 33.970°N 118.370°W

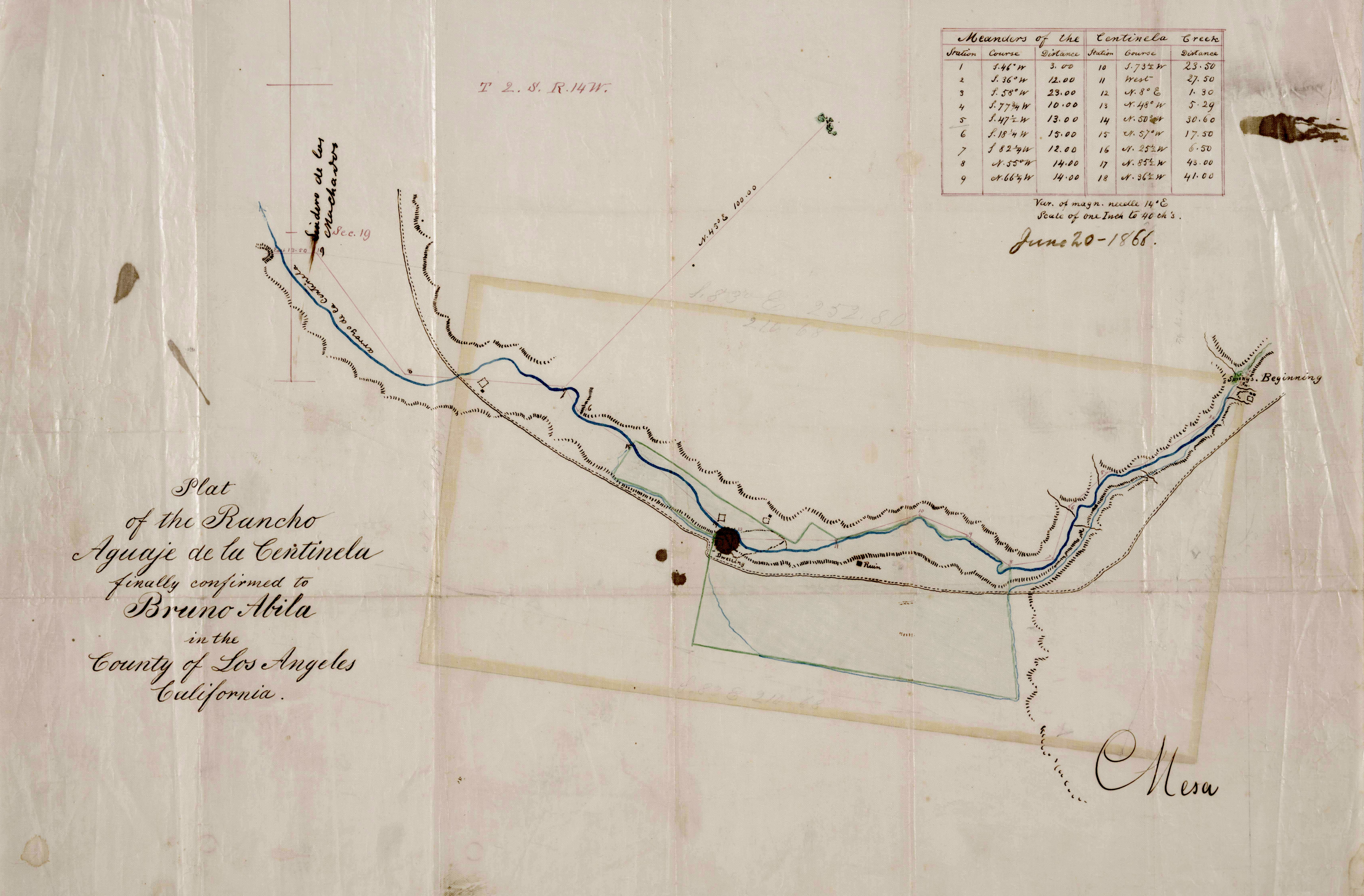
Survey of Centinela Creek in 1866 (Huntington Library SR_Map_0002.02)

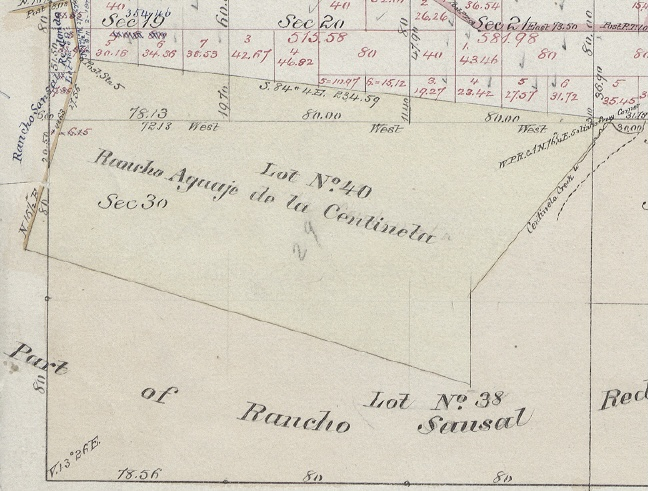
Hand-drawn plat map, 1872

Rancho Aguaje de la Centinela was a 2,219-acre (8.98 km^{2}) Mexican land grant in present-day Los Angeles County, California, given in 1837 to Ygnacio Machado. The name means "Sentinel of the Waters" in Spanish, and refers to the artesian water in the area exemplified by Centinela Springs. Rancho Aguaje de la Centinela included parts of present-day Westchester and Inglewood.

== History ==
Rancho Ajuaje de la Centinela, was once part of the Rancho Sausal Redondo, and Ygnacio Machado had encroached on the land claimed by Antonio Avila, and was awarded provisional title to this land at the same time that Antonio Avila received his land grant for the balance of the Rancho Sausal Redondo in 1837. In 1845, Machado traded the rancho to Bruno Avila, brother of Antonio Avila, for a small tract in the Pueblo of Los Angeles.

With the cession of California to the United States following the Mexican–American War, the 1848 Treaty of Guadalupe Hidalgo provided that the land grants would be honored. As required by the Land Act of 1851, a claim for Rancho Aguaje de la Centinela was filed with the Public Land Commission in 1852, and the grant was patented to Bruno Avila in 1872.

Bruno Avila, unable to repay his debts, lost his property through foreclosure in 1857. According to Historic Spots in California, Hilliard P. Dorsey bought it at a sheriff's sale for about $1 an acre. Then Dorsey was shot and killed by his father-in-law in what was determined to be a case of self-defense, and Dorsey's widow sold it for 35 cents an acre to Francis I. Carpenter in 1859, who in turn sold it to Joseph Lancaster Brent. Robert Burnett acquired the Rancho Ajuaje de la Centinela from Joseph Lancaster Brent in 1860, shortly thereafter Brent went off to become a brigadier general in the Confederate army. In 1868, Burnett added the Rancho Sausal Redondo to his holdings, joining the two ranchos again. Burnett returned to Scotland in 1873, and leased the 25,000 acres (101 km^{2}) of the combined ranchos to Catherine Freeman (wife of Daniel Freeman), with an agreement that she could eventually buy the ranchos outright. After Catherine's death in 1874, Daniel Freeman began the commercial development of the real estate. He became one of the directors of the Centinela Land Company, which started in 1874, with the purpose of developing commercially the Rancho Centinela. The venture failed, but Freeman was central in another undertaking, that of the Centinela-Inglewood Land Company, in 1887, to develop what would be known as the town of Inglewood.

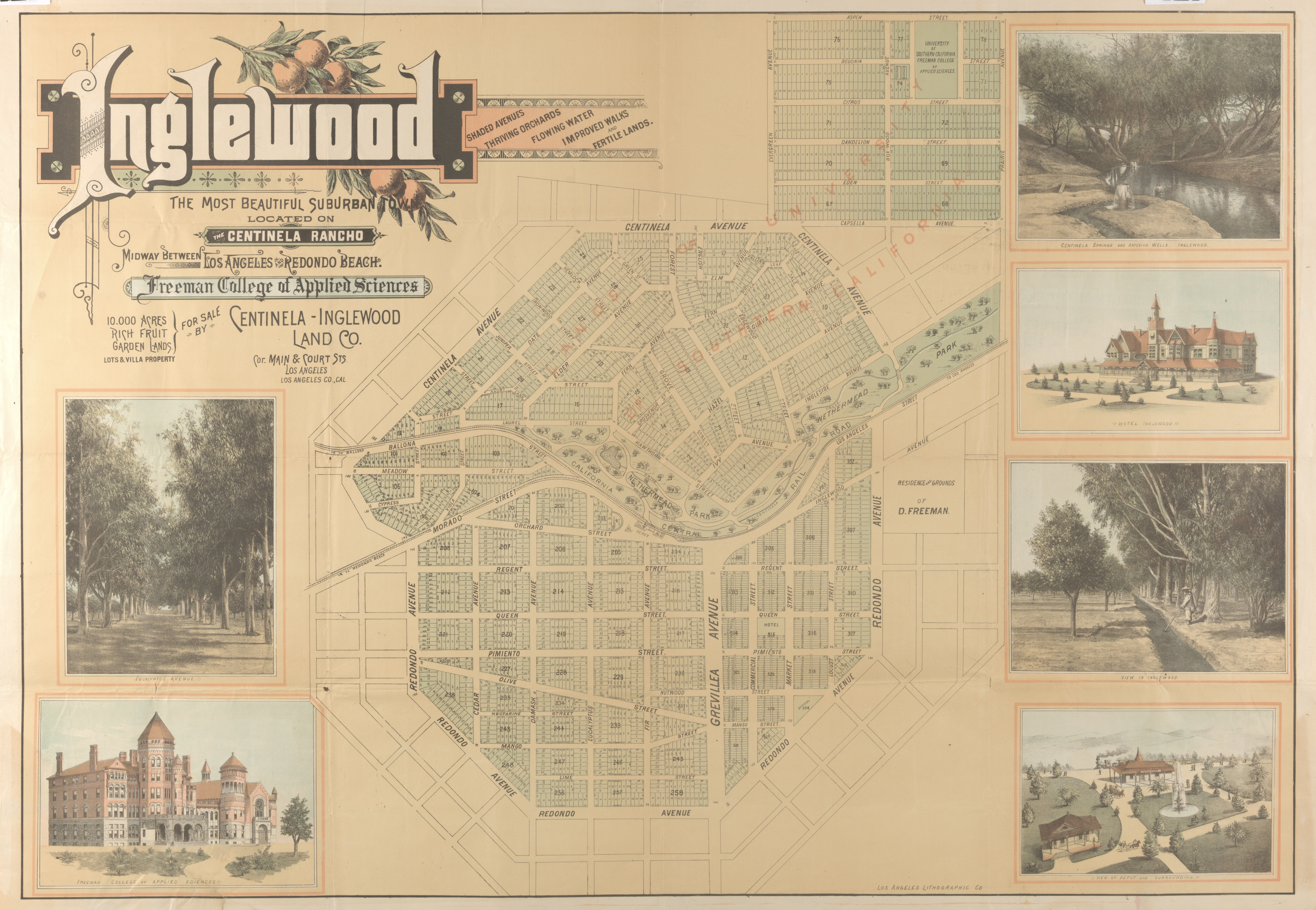
The Centinela-Inglewood Land Co. touted a "University of Southern California Daniel Freeman College of Applied Sciences" but it was never constructed

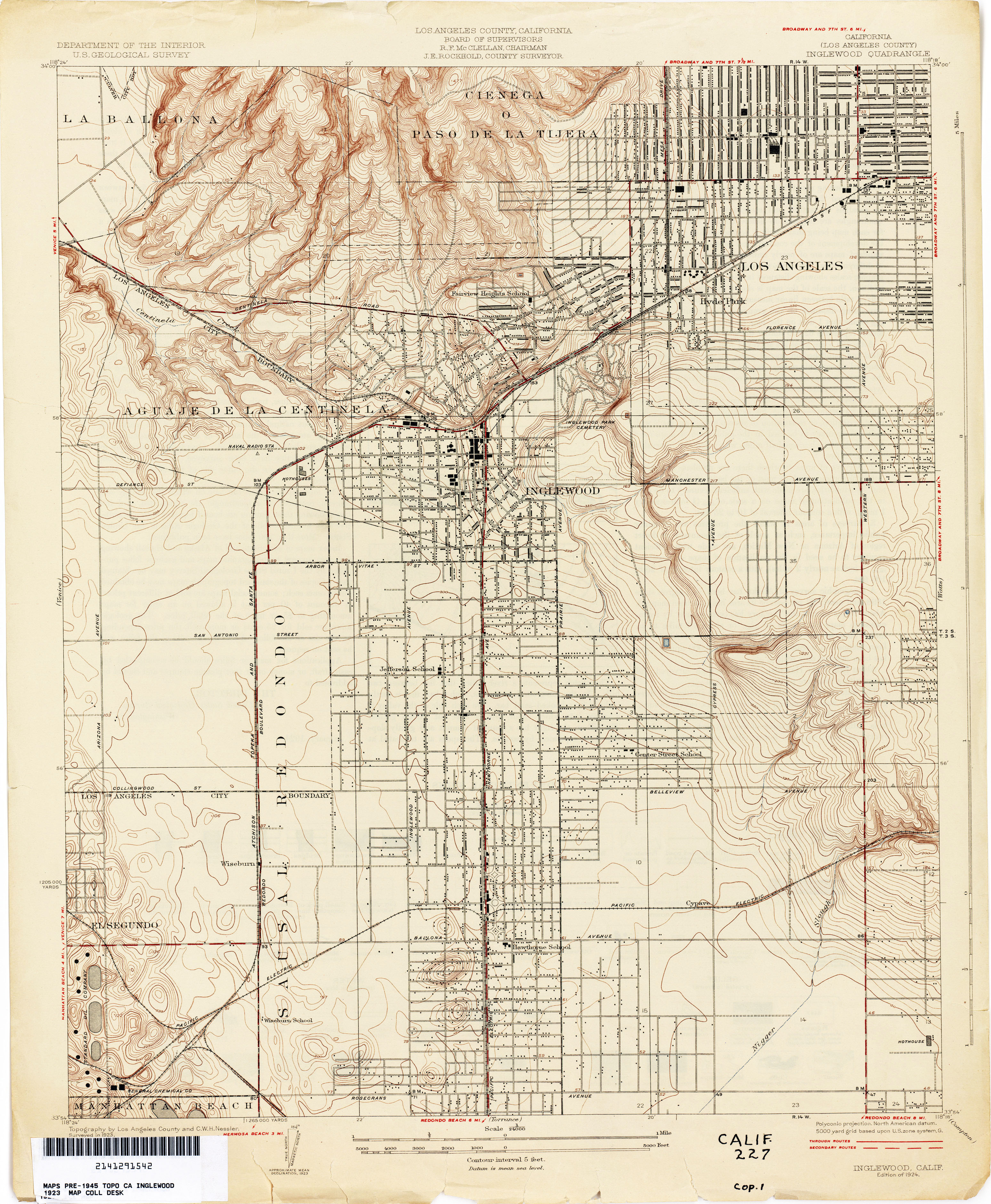
USGS topographical map 1924 edition, including Rancho Aguaje de la Centinela

== Marker and correction ==
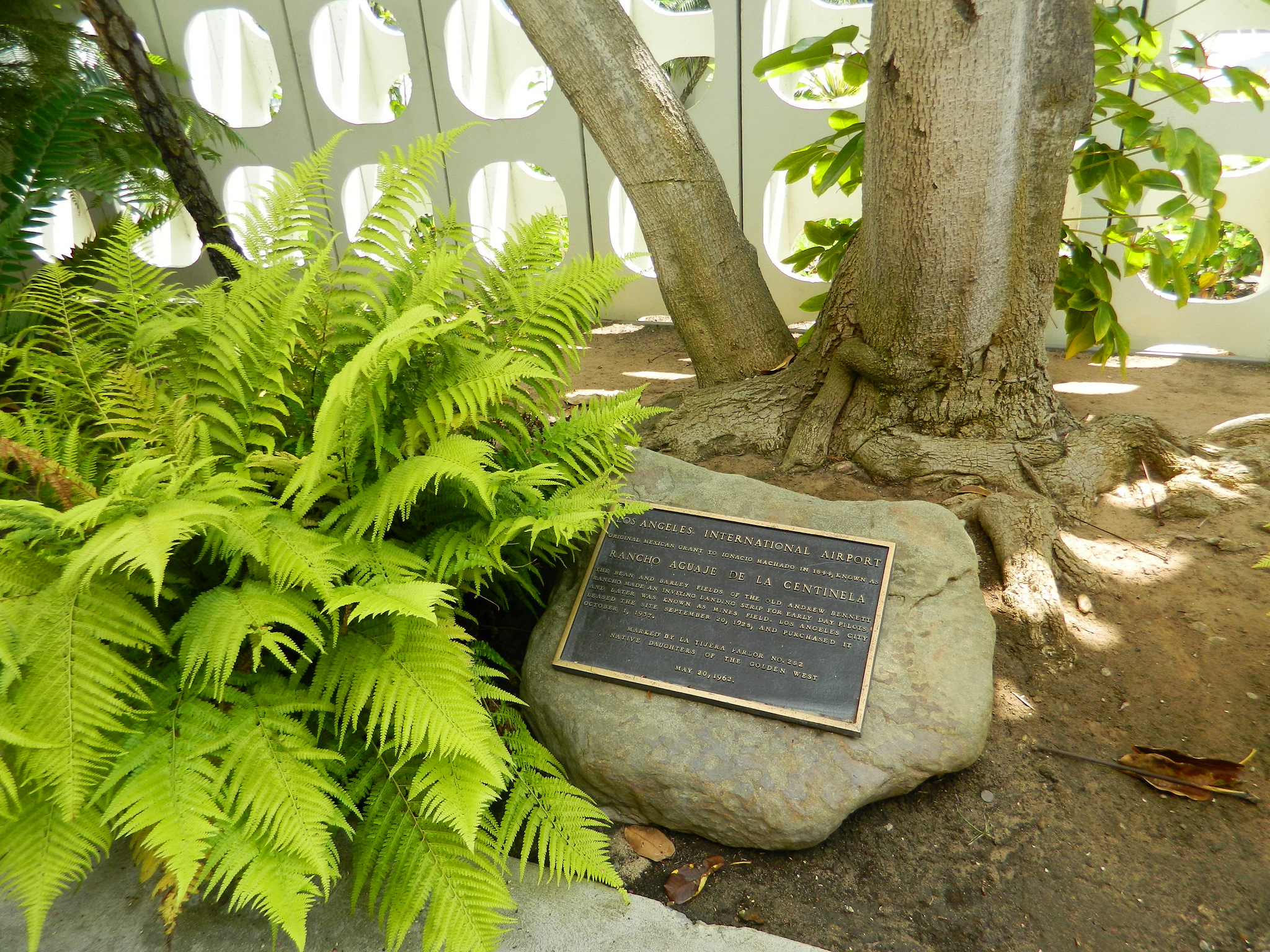
Historical marker placed at LAX Theme Building

The local chapter of the Native Daughters of the Golden West placed a marker mentioning Rancho Aguaje de la Centinela at the Theme Building of the Los Angeles International Airport in 1962.

The following letter appeared in the Los Angeles Times on Sept. 14, 1963.

ERROR CITED IN AIRPORTS RANCHO MARKER

I’m surprised that a bronze marker at Los Angeles International Airport could show wrong information. The marker bears the words: “Original Mexican grant to Ignacio Machado in 1844 known as Rancho Aguaje de Centinela.”

No part of International Airport is within Rancho Centinela. All of the airport is within Rancho Sausal Redondo.

The nearest part of Rancho Centinela is 3700 ft from airport property.

I hope the wrong marker was changed. I like my history to be facts not fiction.

David I. Worsfold, Palms

== Related locations ==
- Centinela Springs. Bubbling springs once flowed here.
- Centinela Adobe is an adobe house constructed in 1834 by Ygnacio Machado.
- Centinela Creek, a tributary of Ballona Creek
- Centinela Park in Inglewood now Edward Vincent Jr. Park

== See also ==
- List of rancho land grants in Los Angeles County, California
