= Centinela Springs =

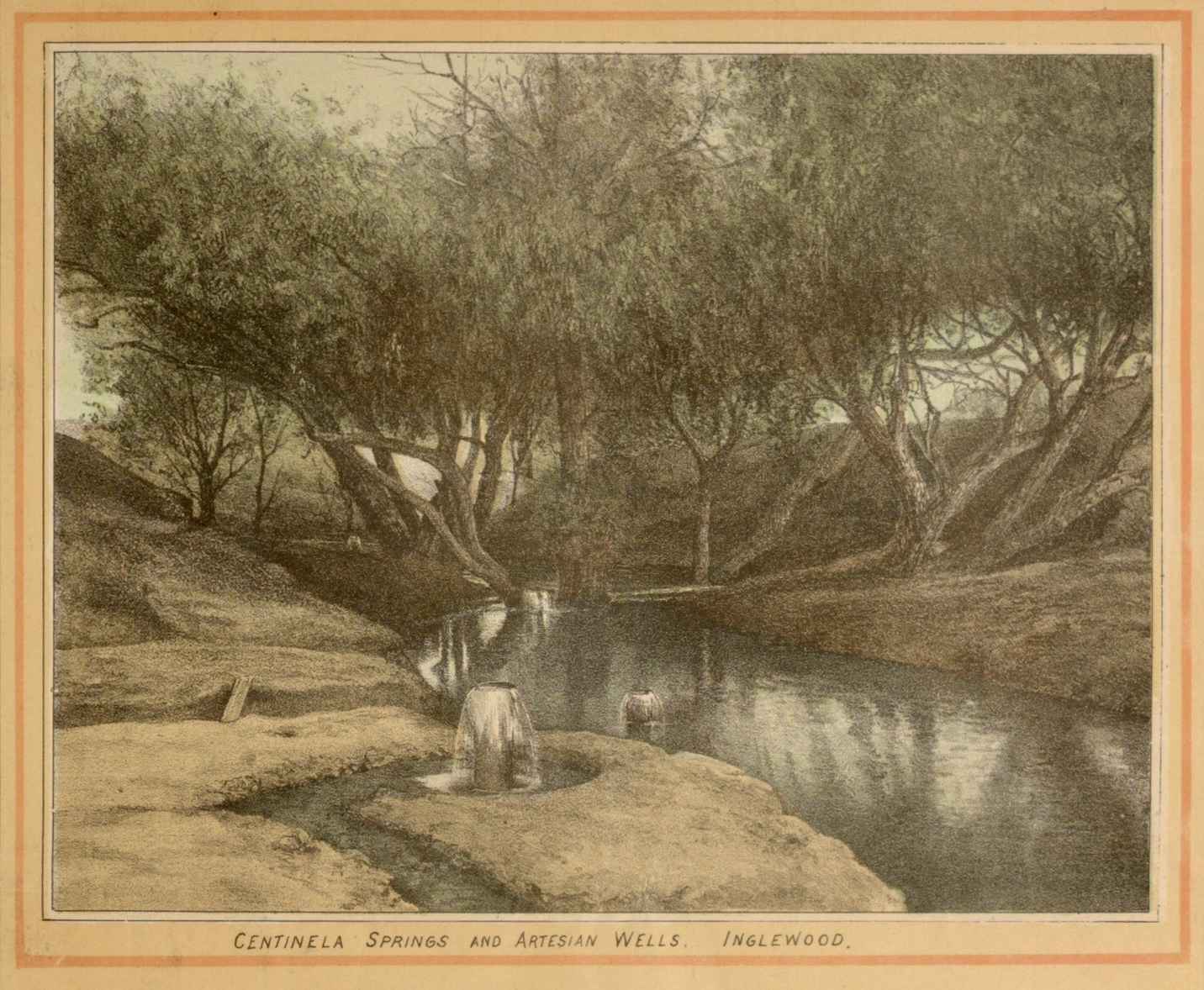
- "Centinela Springs and Artesian Wells" in Inglewood, from 1888 promotional map (CSL 1999-0121)
- Location: Centinela Park, Inglewood, California
- Coordinates: 33.9744°N 118.3426°W

California Historical Landmark
- Reference no.: 363

The Aguaje de Centinela, or Centinela Springs, was a valued source of local spring water for Rancho Aguaje de la Centinela and what is now southwest Los Angeles and Inglewood in Southern California. The spring was known to prehistoric people and animals but the name aguaje, meaning watering place, comes from Spanish–Mexican era of California history.

== Hydrology/history ==
"The springs are still supplying water for the inhabitants of these great ranchos, but there is an ominous note in the predictions of those best informed in such matters, that there is daily being taken from the seemingly inexhaustible underground pools of water more than nature is putting back, and that someday there will be a reckoning."

— History of Inglewood (1938)

The springs were “known to the Indians from ancient times,” and the Mexican land grant of 1837 that encompassed the land that is today Inglewood was named after the springs, the “sentinel of waters,” thus Rancho Aguaje de la Centinela. (Aguaje here means “water hole.”)

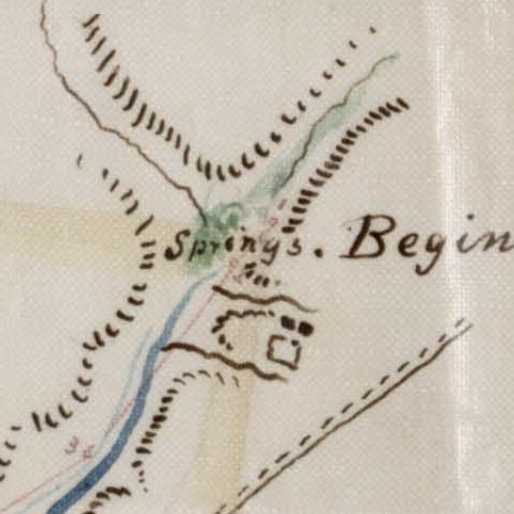
Centinela Springs marked the northeastern corner of Rancho Aguaje de la Centinela and, according to this 1866 plat map, were a source for Centinela Creek, which in the 19th century fed the Ballona Wetlands independent of Ballona Creek (Huntington Library SR-Map-0002.02)

The spring water was used for watering livestock and agriculture during most of the 19th century. In early days, “Water was once diverted from the runoff of Centinela Springs, from the big draw, along Grevillea Street, as far as Olive Street and thence to Oak Street. The canal was lined with willows, and the stream was used to water sheep.”

According to a history of groundwater management in the west basin region of Los Angeles, “In the late 1800s, ground water levels were very high, with heavy artesian flow from wells and swampy conditions in low-lying lands. Around 1870, the West Basin communities of Inglewood and Long Beach began to tap artesian wells and springs in the area of the Newport-Inglewood Uplift.” According to a latter-day Inglewood water engineer, “The largest Centinela spring was located near the present site of the swimming pool” at Centinela Park.

Circa 1887, ”Colonel W.H. Hall, ex-state engineer, has discovered by experimenting than an extensive artesian belt underlies the country between Los Angeles and Centinela Springs, and solves the problem that water can be obtained in this section by artesian wells.” The springs were described in an 1888 California state report on the “irrigation question”:

“South and west of the main crest of the Centinela hills, at the head of an arroyo which, cutting into their western slope, leads around three or four miles into Ballona Creek, opposite the irrigation district just described, is an uprising of waters known as the Centinela Springs. This is probably an output of the same general artesian source lying east of the ridge, caused by the overlapping of some of the permeable gravel strata through a low sag in the primary formation. Indeed, borings, which have been made, quite well establish this idea.

“Water-supply and use—The springs naturally flowed twenty to thirty miner’s inches, and have recently been developed to yield something over fifty inches, as explained elsewhere. The waters were, for a number of years, used in a comparatively rude fashion in the irrigation of a mixed orchard, containing about one hundred and forty acres [140 acres (0.57 km^{2})], near a mile [1 mile (1.6 km)] away, and to which they were led in a little earthen ditch. Now they are piped into a reservoir and in part pumped to a higher reservoir for the service, under pressure, of the town of Inglewood.”

Also in 1888 an Inglewood booster wrote the Los Angeles Herald of a “tunnel near Centinela Springs…being dug to tap additional springs, which have been located by the engineers.”

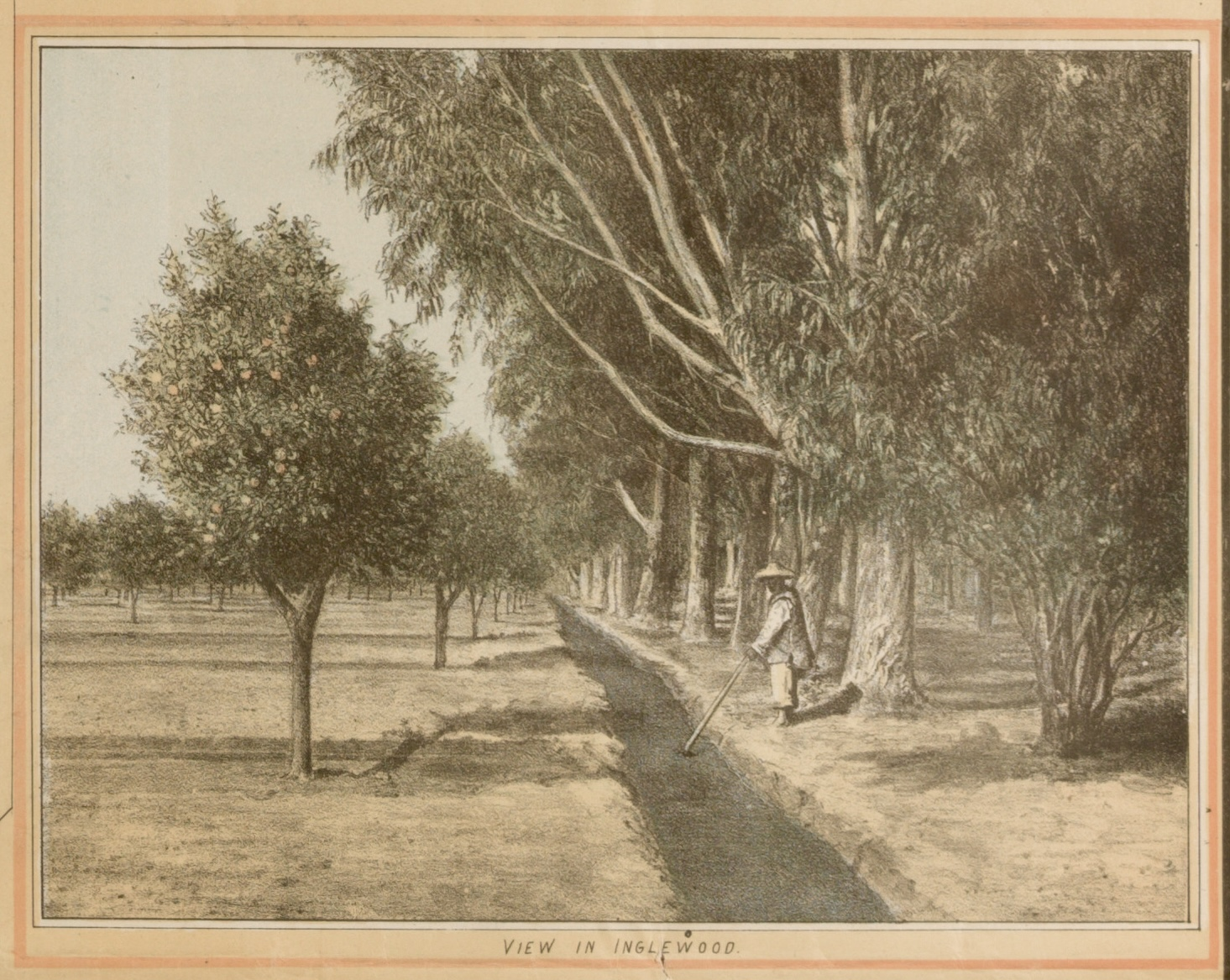
"View in Inglewood" - Centinela draw irrigation canal, 1888

An 1890 report to the U.S. Congress said the springs had been developed by “excavation and artesian wells.” Daily capacity at that time was 900,000 [no units listed; U.S. gallons?]. A book about California produced for the 1893 World's Fair reported, “[The town of Inglewood] is well-supplied with water from the celebrated Centinela springs, which is distributed by gravity, all over the townsite through an elaborate system of pipes.” More wells were dug in 1895: “Mr. D. Freeman has just completed two wells north of his ranch house, and is now developing more artesian water at Centinela springs. One hundred inches of water is now flowing, and as there is an abundance of water at a depth of 100 feet, several hundred more inches will he secured for irrigation in Olive Branch colony, south of town.”

WATER SUPPLY—Source, Inglewood springs and artesian wells; system pumping to reservoir, capacity 500,000 gals.; pump, dy. capacity 1,250,000 gals.; 3 hydrants; pipe 18 miles; 105 taps. Waterworks owned by company; ann. ex. $750.

The city of Inglewood was incorporated in 1908 and as of the 1910 census had a population of 1,536. When the land from which the springs flowed was still owned by an independent water company (prior to acquisition by the City of Inglewood), likely in the early 1910s, “Once at an exposition at the Shrine Auditorium in Los Angeles the water company’s exhibit consisted of samples of Inglewood water, and it proved so popular with the thousands who sampled it, that [J. Warren] Lane conceived the idea of selling bottled water from Centinela Springs, and the idea had advanced to the stage where it was proposed to put white tile and glass housing around the spring where the public could come and see under what clean and healthful condition the water was bottled.”

“Centinela Springs used to gush from the ground, as did wells elsewhere in this Valley, at Pomona and elsewhere, while now the water level is 150 feet (46 m) or farther beneath the surface,” reported the Los Angeles Times in 1936. There was concern that “the water level here and elsewhere in the Southland has sunk to such an extent that many of the finest old trees of original pioneer plantings are now dying from lack of moisture and plant food…Mr. [Warren] Lane planted many of the old trees nearly half a century ago.”.

By the early 1930s, water extraction had “overdrawn” the bank of groundwater in the area: “The entire coastal area of West Basin from Ballona Escarpment to Palos Verdes Hills was intruded by salt water [flowing inland underground from the Pacific Ocean].”

In Roy Rosenberg's History of Inglewood: Narrative and Biographical (1938), two years after the first report of concern in the Los Angeles Times, the water was already 10 feet (3.0 m) lower: “The water level has lowered from the time it gushed out as a veritable cascade from Centinela Springs until now it has to be pumped 160 ft (49 m) below the surface of the ground, and is lowering at a rate of 4 ft (1.2 m) per year.”

By the time of the 1940 census, the population of Inglewood had increased to 30,114, and demand on municipal water was growing apace. In 1949, the city of Inglewood petitioned to join the Metropolitan Water District of Southern California and joined the West Basin Water Association at the same time, effectively ending its era of groundwater extraction.

At the time of the placement of the California Historic Landmark recognition in 1970, Inglewood's chief water engineer reported that none of the existing wells were deep enough to reach whatever remained of the aquifer below the park.

== Monuments ==
California Historical Landmark marker 363 is located at the corner of Centinela Ave. and Florence Blvd. in the city of Inglewood, California, and is one of two monuments to the tapped-out Centinela Springs located in Edward Vincent Jr. Park (formerly Centinela Park).

The older springs monument at the park dates to the Great Depression era and was designed by Archibald Garner, who also created the “Centinela Springs” mahogany wood carving for the New Deal Section of Fine Arts at the Hillcrest Avenue post office building. The text of the first marker, which was originally designed to offer separate drinking fountains for man, horse and dog, reads:

FROM TIME IMMEMORIAL GOD'S BLESSING OF SWEET WATER TO ALL HIS CREATURES
MARKED BY CALIFORNIA HISTORY AND LANDMARKS CLUB MARCH 2, 1939

The newer marker was placed 30 years later and is part of the California Historic Landmarks system.

Text of California marker:

AGUAJE DE LA CENTINELA (CENTINELA SPRINGS)

ON THIS SITE BUBBLING SPRINGS ONCE FLOWED FROM THEIR SOURCE IN A DEEP WATER BASIN WHICH HAS EXISTED CONTINUOUSLY SINCE THE PLEISTOCENE ERA. PREHISTORIC ANIMALS, INDIANS, AND EARLY INGLEWOOD SETTLERS WERE ATTRACTED HERE BY THE PURE ARTESIAN WATER. THE SPRINGS AND VALLEY WERE NAMED AFTER SENTINELS GUARDING THE CATTLE IN THE AREA.

CALIFORNIA REGISTERED HISTORICAL LANDMARK NO. 363

PLAQUE PLACED BY THE STATE DEPARTMENT OF PARKS AND RECREATION IN COOPERATION WITH THE HISTORICAL SOCIETY OF CENTINELA VALLEY, OCTOBER 9, 1976.

== Gallery ==
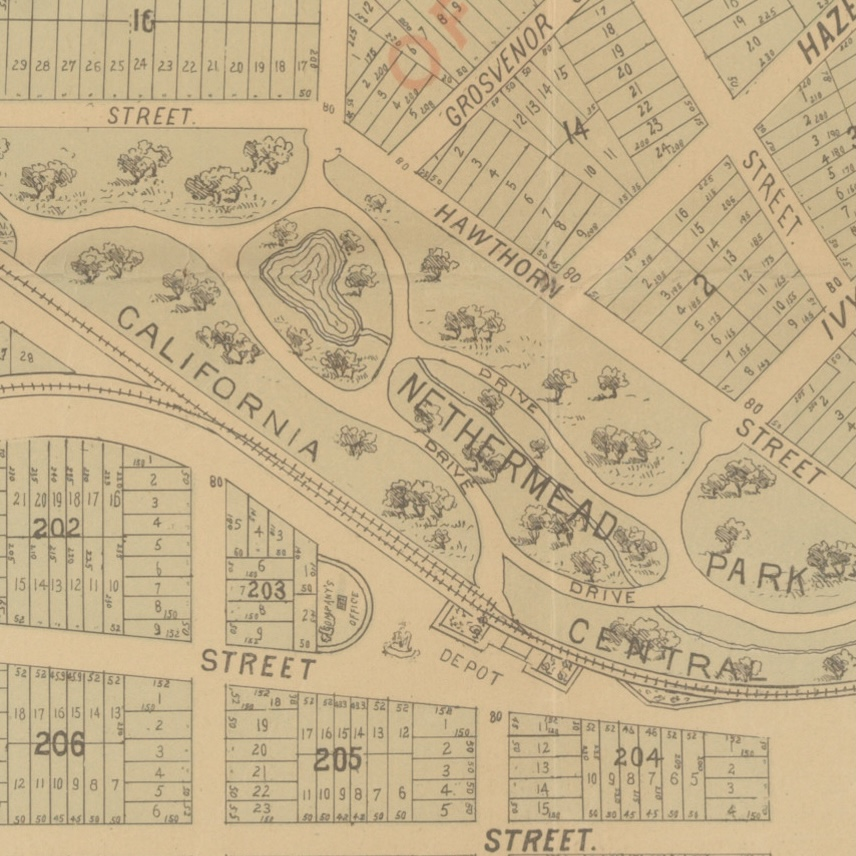
Centinela Creek, Centinela Springs pond, Centinela Park, and Inglewood Depot, with rail lines to Port Ballona and Redondo Beach via Redondo Junction, 1888

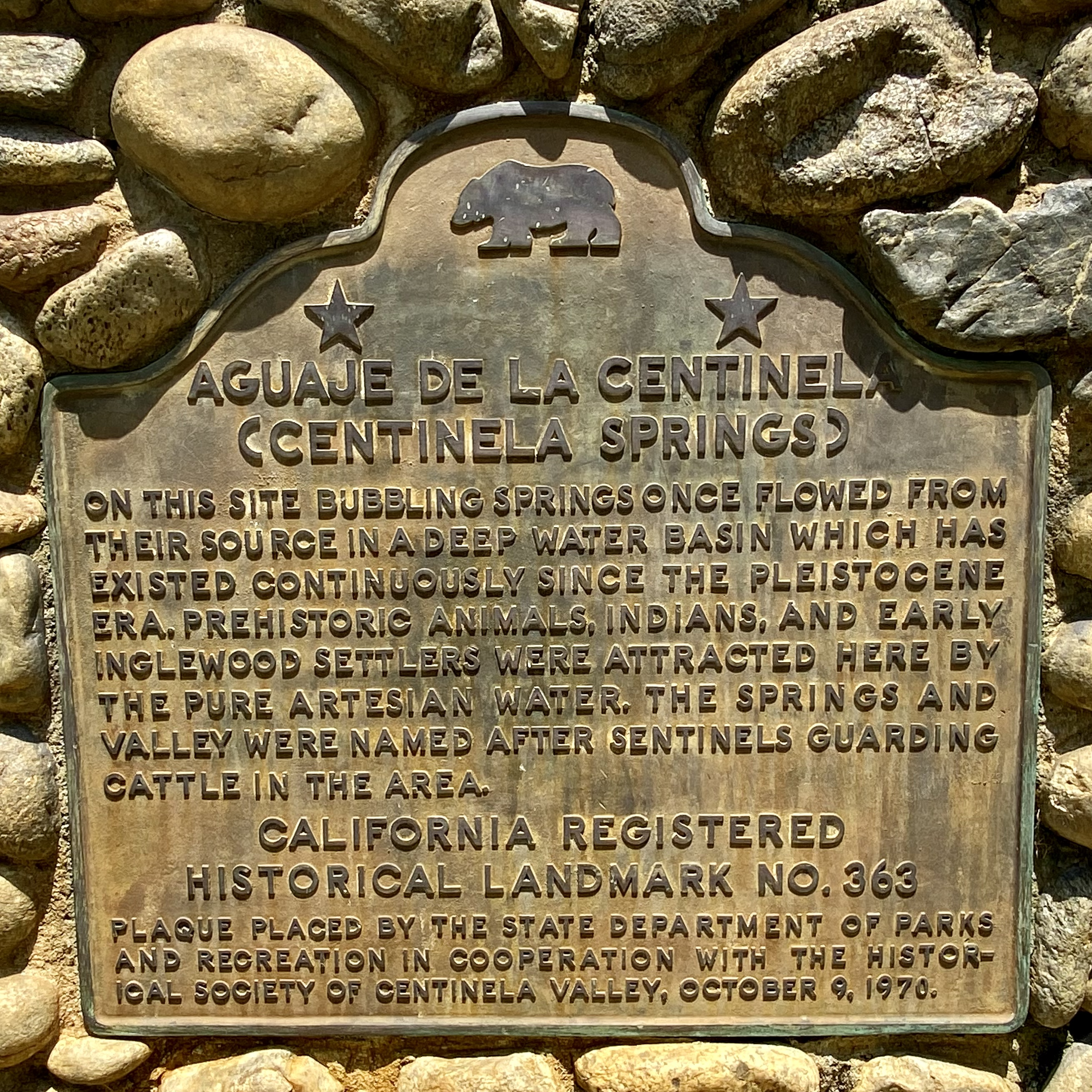
1970 marker

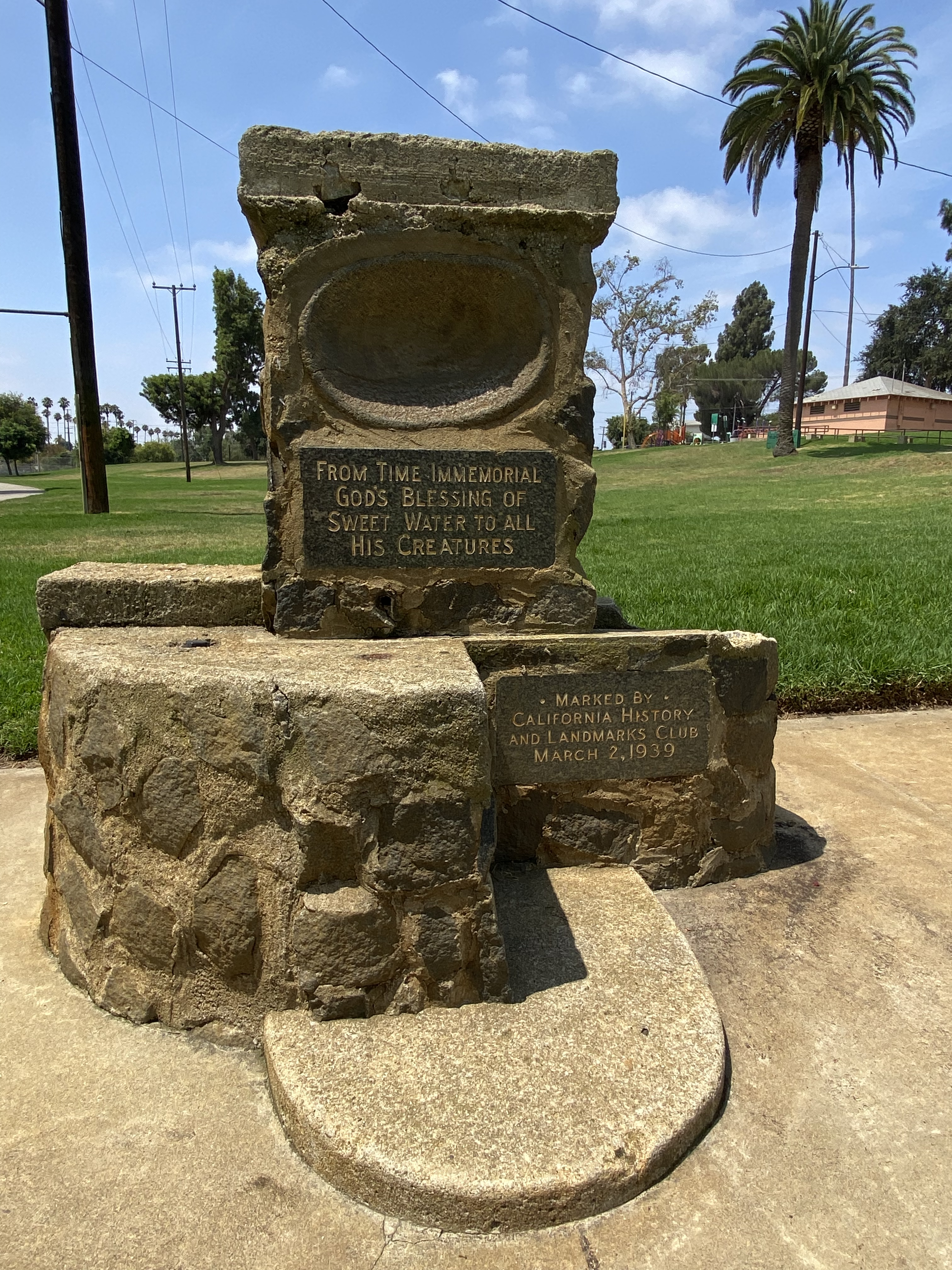
1939 marker

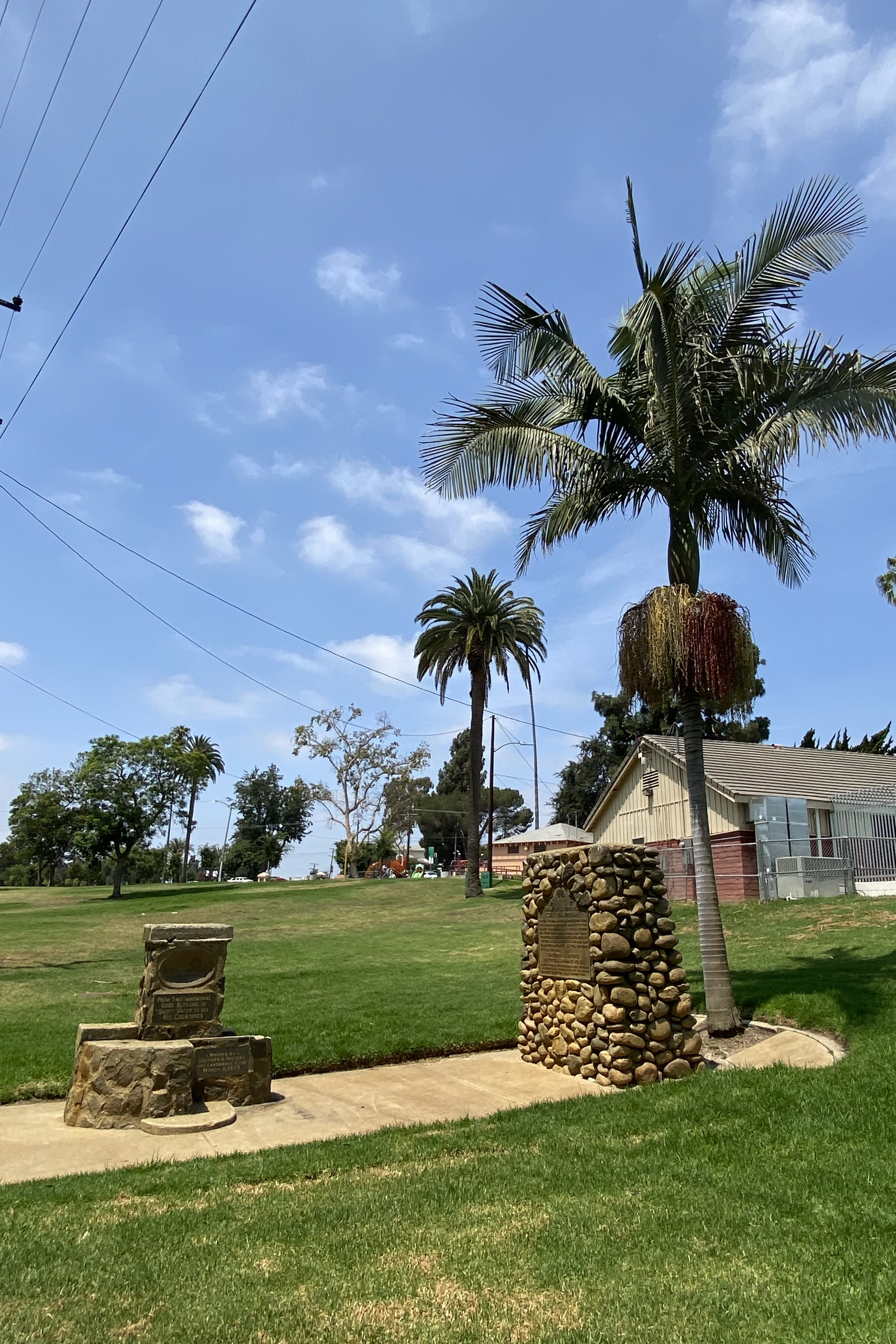
Both historic markers at Edward Vincent Jr. Park

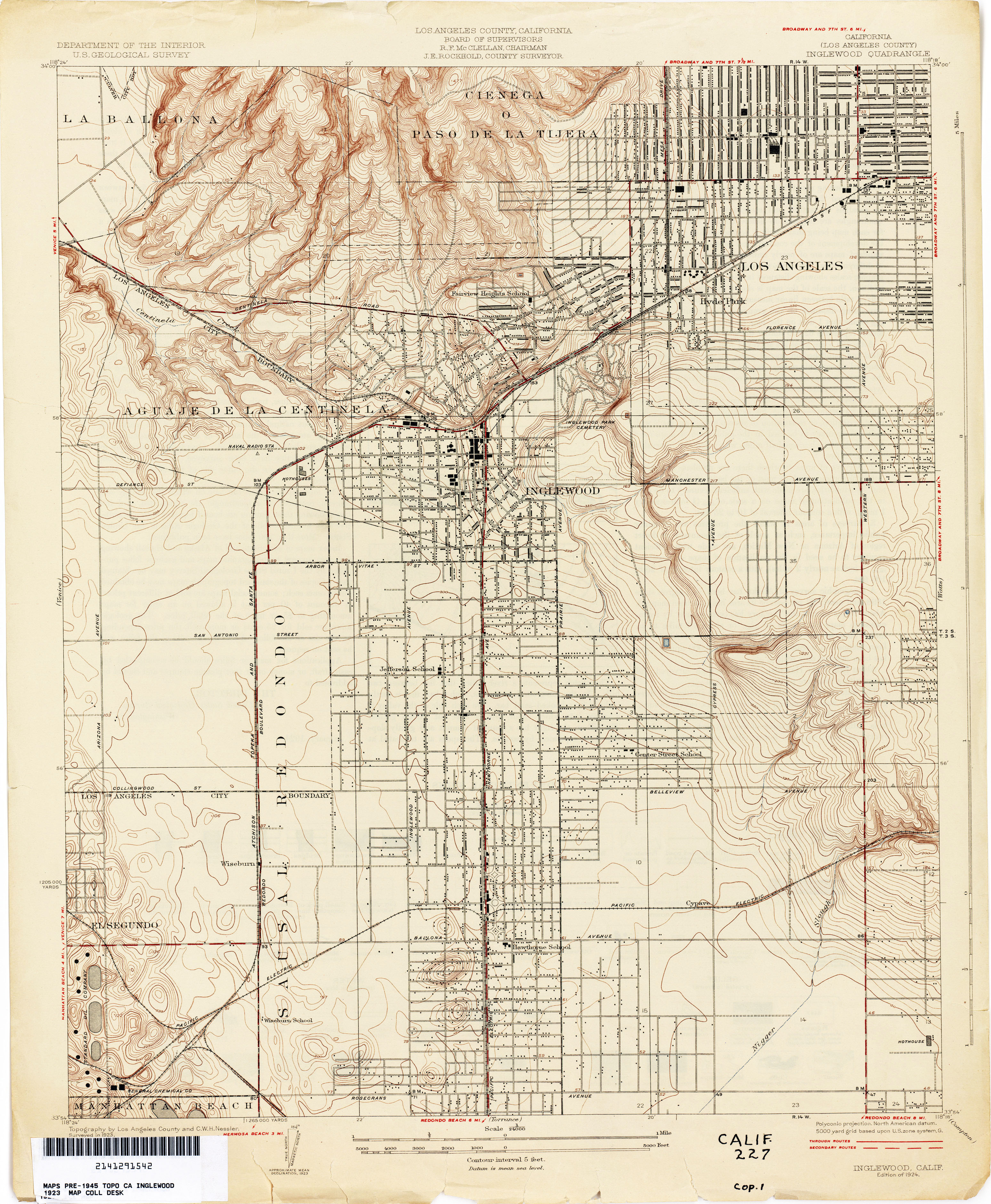
1924 USGS topographical map of the area

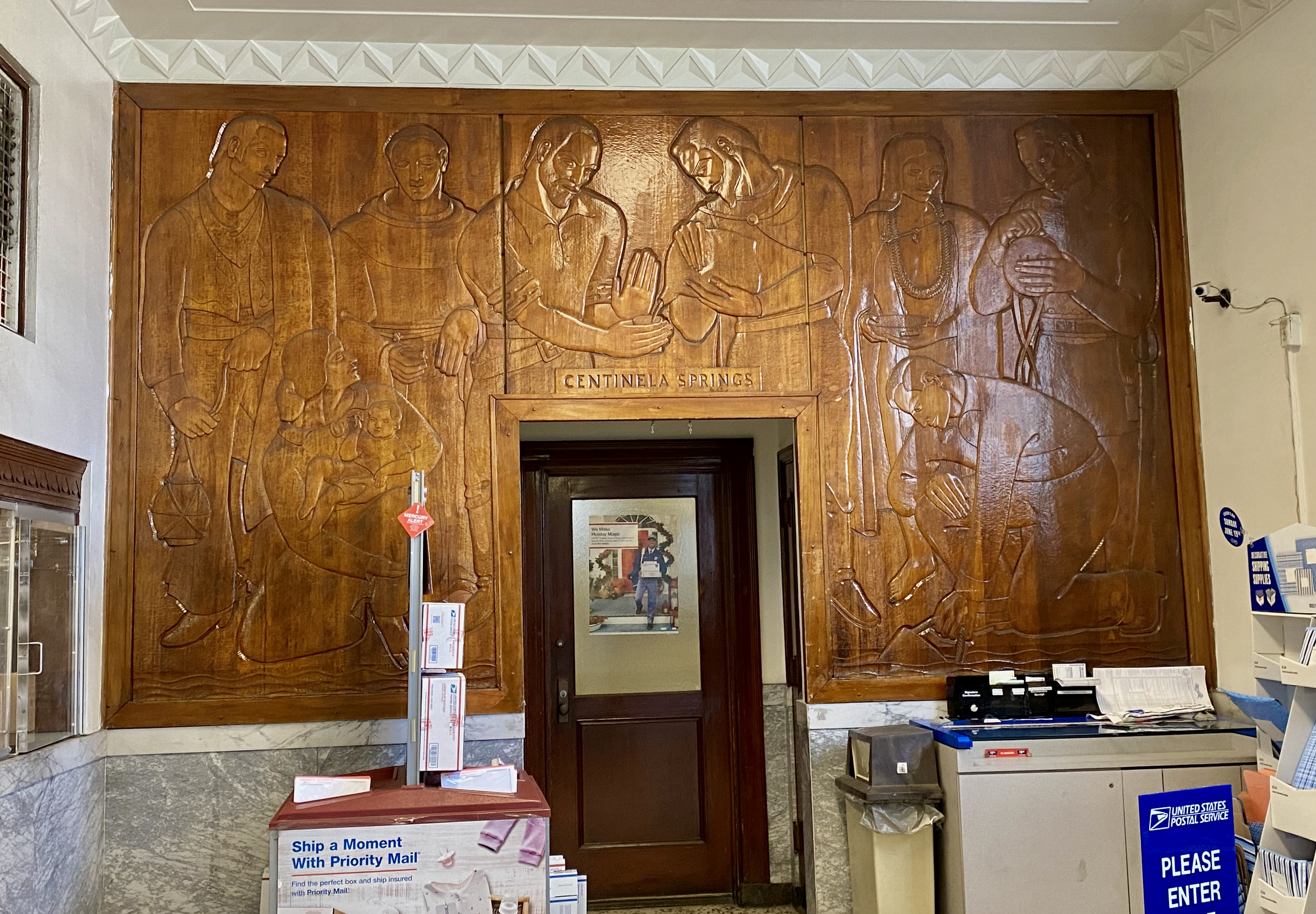
New Deal-era wood carving “Centinela Springs,” Hillcrest Avenue post office

== See also ==
- Saltwater intrusion in California
- Coastal hydrogeology – Branch of hydrogeology
- Rancho Aguaje de la Centinela – Pre-statehood California land grant
- Inglewood & South Bay – Pre-statehood California land grant
- Centinela Adobe – Historic house in Los Angeles, California
- Centinela Park – Historic municipal park in Inglewood, California
