= Hilliard P. Dorsey =

American soldier and vigilante (1821–1858)

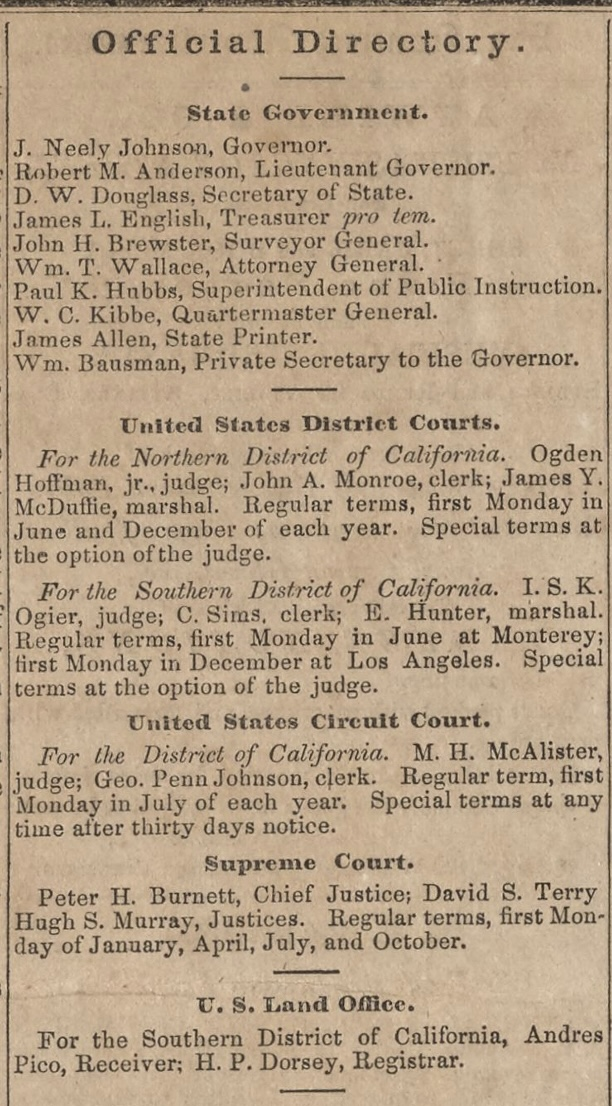
- Andrés Pico and Hilliard P. Dorsey ran the U.S. land office in southern California in 1857
- Born: c. 1820; Georgia, United States
- Died: September 6, 1858; El Monte Township, Los Angeles County, California, United States
- Occupations: Military officer, land agent, land owner

Hilliard P. Dorsey (c. 1820 – September 6, 1858) was an officer in the Mexican–American War, U.S. federal land agent, vigilante, duellist, and, briefly, owner of the Rancho Aguaje de la Centinela in California. Dorsey's father-in-law shot and killed him in 1858.

== Biography ==
Dorsey, who was apparently from Habersham County, Georgia, had served in the Mexican–American War as an officer of the Mississippi Rifles. Future Confederate general J. Patton Anderson recruited and organized Company C of the regiment known as "Anderson's Rifles," but when Anderson was elevated to lieutenant-colonel in February 1848, Dorsey took over as company captain. One of the soldiers in Dorsey's unit was John N. Forrest, brother of future Confederate general Nathan Bedford Forrest. Captain Dorsey of Company C returned from Mexico to Mississippi on June 21, 1848, on the Iona.

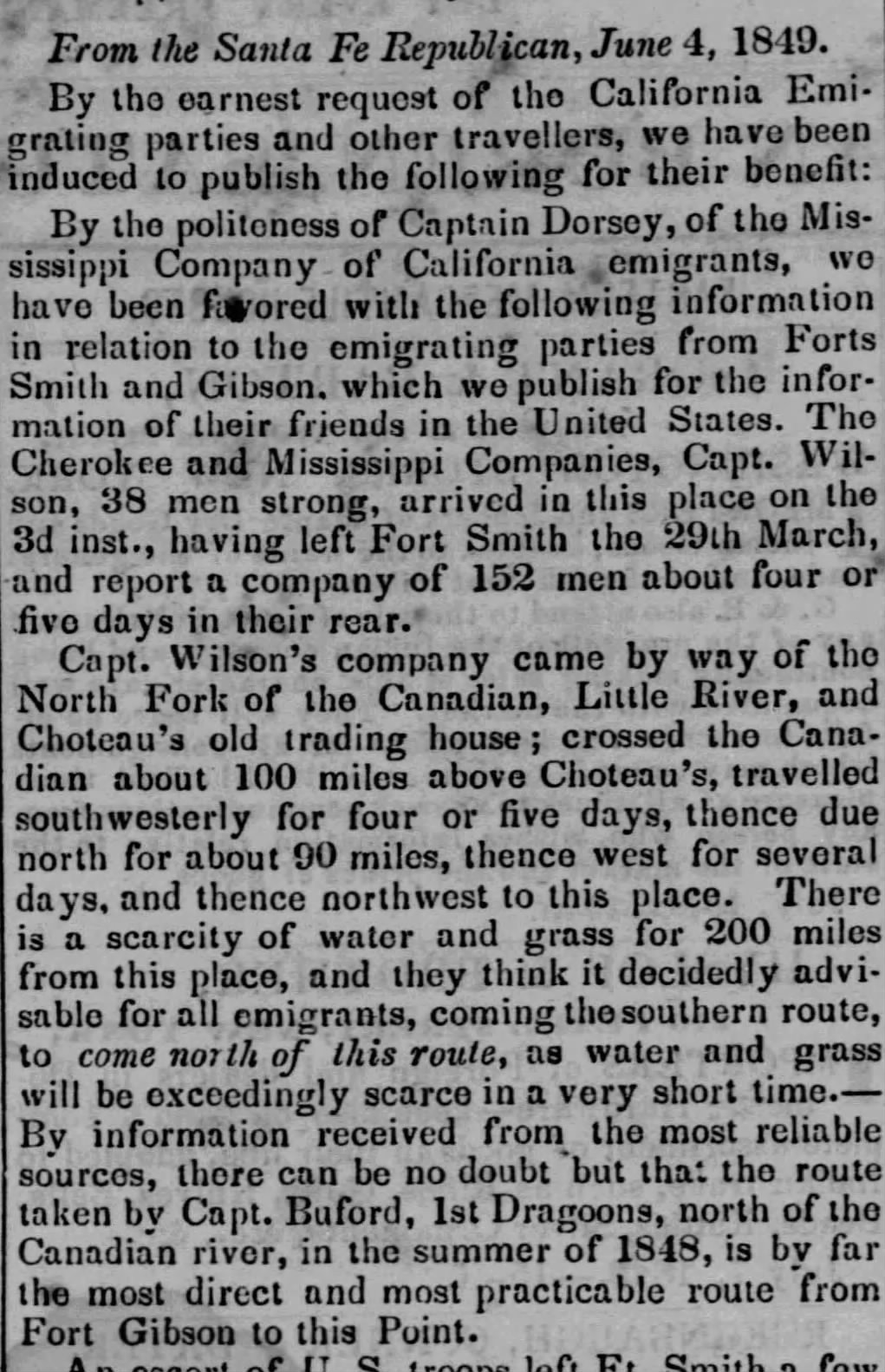
News from the California Road in the Arkansas Intelligencer, July 14, 1849

In early 1849, Dorsey may have been one of the American mercenary soldiers involved in the Yucatán Caste War. Dorsey came to California in 1849 as part of a train of gold-rush migrants traveling via the Arkansas River–Canadian River–Gila River route from Fort Smith, Arkansas, through Santa Fe, New Mexico, a route later known as the California Road. Dorsey's group celebrated Independence Day 1849 in Socorro, New Mexico; "Marshaled by Captain H. P. Dorsey, the men fired a salute of four rounds. Then came a feast of lamb, spiced by bottles of treasured Holland gin, cognac, and champagne, preceded by a fandango well-attended by Mexican señoritas." Once settled in California, Dorsey joined a Masonic lodge, and he worked for the U.S. General Land Office. Dorsey was said to be a pioneer of walnut cultivation in Southern California. In California he was involved in vigilante killings and body desecration in the wake of the murder of a local sheriff, and developed a fearsome reputation as a Bowie-knife-wielding brawler, in one case popping a man's eye out. According to a history of the old Bella Union Hotel in what is now the downtown core of Los Angeles, "At that period dueling was still practiced to some extent. It happened that a fight in the Bella Union barroom led to a duel later at Clinton, near San Francisco. A man named Bevin, from Tejon, cowardly attacked the Registrar of the Land Office, H. P. Dorsey; and each accused the other of being a rascal. A gun in the hands of Dorsey went off. The men were finally separated by the crowd. When they met up north, they exchanged shots [and] were arrested, but their cases were dismissed." As historian Hubert Howe Bancroft told it, Dorsey was caught up in "mania for duels" in California in the year 1854: "The 22d of September Rasey Biven of Stockton, and H. P. Dorsey of Los Angeles, met near Oakland. The seconds of Dorsey were Governor McDougal and Mr. Watson. Surgeon, C. M. Hitchcock. Seconds of Biven, Senator Crabb and Mr. Randolph. Surgeon, Briarly. Weapons, duelling pistols. Distance, ten paces. Word was given by Biven's friends. At the first fire Dorsey was wounded in the abdomen, and Biven in the wrist."

In 1857, Bruno Avila, who had been owner of the Mexican land grant Rancho Centinela de la Aguaje since 1845, was unable to make his mortgage, and lost his property through foreclosure. According to Historic Spots in California, Dorsey bought the cattle ranch for about $1 an acre at a sheriff's sale.

== Death ==
Dorsey was shot and killed by his father-in-law, William W. Rubottom, in September 1858 after Dorsey assaulted his wife Civility Susan Rubottom Dorsey and appeared to threaten their child. "Uncle Billy" Rubottom ran the Butterfield Stage station at Spadra. As retold in a 1920 history of the Spadra area, now known as Pomona, California:

The father would defend his daughter; the husband would have his wife. Both were of Southern blood, fearless and unyielding. Both had fought to the death before. It was Uncle Billy who called out, 'Dorsey, you can not come in.' And Dorsey, still advancing, said, 'I'll have my wife or die in the attempt.' 'Stop,' said Uncle Billy, 'not another step.' But Dorsey, reaching up and plucking a leaf from the hedge, put the stem in his mouth and came steadily on, tossing Uncle Billy one of his brace of dueling pistols as he advanced. At the same moment Uncle Billy reached for his shotgun and fired the fatal shot.

A version reported to the Sacramento Bee in 1858 by a visitor from San Francisco claimed that Charity R. Dorsey's older sister was involved:

At this moment one of the daughters of Mr. Rubottom and a married woman ran out of the house towards Captain Dorsey and as he attempted to step up on the porch, she placed her hands against his shoulders and begged him not to enter the house. Her father in the mean time had left his seat and rushing into an adjoining room returned with a loaded shotgun. At the moment that the lady placed her hands against the shoulders of the Captain standing thus as she did immediately in front of him and between the two the Captain cocked his revolver and raised it as the old gentleman emerged from the door shot-gun in hand, when seeing the desperate intention of Dorsey she quickly wheeled and retaining bold of him with one hand she cried out to her father to shoot quickly. The parties fired simultaneously Dorsey's ball missing its mark but the charge of buck shot taking deadly effect in the right bosom between the first and second ribs killing the Captain almost instantaneously. The daughter stood so near that her face and person were covered with blood as the full charge o' buck shot at about four paces distant struck in a solid body their unfortunate victim.

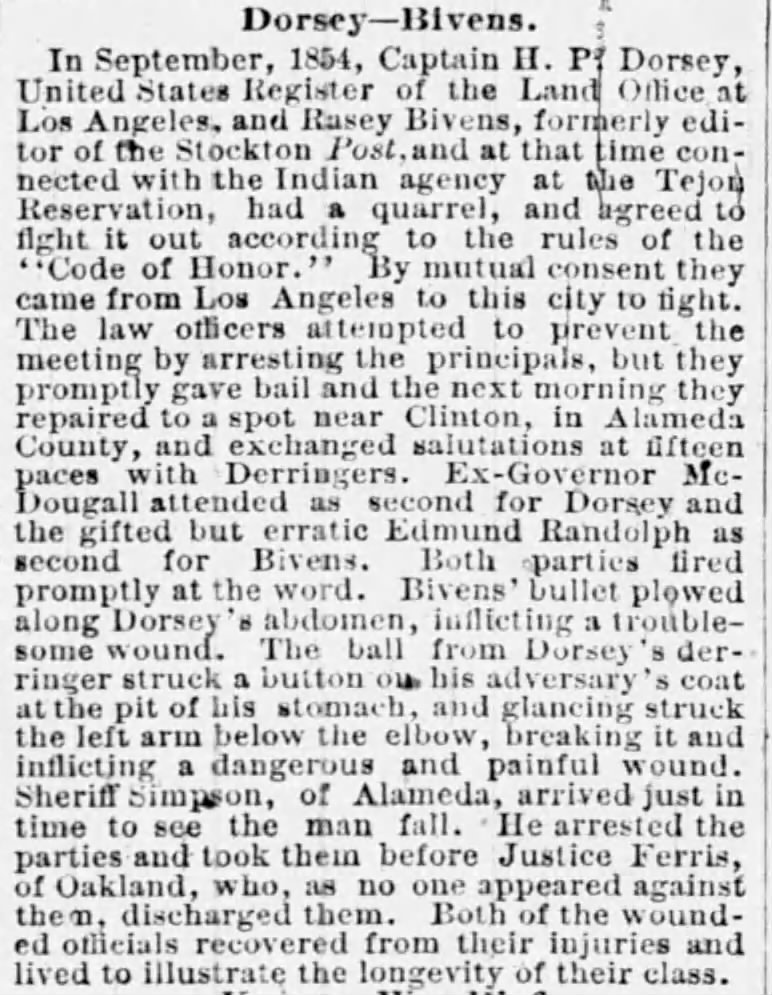
"Dorsey–Bivens" duel St. Louis Globe-Democrat, May 14, 1876

Apparently, "as both men had reputations for dueling and fighting, the townsfolk accepted that there was no fault in the death, and Rubottom did not face consequences for Hilliard's murder." In 1859, Charity R. Dorsey sold the cattle ranch in what is now Inglewood, California to Francis I. Carpenter for 35¢ an acre; Carpenter in turn sold it to Joseph Lancaster Brent. Robert Burnett acquired the Rancho Aguaje de la Centinela from Joseph Lancaster Brent in 1860; shortly thereafter Brent went off to become a brigadier general in the Confederate army. Although he had by then been dead for well over a year, Dorsey was enumerated in the 1860 census of Saline County, Arkansas in the household of his first wife, Jane Edwards Dorsey, and their several children. His other widow, Charity R. Greenwade (1840–1876), and her parents are buried at historic Spadra Cemetery in Pomona. Hilliard Dorsey's burial place is undocumented.

== See also ==
- Ranchos of California
- Butterfield Overland Mail in California
- California in the American Civil War
- List of duels in the United States
