= Centinela Adobe =

Historic house in Los Angeles, California

- U.S. National Register of Historic Places
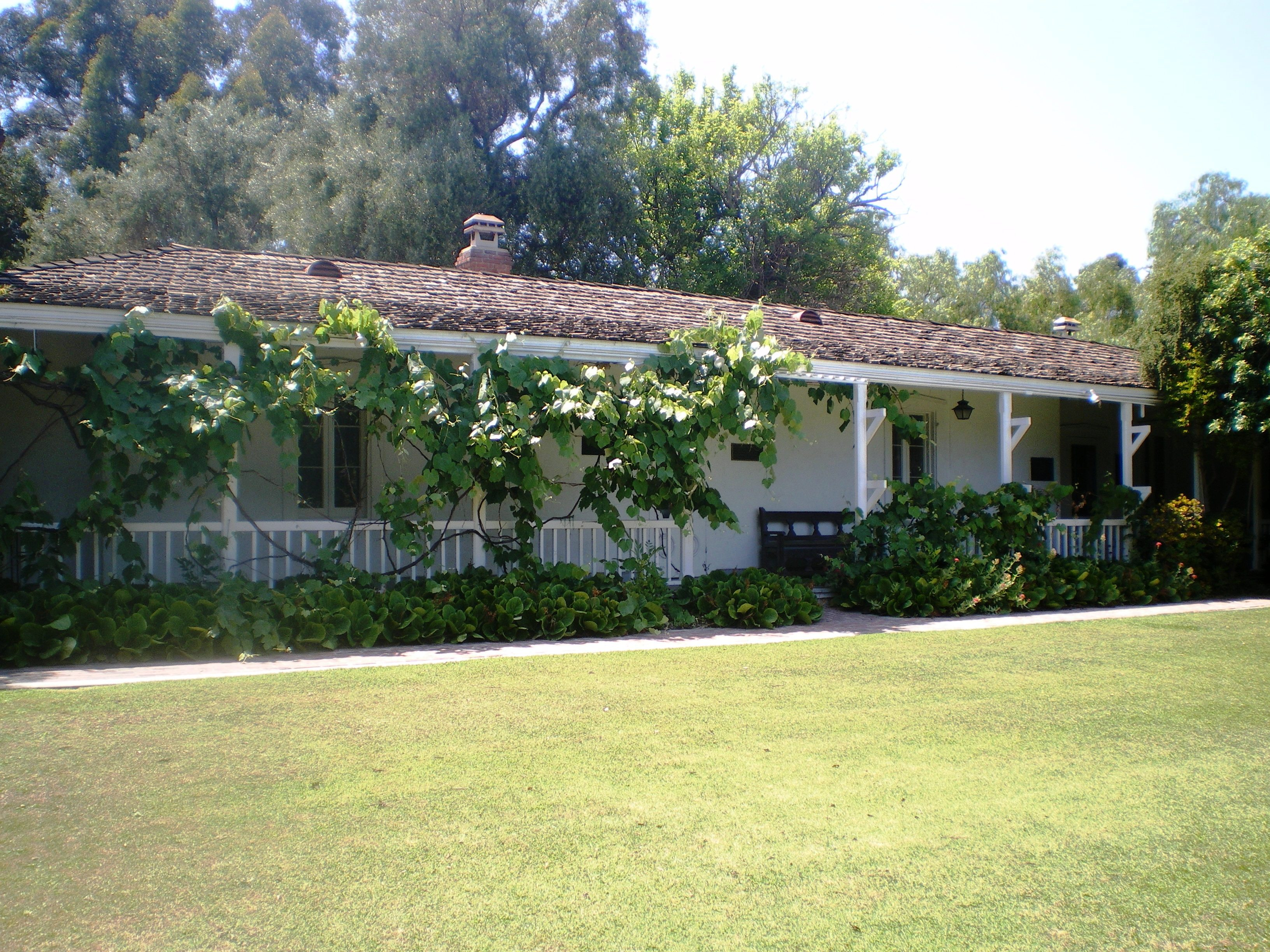
- The Centinela Adobe
- Location: 7634 Midfield Ave; Westchester, Los Angeles, California
- Coordinates: 33.96758°N 118.37226°W
- Built: 1834
- Architect: Ygnacio Machado
- Architectural style: Spanish Colonial-Adobe
- NRHP reference No.: 74000522
- Added to NRHP: May 2, 1974

The Centinela Adobe, also known as La Casa de la Centinela, is a Spanish Colonial style adobe house in Westchester, Los Angeles, California, built in 1834. It is operated as a house museum by the Historical Society of Centinela Valley, and it is one of the 43 surviving adobes within Los Angeles County, California. The Adobe was the seat of the 25,000-acre (100 km^{2}) Rancho Aguaje de la Centinela, a Mexican Alta California-era land grant partitioned from the Spanish Las Californias era Rancho Sausal Redondo centered around the Centinela Springs.

The Centinela Adobe, which is the Centinela Valley's oldest residence, was built by Ygnacio Machado in 1834. Since then, farmers, ranchers, a Scotsman, and Inglewood's founding father, Daniel Freeman, have lived in the structure. It is the oldest building in the area and has been called the "Birthplace of Inglewood".

== History of the Ranchos and Centinela Adobe ==
=== Antonio Ygnacio Avila ===
In 1822, after the Mexican War of Independence brought freedom for Mexico from Spain, Antonio Ygnacio Avila received a Mexican land grant for Rancho Sausal Redondo in Alta California, where he grazed cattle. The rancho's lands encompass the present day cities of Redondo Beach, Inglewood, Hawthorne, El Segundo, Lawndale, Manhattan Beach, and Hermosa Beach.

=== Ygnacio Machado – Rancho Aguaje de la Centinela ===
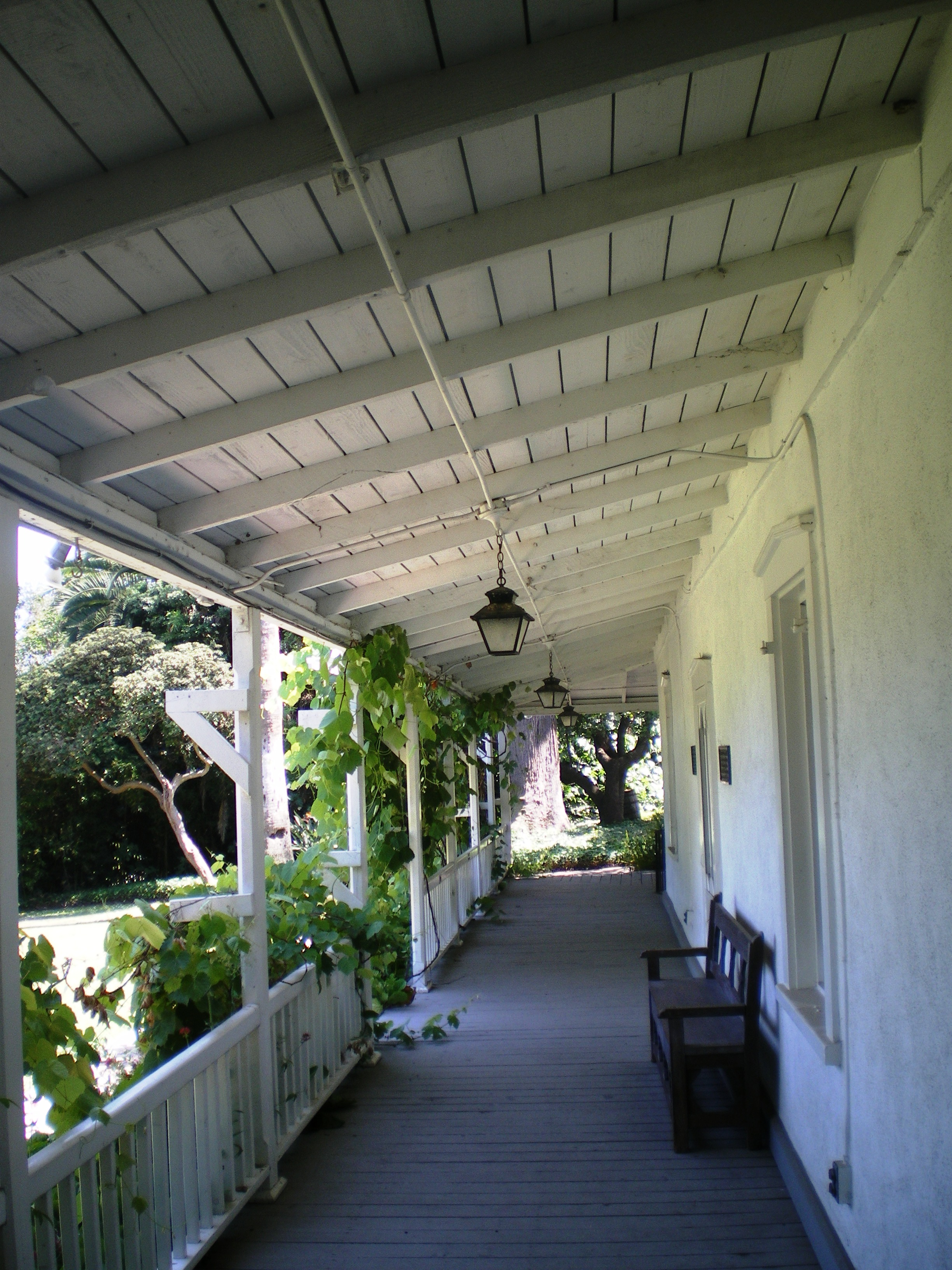
Front porch of the adobe

In the early 1830s, Ygnacio Machado, son of one of the "leather jacket soldiers" who escorted the original settlers of Los Angeles, began cultivating a portion of the rancho. Ygnacio Machado's brother Augustin Machado owned the nearby 14,000-acre (57 km^{2}) Rancho La Ballona, as well as the Rancho La Laguna and Rancho Santa Rosa. Ygnacio Machado became the grantee of a portion of Rancho Sausal Redondo, the 2,220 acres (9.0 km^{2}) Rancho Aguaje de la Centinela and built the 'Centinela Adobe' in 1834 "of adobe brick upon foundation of field stones. Subsequent additions were built of wood frame with vertical wood sheathing…the original roof has been replaced with wood shingles." Ygnacio Machado owned Rancho Aguaje de la Centinela only briefly, trading it in 1844 for a keg of whiskey and a small home in the Pueblo de Los Angeles.

=== Robert Burnett ===
The rancho changed hands several times in the 1850s, including a sale in 1859 for $930. Joseph Lancaster Brent bought the rancho the same year for $3,000, but when the American Civil War commenced in 1860, Brent returned to his home in the Southern states, where he served in the Confederate Army. Scotsman Robert Burnett purchased the rancho from Brent for $3,000 in 1860. Burnett added to the ranch, acquiring old Rancho Sausal Redondo for $29,500. By 1872, Burnett had a 25,000-acre (100 km^{2}) ranch that encompassed all of the land from what is now known as Playa del Rey to Lawndale and Redondo Beach.

=== Daniel Freeman ===
In 1873, Burnett returned to Scotland, leasing the ranch to Daniel Freeman, a recent arrival from Simcoe, Ontario, Canada. Writer Charles Nordoff stayed at the ranch in 1874 and wrote an article about Southern California ranch life for Harper's The New Monthly Magazine saying: "I looked around with some curiosity for this was the first time I had had an opportunity to see how the old Californians of wealth live." Nordoff found the adobe style of living "poor and simple" with a mix of "squalor and splendor."

Freeman paid $7,500 per year in rent, and also had an option to purchase the ranch for $150,000. Freeman raised sheep and planted more than 10,000 trees, including 7,000 orange and 2,000 almond trees on the ranch. When a drought led to the death of 22,000 head of his sheep, Freeman turned to growing barley, and he eventually was producing a million barrels a year. In 1885, Freeman exercised the option to buy the ranch for $140,000 in gold. Freeman amassed a fortune farming barley, olives, lemons, limes, and almonds on the ranch and named his expansive land holding Inglewood, after his birthplace in Ontario. In 1887, the California Central Railway laid tracks to Redondo Beach, and Freeman sold off 11,000 acres (45 km^{2}) in small parcels as a settlement that became the city of Inglewood. In 1888, Freeman built a large mansion in Inglewood, and in 1889, he built the land office that now sits on the grounds of the Centinela Adobe. Eventually, all 25,000 acres (100 km^{2}) of the ranch were subdivided, and the only remaining portion of the ranch that remains is the 1-acre (4,000 m^{2}) site on which the Centinela Adobe is situated.

== Centinela Adobe Museum ==
The Centinela ranch house, at 7634 Midfield Avenue, is one of the most beautifully preserved of the smaller adobes of Los Angeles County. Its simple lines, vine-clad corredores, and deeply recessed windows have remained unmarred by modern "improvements."

— Historic Spots in California (1966)

=== Adobe saved from demolition ===
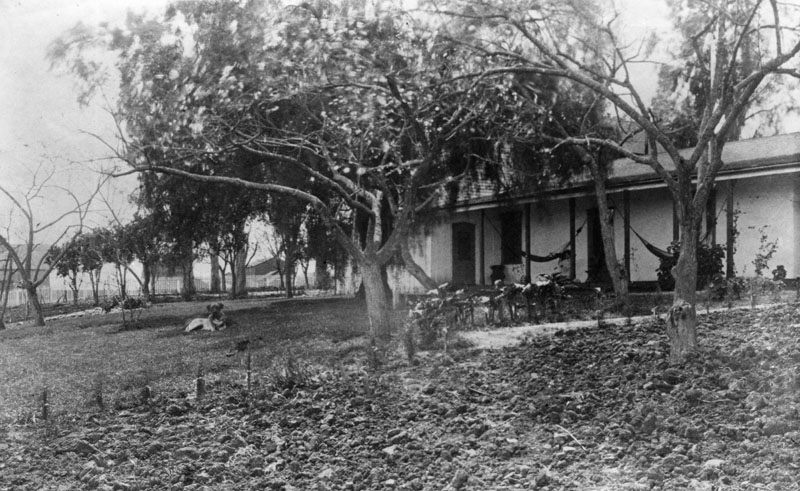
The Centinela Adobe in 1889.

The Centinela Adobe Complex has been described as the historical centerpiece of the area known as Centinela Valley, the lands extending from the Baldwin Hills to Palos Verdes, which comprised the Centinela Ranch. Yet, in the late 1940s, the adobe was threatened with demolition when the remaining land was subdivided to make room for new homes. Preservation-minded citizens raised money to purchase the property in 1950 and deeded it to City of Inglewood, which still maintains the adobe through the Parks and Recreation Department.

The Centinela Adobe Complex, and Freeman's land office that was moved to the grounds, are available for docent-led tours

=== Adobe museum ===
The adobe has been restored and is operated jointly by the Historical Society of the Centinela Valley and the Inglewood Department of Parks and Recreation. The adobe and museum are located at 7634 Midfield Ave., a residential street abutting the 405 Freeway. It is open on Sundays from 2 to 4 p.m. Admission is free, and docents are available to provide tours. The adobe can be toured for groups or special occasions at other times by calling the Historical Society. The adobe is furnished with period furniture and artifacts from the late 19th century. In a 2001 profile of the museum in 2001, the Los Angeles Times wrote:

"The long, low, white stucco adobe with its porch and shingle roof looks as if it is sitting right in the middle of the 19th Century. But it's not, as the nearby San Diego Freeway visibly demonstrates. It's really a kind of time warp: the telltale sign of a modern metropolis on one side and the oldest home in the Centinela Valley on the other-still serene, still peaceful amid lawns, shrubs and shade trees."

=== Freeman Land Office ===
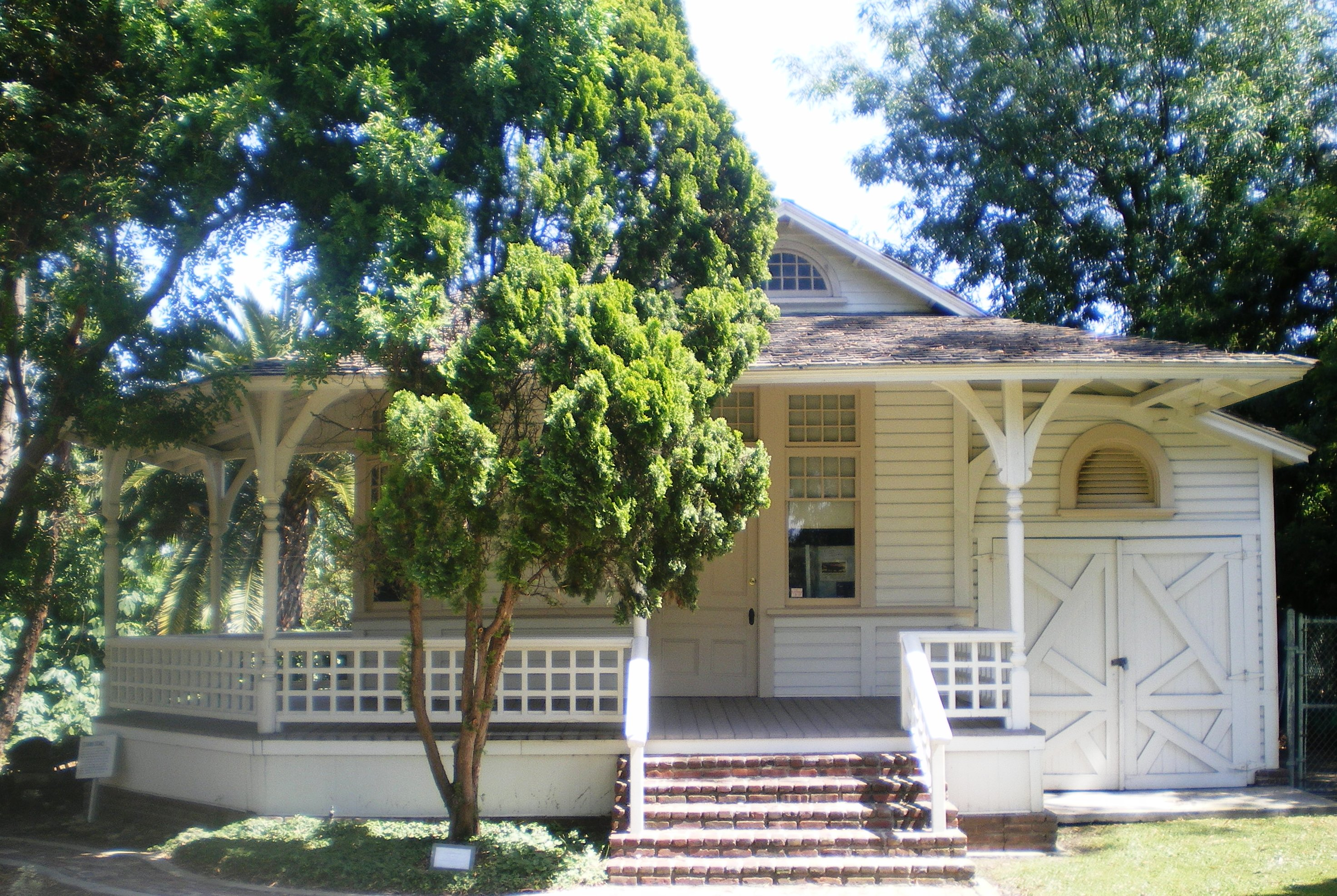
Daniel Freeman's land office

The Freeman Land Office, built in 1887 for the Centinela-Inglewood Land Company and originally located on Florence Avenue east of Eucalyptus Avenue, is also accessible as part of the tours. The building was used to sell plots of land for what became Inglewood. The building has been moved twice, most recently in 1975 to its present site next to the adobe. The land office building is well preserved and contains many artifacts and photographs.

=== Heritage and research center ===
The grounds also include a heritage and research center which opened in 1980. The research center houses items from the Daniel Freeman mansion, which was demolished in 1972. Items on display in the research center include Freeman's library, safe, and furniture, as well as articles and photos about the history of Centinela Valley.

== See also ==
- History of Inglewood, California
- List of Los Angeles Historic-Cultural Monuments on the Westside
- List of Registered Historic Places in Los Angeles – National Register of Historic Places
- List of Ranchos of California — Ranchos of California
- Rancho Aguaje de la Centinela
- Centinela Springs
