= Mississippi Rifles (Mexican–American War) =

American volunteer military unit

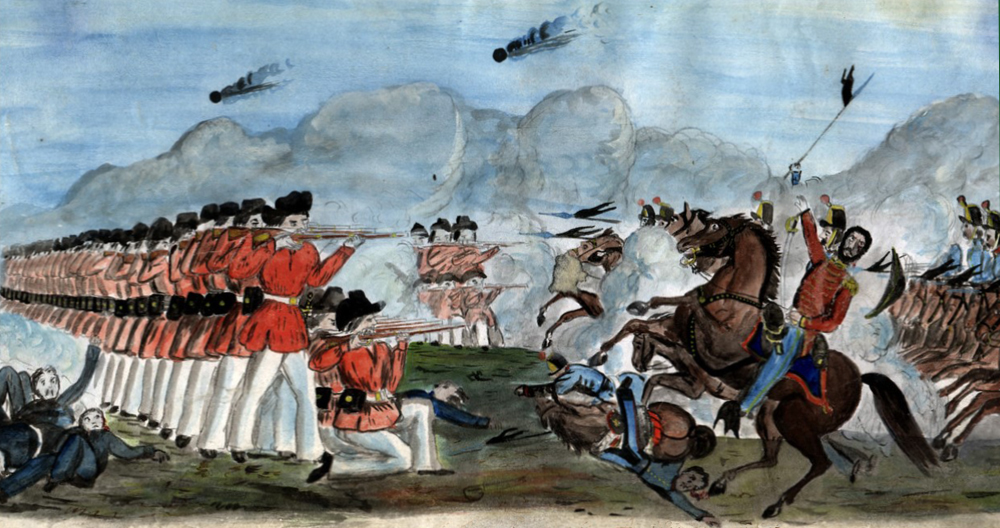
The Defeat of the Mexican Lancers by the Mississippi Rifles by Samuel Chamberlain (watercolor painted c. 1860)

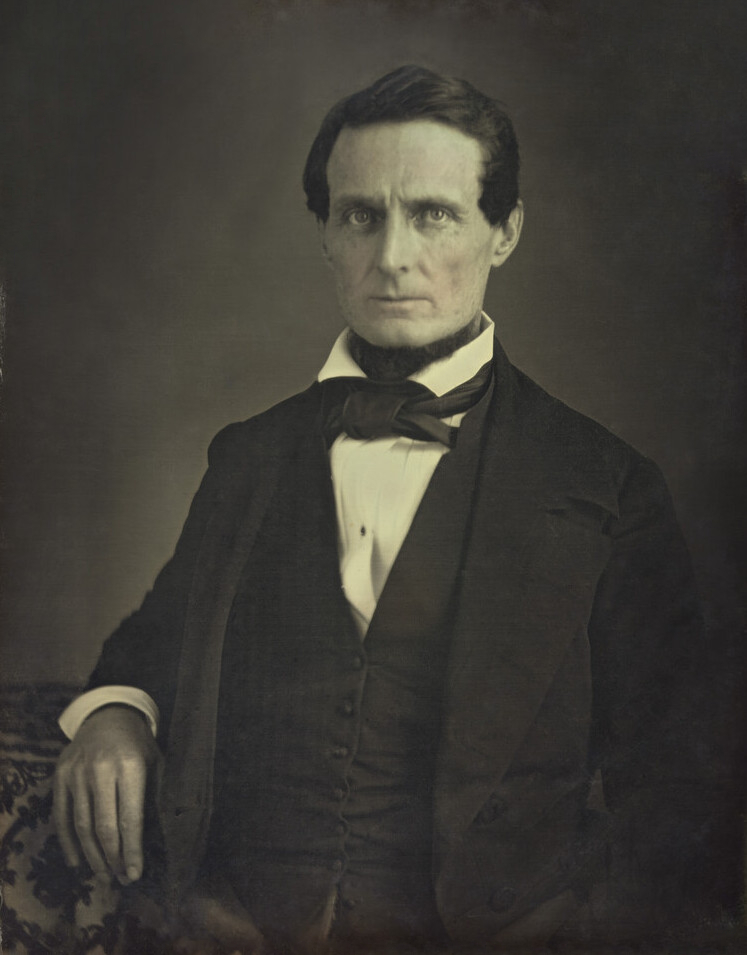
Jefferson Davis, c. 1847

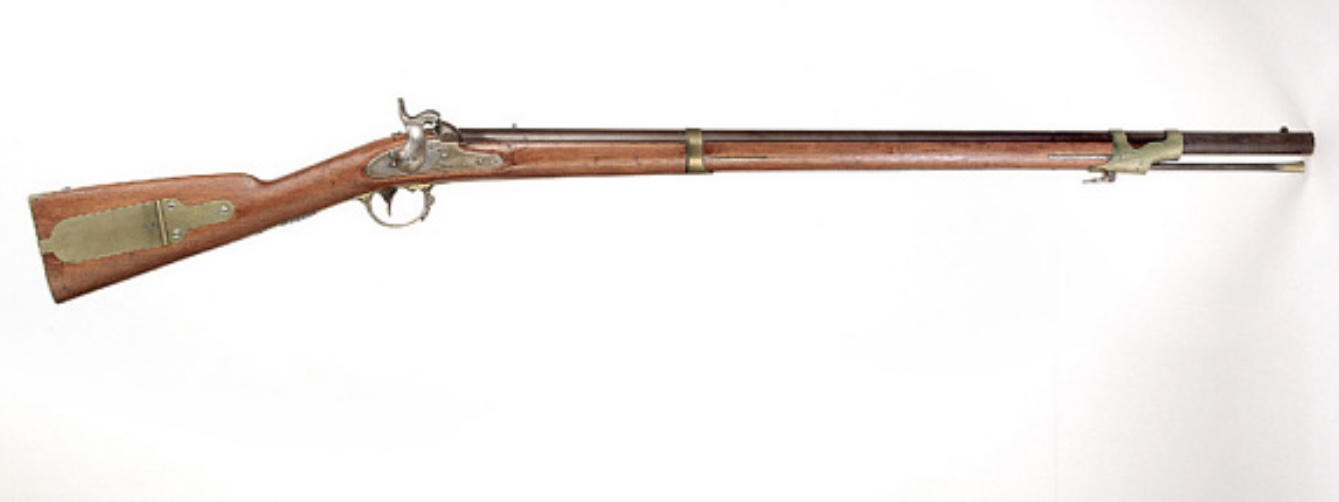
Example of a .54-caliber, muzzle-loading, percussion-fire 1841 Mississippi rifle, as manufactured by Eli Whitney in 1849 (U.S. Military Service Institute via Smithsonian Online)

There were three distinct groups known as Mississippi Rifles that responded to governor Albert Gallatin Brown's call for volunteers to supplement the forces of the regular United States Army during the Mexican–American War.

- The 1st Mississippi Rifles, led by future U.S. Senator and CSA president Jefferson Davis, had a famous victory at the Battle of Buena Vista.
- The 2nd Mississippi Rifles, commanded by Colonels Reuben Davis and Charles Clark, had a tragicomic war experience. The unit was beset by a horrific smallpox outbreak that killed scores; even the ones who were not killed outright suffered horribly just the same (the camp doctor reported pustules infested with maggots). The remainder of their service was both intensely boring and chaotic, the chaos being fueled by the battalion's poor training, deficient leadership, and the youthful exuberance of the soldiery. (Note: In regard to the general disorder of the 2nd Mississippi Rifles, the phrase "Privates Ratliffle, Simpson, Shields, and Mann have permission to visit the rancho to buy some cunt" appears in a recent academic history of the unit, and William Faulkner's great-grandfather William Clark Falkner was shot while allegedly on a trip to visit the ladies. Later, back in Mississippi, Falkner Bowie-knifed to death a fellow veteran of the Mississippi Rifles, the brother of the man who made the allegation, Thomas C. Hindman (also a Rifles vet and future Confederate-American).)
- Anderson's Rifles, also known as the Mississippi Battalion, could fairly be called the third string of the Mississippi Rifles in the Mexican–American War. They make almost no appearances in the military and cultural histories of the conflict; they were briefly on garrison duty in Tampico.

== 1st Regiment ==
The original 10 companies of the 1st Mississippi Rifles, as originally mustered:

- Company A: Yazoo Rifles - Capt. John M. Sharp
- Company B: Wilkinson Volunteers - Capt. Douglas H. Cooper
- Company C: Vicksburg Southrons - Capt. John Willis
- Company D: Carroll County Volunteers - Capt. Bainbridge D. Howard
- Company E: State Fencibles - Capt. John L. McManus
- Company F: Lafayette Volunteers - Capt. William Delay
- Company G: Raymond Fencibles - Capt. Reuben Downing
- Company H: Vicksburg Volunteers - Capt. George Crump
- Company I: Marshall Guards - Capt. James H. R. Taylor
- Company K: Tombigbee Volunteers - Capt. Alexander K. McClung

== 2nd Regiment & Anderson's Rifles ==
According to the Mississippi Encyclopedia, "The 2nd Mississippi Rifles and Anderson's Battalion of Mississippi Rifles were raised as the result of later federal calls for troops. Neither unit participated in major combat operations..." In regard to the latter group, a biography of the group's commander, another future Confederate named J. Patton Anderson, states "In answer to the governor's call, Anderson organized a company of volunteers from the regiment of Mississippi militia in DeSoto County. He was elected captain. There is little information in records or newspapers regarding this battalion..." According to a newspaper account of October 20, 1847, "A battalion of five companies of riflemen from Mississippi, called out in July, has not yet been organized. It is supposed that it will be raised, and its strength may be estimated at 400." Anderson contracted malaria during his Mexican War service, and it caused him continuing health problems for the remainder of his life.

== See also ==
- List of United States military and volunteer units in the Mexican–American War
- 155th Infantry Regiment (United States)
- Hilliard P. Dorsey
- John N. Forrest, brother of Nathan Bedford Forrest and veteran of Anderson's Rifles

== Sources ==
- Raab, James W. (2004). J. Patton Anderson, Confederate General: A Biography. Jefferson, N.C.: McFarland & Co. ISBN 9780786489268. OCLC 607379378.
- Winders, Richard Bruce (2016). Panting for Glory: The Mississippi Rifles in the Mexican War. No. 151 Williams-Ford Military History Series. College Station, Texas: Texas A&M University Press. ISBN 9781623494179. LCCN 2016004930. Project MUSE book 46192.
