= Daniel Freeman (Los Angeles County) =

American founder of Inglewood, California

Daniel Freeman (1837–1918) was an American landowner in southwestern Los Angeles County, California, and a developer in downtown Los Angeles during the 19th century. He was the founder of the City of Inglewood and the first farmer to engage extensively in wheat cultivation in Southern California.

Freeman

== Life ==
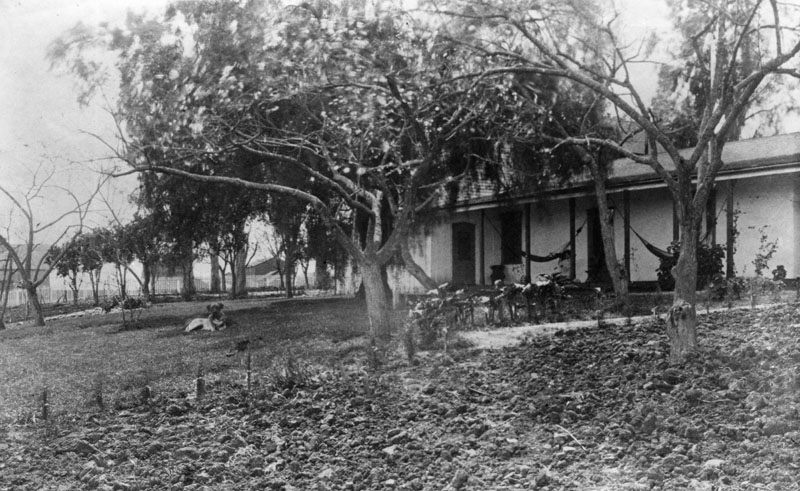
Freeman adobe home in 1890

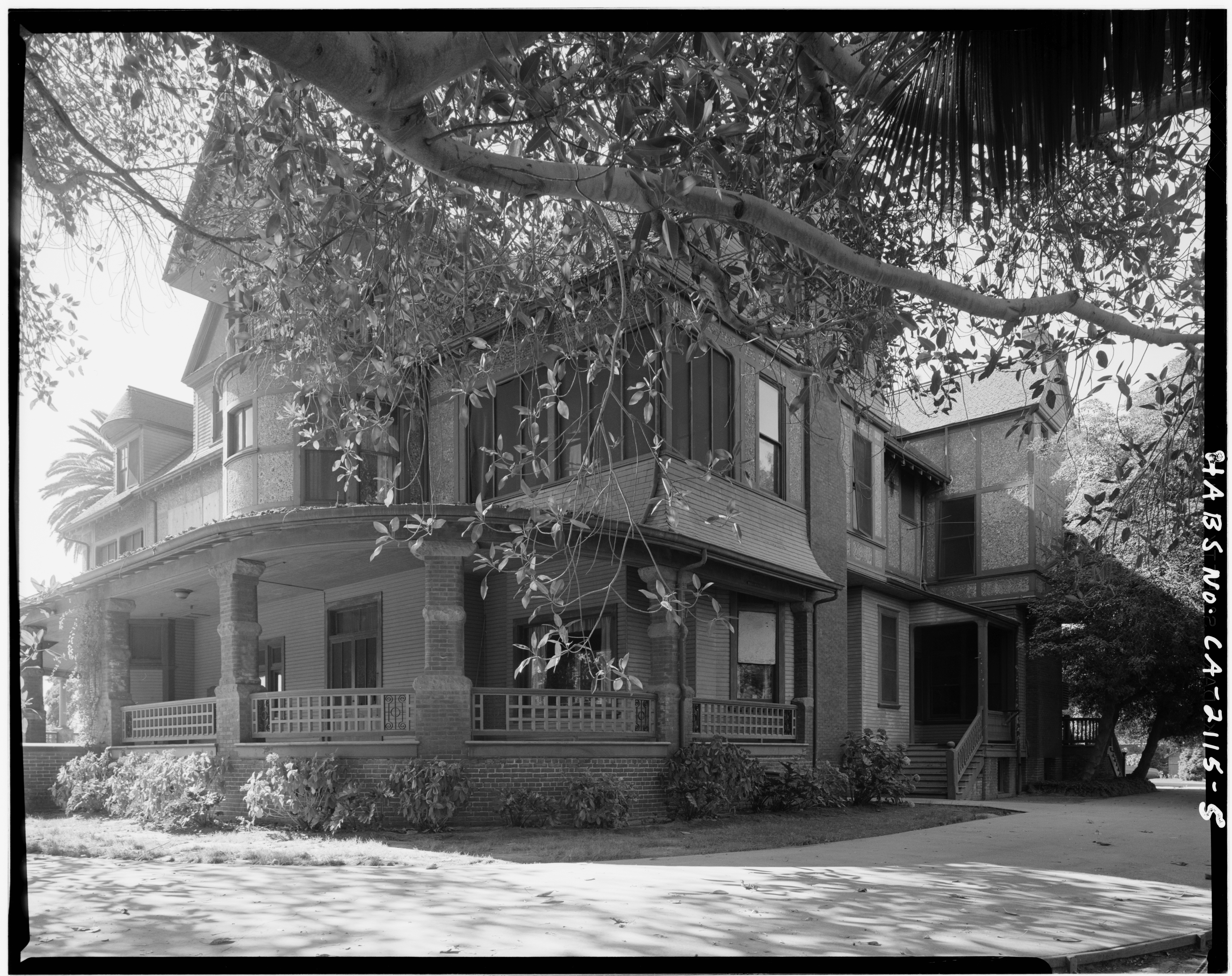
Freeman house on Inglewood Avenue

Freeman was born in Norfolk County, Upper Canada, on June 30, 1837, the son of Daniel Wesley Freeman (1807–1877) and Isabella Bailey (1811–1856). He had a brother, Charles Edwin Freeman, and a sister, Phoebe Amelia Freeman. He attended the common schools in Norfolk County and then went to Lynn Grove Academy until 1857. He earned his law degree from Osgoode Hall, University of Toronto in 1864.

Freeman married to Catherine Grace Christie Higginson on July 13, 1866, in Vienna, Province of Canada, and they moved to San Francisco in 1873 and later to Los Angeles County. There were three children, Archibald Christie (1867), Charles (1868) and Grace E. (1870). His wife predeceased him.

For many years, the family lived in a small house on his property that later became known as the Centinela Adobe and is now on the National Register of Historic Places. In 1891, he built a large residence in Inglewood that later became a local historic site but was torn down in 1972 because there were no funds for upkeep or prospective buyers, and the site was needed by Daniel Freeman Memorial Hospital for its own use.

An Episcopalian and a Republican, he was an organizer and the first president of the California Club of Los Angeles, as well as president of the Los Angeles Chamber of Commerce in 1893 to 1894. He was a life member of the British Benevolent Society.

Freeman died of "an attack of heart failure" on September 28, 1918, at the age of 81 in his home on Inglewood Avenue in Inglewood, California. A "strictly private" and "unusually simple" service was held in the home of C.F. Howland, his son-in-law, followed by another service at the Inglewood Episcopal Church and cremation at Rosedale Cemetery in Los Angeles. Notable honorary pallbearers included newspaper editor and writer Charles F. Lummis and attorney Henry O'Melveny.

Freeman was survived by two children, Grace Howland, wife of C.H. Howland of Inglewood, and A.C. Freeman, who was living in Paris, France. In a hand-written will of fourteen pages, Freeman bequeathed the bulk of his estate, valued between $800,000 and $1 million, to Alice Cruz Freeman, a granddaughter living in San Francisco. He left $50,000 to the University of Southern California, certain bequests to other relatives and the remainder, estimated to exceed $100,000, to his daughter, Grace. The will stated that Freeman had in 1897 already given to his son "a very valuable tract of land... as his full share and portion of my estate and of the estate of his deceased mother, Catherine Grace Higginson Freeman" and that other "large sums of money" had been conveyed to the son.

== Vocation ==
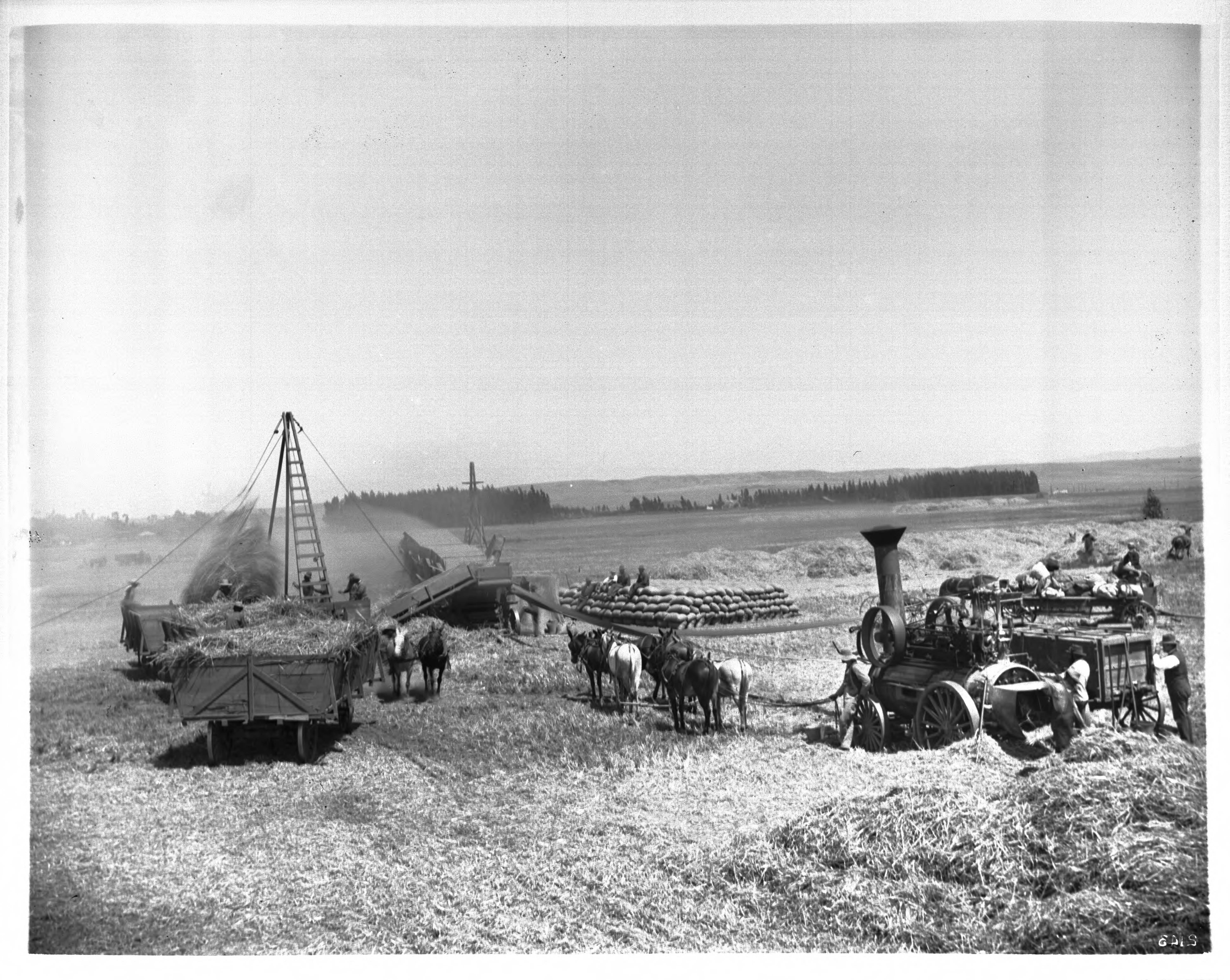
Threshing on the Freeman property about 1900

Freeman taught school in 1857 to 1858, studied law in 1859 to 1864, and practiced law in 1864 to 1873, when he moved to the United States and took up farming. He styled himself a "farmer" or a "rancher." Freeman's first agricultural pursuit was the purchase of the 25,000-acre Centinela-Sausal Redondo Rancho from Robert Burnett, a Scotsman who had to return to his home country after the death of his elder brother to take up duties of his family estate there. The rancho included the area on which the communities of El Segundo, Playa del Rey, Manhattan Beach, and Hermosa Beach were later established.

The rancho was at first given over to sheep farming, but Freeman soon became "the first man in Southern California to engage in the extensive planting of wheat." He sold off his rancho properties and invested elsewhere, including the 1889 construction of a "substantial" three-story bring building at Sixth and Spring Streets, Los Angeles, known as the Freeman block and housing the Los Angeles Trust and Savings Bank. It was known as the "pioneer of large buildings on Spring street."

He was an investor in the Panorama Building, a commercial building and separate exhibition space for a panoramic painting, debuting in late 1887: a copy of the Panorama of the Siege of Paris by Henri Felix Emmanuel Philippoteaux, depicting a battle of the 1870-1871 Franco-Prussian War, the last one between the French resistance and the Prussian besiegers, which led to the fall of Paris in January 1871. The exhibition rotunda became a skating rink and was demolished to make way for the Adolphus (later Hippodrome) Theatre. Today. the site is a large open-air parking lot.

In 1892, Freeman bought a steamer, the Southern California, and began importing coal from British Columbia. He next engaged in brick-making "and made the building materials for many of the business blocks on Spring street and on Broadway."

He was a director of the Southern California Railway Company.

== Toshio Aoki drawing ==
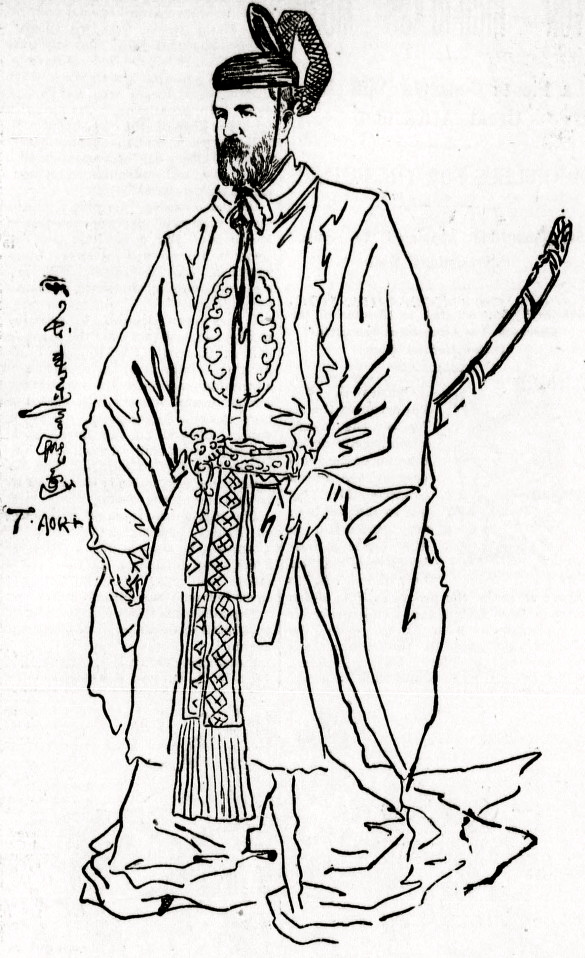
Drawing of Freeman by artist Toshio Aoki, 1895

Freeman was one of nine civic or social leaders who were sketched by Japanese-born artist Toshio Aoki when he visited Los Angeles from his San Francisco home in 1895. Of Freeman, Aoki said:

He is big man—big heart—big brain. So I make him big leader and give him the sword and the cap and the gown of one great Japanese man which has power over many and has large—you call it retinue, is it not?—of those which follow him in all things. You call him Duke of the Inglewood? Ah, that is good. He has much lands and property, you say? That is good; so much I see in his face and I know you tell truly.
