= Rancho La Ballona =

Mexican land grant California

Coordinates: 34.0100°N 118.420°W

- Ranchos of Alta California of Mexico
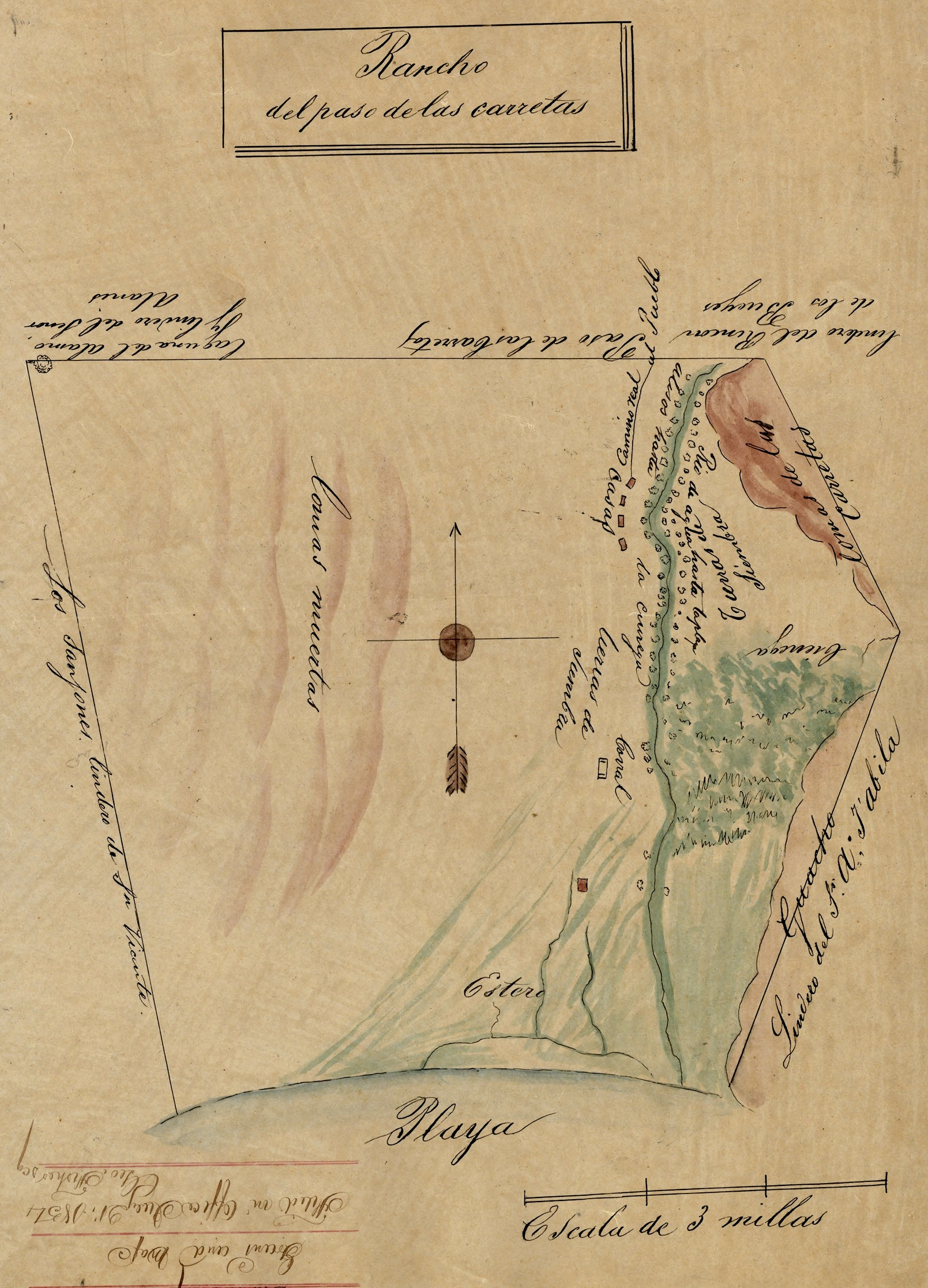
  - Type: Mexican-era land grant
- History
  - Established: 1839
- Today part of: United States

Rancho La Ballona was a 13,920-acre (56.3 km^{2}) Mexican land grant in the present-day Westside region of Los Angeles County, Southern California.

The rancho was confirmed by Alta California Governor Juan Alvarado in 1839, to Ygnacio and Augustin Machado and Felipe and Tomas Talamantes. The Machados and Talamanteses had already been given a Spanish concession to graze their cattle on this land in 1819. Many Machado and Talamantes family members of the late 19th century and early 20th century are buried at the north edge of the former Mexican Rancho La Ballona at a cemetery on Pico Boulevard, which was known as the La Ballona Cemetery, later in 1876 as the Ballona Township Cemetery, and then as the Woodlawn Cemetery of Santa Monica in the early 20th century.

The grant stretched from inland (near the present day San Diego Freeway) to Santa Monica Bay, from present day Mar Vista, Westside Village, Palms, and Culver City; northwest to Pico Boulevard and the Ocean Park district of Santa Monica; and south along Ballona Creek through Venice, the Ballona Wetlands, and present day Marina del Rey, Playa Vista, and Playa Del Rey. Neighboring ranches included Rancho San Vicente y Santa Monica, Rancho Rincón de los Bueyes, Rancho Aguaje de la Centinela, and Rancho Sausal Redondo.

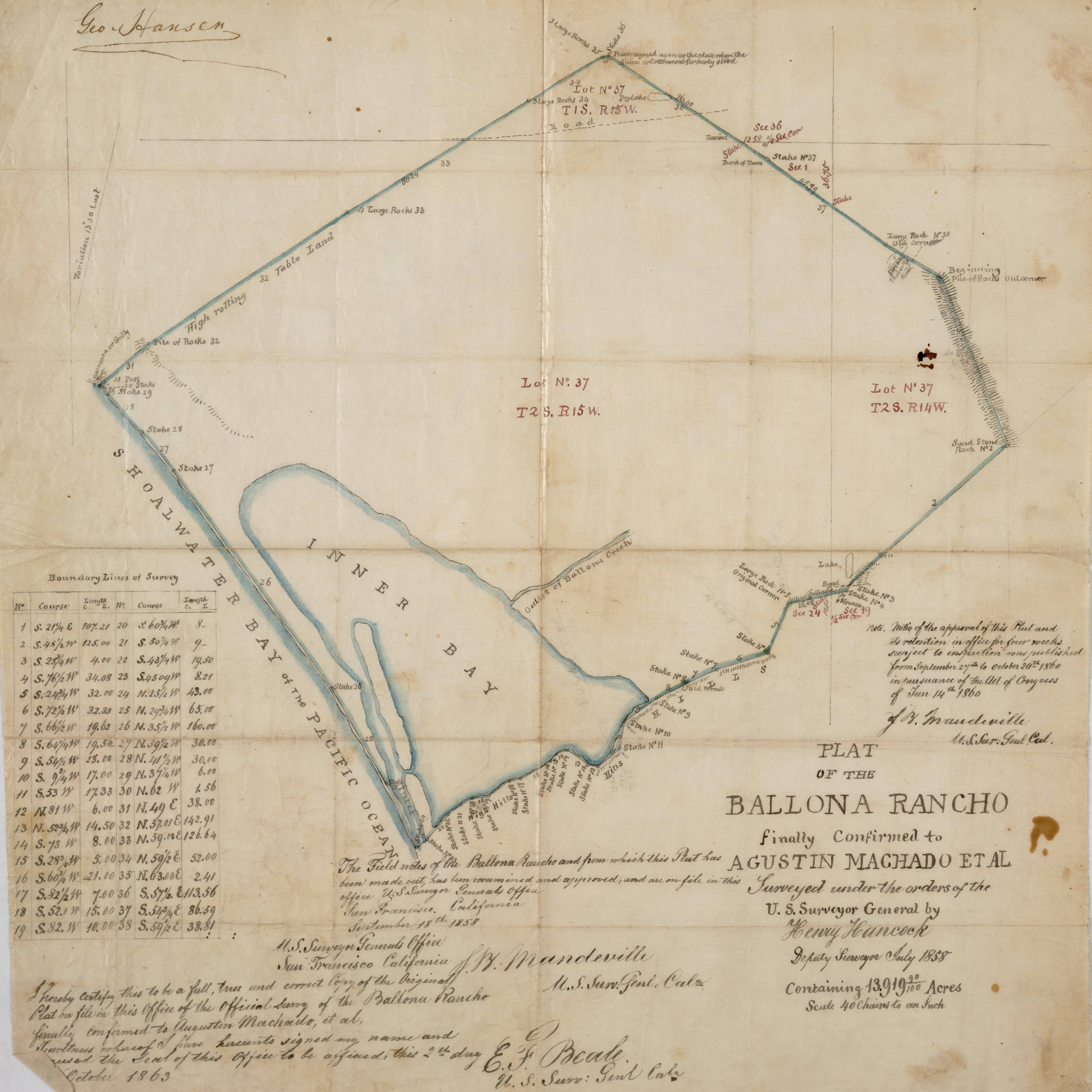
1858 survey

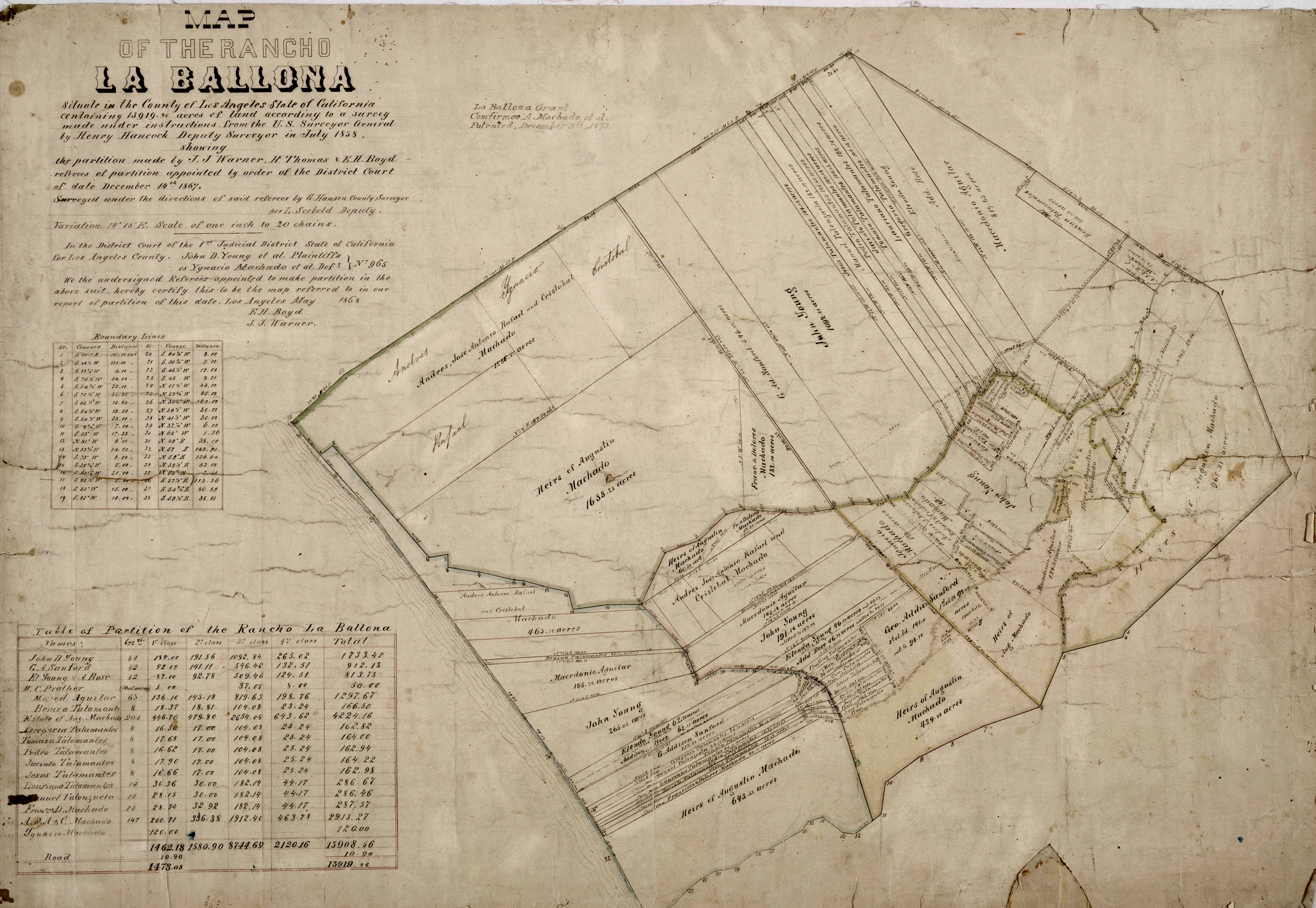
1868 survey

== History ==
In 1821 they applied again, joined by Augustin's brother Ygnacio, and Felipe's son Tomas. The military commander, José de la Guerra y Noriega, gave them permission to graze cattle on the future Rancho La Ballona lands, when they were living in the Pueblo de Los Ángeles. In 1839 Mexican Governor Alvarado confirmed the land grant for Rancho La Ballona to them.

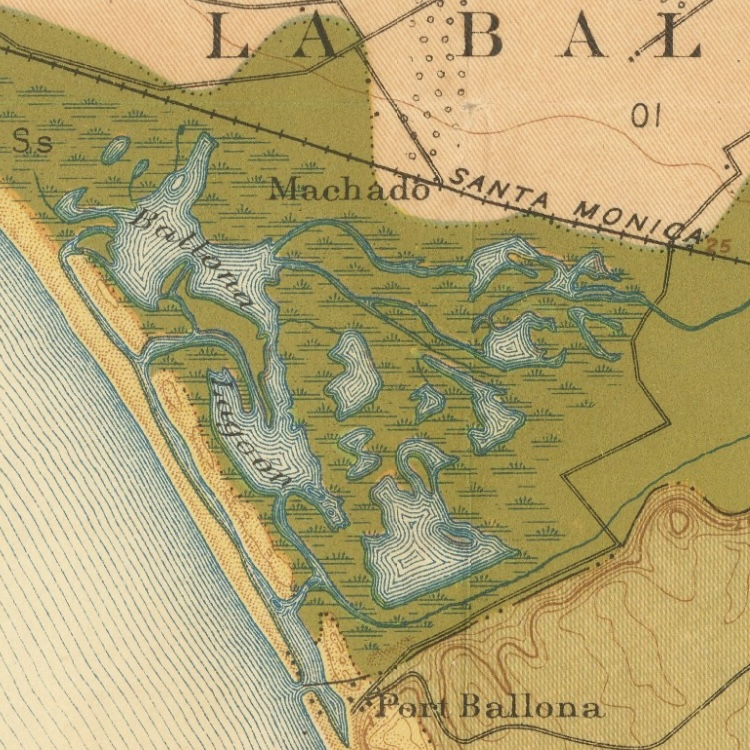
Excerpt from a 1903 map, showing the Machado rail stop, Port Ballona (shortly to become Playa Del Rey), and Ballona Wetlands

The cession of California to the United States followed the Mexican–American War, and the 1848 Treaty of Guadalupe Hidalgo promised that the existing land grants would be honored. In accordance with the Land Act of 1851, the Machados and Talamanteses registered their claim for Rancho La Ballona with the Board of California Land Commissioners, and it was approved in 1854. The US District Court upheld the decision on appeal in 1873, 8 years after Agustín Machado had died, and Rancho La Ballona was patented at 13,920 acres (56 km^{2}) to the original four claimants.

In 1857, Benjamin D. Wilson received title to one fourth of Rancho La Ballona on a foreclosure of a loan he had made to Tomas Talamantes in 1854. Wilson sold his portion of Rancho La Ballona to George A. Sanford and John D. Young, who in 1863 had petitioned for a division of the lower Ballona Valley land. A decree dividing it into 23 sections was issued in 1868. Each of the 23 long narrow parcels was to have three types of land: "pasture", "irrigable"; and "bay" (Santa Monica Bay). The largest allotment of the former rancho, on the bluff northwest of Ballona Valley to the boundary with Rancho San Vicente y Santa Monica, was to the "Estate of Augustin Machado", and by a later partition in 1875 this allotment was re-divided among the "Heirs of Augustin Machado".

In 1928, an “old-timer” told the Los Angeles Times that “The Rancho Rincon de Los Bueyes of 3,000 acres was owned by Don Francisco Higuera. Adjoining Rincon de Los Bueyes were the ranchos off Don Ignacio Machado, Andres Machado, Antonio Machado, Bernardino Machado, Macedonia Aguilar, Ellenda Young, and Cy Sandford, along what is now the Inglewood Road.”

=== Camp Latham ===
During the Civil War General George Wright ordered troops to secure Port Ballona against a possible seizure by pro-Confederates, and by 1862 6,000 Union troops were stationed Port Ballona. Their post was named Camp Latham, after Milton Latham.

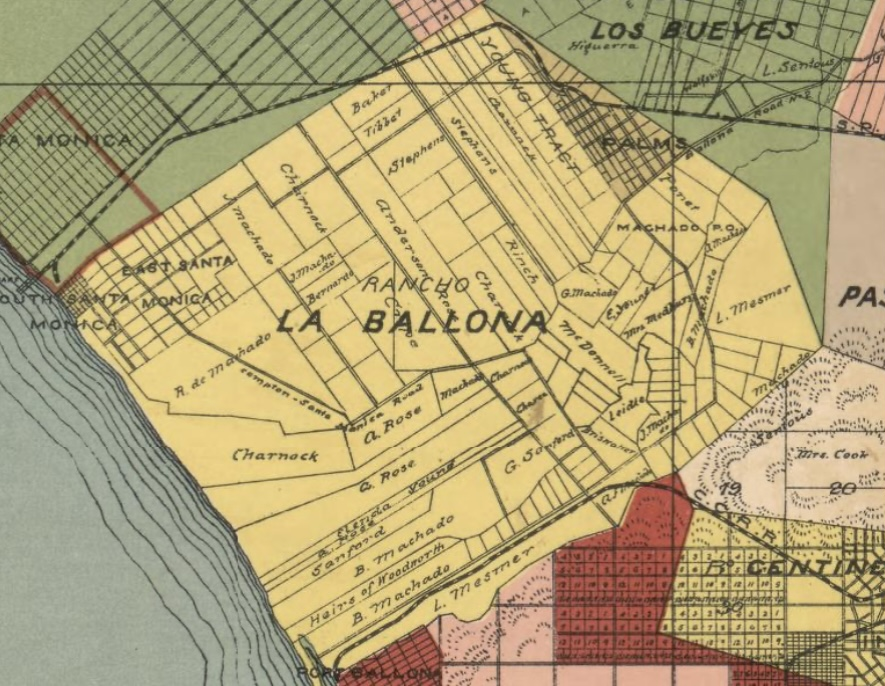
Rancho La Ballona in 1888, excerpted from Official map of Los Angeles County by V. J. Rowan

== Machado family ==
José Manuel Machado (1756–1810) married María de la Luz Valenzuela Y Avilas in 1780, and traveled in Rivera's 1781 expedition to Alta California. In 1797, Machado retired from military service and returned to the Pueblo de Los Angeles. Two of his sons, José Agustín Antonio Machado and José Ygnacio Antonio Machado, tried unsuccessfully for some time to get grazing rights on land near the pueblo.

=== Augustín Machado (1794–1865) ===
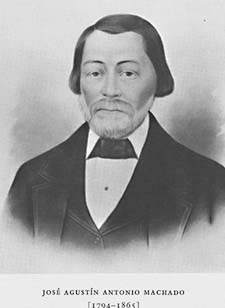
Augustin Machado

Agustín Machado married María Petra Buelna in 1824, but she died while giving birth to their first child, Juan Bautista (1826–1907). In 1827, Machado married Ramona Sepúlveda, the daughter of Francisco Sepulveda, and they had 14 children: María Josefa Delfina (1827–1828), Martina Magdalena (1829–1872), Vicenta Ferrer Machado (1831–1894), José Domingo (1833–1882), José Dolores Machado (1835–1906), María Ascencion Machado (1837–1912), Susana, José Francisco (1841–1888), Bernardino Machado (1843–1911), Candelaria Onofre Machado (1844–1907), José Ramón Tomás (1846–1847), Jose Juan Rafael Machado (1846–1930), Andres Manuel (1849–1929), and José de la Luz de los Reyes (1853–1923). Cattle and sheep rancher Juan Moreno sold the Rancho Santa Rosa to Augustin in 1855. Subsequently, Abel Stearns sold the nearby Rancho La Laguna to Augustin Machado in 1858. This later acquisition also was the site of one of the Butterfield Overland Mail stage stations until 1861.

- Francisco Machado, son of Agustín Machado, served as a Los Angeles County Supervisor for two terms. He assumed office in 1872 and was re-elected in 1874. Lake Machado in Harbor City was named in his honor.
- Vicenta Machado married Francisco Lugo. Francisco Lugo was the brother of José del Carmen Lugo.

=== Ygnacio Machado (1797–1878) ===
In 1826, Ygnacio Machado married Estefana Palomares they had 7 children: Luisa, Versabe, María, José, Andres, Francisco and Rafael. Ygnacio Machado was the grantee of Rancho Aguaje de la Centinela in 1837. In 1845, Machado traded the rancho to Bruno Avila, brother of Antonio Avila, for a small tract in the Pueblo of Los Angeles.

== Talamantes family ==
=== Felipe Talamantes (1771–1856) ===
Luis Felipe Talamantes was a retired soldier between 1783 and 1784 when he went with Juan Jose Dominguez to be Majordomo of the Rancho San Pedro. He went back to Baja, California to get married 1792. Felipe brought his wife Idlefonza Avila and son Tomas back to the Pueblo of Los Angeles in 1794. Felipe and Idlefonza's children were Tomas, Pablo Antonio, Maria de Los Angeles, Felipe, and Jose Nicodemus.

=== Tomás Talamantes (1792–1873) ===
Tomas Talamantes married Maria Petronila Olivas and had 8 children. He forfeited his one fourth interest in Rancho La Ballona for nonpayment of a loan in 1857.

== See also ==
- Ranchos of Los Angeles County
- Category:Ranchos of Los Angeles County, California
- Ranchos of California
- List of Ranchos of California

People

- Clarence E. Coe – landowner, lima bean farmer and pioneer

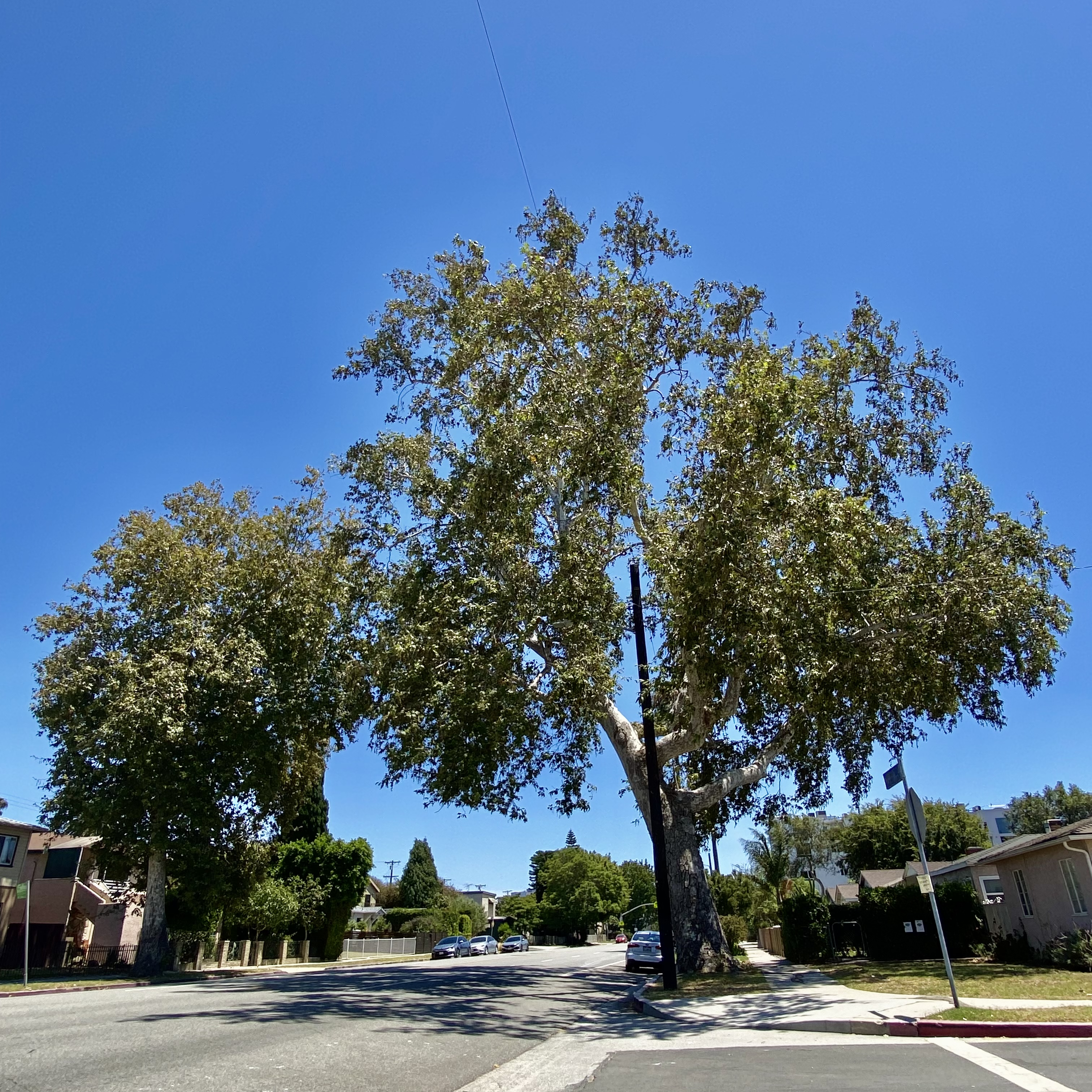
65-foot (20 m) tall, heavy-trunked native California sycamore (Platanus racemosa) on Inglewood Blvd, Del Rey, Los Angeles, six blocks from Ballona Creek
