= Rancho Sausal Redondo =

Mexican land grant in California

Coordinates: 33.900°N 118.360°W

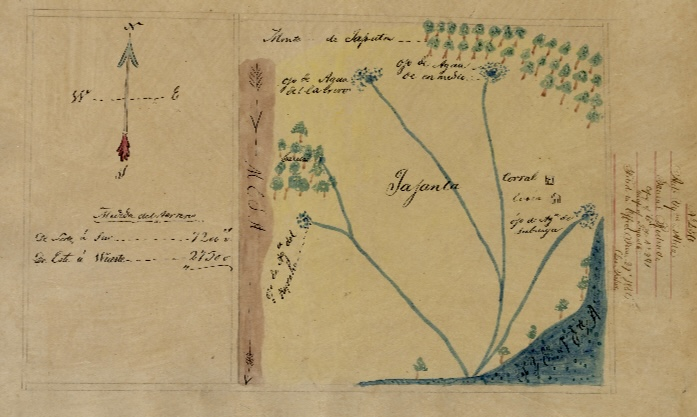
Rancho Sausal Redondo diseño (a watercolor map of land claims to be submitted to the U.S. government) showing the watershed

Rancho Sausal Redondo (Round Willow-grove Ranch) was a 22,458-acre (91 km^{2}) Mexican land grant in present day Los Angeles County, California, given in 1837 to Antonio Ygnacio Ávila by Juan Alvarado Governor of Alta California. Rancho Sausal Redondo covered the area that now includes Playa Del Rey, El Segundo, Manhattan Beach, Lawndale, Hermosa Beach, Inglewood, Hawthorne, and Redondo Beach.

== History ==
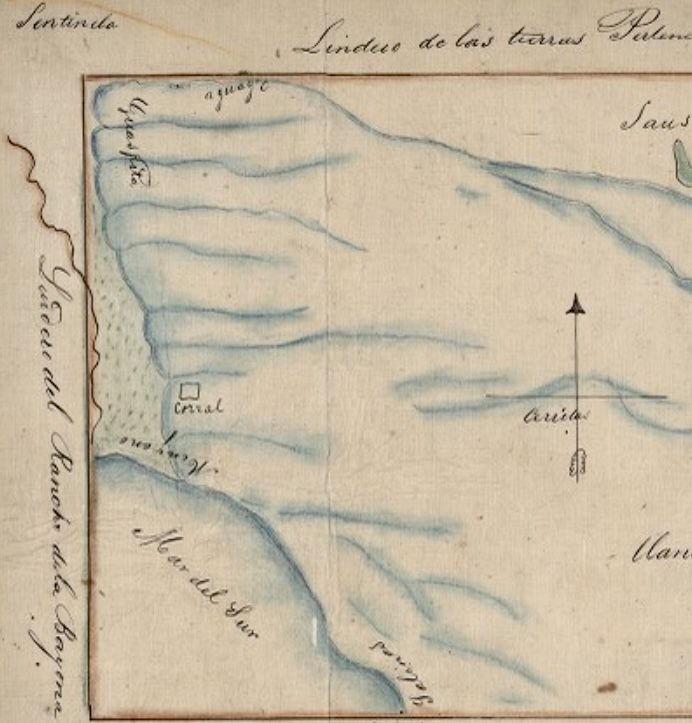
UC Berkeley's Bancroft Library holds a copy of a Rancho Sausal Redondo diseño that shows the predecessor grant Rancho Gauspita was to the north, above the Bayona on the way to Sentinela, and predecessor grant Rancho Salinas was to the south (roughly at Hermosa Beach) close to the Old Salt Lake

Antonio Ygnacio Ávila (1781–1858), a member of the Ávila family of California, married Rosa Maria Ruiz (1789–1866) in 1804.

In 1822, Antonio Ygnacio Ávila was granted a permit from the new Mexican government to utilize grazing land totaling approximately 25,000 acres on what was to become Rancho Sausal Redondo. Ávila received a land grant of Rancho Sausal Redondo for most of this land from Governor Juan Alverado on May 20, 1837.

With the cession of California to the United States following the Mexican–American War, the 1848 Treaty of Guadalupe Hidalgo provided that the land grants would be honored. As required by the Land Act of 1851, a claim for Rancho Sausal Redondo was filed with the Public Land Commission in 1852, and the grant was patented to Antonio Ygnacio Ávila in 1855.

Antonio Ygnacio Ávila died in 1858, and in 1868 Ávila's heirs were forced to sell the rancho to pay the probate costs. The Rancho was sold to Sir Robert Burnett (11th. Baronet, 1876–1894) who used the land for sheep and cattle raising. Having previously acquired Rancho Aguaje de la Centinela, Burnett combined the total area into the Centinela Ranch, thus reuniting the major area of the original land grant. Clear title to the land did not occur until 1873, when a U.S. District Court upheld Burnett's purchase against a suit filed by Ávila heir Tomas Avila Sanchez.

In 1873, Robert Burnett leased the land to Daniel Freeman and returned to his native Scotland. Freeman moved to the ranch with his family, increased the stock, and planted citrus trees. When the 1875 drought ruined the livestock industry, Freeman turned to dry farming. In 1885, Freeman purchased the remainder of Rancho Sausal Redondo. Daniel Freeman was the last person to own all of Rancho Sausal Redondo.

== Historic sites of the Rancho ==
- Centinela Adobe – Burnett's adobe ranch house in Inglewood.

== See also ==
- Ranchos of California
- List of Ranchos of California
- List of rancho land grants in Los Angeles County, California
