= Historic Spots in California =

Reference book

Historic Spots in California is a guide to historic places in the U.S. state of California. The first edition, by Hero Eugene Rensch and Ethel Grace Rensch, was published in 1932. The book was originally sponsored by the Daughters of the American Revolution and is published by Stanford University Press. One of the original authors was a sister-in-law of U.S. president Herbert Hoover.

== Reception ==
There have been five editions since the title was first published in 1932. In a 2005 review, Daniel B. Rosen of Merritt College described the book's fifth edition as "the definitive guide to historic sites in California." A 1948 review of a similar book stated that it would make a good companion to Historic Spots "of which too high praise cannot be made." Another historian called it "invaluable."

== Editions ==
- Historic Spots in California: The Southern Counties (1932) by Hero Eugene Rensch and Ethel Grace Rensch - introduction by Robert Glass Cleland - Imperial, Inyo, Los Angeles, Mono, Orange, Riverside, San Bernardino, San Diego, Santa Barbara, Ventura
- Historic Spots in California: Valley and Sierra Counties by Hero Eugene Rensch and Ethel Grace Rensch and Mildred Brooke Hoover
- Historic Spots in California: Counties of the Coast Range (1937) by Mildred Brooke Hoover
- Historic Spots in California, 2nd ed (1948)
- Historic Spots in California, 3rd ed (1966), text revised by William N. Abeloe
- Historic Spots in California, 4th ed (1990), text revised by Douglas E. Kyle
- Historic Spots in California, 5th ed (2005), text revised by Douglas E. Kyle
