= Good Shepherd Lutheran School =

Location
- Inglewood, California; United States; 33°57′08″N 118°21′15″W

Information
- Type: Parochial school
- Religious affiliation: Lutheran Church–Missouri Synod
- Established: 1936
- Status: Closed
- Closed: 2003
- Grades: K-8
- Colors: Green and Gold
- Mascot: Bighorns

Good Shepherd Lutheran School was a parochial school in Inglewood, California, affiliated with the Lutheran Church–Missouri Synod (LCMS), Pacific Southwest District (LCMS). The school opened on February 10, 1936, and closed on June 12, 2003. It had a history of 67 years as an institution.

== History ==
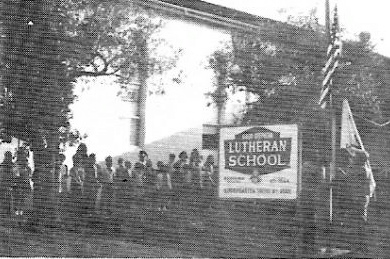
Midweek Chapel Day flag-raising, Parish Hall, 1969

"The Good Shepherd" is a metaphor which refers to Jesus as the shepherd who laid down His life to save His flock. Good Shepherd School was founded as a mission institution of Good Shepherd Lutheran Church in the middle of the 1935-1936 academic year. Classes were held in a house on Spruce Street which doubled as the church sanctuary. Walter A. Uffelman (1912–1982), a 24-year-old LCMS schoolteacher, was called to serve as the school's first principal. He came from his native Nebraska by rail to Los Angeles County to assume his new position, accompanied by his wife, Luella (1913–1999), who served later as the kindergarten teacher of long standing as the school's size expanded. The initial enrollment of pupils in the school, coming in the middle of the academic year, amounted to just nine children; and Uffelman doubled as their teacher. Uffelman was both the first and longest-serving principal of Good Shepherd School, working as the administrator for 41 years until he reached retirement age in 1977.

As the school and church grew, in 1941 both institutions were able to move to a new property at the corner of Grevillea Avenue and Arbor Vitae Street in Inglewood. The new building complex, actually consisting of two separate structures, was called the Parish Hall. Worship services of the church were conducted in the auditorium portion of the Parish Hall. Once the school expanded to the point that each grade could be organized as a separate, individual class rather than be combined, kindergarten, first, and second grades met in classrooms in the separate and smaller school building on the south end of campus. Within the main Parish Hall itself, third, fourth, seventh, and eighth grades met in the south wing of this building. Sixth grade met in a classroom in the center portion of the building which attached both the north and the south wings. Fifth grade met in an upstairs classroom above the Parish Hall's Sunday worship sanctuary. The playground and open space of the school was on the east end of the campus, facing Maple Street.

In February 1959, Good Shepherd Church opened a new worship sanctuary (although nearly all construction was done in 1958) on Maple Street. The Parish Hall continued to serve as the school building for 11 years longer, with Sunday School classes in the former worship sanctuary. Good Shepherd Church reached its largest size in 1967, with a roster of 1,900 members.

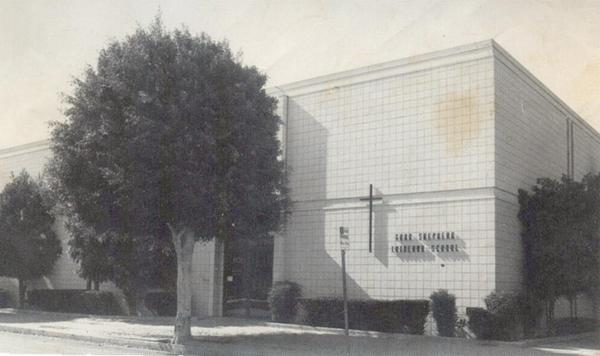
ERA Building

The school's enrollment also gradually expanded. Because of the church's large size at the time and the problem of airplane noise from nearby Los Angeles International Airport ever increasing, the church elected to build a new school building at the end of the 1960s. In fact, "aircraft-produced noise levels exceeded those considered healthy." The calendar goal for the completion of construction was 1969, but a number of labor strikes forced the deferral of its opening until 1970. The new school site was known as the ERA Building, ("Education/Recreation/Administration") facing Maple Street. The Parish Hall was sold to another church in Inglewood and was moved in 1970; the rest of the buildings were torn down. The south wing of the old Parish Hall had actually weathered a minor fire to a few roof shingles in 1969, when embers flew over from a garage fire on Walnut Street. The playground area was now located on the south and west sides of the campus.

=== Integration ===
The 1970s witnessed two major changes to the collective makeup of the student body. The first was racial integration. Good Shepherd School never practiced segregated admissions at any time, although its enrollment always reflected the prevailing demographic patterns in the City of Inglewood. Local historian Gladys Waddingham wrote, "No blacks had ever lived in Inglewood," but by 1960, "they lived in great numbers along its eastern borders." Thus student enrollment from the school's opening until 1971 was predominantly of the Caucasian race. The years of substantial integration took place from 1971 to 1978, with the school obtaining a predominantly African American student enrollment by the latter year; this remained the basic demographic makeup of the school until its closing. Although Latinos assumed an increasing share of the residents of western Inglewood during the school's last years, this was barely reflected in the student body, with Latino student enrollment rising from about two to six students during the 1990-2003 period. In 2001, the "Hispanic population has been the fastest growing group in the City." Concurrently with this development, Good Shepherd School changed from having an enrollment in which 95 percent of the students were from church member families to a non-member family student majority by 1978. The trend towards an increase in non-member families lasted much longer than the integration phase; and the percentage share of non-member students grew steadily during the school's final quarter century. Thus Good Shepherd School as a mission institution of Good Shepherd Church additionally became an outreach mission to a majority of its families who attended church elsewhere.

=== Golden years ===
The school itself reached the apex of its enrollment during the 1972-1973 school year, when 270 pupils were enrolled. This figure tapered off for the next several years, but achieved a new stabilization of approximately 225 students which endured until the mid-1990s. As an increasing number of American mothers worked at paid occupations outside the home during the 1970s, the school founded an Extended Day Care operation in 1975.

Upon Uffelman's 1977 retirement as principal, Jerry Reinertson became the school's second administrator and served in this capacity for the first time from 1977 to 1982. From 1970 to 1977 he had served Good Shepherd Church as Youth Director and taught Social Studies and Current Events as single subjects for sixth through eighth grades (he had been a teacher at a Lutheran school in Cleveland, Ohio, from 1968 to 1970).

An auditorium/gymnasium attached to the ERA Building opened in September 1981, the construction of which had been 11 years in the making. This new facility was the site of the indoor games of Good Shepherd School's athletic clubs, and also of dramatic productions. Former Los Angeles Lakers player Jamaal Wilkes even practiced in this gym.

The principal's position became vacant in 1982. Former sixth grade teacher Ellen Hackerd served as administrator on an interim basis during the first semester of the 1982-1983 school year, but by the second semester, Norb Huber had been hired as principal in permanent standing. His most recent educational experience had been teaching at Leuzinger High School of Lawndale, California. Huber was Good Shepherd School's principal until 1988; and he was the founding principal of South Bay Lutheran High School of Inglewood from 1984 to 1998.

Reinertson returned for a second stint as the school's principal from 1988 to 1990. During the preceding six years he had served three years each as the principal of a Lutheran school in Tacoma, Washington, then as principal of Immanuel Lutheran School of City of Orange, California. In response to parental wishes, as they believed they were spending too much money for clothes, the school switched to uniforms in 1989. Reinertson stepped down again in 1990 on account of the long commute from his home in Anaheim, California. Subsequently, he was principal of Zion Lutheran School, Anaheim California, the second largest Lutheran school in the United States, from 1990 to 2002; and for the next eight years he was and continues to be the founding principal of Faith Lutheran Academy of Las Vegas, Nevada. Patrick Gagan was principal from 1990 to 1991; and subsequently was in the same post at Redeemer Lutheran School of South Gate, California. Bob King served as Good Shepherd's principal from 1991 to 1993.

=== Decline and closure ===
Good Shepherd School had to weather a major crisis during the 1993-1994 academic year, one of the effects of which was the absorption of substantial losses to the total assets of the school and church. The school reorganized in September 1994 as a substantially smaller institution. Classes were combined; and ultimately kindergarten was dropped as a grade. The teaching staff divided various administrative chores for the following two years. Peggye Holmes became the principal of the school for the first time in 1996, having previously served as administrator of the now defunct Faith Lutheran School and Church along Broadway in central Los Angeles. Harry Cypher (/ˈsiːfər/ SEE-fər) was elected and called to be principal of the school in 1998, as he had a longer experience in school administration per se. Holmes temporarily switched to full-time work in the classroom. Cypher accepted a call to be principal of Faith Lutheran School of Whittier, California in 2001; and . Holmes returned for a second stint as Good Shepherd School's principal.

\Partially on account of the school having a smaller enrollment after its apex years in terms of numbers of students during the 1970s and thus having a smaller "safety margin" to make annual budget projections, it had been a limited money-losing enterprise for the church for several years (during the 1980s, for example, the school lost an average of around $9,000 per academic year). After each academic year, the school's operating losses were covered by the church's assets. But as the church was smaller than during its own apex years, the question inevitably emerged as to how long the total assets of Good Shepherd could cover the school's annual losses. Shortly after the 2002-2003 academic year began, South Bay Lutheran High School launched plans to develop a "middle school preparatory academy" on its campus at Concordia Lutheran Church of Inglewood for sixth through eighth grades, which proved ultimately successful. Simultaneously with this development, in November 2002, Century Housing, Culver City, California, offered to pay rent to the church expressing an interest in using the ERA Building facility for a public charter school. The possibility of continuing Good Shepherd School as an institution for elementary grades only was rejected; and the church government elected in January 2003 to close the school at the end of the academic year five months later, and rent the ERA Building to Century Housing. Century Community Charter School opened in September 2004.

== List of principals^{[a]} ==
1. Walter A. Uffelman (1936–1977)
2. Jerry Reinertson (1977–1982)
3. Ellen Hackerd (interim) (1982–1983)
4. Norb Huber (1983–1988)
5. Jerry Reinertson (1988–1990)
6. Patrick Gagan (1990–1991)
7. Bob King (1991–1994)
8. Peggye Holmes (1996–1998)
9. Harry Cypher (1998–2001)
10. Peggye Holmes (2001–2003)

== Programs ==
The Vicar Program was established in 1957 and operated until 1990. The first vicar was Rev. Lambert Loock, Jr.

The Extended Day Care Program began in 1975. The first director of the program was Phyllis Osborne (1924–2007), who ran the program until her retirement in 1986. The program continued until the school's closing.

== Notes ==
a. No principal 1994-1996. The teachers divided existing administrative chores when Good Shepherd School reorganized following the 1993-1994 school year.
