= Fairview Heights station =

Fairview Heights station may refer to:

- Fairview Heights station (Los Angeles Metro)
- Fairview Heights station (MetroLink)
