= Patricia Peck Gossel =

American science historian and curator

- Born: Inglewood, California, US
- Died: 2004
- Occupation: science historian

Patricia Peck Gossel (1944 — June 12, 2004) was an American science historian and curator, who chaired the Science, Medicine and Society Division at the Smithsonian's National Museum of American History.

== Early life and education ==
Patricia Louise Peck was born during World War II in Inglewood, California, the daughter of Elsa G. Erickson Peck and Harold G. Peck. She grew up in Murdo, South Dakota, where her father owned an elevator company. Peck attended Augustana College as an undergraduate, then earned a master's degree in bacteriology from Montana State University in Bozeman, Montana. In 1988 she completed her doctoral studies at Johns Hopkins University, with a dissertation on "The Emergence of American Bacteriology, 1875-1900."

== Career ==
Gossel had work experiences as an electron microscopist and as a clinical bacteriologist in the 1970s, and taught at Rochester Institute of Technology in the mid-1980s. At the Smithsonian, she was a major contributor to organizing the permanent exhibit, "Science in American Life," and she founded the museum's History of Biology collection. She laid the initial groundwork for the 2005 exhibit "Whatever Happened to Polio?", which was realized after Gossel's death, timed to coincide with the fiftieth anniversary of the Salk vaccine. She also curated a collection of items related to the history and development of oral contraceptives.

== Selected works ==
Scholarly publications by Gossel included "Pasteur, Koch and American Bacteriology" (2000), "A Need for Standard Methods: The Case of American Bacteriology" (1992), and "Packaging the Pill" (1999).

== Personal life ==
Gossel was married once, in 1966, and divorced. She died from cancer in Bethesda, Maryland in 2004, aged 60 years.
