= Edward Vincent Jr. Park =

Historic municipal park in Inglewood, California

Edward Vincent Sr. Park
- Centinela Park
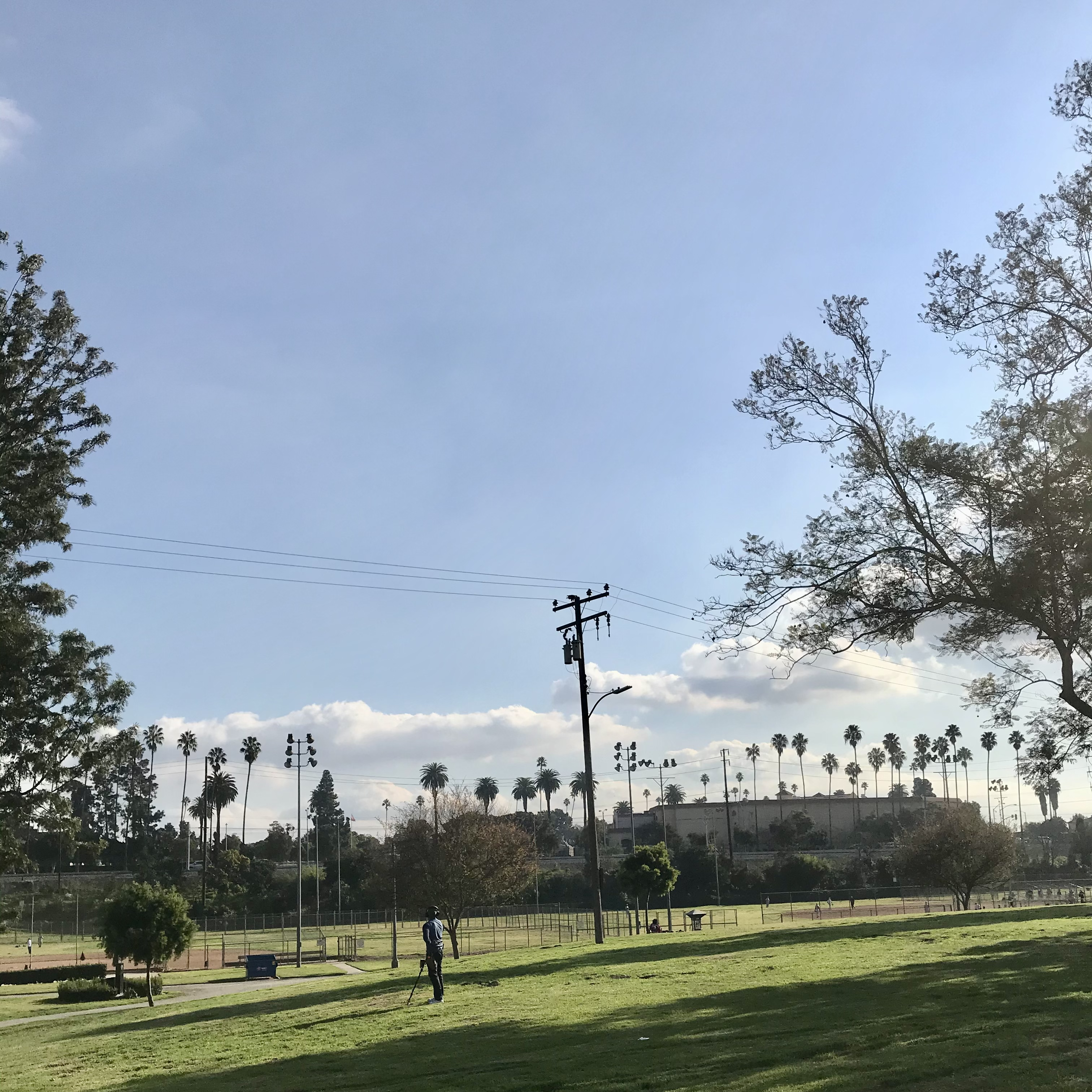
- Centinela Park vista
- Interactive map of Edward Vincent Sr. Park
- Location: 700 Warren Lane, Inglewood, CA 90301
- Coordinates: 33.9737°N 118.3439°W
- Area: 55 acres (0.22 km^{2})
- Established: ~1917
- Status: Open all year
- Paths: 1.2 miles (1.9 km) loop
- Parking: Free lots, street parking
- Public transit: Fairview Heights; Downtown Inglewood

Edward Vincent Jr. Park is a 55-acre (0.22 km^{2}) municipal park in Inglewood, Los Angeles County, California. Originally Centinela Park, the historic location was renamed in 1997 to honor Edward Vincent Jr., the first African-American mayor of the city. It was described as the "largest and most popular developed park in the Centinela-South Bay" in 1979. The development of the nearby larger Baldwin Hills State Recreation Area in 1983 was said to relieve some of the local demand on Centinela Park amenities.

== Amenities ==
Features of the park include a skate park, 1.2-mile (1.9 km) walking track, Olympic-size swimming pool and an "ADA-compliant bathhouse", basketball courts, football/soccer fields, softball/baseball diamonds, picnic areas, five children’s playgrounds, a multipurpose building used by the Girl Scouts, a playhouse, and an amphitheater. The eight tennis courts were renovated in 2019.

The 55-seat playhouse building at the park was built in 1969. The black-box theater, originally called the Inglewood Playhouse, was renamed the Willie Agee Playhouse to honor an Inglewood parks commissioner and Korean War veteran. The theater was closed from 2001 to 2016 but now offers acting classes, open mic nights, events organized by the Black Creative Collective and performances by theater groups like Ellen Geer’s Theatricum Botanicum.

The location is a popular picnic spot, attracting as many as 5,000 families each summer.

== History ==
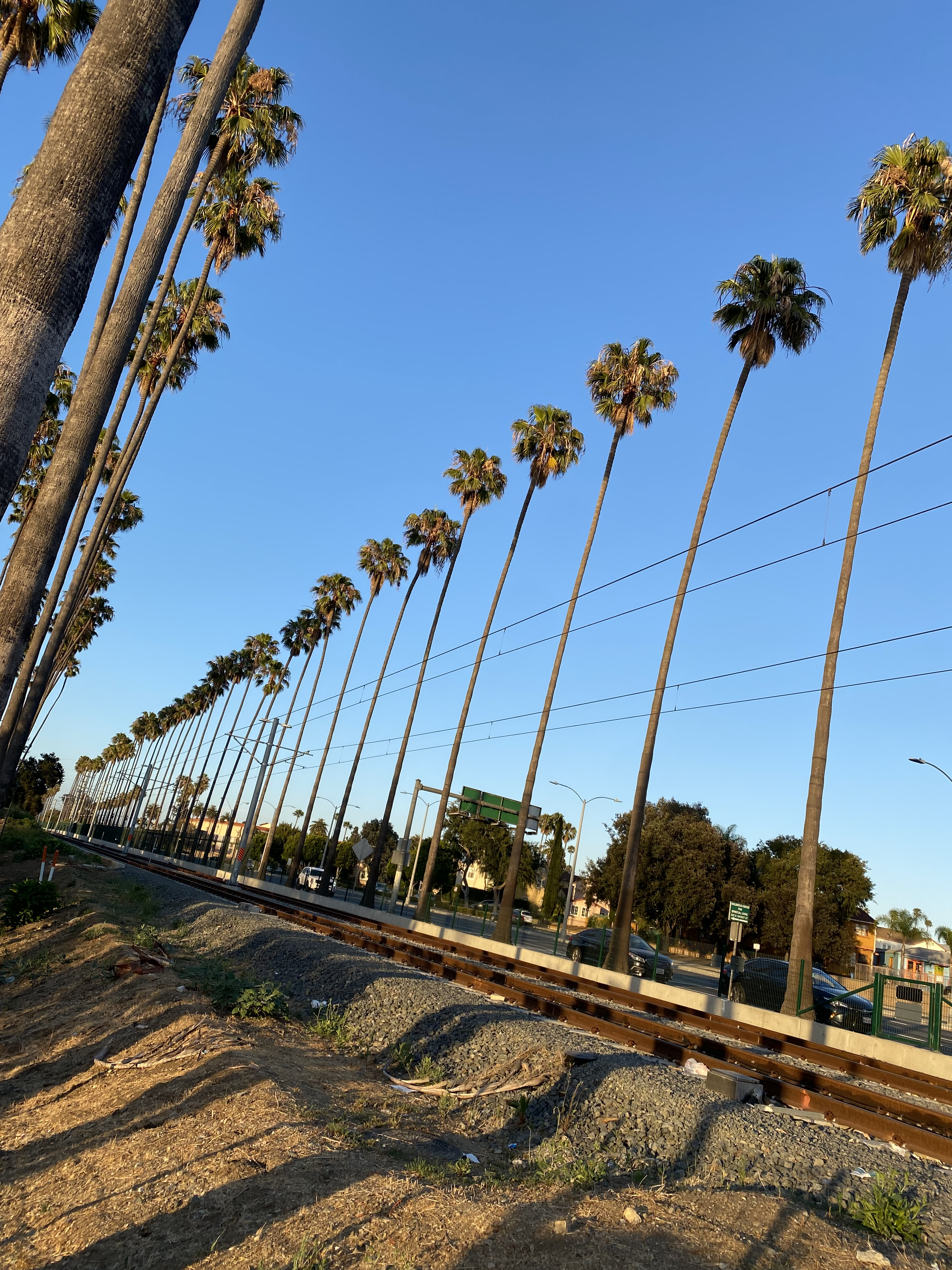
These palms were planted along the K Line right-of-way back when the Yellow cars used the track.

The park is the historic site of the Centinela Springs, an artesian spring that gave the 19th century Rancho Aguaje de la Centinela its name.

Trees were planted around the original site of the springs, in what later became Centinela Park, as early as 1886.

The park sits at the corner of Centinela Avenue and Florence Avenue. The K Line (Los Angeles Metro) tracks border the park; the Yellow Cars used the same right-of-way in the first half of the 20th century.

=== Early development ===
Prior to its use as a park, the site was "a brickyard, a [brief] mushroom-growing operation and a fig orchard which paid dividends".

Some sort of recreational layout may have existed by 1895: “Thanksgiving day the Inglewood Baseball club played the Brickyard Nine on the diamond at Centinela.”

The chimney of the closed brick kiln was ultimately demolished by the Keystone Film Company as part of a movie shoot in 1910.

The park’s street address is on Warren Lane; the lane is named after a person named J. Warren Lane (1872-1940), an early settler and nurseryman who "led a movement for development of Centinela Park and organized groups to sponsor tree plantings there in what was once a fig orchard he had set out". The 40-acre (0.16 km^{2}) fig orchard was originally owned by the Inglewood Water Company and later transferred to the city of Inglewood.

J. Warren Lane, who had worked the old orchard as a horticulturist (introducing the wasp needed to pollinate Smyrna figs), was appointed a park commissioner in 1925. In 1928 he organized a planting of three acres of native species on the highest point in Centinela Park, following a speech by Theodore Payne, "Los Angeles authority on wild-flower planting, who talked on the necessity for preserving California’s wild-flower heritage."

In 1929, Lane was honored by the city for "laying out and beautifying Centinela Park".

The local American Legion post was also heavily involved in the park’s early years, funding the Veterans' Memorial building and "the plunge" swimming pool, as well as sponsoring tree plantings throughout the park "in honor of fallen heroes".

=== The park’s New Deal ===
The park was described in the Federal Writers’ Project American Guide Series Los Angeles guidebook in 1941:

CENTINELA PARK (plunge, wading pool; bowling, tennis and horseshoe courts, baseball field, picnic ground with equipment), Redondo Blvd. and Prairie Ave., is a sixty-acre beauty spot [around] Centinela Springs in the ravines and gulches along banks of the Centinela Wash. Part of the area is landscaped, the rest is maintained in a natural state. Fossil remains of Pleistocene animals uncovered in the gravel wash have brought the conclusion that the springs were a prehistoric watering place. In the park are a large outdoor amphitheater and the VETERANS’ MEMORIAL BUILDING, built with WPA aid as a meeting place and recreational center for veterans.

Several elements of the park were built during the Great Depression. The swimming pool was dedicated in 1929; the cornerstone of the Veterans’ Memorial Building reads 1934. The massive "History of Transportation" mural by Helen Lundeberg now at Grevillea Park was a WPA project originally installed at Centinela Park in 1939–1942.

Besides the playhouse, another performance venue with the park is a WPA-constructed outdoor amphitheater with band shell, originally called the Centinela Bowl, after the famed Hollywood Bowl. Contemporary listings of the amphitheater as a potential filming location describe a "large cement stage with exit tunnels on both sides. 40 rows of brick and cement benches on sloped hill".

The park originally had lawn bowling and horseshoe pitching courts as well as many of the same features as today.

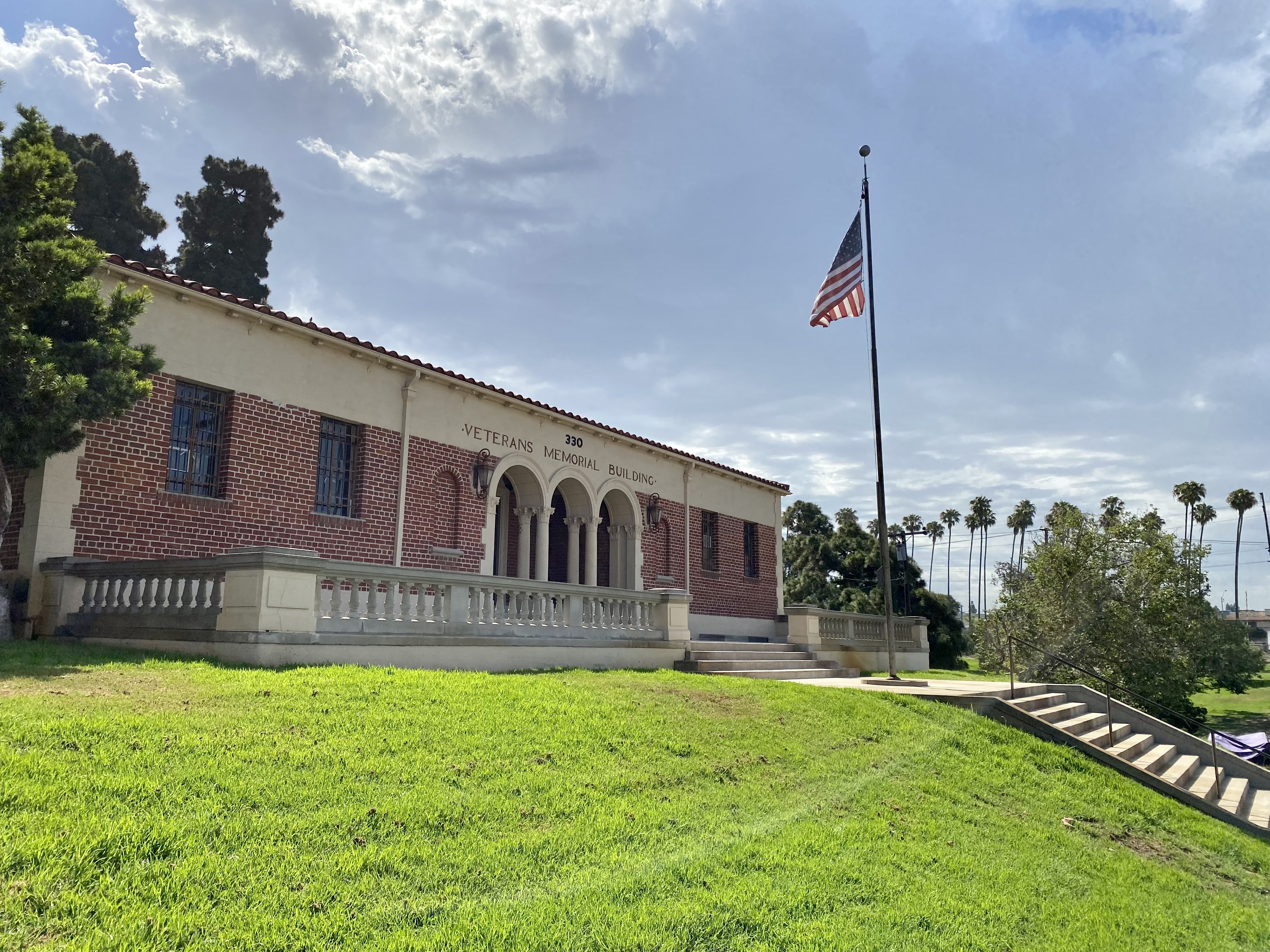
Veterans Memorial Building, Centinela Park, Inglewood, California

=== "Babes of Inglewood" triple murder ===
In 1937, three little girls were lured away from the park and subsequently murdered in the nearby Baldwin Hills. A WPA laborer named Albert Dyer was arrested, tried and convicted for the triple slaying and executed by hanging at San Quentin prison on September 16, 1938. The victims were nine-year-old Melba Everett, seven-year-old Madeline Everett, and eight-year-old Jeanette Stephens. An adult niece of the Everett sisters wrote a book called Little Shoes (published 2018) about how the crime impacted their family.

=== Pleistocene fossils ===
The fossils mentioned in the American Guide entry for Centinela Park were excavated by the USC Department of Geology in collaboration with the city of Inglewood in 1940. The Los Angeles Times reported that finds included "the Imperial Elephant, mastodons, a horse about the size of a present-day draft horse, camels, bison, saber-tooth tigers, great ground sloths, tiny deer, and many water birds, indicating that the area was a river during the Ice Age". Some of the finds were added to the collection of the Natural History Museum in Exposition Park.
