= Kim Schoenstadt =

Example of Schoenstadt's Now Be Here project.

Kim Schoenstadt is a Los Angeles based artist. She currently lives in Venice, California.

== Early career ==
Schoenstadt was born in Chicago in 1973. She received her BFA from Pitzer College in Claremont, California in 1995.

Schoenstadt's initial research into her art and architecture began by accident when she was waiting for buses in lobbies in Chicago. She says, "In downtown Chicago, you live with big obvious architecture, and many of the larger buildings had architectural drawings in their lobbies. The Museum of Contemporary Art, Chicago at the time was a very small museum run by Jan van der Marck, who used every square inch of the former Playboy offices to exhibit work – even the back stairwell had a sound installation in it by Max Neuhaus. For me, this was a big moment of "AH HA!" that showed me the way that art could change my relationship to the space. A bland stairwell became activated architecture – a place of wonder."

== Artistic projects ==
Schoenstadt’s work is based around certain points in time defined by architecture, sculpture, color, line, history, culture and concepts. She makes what are called “mash-up drawings” that allow her to create outside the box while incorporating architecture into her work that educates the viewer throughout the construction process of the buildings. She also includes drawings and sketches that are part of the architecture or photograph of a building. Examples of her work include three dimensional drawings with acrylic paint, pen and wood on walls. She also creates photos with drawings, collages and 3d shapes that are mounted on Bristol board. Overall, Schoenstadt merges the real pictures with imaginary she creates. She blends diverse architecture from different places around the world, and adds a fusion of styles that experiments with the current architecture and virtual reality. She won the Catherine Doctorow Prize for Contemporary Painting in 2011.

Another one of Schoenstadt's large projects is an event called “Now Be Here #1,” located in the exhibit “Revolution in the Making: Abstract Sculpture by Women, 1947-2016.” This project was started on August 28, 2016, located in Los Angeles, where she gathered female identifying contemporary artists at a show of contemporary female sculptors in the courtyard of Hauser Wirth & Schimmel and photographed them together. Schoenstadt said, “I had been thinking a lot about the challenges and rewards of being fully present in the different aspects of one’s life. This event was an opportunity to take a snapshot of all the female and female identifying working artists in the LA contemporary art community. It was an opportunity for us to capture a moment where we stood with each other in all of our diversity.” She also wants this photo to “shine a spotlight” on women artists and what they have created. Since then, Schoenstadt has traveled from city to city encouraging female-identifying artists to appear en masse in a photo, while each person holds an identified unique number, which helps each woman identify themselves individually in the picture, and will ultimately go online. The cities she has traveled to include Los Angeles, New York and Miami.

The project continued with Now Be Here #2 (2016) at the Brooklyn Museum, Brooklyn, NY, Now be Here #3 (2016) at Pérez Art Museum, Miami, FL, and Now be Here #4 (2017) at National Museum of Women in the Arts, Washington, D.C.

Los Angeles Times art critic Christopher Knight called her a "view painter," and compared her to Bernardo Bellotto, an Italian landscape painter. Knight says, “her work charts the intersection between the bricks and mortar of actual city streets and the effervescent elements of virtual reality. That's where we live now." The Fairview Heights station for the Los Angeles Metro Rail system incorporates her artwork.

A few of Schoenstadt's selected solo and two person exhibitions and projects include: Wadsworth Atheneum Museum of Art, Hartford, Ct.; Van Abbemuseum, Eindhoven, NL; Santa Monica, Museum of Art, Santa Monica, Ca.; M29 Richter & Bruckner Gallery, Koln, Germany.; Museum of Contemporary Art, Chicago, Il.; Sprueth/Magers Gallery, Munich, Germany; LA Louver Gallery, Los Angeles, Ca.
