= Gladys Waddingham =

American historian (1900–1997)

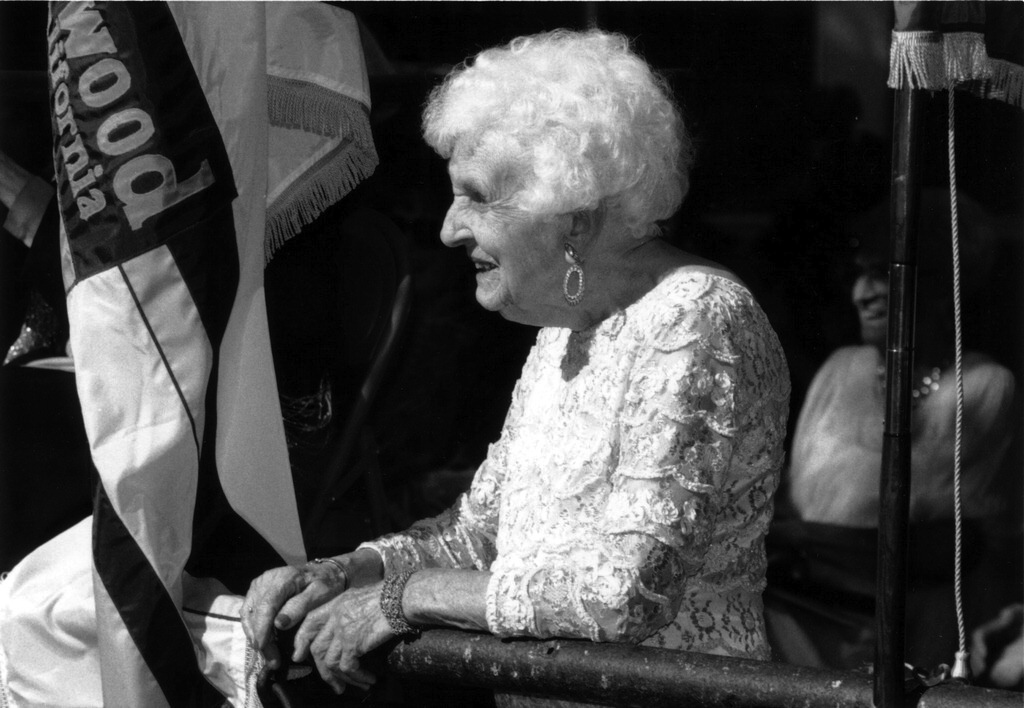
- Gladys Waddingham in the 1990s
- Born: Gladys Wolf; August 23, 1900; Custer Township, Mason County, Michigan
- Died: April 15, 1997 (aged 96); Alhambra
- Occupation(s): Teacher, Author

Gladys Waddingham (August 23, 1900 – April 15, 1997), a Spanish teacher at Inglewood High School in Inglewood, California, for 45 years, was the author of many books about her adopted city.

== Biography ==
Gladys Alice Wolf (sometimes spelled "Wolfe") was born on August 23, 1900, in Custer Township, Mason County, Michigan. She was the oldest child of George Henry Wolf and Emma Amelia Brandt. In 1910, the family moved to the Medford, Oregon, area for several years, where Gladys attended Medford High School for her first two years of high school. The family relocated to San Diego, California, and Gladys graduated from San Diego High School. A 1920 graduate of Occidental College in Los Angeles (and winner of the 1990 Alumni Seal Award there), she obtained her first teaching position in Las Vegas, Nevada. Waddingham submitted a thesis entitled 'Andalusia as portrayed in the works of Don Pedro Antonio de Alarcon' for an MA at USC in 1939.

When she was offered a job in Inglewood in 1922, she "didn't even know where the community was." She said she got the position because she "was willing to live in El Segundo and chaperone the school bus into Inglewood for a dollar a day." She was married to Frances Waddingham. They had no children. Her husband preceded her in death on April 14, 1983. Until a year before her death, she continued to live in the house in Morningside Park that her husband had designed. She spent her final year in a rest home in Alhambra, where she died on 15 April 1997, at 96 years of age.

Waddingham taught some ten thousand youngsters during her high-school career, including Robert Finch and Glenn M. Anderson, both of whom became lieutenant-governors of California.

Her books included a history of the First Presbyterian Church of Inglewood, of which she was a member; a History of Inglewood, two volumes of an autobiography titled A Kaleidoscope of Memories, and another book called My Memories of Inglewood High. She wrote The Women Who Made Inglewood because "I got so tired of all these biographies written about men that end with one sentence: On such a such a day, he married so and so."

== Death and legacy ==
Waddingham died April 15, 1997, in Alhambra, California. A Los Angeles Times reporter wrote in her obituary:

As Inglewood changed racially and faced growing crime problems, Waddingham was sometimes criticized for ignoring the efforts of black politicians in recent years. But historians countered that she was merely recording early Inglewood history as she had observed it and that Waddingham personally campaigned to urge white residents to remain as blacks moved in. . . . When her hip was broken during a 1991 robbery, she said from her hospital bed: "This sort of thing happens everywhere. It isn't a matter of Inglewood."

The Gladys Waddingham Hall was named in her honor as part of the Inglewood Central Library complex.

== Awards ==
The Centinela Business and Professional Women's Club named her Woman of the Year in 1967, and the Inglewood Sertoma Club gave her a Service to Mankind Award in 1973.

== Published books ==
- History of the First Presbyterian Church of Inglewood, 1890 through 1984 (1984)
- A Name Lives on at Beulah Payne Elementary School (1987e)
- A Name Lives on at Albert Monroe Junior High School (1987)
- A Name Lives on at Frank D. Parent Elementary School (1987)
- A Name Lives on at Worthington Elementary School (1987)
- A Name Lives on at George W. Crozier Junior High School (1987)
- A Name Lives on at Daniel Freeman Elementary School (1987)
- A Name Lives on at James Kew Elementary School (1987)
- A Name Lives on at William H. Kelso Elementary School (1987)
- A Name Lives on at Andrew B. Bennett Elementary School' (1987)
- The History of Inglewood (1994)
- 30th Anniversary of the Historical Society of Centinela Valley, 1965-1995 (1995)
- A Kaleidoscope of Memories, Vol. I
- My Memories of Inglewood High School (1995)
- The Women Who Made Inglewood (1996)
- A Kaleidoscope of Memories. Vol. II
