= Fairview Heights station (Los Angeles Metro) =

Light rail station in Los Angeles, California

Fairview Heights
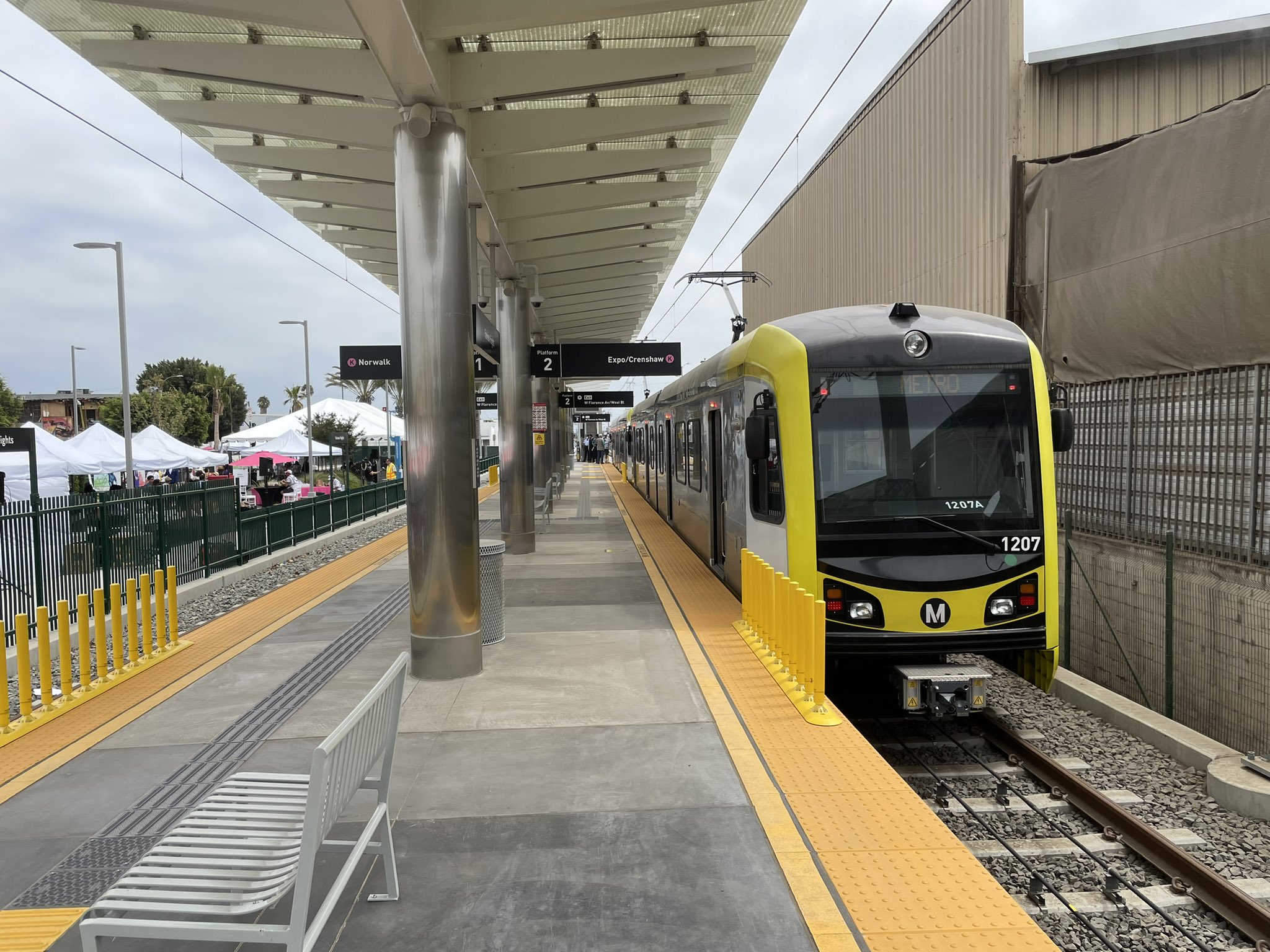
- Fairview Heights station platform during its ribbon cutting ceremony in October 2022

General information
- Location: 1130 East Redondo Boulevard; Inglewood, California
- Coordinates: 33.975347°N 118.335989°W
- Owner: Los Angeles County Metropolitan Transportation Authority
- Platforms: 1 island platform
- Tracks: 2
- Connections: Los Angeles Metro Bus

Construction
- Structure type: At-grade
- Parking: 200 spaces
- Cycle facilities: Racks and lockers
- Accessible: Yes

History
- Opened: October 7, 2022

Passengers
- FY 2026: 333 (avg. wkdy boardings)

Services
Preceding station	Metro Rail	Following station
Hyde Park toward Expo/Crenshaw	K Line	Downtown Inglewood toward Redondo Beach
Location

Fairview Heights station is an at-grade light rail station on the K Line of the Los Angeles Metro Rail system. It is located alongside Redondo Boulevard and near the intersection of Florence Avenue and West Boulevard in the Fairview Heights neighborhood of Inglewood. It is also near the Hyde Park neighborhood of Los Angeles.

During planning, the station was known as "Florence/West", with Metro adopting the current name in July 2015 in response to local feedback.

The station opened on October 7, 2022. Metro held a ceremonial ribbon cutting ceremony for the station on August 20, 2022.

The station incorporates artwork by the artist Kim Schoenstadt.

The Fairview Heights station will be the western trailhead of the Rail to Rail bike path.

== Service ==
=== Hours and frequency ===
K Line service hours are approximately from 4:30 a.m. until 12:00 a.m. daily. Trains operate every 10 minutes throughout most of the day. Trains run every 20 minutes after 8:00 p.m. every day and before 8:00 a.m. on weekends.

=== Connections ===
As of June 6, 2025, the following connections are available:

- Los Angeles Metro Bus: 40, 111

== Notable places nearby ==
The station is within walking distance of the following notable places:

- Centinela Park, including the Aguaje de Centinela landmark
- Hollywood Park Casino, (originally part of Hollywood Park Racetrack (1938–2013), still offers off-track betting on horse races)
- Inglewood Park Cemetery

Fairview Heights station and nearby Downtown Inglewood station are both within walking distance of the following sporting venues:

- Kia Forum, (commonly known as the Forum)
- Intuit Dome
- SoFi Stadium
