= RAT Beach =

Beach in Los Angeles County

Coordinates: 33°48′13″N 118°23′41″W

Redondo and Torrance (RAT) Beach is a roughly 3/4-mile stretch of coastline in an unincorporated portion of Los Angeles County, California. It is located along southern Santa Monica Bay, bordering the cities of Torrance and Palos Verdes Estates.

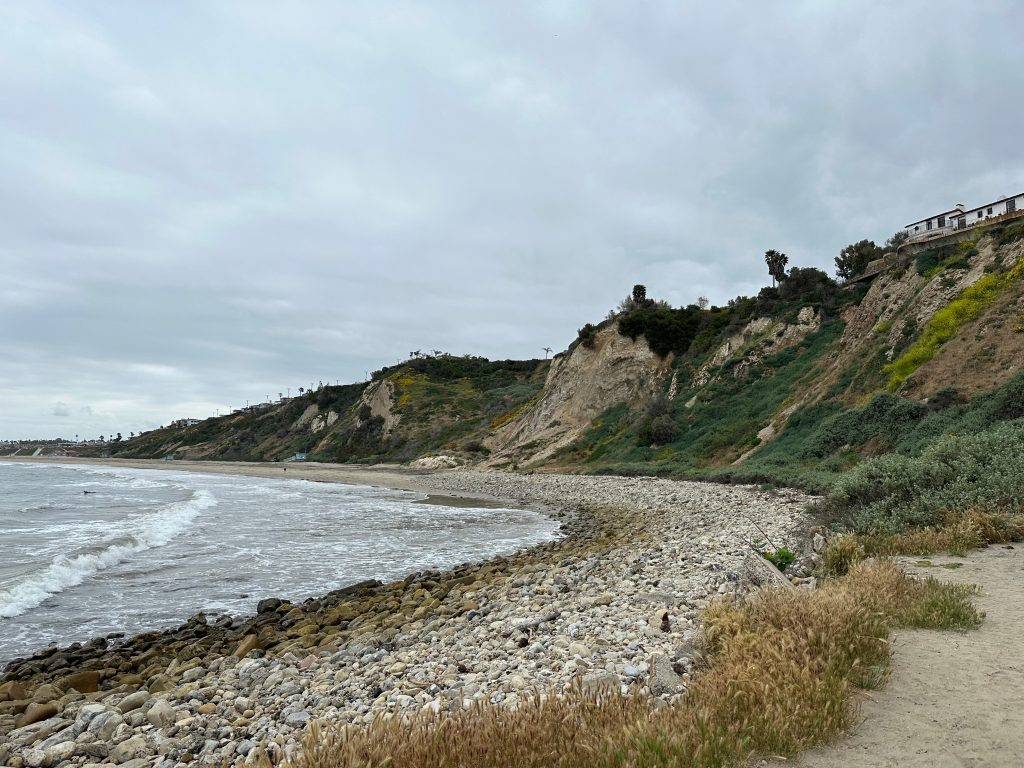
An image of Rat Beach from the path leading from the Gazebo

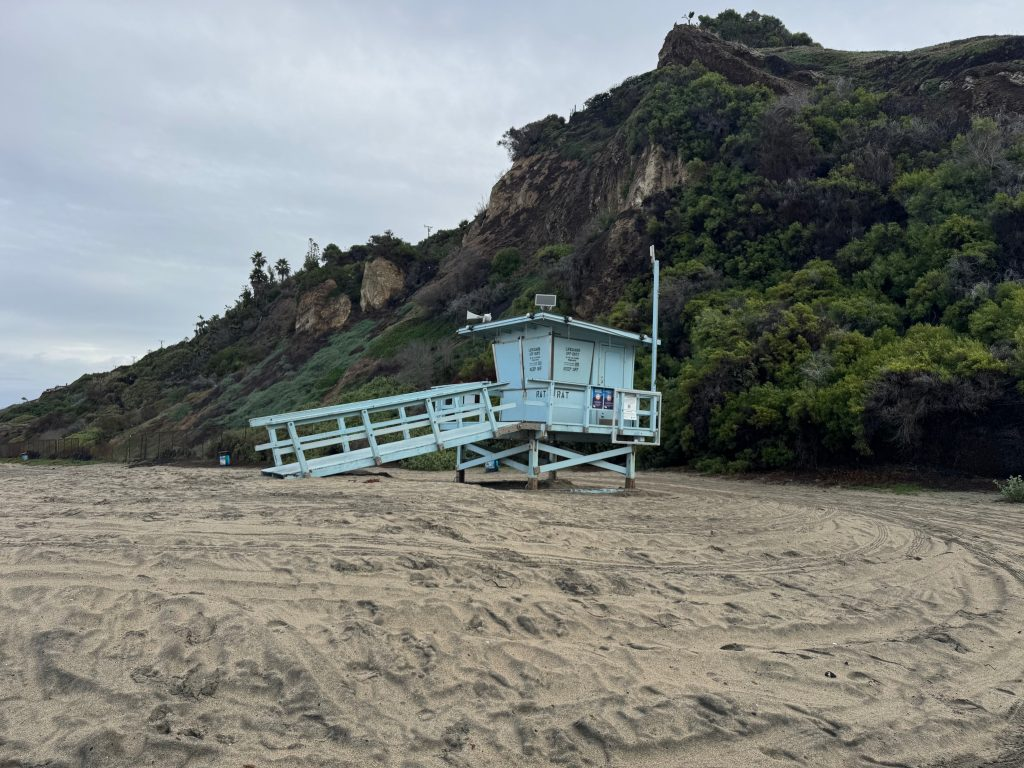
An image of the Rat Beach lifeguard tower with the word RAT written on it

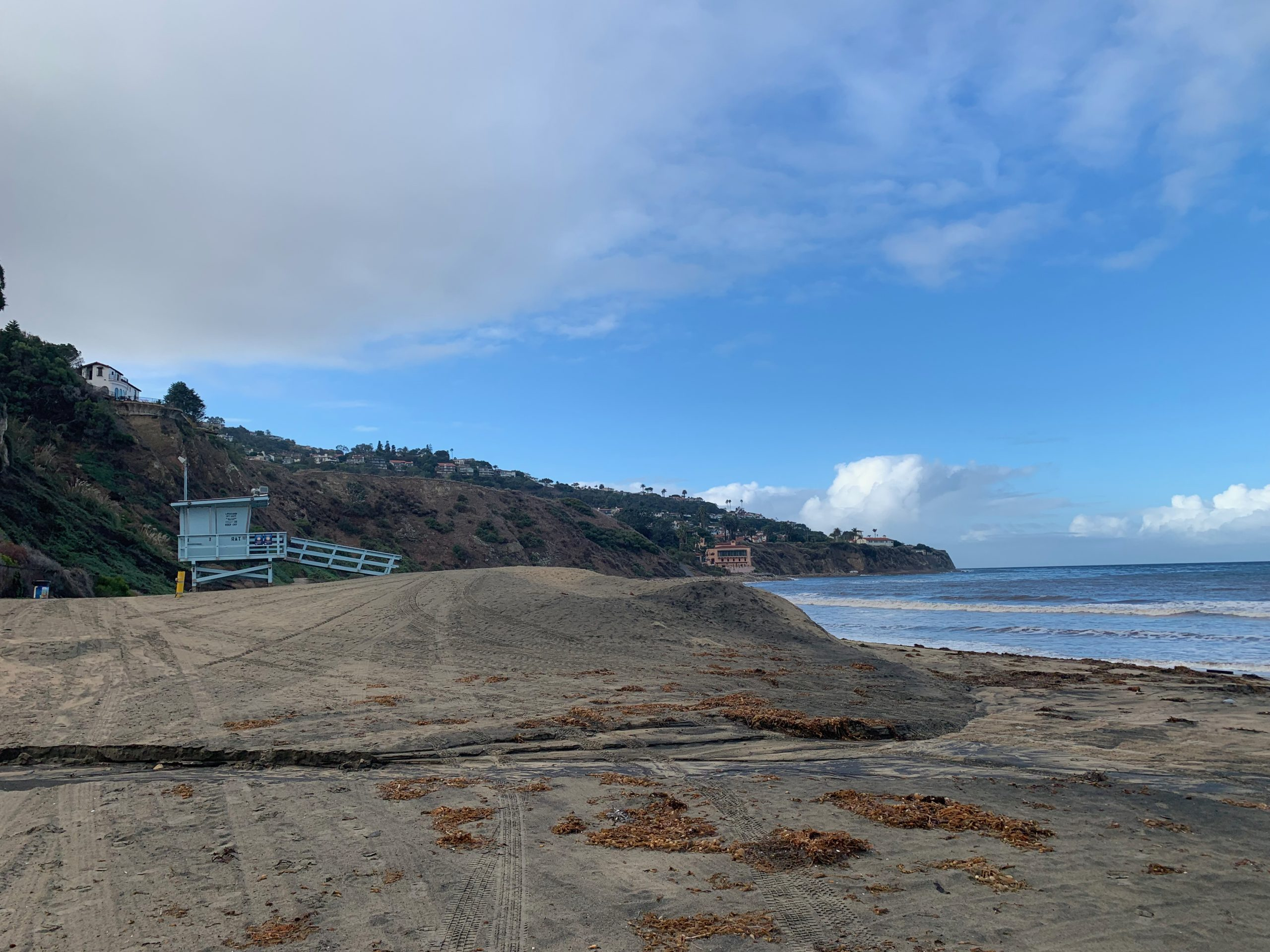
A view of Rat Beach from the North with the Rat Beach Lifeguard tower in it

== Access ==
RAT beach is located in a cove in between Torrance Beach and Malaga Cove.

== Beach activities ==
The beach is a popular local surf, windsurfing, diving and spear fishing spot. A large kelp forest just off the coast offers diving and spear fishing.

== See also ==
- Madrona Marsh
- Columbia Park, Torrance, California
- List of beaches in California
