= The Aerospace Players =

The Aerospace Players (TAP)
- The Aerospace Players
- Formation: 1988
- Type: Theatre group
- Purpose: musicals
- Location: James Armstrong Theater, Torrance, California 90503
- Website: TAP website

The Aerospace Players, or TAP, is a theater organization based in El Segundo, California, founded in 1988 as part of the Aerospace Employee's Association. TAP enables and encourages Aerospace employees, Air Force personnel, and members of the community to participate with high-quality musical productions. In other words, The Aerospace Players puts rocket scientists on stage.

The Aerospace Players are a founding member of the Torrance Performing Arts Council, supporting performing arts in the City of Torrance, California.

== History ==
The AEAMCC (Aerospace Employees Association Musical Comedy Club) was formed in 1988, with the intent of providing a forum for The Aerospace Corporation and Los Angeles Air Force Base employees, their friends, and their families to participate in the "lively arts." This troupe was founded on the belief that working hard to produce quality shows increases the enjoyment of its members.

The troupe's first musical, Grease, was performed in the TRW forum (a cafeteria), on a tile floor with wooden risers, minimal sets and lighting, and the music was largely pre-recorded, with a single musician playing accompaniment to the tapes on certain songs. No admission was charged and attendance averaged between 100 and 150 people per show.

Due to the popularity of Grease, TAP increased the scale of its subsequent productions and moved to an auditorium in the Recital Hall at El Camino College and produced several shows between 1989 and 1993. In 1993 TAP started performing with a live orchestra in their production of Bye Bye Birdie, albeit the orchestra was forced to sit in a cramped backstage area with the conductor, who also played keyboards, unable to see the stage. In one scene, as assistant watched the stage for a visual music cue, then sprinted to inform the conductor.

In 1994, the troupe moved to the James Armstrong Theater of the Torrance Cultural Arts Center in Torrance, California. This was its first "real" theater, with a 500-seat house, orchestra pit, professional lights, overhead fly space, and even curtains. It produced Guys and Dolls with a full orchestra of over 20 musicians and full scale sets. A minimal $5 admission was charged for the first time. The production drew a record audience of 800 people for four shows.

In 1997 the troupe decided to stage two productions per year; a "small" winter show, and a "large" summer show. Winter shows were intended to include a limited cast, a reduced orchestra, and simple production values. That year the troupe performed Once Upon a Mattress in the Hermosa Civic Theater in Hermosa Beach, California. The troupe continues to stage a smaller, winter production every two to three years, including such shows as City of Angels and 1776.

In the late 1990s, the club rebranded itself as "The Aerospace Players" to better reflect the make-up of the cast and crew who participate.

Since 1994, the club has produced annual shows in the Armstrong Theater. Some of its larger successes include the 1996 production of Fiddler on the Roof which drew 2000 patrons to six performances and the 2007 production of South Pacific which drew close to 1900 patrons.

== Reviews and awards ==
The Aerospace Player performances are frequently reviewed in the Daily Breeze and Beach Reporter newspapers of the South Bay in Los Angeles.

In 2005, The Aerospace Players received the Excellence in Drama award from the Torrance Cultural Arts Commission.

== History of shows ==
2023: Spamalot
2023: 1776
2022: The Sound of Music
2019: Joseph and the Amazing Technicolor Dreamcoat
2018: Mary Poppins
2017: Seussical
2016: Annie Get Your Gun
2015: The Music Man
2014: A Funny Thing Happened on the Way to the Forum
2013: The King and I
2012: Bye, Bye Birdie
2012: Camelot
2011: Once Upon A Mattress
2010: The Producers
2009: Brigadoon
2009: Cabaret
2008: My Fair Lady
2007: South Pacific
2006: Big River
2005: Kiss Me Kate
2005: 1776
2004: Joseph and the Amazing Technicolor Dreamcoat
2003: Guys and Dolls
2002: Oklahoma
2001: How to Succeed in Business Without Really Trying
2000: Oliver
2000: City of Angels
1999: The Music Man
1998: Damn Yankees
1998: Little Shop of Horrors
1997: Hello, Dolly!
1997: Once Upon a Mattress
1996: Fiddler on the Roof
1995: Sugar
1994: Guys and Dolls
1993: Bye, Bye Birdie
1992: Oklahoma
1991: Finian's Rainbow
1990: Damn Yankees
1990: They're Playing Our Song
1989: The Pajama Game
1988: Grease
