= Southern California Regional Occupational Center =

Vocational school in Southern California, United States

Coordinates: 33.824280°N 118.327260°W

The Southern California Regional Occupational Center or SoCal ROC is located in Torrance, California. It is a Joint Powers Authority serving 6 school districts (Inglewood, Manhattan Beach, Palos Verdes Peninsula, Redondo Beach, El Segundo, and Torrance). As of 2020, the six school districts sent less than 20 high school students each. SoCal ROC is accredited by the Western Association of Schools and Colleges. Admission is open to high school and adult students throughout Southern California.

== History ==
The Southern California Regional Occupational Center was founded in 1967 to provide training for trades in traditional occupational settings.

== Classes offered ==
Courses are developed with the cooperation of industry representatives from the career area for which the courses are designed. Many of the courses have an on-the-job training component.

=== School of Art and Design ===
3D Character Design, 3D Digital Animation, Adobe Suite (various), Creature Sculpting for Games and Films (2 course sequence), Digital Photography, Fashion Design (and Fashion Design Production), and Video Game Design.

=== School of Engineering and Design ===
A+ Certification, Aerospace Engineering, Automotive, CAD (Basic and Advanced), Cisco (4 course sequence available), Civil Engineering/Architecture, CompTIA Server+ Certification, Computer Technician, Engine Performance, HVAC (Heating, Ventilation, Air Conditioning), Intro to Construction Careers (Electrical), Intro to Construction Careers (Welding), Plumbing, Residential Electrical Wiring, and Welding (4 course sequence available).

=== School of Finance and Business ===
Administrative Office Assistant, Banking & Financial Services, Business Entrepreneur, Computer Accounting, Computer Applications (Excel, Word, PowerPoint, and Access), Payroll Accounting, and Principles of Law and Business.

=== School of Health Sciences ===
Advanced Medical Coding, American Sign Language I, Certified Medical Assistant, Certified Nurse Assistant / Home Health Aide, Clinical Medical Assisting (CPX), Clinical Medical Assisting (EKG), Clinical Medical Assisting (Injection), Clinical Medical Assisting (Venipuncture), Dental Assisting, Dental Assisting for High School Students, Dental Assisting-Career Preparation, Developmental Psychology of Children, Early Childhood Education - Curriculum, Instruction and Assessment, Early Childhood Education - Professionalism and Leadership, EKG/UA/Vital Signs, Emergency Medical Technician, Emergency Medical/First Responder, Human Body Systems, Intro to Pharmacy Technician, Introduction to ICD-10, Kinesiology/Sports Medicine, Medical Assisting (Clinical), Medical Front Office, Medical Insurance Billing, Personal Fitness Trainer, Pet Health and Grooming, Pharmacy Technician, Phlebotomy, Physical Therapy Aide, Principles of Biomedical Sciences, Registered Dental Assisting, Veterinary Assistant, and Veterinary Science.

=== School of Public and Consumer Services ===
Cosmetology (8 module sequence), Floral Design (I and II), Hotel/Restaurant Occupations (I and II), and Retail Occupations (I and II).
