= Columbia Park, Torrance, California =

Park in Torrance, California, US

Columbia Park
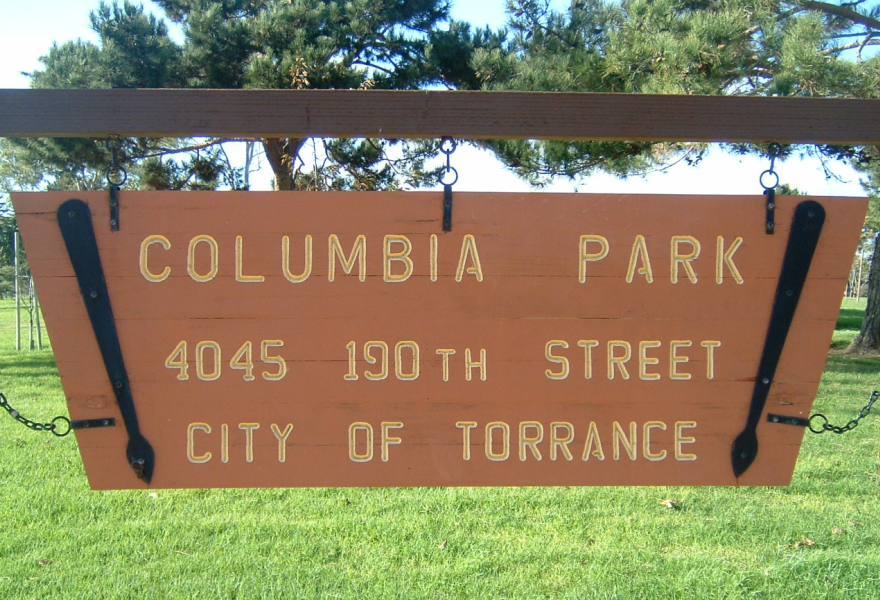
- The entrance sign for Columbia Park, in Torrance, California
- Interactive map of Columbia Park
- Type: Public recreational urban regional park
- Location: Torrance, California, United States
- Coordinates: 33.861°N 118.347°W
- Area: 52 acres (21 ha)
- Created: 1983
- Operator: Torrance City Council
- Open: All year

Columbia Park (formally Columbia Regional Park) is a 52-acre (21 ha) recreational urban regional park in the City of Torrance, located in southern Los Angeles County, California, United States. Columbia Park provides the community with soccer fields, baseball diamonds, bocce ball courts, community gardening beds, walking paths, and a jogging—competitive cross country running trail. It is one of thirty parks in the Torrance Parks system.

== Park features ==
=== Recreation and sports ===
Columbia Park includes six soccer fields, two baseball diamonds, and a roller hockey rink.

The park also includes a 1.32-mile (2.12 km) walking path which is divided by a fence line to the east of the main soccer field into a 0.75-mile (1.21 km) west section and a 0.57-mile (0.92 km) east section. In addition, the park has a jog path that serves as a flat, 2.9-mile (4.7 km) exercise trail and competitive cross country running racecourse. The heavily used soccer fields include lights for night play.

=== Community gardening ===
Columbia Park features a Community Garden providing planting beds and 'community' for residents. It is one of twelve county-operated Smart Gardening Centers around the region. Columbia Park additionally serves as home to the Home Garden Learning Center, and is a backyard composting demonstration center provided by Los Angeles County.

== History ==
Columbia Park was conceived in 1970 and built in 1983. In 1985, the park's designer, Paul Saito, received an achievement award for the design and installation of Columbia Park.

=== Phase one ===
Columbia Park first was conceived by former Torrance City manager Edward J. Ferraro. In 1970, Ferraro acquired 50 acres (20 ha) of United States Navy surplus property for $250,000 to build Torrance's Wilson Park. At about the same time, Ferraro put a plan together to acquire approximately 50 acres (200,000 m^{2}) of land in North Torrance to build 'Columbia Regional Park'. By December 1973, the Torrance City Council took a step closer to acquiring land for both Columbia Park and also for Madrona Marsh Preserve, protecting the last vernal marsh and wetlands remaining in the South Bay area of Los Angeles. In 1975 the state of California agreed to provide funds for the development of Columbia Park.

The park, located adjacent to an ExxonMobil oil refinery, includes a 494-foot (151 m) radio antenna that services the Los Angeles all-news radio station KNX (AM). There are also 120-foot (37 m)-high electrical line towers, each of which supports 220,000-volt electrical lines maintained by electricity supply company Southern California Edison.

Columbia Park was opened in 1983 as a 52-acre (21 ha) Torrance recreational regional park with large grassy expanses.

==== Sculptures ====
In 1983 Standard Brands Paint Company in Torrance donated a sculpture by public works artist Roger Berry to the park. The sculpture, entitled "Fujimihara", presently resides in the southwest corner of Columbia Park.

==== Women's soccer ====
In the late 1980s, Columbia Park became the home field to the Manhattan Beach club women's soccer team 'Ajax America Women.' On Sundays at Columbia Park, Ajax and the other women's teams played as many as 16 games on four fields from September to April. U.S. woman's soccer standouts, defender Joy Biefeld-Fawcett and forward Carin Jennings, were members of 'Ajax America Women' and regularly practiced and played at the Columbia Park's soccer fields. These two Columbia park players would go on in 1991 to help 'Ajax' win the U.S. women's amateur championship, and then help the U.S. national team win the first FIFA Women's World Cup in China that same year.

=== Redesign – walks and trails ===
When Columbia Park first was designed and planned, the design supported soccer and other field sports, but didn't serve the needs of walkers and joggers, the present day walkways and trails were not part of the original park. In 1984 landscape designer Paul Saito returned, to redesign Columbia Park to include walking paths and running trails, adding exercise challenges and aesthetic enjoyment. After receiving of San Diego, California, Saito had the park laid out according to his plan, with enjoyable concrete pathways winding around the hilly landscape. The park has, with sponsorship by Hydro-Scape Products Inc., around 100 distinct automated and water conserving sprinkler stations-zones to irrigate the 52 acres (21 ha). The California Landscape Contractors Association awarded Paul Saito the 1985 Achievement Award, for his creativity in the completed project.

=== Phase two – southwest ===
To enlarge Columbia Park, in 1985 the city council awarded Terra-Cal Construction a $173,655 contract for construction of the southwest portion of the park, expanding public access and amenities, and community green-space.

=== Phase three ===
In 2000, plans were made to increase the number of parking spaces serving the park users. In addition, the plans included attractive gazebos, which are located near 190th Street park area.

In 2004, the Columbia Park parking lot at the southwest corner of 190th Street and Prairie Avenue was used by Chevrolet as a filming location for their television commercial.

== Tree dedications – urban forest ==
On April 22, 1995, a tree was planted in Columbia Park by The Friends of Madrona Marsh to commemorate the 25th anniversary of Earth Day.

=== Cherry blossom trees ===
During the summer of 2001, the Buddhist association Soka Gakkai International USA donated the cost of 100 Cherry blossom trees to the city of Torrance as part of Torrance's Living Tree Dedication program that began in 1993. The plan for the program was to plant 10 cherry trees at Columbia Park as part of a ceremony each year for ten years beginning in 2001. By April 2007, seventy cherry trees had been planted in Columbia Park.

=== Living Tribute Trees program ===
The Torrance Living Dedication Tree Program is coordinated and by the city, so that families, individuals, and groups can sponsor the planting of a new tree in the park to honor a person or commemorate an event with a living tribute Tree Dedication.

== Park challenges ==
=== Sail-Skating ===
The long, winding cement walk pathways and usually vacant parking lots of Columbia Park quickly became a popular place for skate sailing in the mid-1980s. In the summer of 1985, a sail skater was clocked by a police radar gun doing 40 miles per hour (64 km/h) inside the park. Near the end of 1985, the Torrance City Council had enough and unanimously approved an ordinance that made it illegal to ride a "wheeled conveyance" equipped with sails on city streets, in parks or on other public property.

=== Gophers ===
The grassy expanse of the newly developed Columbia Park turned out to be an ideal habitat for gophers and quickly attracted and maintained a gopher population of more than 600 animals. The gopher holes made it impossible to use the fields to play sports. The gopher population was so large that an "exceptionally sized" hawk could perch on the top of the KNX antenna and repeatedly swoop down, snatch a gopher, and fly back to the top of the antenna to consume. Other animals also survived on the gophers.

In 1987, the city assigned Hank "G-Man" Baranowski to the park to address the gopher problem. At that time, Baranowski was known as 'G-Man' due to his ability to "wipe out gopher populations" and his reputation as the city's "premier gopher grabber." Within a few months, Baranowski had eliminated the gopher population in Columbia Park.

=== Safety concerns ===
==== People ====
In May 1993, a fight broke out among members of two gangs in Columbia Park. One of the gang members fired a gun that hit a bystander. However, a necklace worn by the woman stopped the bullet from completely penetrating her chest. As a result of the shooting, a neighborhood association's lobbying the city for park improvements, and homeowner complaints about "non-residents" using the basketball court and causing trouble. Torrance officials sought to improve security and took the unusual step of closing the park's basketball court by removing the basketball rims and padlocking the entry to the court.

==== Floods ====
Plans were created in 2001 to realign portions of the Columbia Park jogging path that were in lower areas or overlapped by sprinklers, to prevent flooded and slippery paths. The city added decomposed granite as part of fixing the problem, by draining water off the new raised sections.

==== Play equipment ====
In 2003, the Firetruck used as play equipment at Columbia Park was determined to not meet the Federal Safety Guidelines for preventing head and hand entrapment, and protecting children from falling off the vehicle. In response to concerns about children playing on the firetruck it was fenced off. Three years later in January 2006 both the firetruck and fencing were removed, with plans to replacement with "neat, fun, and attractive play equipment with rubberized matting."

=== Dogs ===
In 2006 Torrance considered possible sites, at both the city's Columbia Park and Wilson Park, for fenced-in dog parks, with two leash-free roaming sections separating large dogs from small dogs. In 2007, the city's Open Space Committee met to discuss the feasibility of adding city dog parks. Later in 2007 the committee had determined the only area large enough to accommodate a divided area for both large and small dogs was the Southern California Edison easement at Columbia Park. The plan required Southern California Edison needed to approve the proposal, and start-up costs of at least $50,000.

In presenting the proposal to the Torrance City Council one month later, the Open Space Committee stated:

"a dog park in Torrance is not an essential element of our park system due to a lack of unused open space and the absence of a grassroots community group supporting this type of park."

At that same meeting, the Dog Obedience Club of Torrance asserted that a Torrance Dog Park could bring potential liability to the city through dog fights, dog caused injuries, and spread of diseases and that the money would be better spent on the city's animal shelters. By a voice vote, the city council agreed that a dog park was not an essential element of Torrance's city park system.

== See also ==
- City of Torrance Parks
- Madrona Marsh Wildlife Preserve & Nature Center
