= Torrance, California =

City in Los Angeles County, California, US

- City
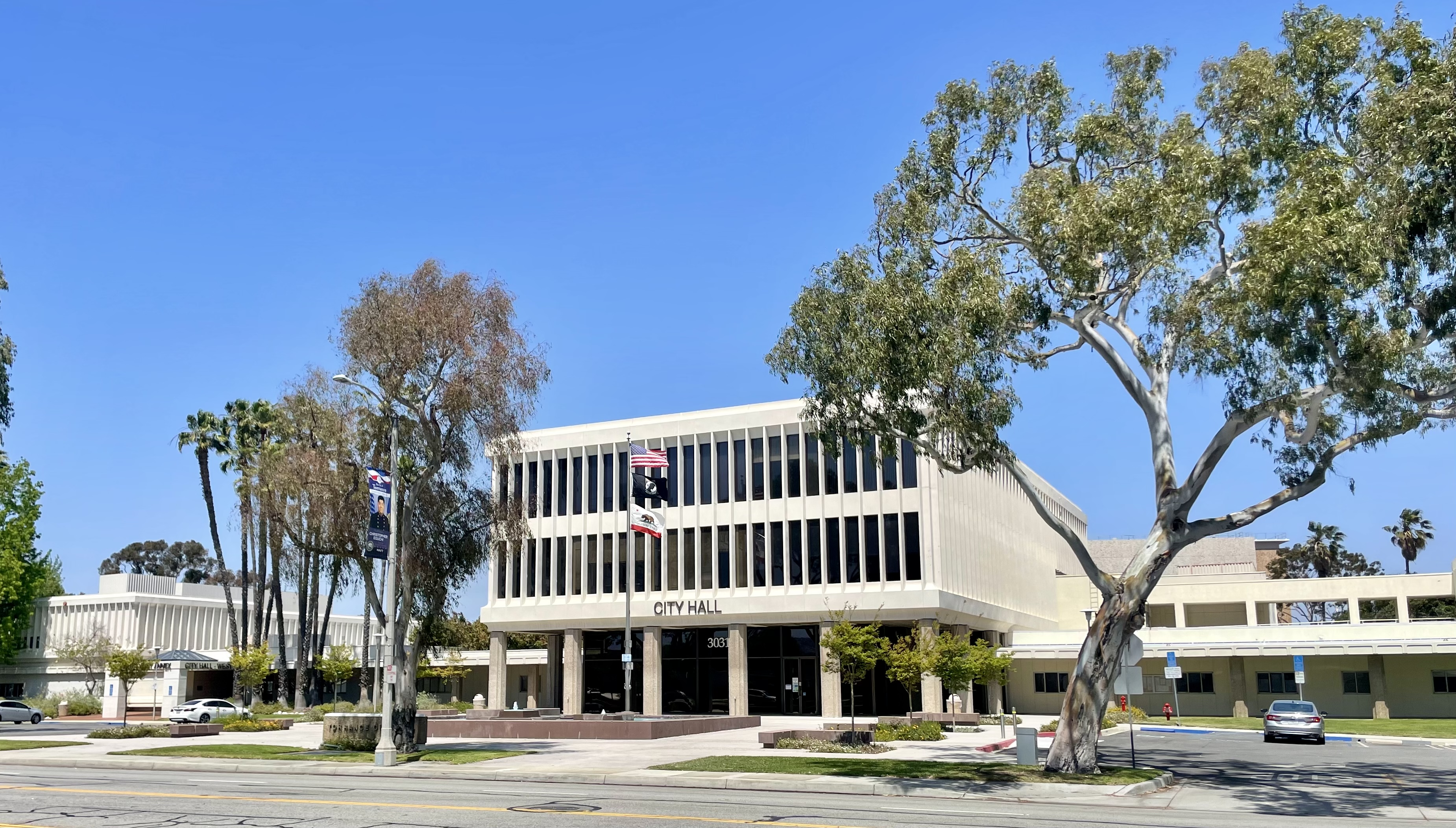
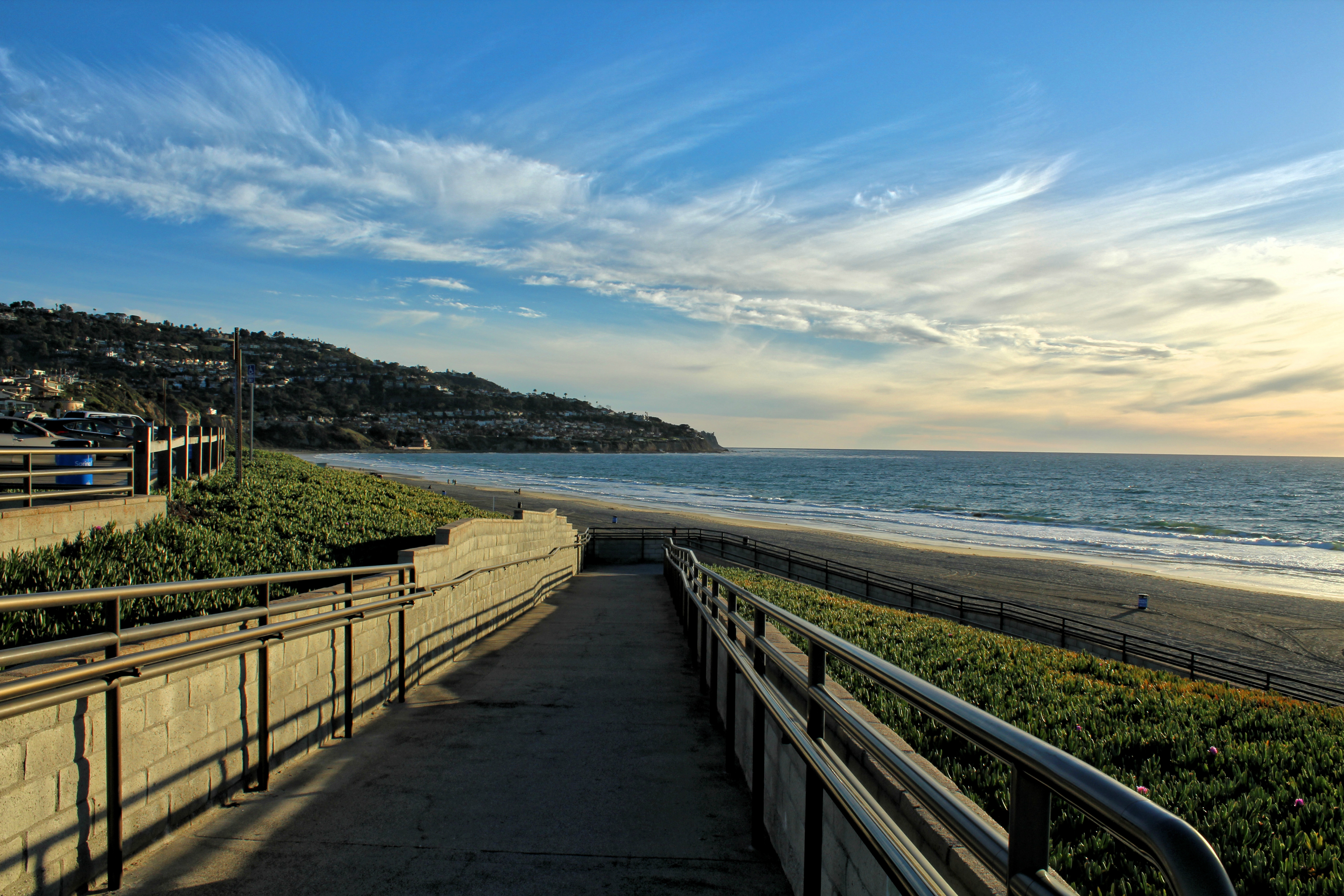
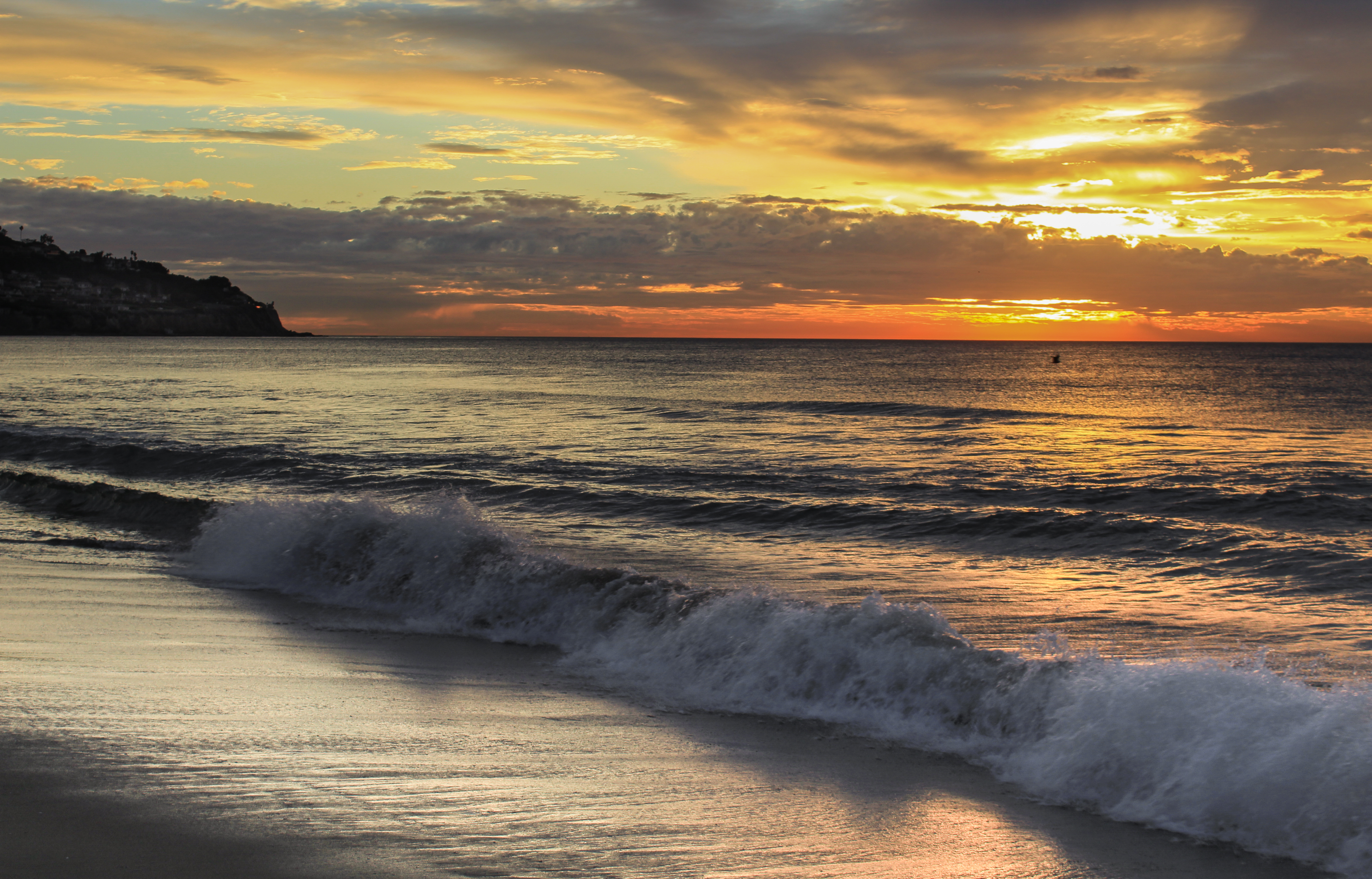
- Torrance City Hall Torrance Beach Sunset at Torrance Beach

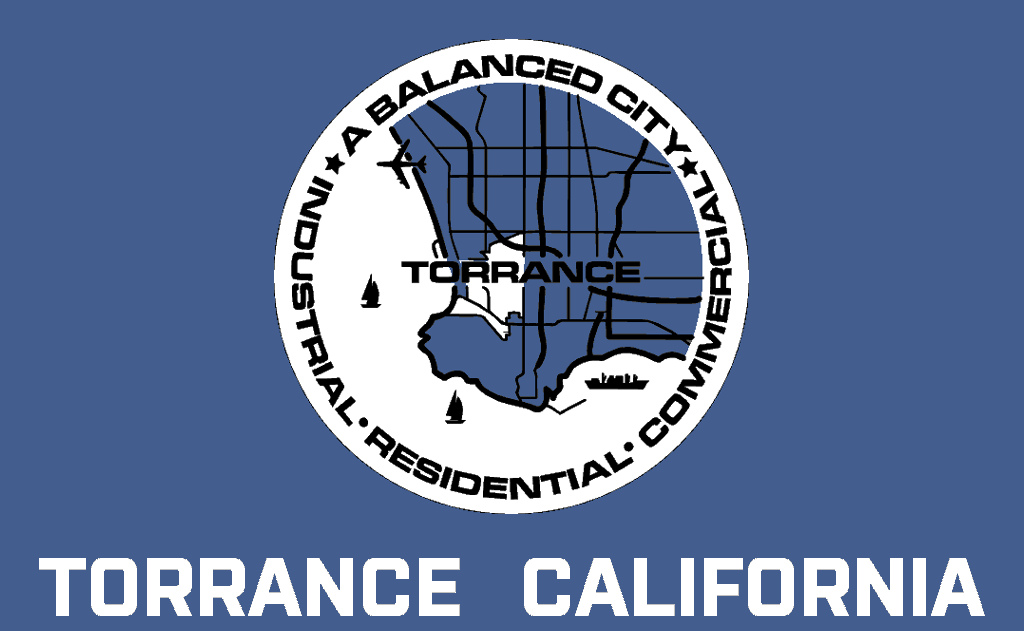
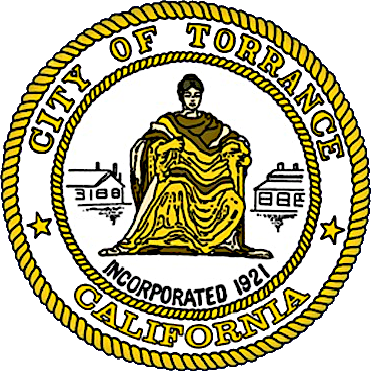
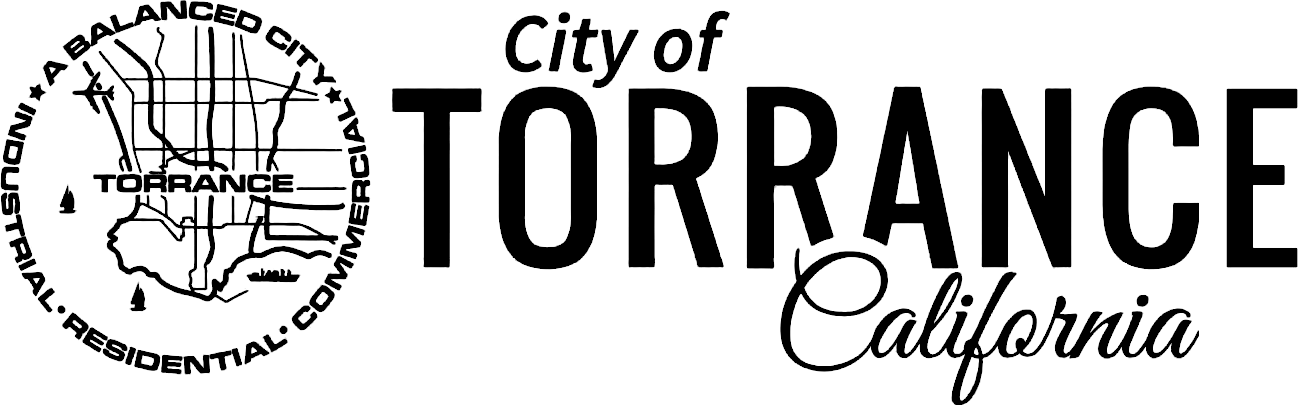
- Flag Seal Coat of arms Wordmark
- Motto: "A Balanced City"
- Interactive map of Torrance, California
- Location within California Location within the United States
- Coordinates: 33.830453°N 118.356618°W
- Country: United States
- State: California
- County: Los Angeles
- Founded: October 1912
- Incorporated: May 12, 1921
- Named for: Jared Sidney Torrance

Government
  - Type: Council–manager
  - Mayor: Sharon Kalani
  - Councilmembers: D1: David Kartsonis; D2: Bridgett Lewis; D3: Asam Sheikh; D4: Vacant; D5: Betty Lieu; D6: Dr. Jeremy Gerson

Area
  - Total: 24.612 sq mi (63.745 km^{2})
  - Land: 20.516 sq mi (53.137 km^{2})
  - Water: 4.095 sq mi (10.607 km^{2}) 16.64%
- Elevation: 82 ft (25 m)

Population (2020)
  - Total: 147,067
  - Estimate (2024): 139,576 ▼
  - Rank: 8th in Los Angeles County; 43rd in California; 205th in the United States
  - Density: 6,803.9/sq mi (2,626.99/km^{2})
- Time zone: UTC−8 (Pacific (PST))
  - Summer (DST): UTC−7 (PDT)
- ZIP Codes: 90501–90510
- Area code(s): 310 and 424
- FIPS code: 06-80000
- GNIS feature ID: 2412087
- Website: torranceca.gov

Torrance is a city in the Los Angeles metropolitan area in southwestern Los Angeles County, California, United States, founded in 1912, neighboring Redondo Beach, Rolling Hills Estates, Palos Verdes Estates, Lomita, Gardena, Lawndale, and Alondra Park, as well as the Los Angeles neighborhoods of Harbor City and Harbor Gateway. The city is part of what is known as the South Bay region.

Torrance has a moderate year-round climate with average rainfall of 12 inches (300 mm) per year. Torrance has one and a half miles (2.4 km) of beachfront abutting Santa Monica Bay and 30 parks. It is the birthplace of the American Youth Soccer Organization (AYSO). The population was 147,067 at the 2020 census, decreasing by 5.1% to an estimated 139,576 in 2024.

== History ==
Torrance was founded in October 1912 and was incorporated on May 12, 1921.

=== Pre-colonial era ===
For thousands of years, the area of Torrance was occupied by the Tongva Native Americans. The land that is now part of the City of Torrance and much of the modern South Bay was part of the extensive marshlands.

=== Spanish and Mexican eras ===
In 1784, the Spanish Crown deeded Rancho San Pedro (including present-day Torrance), a tract of over 75,000 acres (300 km^{2}) in the province of Las Californias of New Spain, to soldier Juan José Domínguez.

It was later divided in 1846, with Governor Pío Pico granting Rancho de los Palos Verdes to José Loreto and Juan Capistrano Sepúlveda in the Alta California territory of independent Mexico.

=== Modern Era ===
In the early 1900s, real estate developer Jared Sidney Torrance and other investors saw the value of creating a mixed industrial–residential community south of Los Angeles. They purchased part of an old Spanish land grant and hired landscape architect Frederick Law Olmsted Jr. to design a planned community. The resulting town was founded in October 1912 and named after Torrance. The city of Torrance was formally incorporated in May 1921, the townsite initially being bounded by Western Avenue on the east, Del Amo Boulevard on the north, Crenshaw Boulevard on the west, and on the south both by Plaza del Amo east of where it meets Carson Street, and by Carson Street west of where it meets Plaza del Amo.

The first residential avenue created in Torrance was Gramercy and the second avenue was Andreo. Many of the houses on these avenues reached the centennial mark in 2012. Both avenues are located in the area referred to as Old Torrance. This section of Torrance is under review to be classified as a historical district. Some of the early civic and residential buildings were designed by the renowned and innovative Southern California architect Irving Gill, in his distinctive combining of Mission Revival and early Modernist architecture.

==== Historic Olmsted District ====
Torrance was planned as a new prototype of a balanced industrial city based on the principles of the Garden City Movement. The original tract developed by the Olmsted Brothers consists of 109 city blocks divided into three sub-districts: residential, commercial, and industrial. The plan is most notable for its axial landscaped downtown commercial neighborhood aligned to have a view of Mount San Antonio in the San Gabriel Mountains. The Olmsted Tract includes a number of buildings designed by the noted Southern California Architect Irving Gill, including the original train depot.

The footprint of the downtown neighborhood, now called Old Torrance, was designed on a diagonal to allow the trade breezes coming from the Pacific Ocean to keep the air clean from industrial pollution for the residential and commercial neighborhoods. The industrial sections of the city were placed on the eastern side of the original tract.

Public transportation played a key role in the founding of Torrance. The Pacific Electric Red Car connected downtown Los Angeles to the new development of downtown Torrance. Designed in 1912 by Irving Gill, the terminus depot of the Red Car line was designed in a Spanish revival style popularized during this era. In May 1913, the Pacific Electric Railroad Bridge was built. Often called the "El Prado Bridge", it further expanded the industrial heart of the South Bay. The concrete double-tracked arch bridge was the Pacific Electric Railway's first interurban line that connected north–south to San Pedro via the Gardena Line. The bridge was used for transporting freight and commuting workers to Torrance factories. The Red Car line connected under the bridge as it connected to the train depot located on Cabrillo Avenue. The bridge no longer carries any rail cars, with Pacific Electric closing the Red Car line to Torrance in the 1940s. The bridge became the city of Torrance's second entry in the National Register of Historic Places on July 13, 1989, and is used as a logo for the city's new wayfinding signage and city materials.

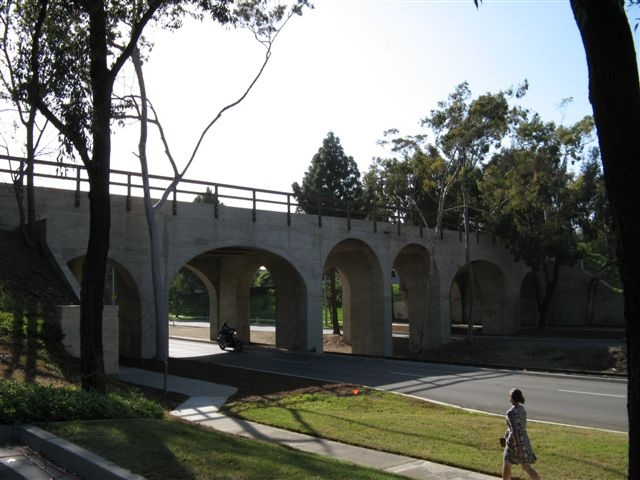
The Pacific Railroad Bridge, often called the El Prado Bridge, was designed by famed architect Irving Gill. The bridge stands as an icon for the city of Torrance.

== Geography ==
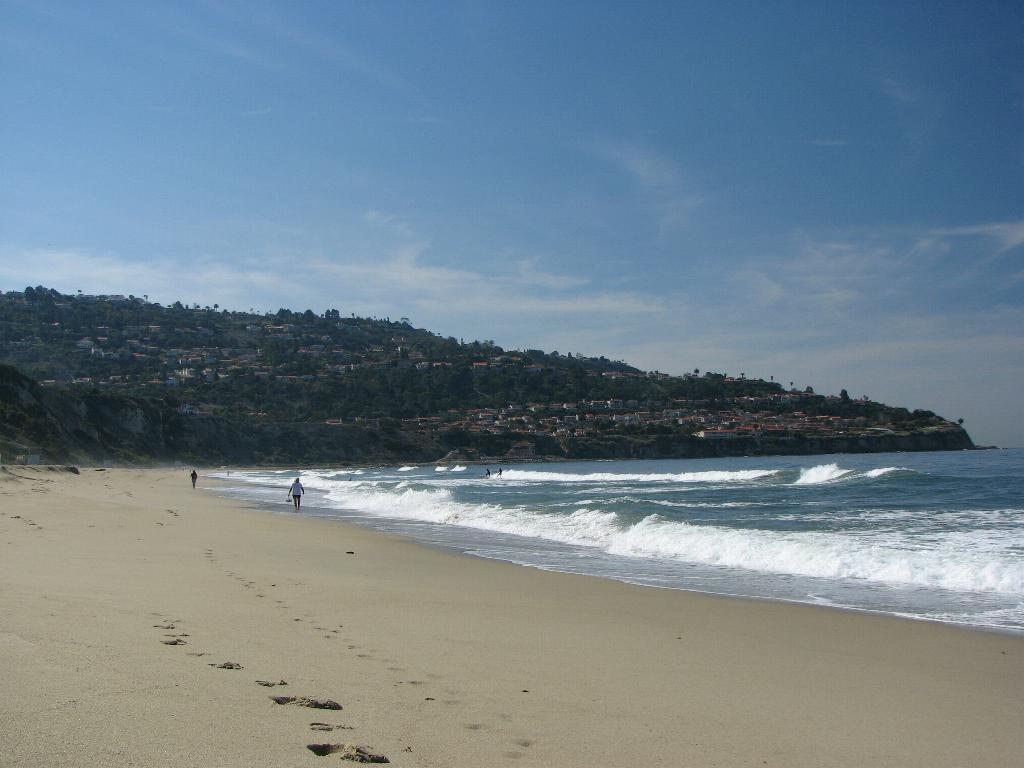
Torrance Beach lies between the Palos Verdes Peninsula and Redondo Beach on the Santa Monica Bay.

Torrance is a coastal community in southwestern Los Angeles County sharing the climate and geographical features common to the Greater Los Angeles area. Its boundaries are: Redondo Beach Boulevard and the cities of Lawndale and Gardena to the north; Western Avenue and the Harbor Gateway neighborhood of Los Angeles to the east; the Palos Verdes Hills with the cities of Lomita, Rolling Hills Estates and Palos Verdes Estates on the south; and the Pacific Ocean and the city of Redondo Beach to the west.

The western portion of Torrance is in ZIP Code 90277, which is a city of Redondo Beach postal address. It is about 20 miles (32 km) southwest of Downtown Los Angeles.

Torrance Beach lies between Redondo Beach and Malaga Cove on Santa Monica Bay. The southernmost stretch of Torrance Beach, on a cove at the northern end of the Palos Verdes peninsula, is known to locals as Rat Beach (Right After Torrance).

An urban wetland, the Madrona Marsh is a nature preserve on land once set for oil production and saved from development, with restoration projects enhancing the vital habitat for birds, wildlife, and native plants.

=== Climate ===
Torrance has a warm-summer Mediterranean climate (Köppen: Csb), bordering with a semi-arid climate (Bsk). The rainy season is November through March, as shown in the adjacent table. Summers tend to be warm but dry, despite Torrance's proximity to the coast. The Sunset Western Garden Book places most of Torrance in Zone 22, part of a basin area in Greater Los Angeles where cold air can pool—hence the surprisingly chilly record low temperatures for each calendar month at the airport, which has risk of frost over six months. Milder microclimates are found upslope of the airport to the south (Zone 23—thermal belt) and in the western blocks bordering the beach communities and Palos Verdes Estates (Zone 24—marine influence dominant).

Climate data for Torrance, California (Torrance Airport), 1991–2020 normals, extremes 1932–present
Month	Jan	Feb	Mar	Apr	May	Jun	Jul	Aug	Sep	Oct	Nov	Dec	Year
Record high °F (°C)	91 (33)	92 (33)	96 (36)	104 (40)	98 (37)	102 (39)	102 (39)	101 (38)	111 (44)	106 (41)	98 (37)	94 (34)	111 (44)
Mean maximum °F (°C)	80.8 (27.1)	79.6 (26.4)	81.4 (27.4)	84.6 (29.2)	83.1 (28.4)	82.7 (28.2)	86.0 (30.0)	87.3 (30.7)	92.0 (33.3)	90.2 (32.3)	85.8 (29.9)	77.5 (25.3)	95.5 (35.3)
Mean daily maximum °F (°C)	66.8 (19.3)	66.4 (19.1)	67.7 (19.8)	70.2 (21.2)	71.8 (22.1)	73.9 (23.3)	76.9 (24.9)	78.1 (25.6)	78.1 (25.6)	75.7 (24.3)	70.7 (21.5)	66.1 (18.9)	71.9 (22.2)
Daily mean °F (°C)	56.9 (13.8)	57.0 (13.9)	58.8 (14.9)	60.9 (16.1)	63.6 (17.6)	66.2 (19.0)	69.4 (20.8)	70.2 (21.2)	69.5 (20.8)	66.4 (19.1)	60.7 (15.9)	56.2 (13.4)	63.0 (17.2)
Mean daily minimum °F (°C)	47.0 (8.3)	47.6 (8.7)	49.8 (9.9)	51.6 (10.9)	55.4 (13.0)	58.5 (14.7)	61.8 (16.6)	62.4 (16.9)	60.9 (16.1)	57.1 (13.9)	50.7 (10.4)	46.3 (7.9)	54.1 (12.3)
Mean minimum °F (°C)	37.7 (3.2)	39.3 (4.1)	42.1 (5.6)	44.3 (6.8)	48.9 (9.4)	52.4 (11.3)	55.4 (13.0)	55.2 (12.9)	54.4 (12.4)	49.8 (9.9)	42.1 (5.6)	37.1 (2.8)	34.8 (1.6)
Record low °F (°C)	24 (−4)	27 (−3)	23 (−5)	28 (−2)	37 (3)	36 (2)	42 (6)	44 (7)	41 (5)	33 (1)	29 (−2)	27 (−3)	23 (−5)
Average precipitation inches (mm)	3.36 (85)	3.66 (93)	1.98 (50)	0.63 (16)	0.26 (6.6)	0.07 (1.8)	0.06 (1.5)	0.00 (0.00)	0.09 (2.3)	0.49 (12)	0.80 (20)	2.24 (57)	13.64 (346)
Average precipitation days	6.2	6.4	4.9	2.4	1.4	0.5	0.5	0.0	0.4	2.0	3.1	5.7	33.5
Source 1: NOAA
Source 2: National Weather Service

== Demographics ==
Historical population
Census	Pop.	Note	%±
1930	7,271		—
1940	9,950		36.8%
1950	22,241		123.5%
1960	100,991		354.1%
1970	134,968		33.6%
1980	129,881		−3.8%
1990	133,107		2.5%
2000	137,946		3.6%
2010	145,438		5.4%
2020	147,067		1.1%
2024 (est.)	139,576	▼	−5.1%
U.S. Decennial Census; 2020 Census

According to realtor website Zillow, the average price of a home as of September 30, 2025, in Torrance is $1,155,339.

As of the 2024 American Community Survey, there are 52,611 estimated households in Torrance with an average of 2.5 persons per household. The city has a median household income of $113,095. Approximately 7.3% of the city's population lives at or below the poverty line. Torrance has an estimated 59.2% employment rate, with 54.7% of the population holding a bachelor's degree or higher and 94.7% holding a high school diploma. There were 56,540 housing units at an average density of 2,755.90 per square mile (1,064.1/km^{2}).

The median age in the city was 43.7 years.

Torrance, California – racial and ethnic composition Note: the US Census treats Hispanic/Latino as an ethnic category. This table excludes Latinos from the racial categories and assigns them to a separate category. Hispanics/Latinos may be of any race.
Race / ethnicity (NH = non-Hispanic)	Pop. 1980	Pop. 1990	Pop. 2000	Pop. 2010	Pop. 2020
White alone (NH)	102,973 (79.28%)	88,390 (66.41%)	72,234 (52.36%)	61,591 (42.35%)	51,913 (35.30%)
Black or African American alone (NH)	867 (0.67%)	1,871 (1.41%)	2,911 (2.11%)	3,740 (2.57%)	4,781 (3.25%)
Native American or Alaska Native alone (NH)	—	456 (0.34%)	360 (0.26%)	304 (0.21%)	235 (0.16%)
Asian alone (NH)	—	28,821 (21.65%)	39,210 (28.42%)	49,707 (34.18%)	51,857 (35.26%)
Pacific Islander alone (NH)	—	—	434 (0.31%)	473 (0.33%)	523 (0.36%)
Other race alone (NH)	15,202 (11.70%)	171 (0.13%)	383 (0.28%)	505 (0.35%)	980 (0.67%)
Mixed race or multiracial (NH)	—	—	4,777 (3.46%)	5,678 (3.90%)	8,698 (5.91%)
Hispanic or Latino (any race)	10,839 (8.35%)	13,398 (10.07%)	17,637 (12.79%)	23,440 (16.12%)	28,080 (19.09%)
Total	129,881 (100.00%)	133,107 (100.00%)	137,946 (100.00%)	145,438 (100.00%)	147,067 (100.00%)

=== 2020 census ===
As of the 2020 census, there were 147,067 people residing in the city, making up 56,655 households. The population density was 7,167.71 inhabitants per square mile (2,767.5/km^{2}). There were 58,775 housing units at an average density of 2,864.56 per square mile (1,106.0/km^{2}). The racial makeup of the city was 38.99% White, 3.43% African American, 0.55% Native American, 35.70% Asian, 0.41% Pacific Islander, 7.75% from some other races and 13.17% from two or more races. Hispanic or Latino people of any race were 19.09% of the population.

The census reported that 99.0% of the population lived in households, 0.5% lived in non-institutionalized group quarters, and 0.5% were institutionalized.

There were 56,655 households, out of which 30.0% included children under the age of 18, 52.4% were married-couple households, 4.8% were cohabiting couple households, 25.8% had a female householder with no partner present, and 16.9% had a male householder with no partner present. 25.6% of households were one person, and 11.2% were one person aged 65 or older. The average household size was 2.57. There were 38,894 families (68.7% of all households).

The age distribution was 19.5% under the age of 18, 7.4% aged 18 to 24, 25.8% aged 25 to 44, 28.7% aged 45 to 64, and 18.6% who were 65 years of age or older. The median age was 43.0 years. For every 100 females, there were 95.1 males.

There were 58,775 housing units at an average density of 2,864.6 units per square mile (1,106.0 units/km^{2}), of which 56,655 (96.4%) were occupied. Of these, 54.1% were owner-occupied, and 45.9% were occupied by renters.

=== 2010 census ===
As of the 2010 census, there were 145,438 people, 56,001 households, and _ families residing in the city. The population density was 7,102.16 inhabitants per square mile (2,742.2/km^{2}). There were 58,377 housing units at an average density of 2,850.72 per square mile (1,100.7/km^{2}). The racial makeup of the city was 51.11% White, 2.72% African American, 0.38% Native American, 34.54% Asian, 0.36% Pacific Islander, 5.37% from some other races and 5.51% from two or more races. Hispanic or Latino people of any race were 16.12% of the population.

The Census reported that 144,292 people (99.2% of the population) lived in households, 506 (0.3%) homeless who lived in non-institutionalized group quarters, and 640 (0.4%) were institutionalized.

There were 56,001 households, out of which 18,558 (33.1%) had children under the age of 18 living in them, 29,754 (53.1%) were opposite-sex married couples living together, 6,148 (11.0%) had a female householder with no husband present, 2,510 (4.5%) had a male householder with no wife present. There were 2,152 (3.8%) unmarried opposite-sex partnerships, and 309 (0.6%) same-sex married couples or partnerships. 14,472 households (25.8%) were made up of individuals, and 5,611 (10.0%) had someone living alone who was 65 years of age or older. The average household size was 2.58. There were 38,412 families (68.6% of all households); the average family size was 3.14.

There were 31,831 people (21.9%) under the age of 18, 10,875 (7.5%) aged 18 to 24, 38,296 (26.3%) aged 25 to 44, 42,710 (29.4%) aged 45 to 64, and 21,726 (14.9%) who were 65 years of age or older. The median age was 41.3 years. For every 100 females, there were 94.7 males. For every 100 females age 18 and over, there were 91.8 males.

There were 58,377 housing units at an average density of 2,840.3 units per square mile (1,096.6 units/km^{2}), of which 31,621 (56.5%) were owner-occupied, and 24,380 (43.5%) were occupied by renters. The homeowner vacancy rate was 0.8%; the rental vacancy rate was 5.3%. 85,308 people (58.7% of the population) lived in owner-occupied housing units, and 58,984 people (40.6%) lived in rental housing units.

Torrance has the second-highest percentage of residents of Japanese ancestry in California (8.9%), after the neighboring city of Gardena.

=== Japanese Americans ===
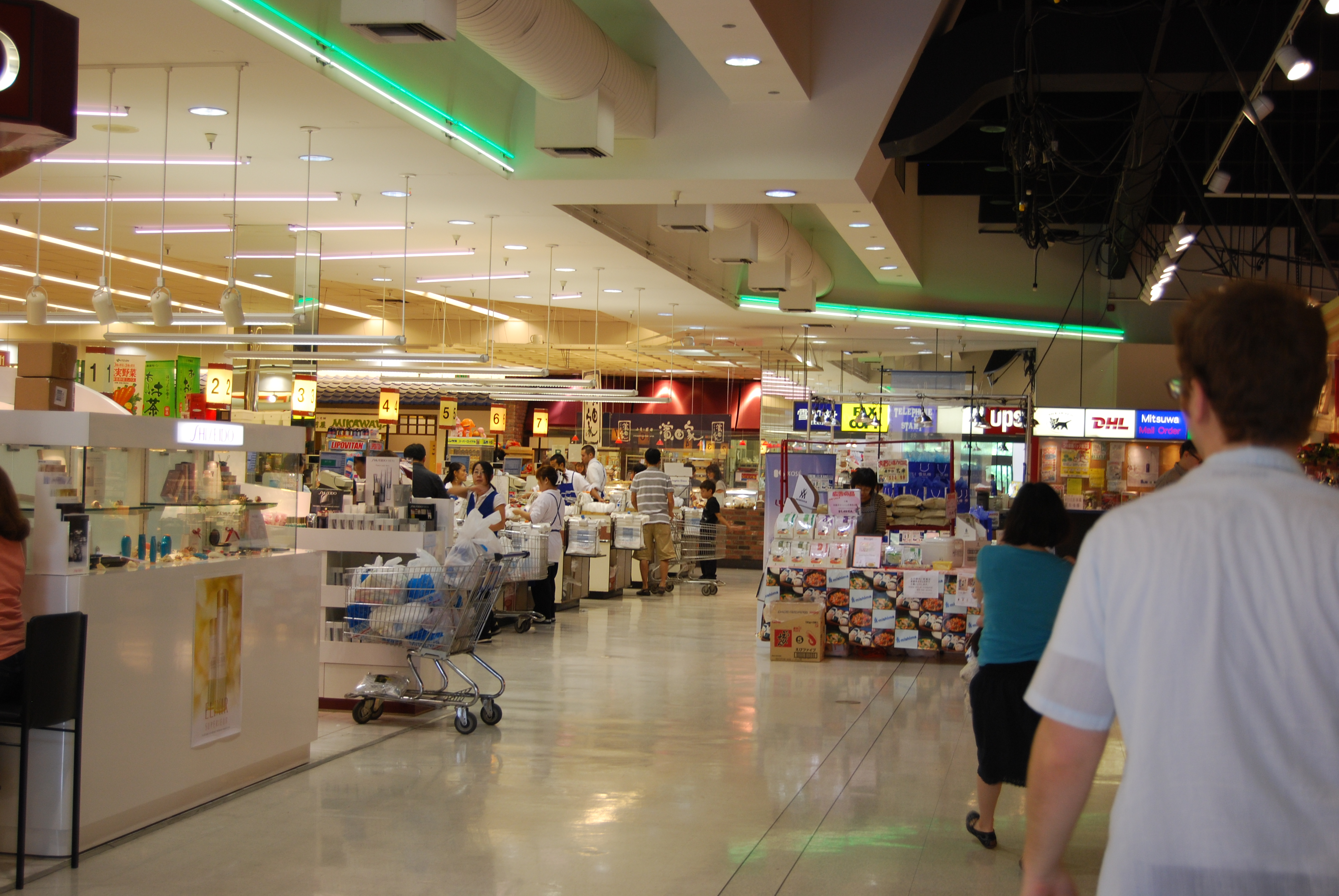
The inside of the old demolished Torrance Mitsuwa (relocated to the Del Amo Mall)

As of 2014, Torrance had the second-largest concentration of people of Japanese ancestry of any U.S. city, after Honolulu. The city has offices of numerous Japanese companies, including those in the automotive industry. Because of this, many Japanese restaurants and other cultural offerings are in the city, and Willy Blackmore of L.A. Weekly wrote that Torrance was "essentially Japan's 48th prefecture". Japanese supermarkets, schools, and banks serve the community.

In the pre-World War II period, the South Bay region was one of the few areas that allowed non-U.S. citizens to acquire property, so a Japanese presence came. According to John Kaji, a Torrance resident quoted in Public Radio International who was the son of Toyota's first American-based accountant, the Japanese corporate presence in Torrance, beginning with Toyota, attracted many ethnic Japanese. Toyota moved its operations to its Torrance campus in 1982 because of its proximity to the Port of Long Beach and Los Angeles International Airport, and many other Japanese companies followed suit. In 2014, Toyota announced it was moving its U.S. headquarters to Plano, Texas.

=== Korean Americans ===
As of 1992, about 60% of the Korean population in the South Bay region lived in Torrance and Gardena. In 1990, 5,888 ethnic Koreans lived in Torrance, a 256% increase from the 1980 figure of 1,652.

=== Homelessness ===
In 2022, Los Angeles Homeless Services Authority's Greater Los Angeles Homeless Count counted 306 homeless individuals in Torrance.

Homeless population
Year	Pop.	±%
2016	107	—
2017	145	+35.5%
2018	187	+29.0%
2019	226	+20.9%
2020	332	+46.9%
2022	306	−7.8%
Source: Greater Los Angeles Homeless Count; Los Angeles Homeless Services Authority

== Economy ==
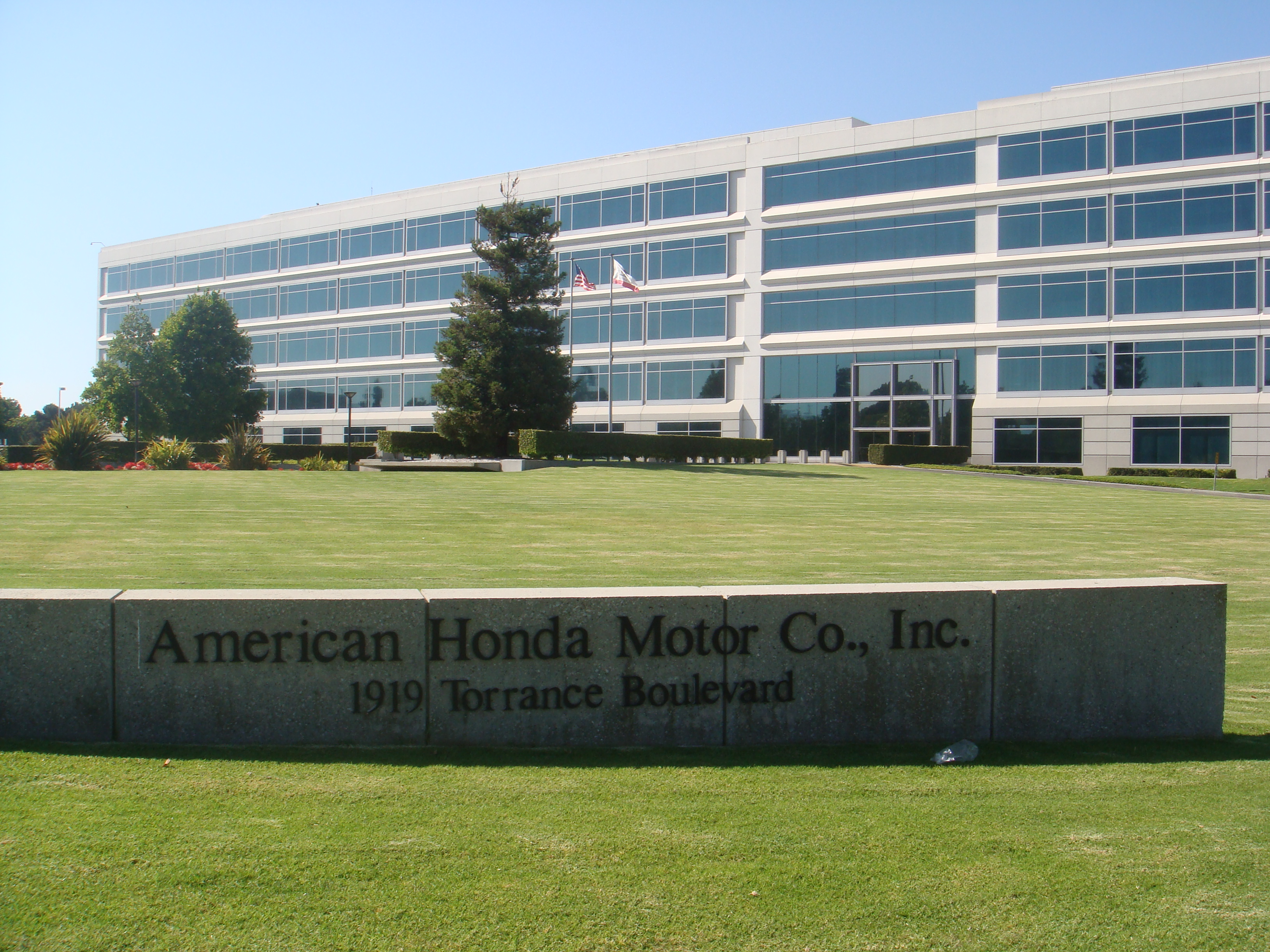
American Honda Motor Company headquarters

Torrance is home to the U.S. headquarters of Japanese automaker Honda and its luxury vehicle division, Acura. Robinson Helicopters are designed and built in Torrance as are Honeywell's Garrett turbochargers, used on automobile engines worldwide. Alcoa Fastening Systems (now known as Arconic) is headquartered in Torrance, producing aerospace fasteners. Pacific Sales, Pelican Products, Virco, and Rapiscan Systems are among the other companies based in Torrance.

According to the city's 2024 Annual Comprehensive Financial Report, the city's top 10 employers (by number of employees) are:

Number	Employer	Number of employees
1	Torrance Memorial Health System	4,070
2	Torrance Unified School District	2,675
3	Providence Little Company of Mary Medical Center	2,429
4	City of Torrance	1,556
5	American Honda Motor Company, Inc.	1,496
6	Robinson Helicopter Company	1,212
7	Honeywell Aerospace	766
8	Moog Aircraft Group	684
9	PBF Energy - Torrance Refining Company	607
10	Arconic Fastening Systems	583

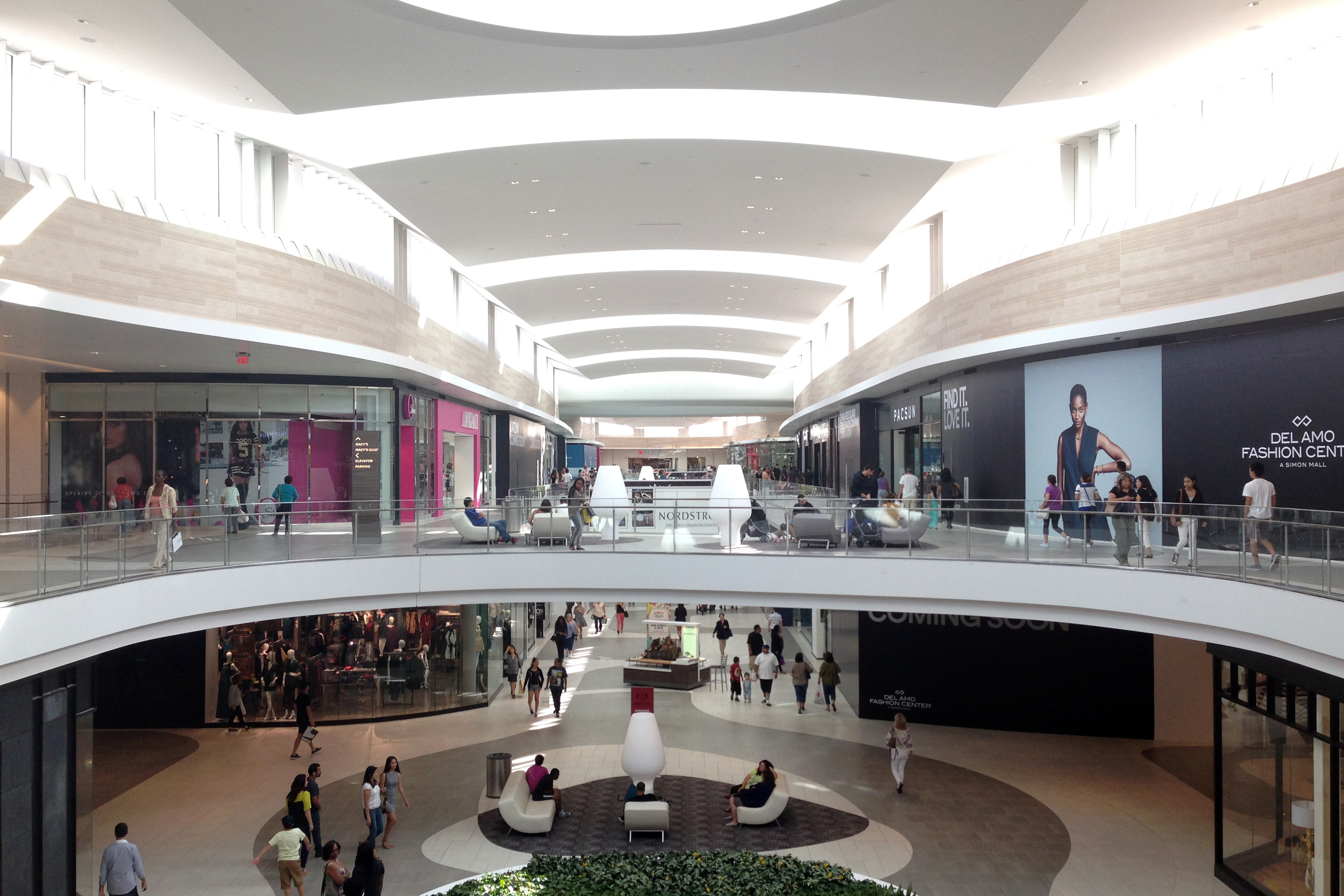
Del Amo Fashion Center, one of the largest malls in the United States

The Del Amo Fashion Center, at 2.5 million square feet (230,000 m^{2}), is one of the ten largest malls in the United States by gross leasable area. The current mall was created when Del Amo Center, built in 1958, merged with Del Amo Fashion Square, built in 1972. Once located on opposite sides of Carson Street, an expansion of the mall spanning Carson Street joined the two centers by 1982, making it the largest mall in the world at the time. In 2005, the east end of the original mall north of Carson Street was demolished to make way for a new open-air shopping center, opened in mid-September 2006. This was followed in 2015 by the opening of an expanded northern Fashion Wing, with Nordstrom as the mall anchor and supplemented by luxury retailers such as Kate Spade, Hugo Boss, Uniqlo, Michael Kors, and Ben Bridge. The Old Towne Mall was an entertainment-themed mall operating in the 1970s.

As a major oil-producing region, Torrance was once dotted with thousands of oil wells and oil derricks. Though the oil wells are not as common as they once were, the Torrance oil refinery owned by PBF Energy in the north end of the city is responsible for much of Southern California's gasoline supply. Torrance was an important hub and shop site of the Pacific Electric Railway.

Torrance has a general aviation airport, originally named simply "Torrance Airport" and since renamed Zamperini Field after local track star, World War II hero and Torrance High graduate Louis Zamperini. The airport handles approximately 175,000 annual take-offs and landings (473 per day), down from the 1974 record of 428,000 operations. Airport noise abatement is a major local issue.

Torrance is also home to the main bakery facility for King's Hawaiian, the dominant brand of Hawaiian bread in North America. Younger Optics, Torrance's 10th-largest employer, created the first seamless or "invisible" bifocal.

The headquarters of Mitsuwa Marketplace and Nijiya Market are both located in Torrance.

=== Operations of foreign companies ===
All Nippon Airways operates its United States headquarters, a customer relations and services office, in Torrance.

The Toyota Motor Company of Japan established a U.S. headquarters on October 31, 1957, at a former Rambler dealership in Hollywood. Toyota sold 287 Toyopet Crowns and one Land Cruiser during the company's first year of U.S. operation. It moved Toyota Motor Sales USA operations to Torrance in 1982, because of easy access to port facilities and the LAX airport. In 2013, it sold 2.2 million vehicles in the U.S. In 2014, it announced it would move 3,000 of its white-collar employees to Plano, Texas to be closer to its American factories. Numerous other Japanese firms followed Toyota to Los Angeles, because of its location and its reputation as the national trend-setter.

The Los Angeles South Bay area, as of 2014, has the largest concentration of Japanese companies in the United States.

== Arts and culture ==
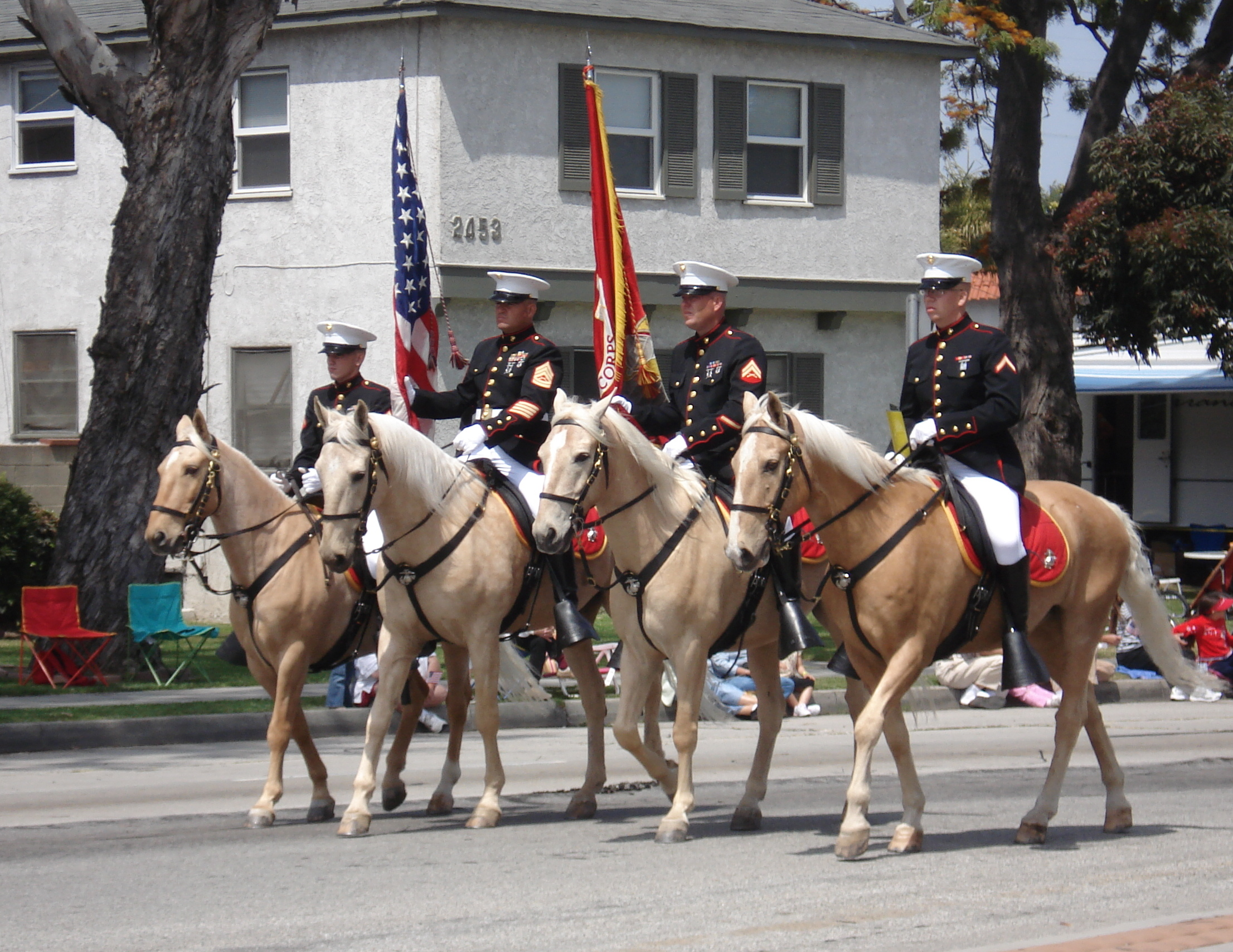
The Torrance Armed Forces Day Parade, with a USMC unit

The Armed Forces Day Parade in Torrance, which was first produced in 1960, is the longest-running military parade sponsored by a city. It is held annually on Armed Forces Day, and runs down Torrance Boulevard. The parade features military vehicles, school bands, and prominent community members.

The Torrance Cultural Arts Center hosts cultural events year-round. In partnership with the City of Torrance, the Torrance Cultural Arts Foundation (TOCA) provides diverse cultural, educational and entertainment experiences. Additional performances are provided by the Torrance Performing Arts Consortium, including The Aerospace Players, Torrance Art Museum, Los Cancioneros Master Chorale, South Bay Ballet, South Bay Conservatory, and The Torrance Symphony.

In the 2010 Rose Parade, City of Torrance's entry won the top Lathrop K. Leishman trophy for its Garden of Dreams float, judged as the "Most Beautiful Non-Commercial" float. In 2011, Torrance won the Tournament Volunteers' Trophy for best floral design of parade theme under 35 feet in length. In 2012, the city's entry won the Governor's Trophy for best depiction of life in California. In 2015, an entry honoring Rose Parade Grand Marshal Louis Zamperini won the Theme trophy for excellence in presenting parade theme. In 2016, the City of Torrance float won the Princess trophy for most beautiful float 35 feet and under.

=== Historic landmarks ===
These Torrance landmarks are on the National Register of Historic Places:

- Main Building (Torrance High School) – Mediterranean Revival architecture, 1917 and 1921
- Original Science Building – Current Home Economics Building (Torrance High School)
- Auditorium (Torrance High School) – Streamline Moderne, 1938
- Torrance Elementary School – Current High School Annex – Mediterranean Revival
- Pacific Electric Railroad Bridge – designed by Irving Gill, 1913

== Parks and recreation ==
=== City parks ===
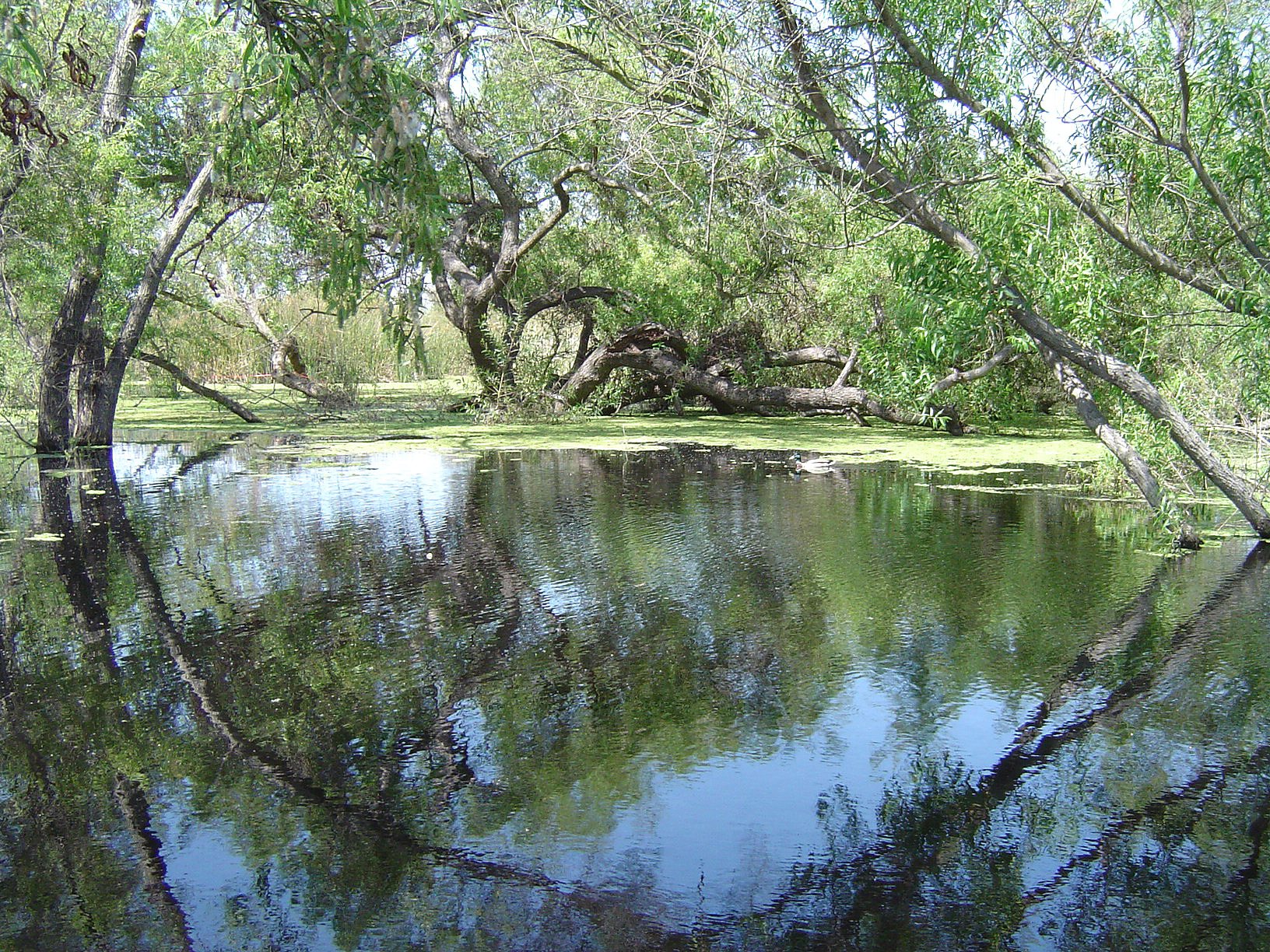
Madrona Marsh Park during springtime

The Torrance City Parks Department directs and maintains the thirty Torrance City Parks. They include:

- Wilson Park – the 44 acres (0.18 km^{2}) park has picnic and sports facilities, including a gymnasium, skatepark, and roller-hockey rink. Wilson Park also hosts the Torrance Farmers Market.
  - The Southern California Live Steamers Miniature Railroad is located at the Southeast corner of Charles H. Wilson Park. Free train rides on actual miniature live steam trains are given on the first Sunday and third Saturday of each month and the 4th of July. SCLS was one of the first live steam clubs in California started in 1946 with original members like Walt Disney, Olie Johnston and Ward Kimball all of Disney fame. The club moved to Torrance in 1986 after leaving the Lomita Railway Museum property.
- Madrona Marsh Wildlife Preserve & Nature Center – a rare Southern California wetlands habitat with higher Coastal sage community native plants areas, wildlife and birdwatching, and a Nature center with natural gardens classes.
- Columbia Park – the large recreational urban regional park has picnic areas, field sports facilities, walking paths, jogging trails, and a competitive cross country running racecourse. The cherry blossom tree grove, part of Living Tree Dedication program, is in Columbia Park.
- Torrance Smart Gardening Center – Columbia Park features a Community Garden providing planting beds and "community" for residents. It is one of twelve county-operated Smart Gardening Centers around the region. Columbia Park additionally serves as home to the Home Garden Learning Center, and is a backyard composting demonstration center provided by Los Angeles County.
- Living Tribute Trees park program – The Torrance Parks Living Dedication Tree Program is coordinated and by the city, so that families, individuals, and groups can sponsor the planting of a new tree in the park to honor a person or commemorate an event with a living tribute Tree Dedication.
- Torrance Beach Park, and the beach along the Pacific Coast of Torrance, known as "RAT Beach".
- Marvin Braude Bike Trail (The Strand), a paved bicycle path that runs mostly along the Pacific Ocean shoreline in Los Angeles County, ends there.

== Government ==
=== Local government ===
The City of Torrance is a charter city. The original city charter was voted on and ratified by the qualified electors at an election held August 20, 1946, and filed with the Secretary of State January 7, 1947. The elective officers of the city are the mayor, six members of the City Council, five members of the Board of Education, the City Clerk and the City Treasurer.

Using the council-manager form of government, the City Council, as the elected body, adopts legislation, sets policy, adjudicates issues, and establishes the budget of the city. The City Council appoints the City Manager and the City Attorney. The city has 13 appointed boards and commissions which advise the council on matters of concern to local residents, such as the city airport, arts, parks, and libraries.

=== State and federal representation ===
In the California State Senate, Torrance is split between the 24th senatorial district, represented by Democrat Ben Allen, and the 35th senatorial district, represented by Democrat Laura Richardson. In the California State Assembly, it is in the 66th Assembly district, represented by Democrat Al Muratsuchi.

In the United States House of Representatives, Torrance is split between California's 36th congressional district, represented by Democrat Ted Lieu, and California's 43rd congressional district, represented by Democrat Maxine Waters.

=== Postal service ===
The United States Postal Service operates the Torrance Post Office at 2510 Monterey Street, the Marcelina Post Office at 1433 Marcelina Avenue, the Walteria Post Office at 4216 Pacific Coast Highway, the North Torrance Post Office at 18080 Crenshaw Boulevard, and the Del Amo Post Office at 291 Del Amo Fashion Square. Zip codes 90277, 90501, 90503, 90504, 90505.

=== Healthcare ===
There are two major hospitals in Torrance: Torrance Memorial Medical Center and Little Company of Mary Hospital. A third hospital, Los Angeles County Department of Health Services Harbor-UCLA Medical Center, lies just outside the city limits (in unincorporated West Carson).

The Los Angeles County Department of Health Services operates the Torrance Health Center in Harbor Gateway, Los Angeles.

=== Fire ===
- Torrance Fire Department staffs seven Engine Companies, five Paramedic Rescue Squads, and two Truck Companies. The department operates out of six Fire Stations providing Fire and EMS coverage for the City and Mutual Aid to the surrounding communities. Torrance Memorial Medical Center, Little Company of Mary Hospital, Harbor-UCLA Medical Center, Kaiser Hospital-South Bay, and Memorial Hospital of Gardena are receiving hospitals for residents in Torrance who call 911 for medical assistance. The department is a Class 1 rated Fire Department, the Fire Chief is Martin Serna. Ambulance transportation is provided through McCormick Ambulance.

=== Police ===
- Torrance Police Department provides 24-hour law enforcement coverage to the city. The department is broken down into four major divisions, each with its own subdivisions. The department has one main station located at the Civic Center near City Hall. It houses the administrative offices, the city jail, and the public safety dispatch center. The department works closely with other local law enforcement agencies for training and SWAT operations. The police chief is Bob Dunn.
- Torrance operates its own 911 dispatch center located at the police station, and is responsible for all 911 calls originating in Torrance. The communications center answers emergency and non-emergency calls and requests for assistance in addition to dispatching for both the Fire and Police Departments.

=== Public library ===
The City of Torrance operates a main library facility (named after former mayor Katy Geissert) in the city Civic Center, as well as the North Torrance, Southeast, Walteria, El Retiro, and Isabel Henderson branch libraries.

== Transportation ==
Zamperini Field is a general aviation airport. Commercial airlines service is within 15 minutes at Los Angeles International Airport and Long Beach Airport.

Highways and freeways in the region include I-110, I-405, SR 91, SR 107, and SR 1. The city is served by Torrance Transit, LACMTA Metro bus, and LADOT services.

=== Rail ===
Union Pacific currently operates what is left of the Pacific Electric's San Pedro via Gardena Line and Torrance Loop Line both built in 1911 (passenger service was provided until 1940, afterwards only the Torrance shop train was operated for employees). The Pacific Electric Torrance Shops were completed in 1918 and closed in 1955 two years after all passenger service was taken over by Los Angeles Metropolitan Transit Authority. Freight operations were taken over by PE's parent company, Southern Pacific, in 1965. SP was merged into UP in 1996.

The Los Angeles County Metropolitan Transportation Authority (LA Metro) plans to complete the K Line Extension to Torrance of their Metro Rail system from Redondo Beach sometime between 2030 and 2033, though there are plans to accelerate the project as part of the Twenty-eight by '28 initiative so it can be done by the 2028 Olympics.

Freight to Torrance is served by BNSF and Union Pacific. BNSF operates on the former Atchison, Topeka & Santa Fe Railway Harbor Subdivision line originally built in the 1920s. AT&SF was merged with Burlington Northern in 1996 to form BNSF.

=== Proposed metro expansion ===
There have been proposals to expand the LA Metro to Torrance, but these proposals have faced opposition by Torrance politicians. In 2023, members of the Torrance City Council, Aurelio Mattucci and Jon Kaji, sought to block the expansion, arguing that the Metro would bring crime and homelessness to Torrance. Metro approved an extension of the K line from El Segundo to the Torrance Transit Center via the K line in January 2026.

== Education ==
=== Primary and secondary schools ===
==== Public schools ====
Torrance Unified School District (TUSD) was established in 1947 and unified in 1948. The district comprises the City of Torrance, bordered by the Palos Verdes Peninsula on the south, the cities of Redondo Beach and Gardena on the north, the City of Los Angeles (Harbor Gateway) on the east and the Pacific Ocean on the west. The district's jurisdiction covers approximately 21 square miles (54 km^{2}), and it operates 17 elementary schools, eight middle schools, five high schools (one of which is a continuation school), three adult education centers, and a child development center.

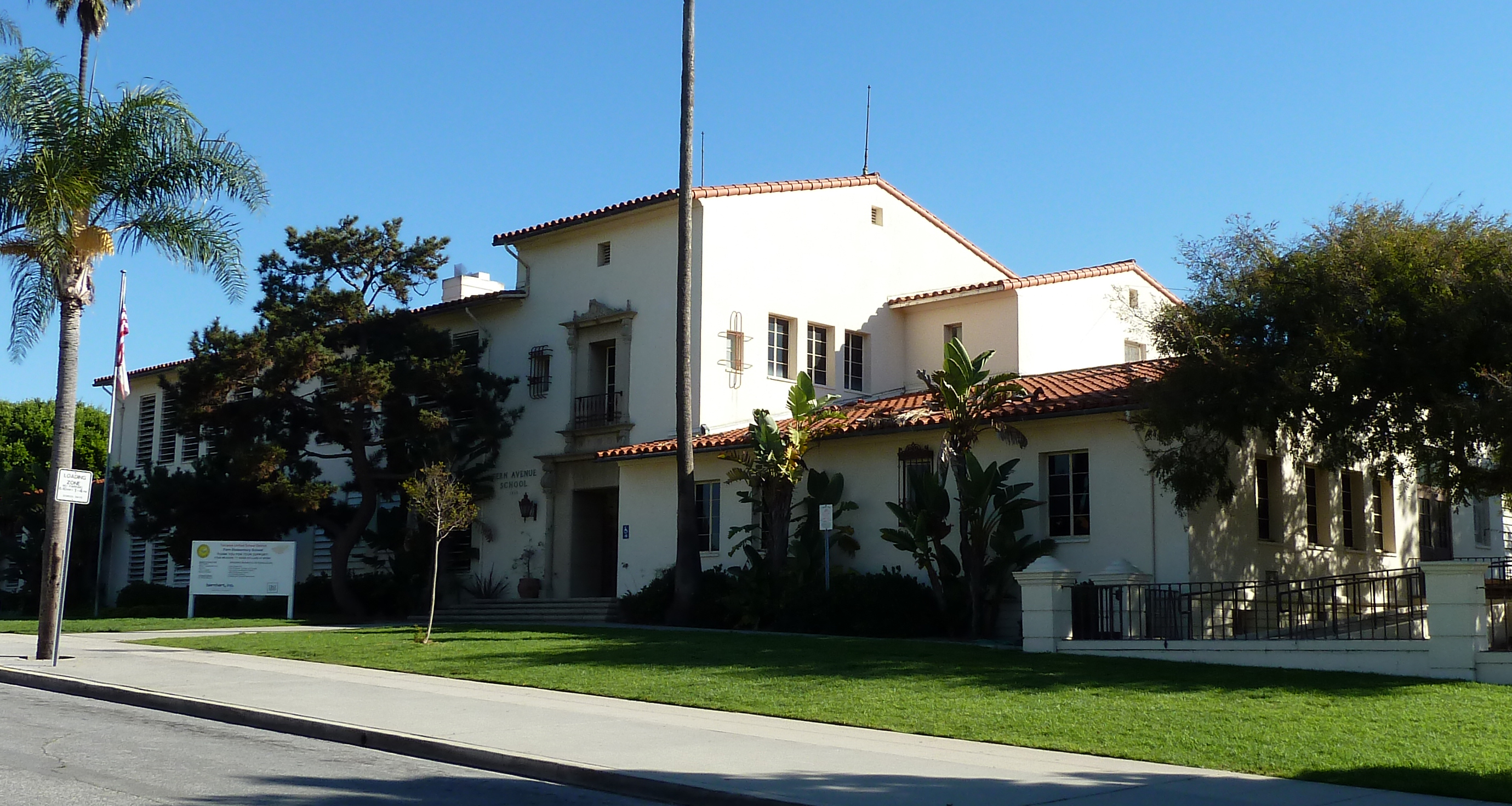
Fern Elementary School

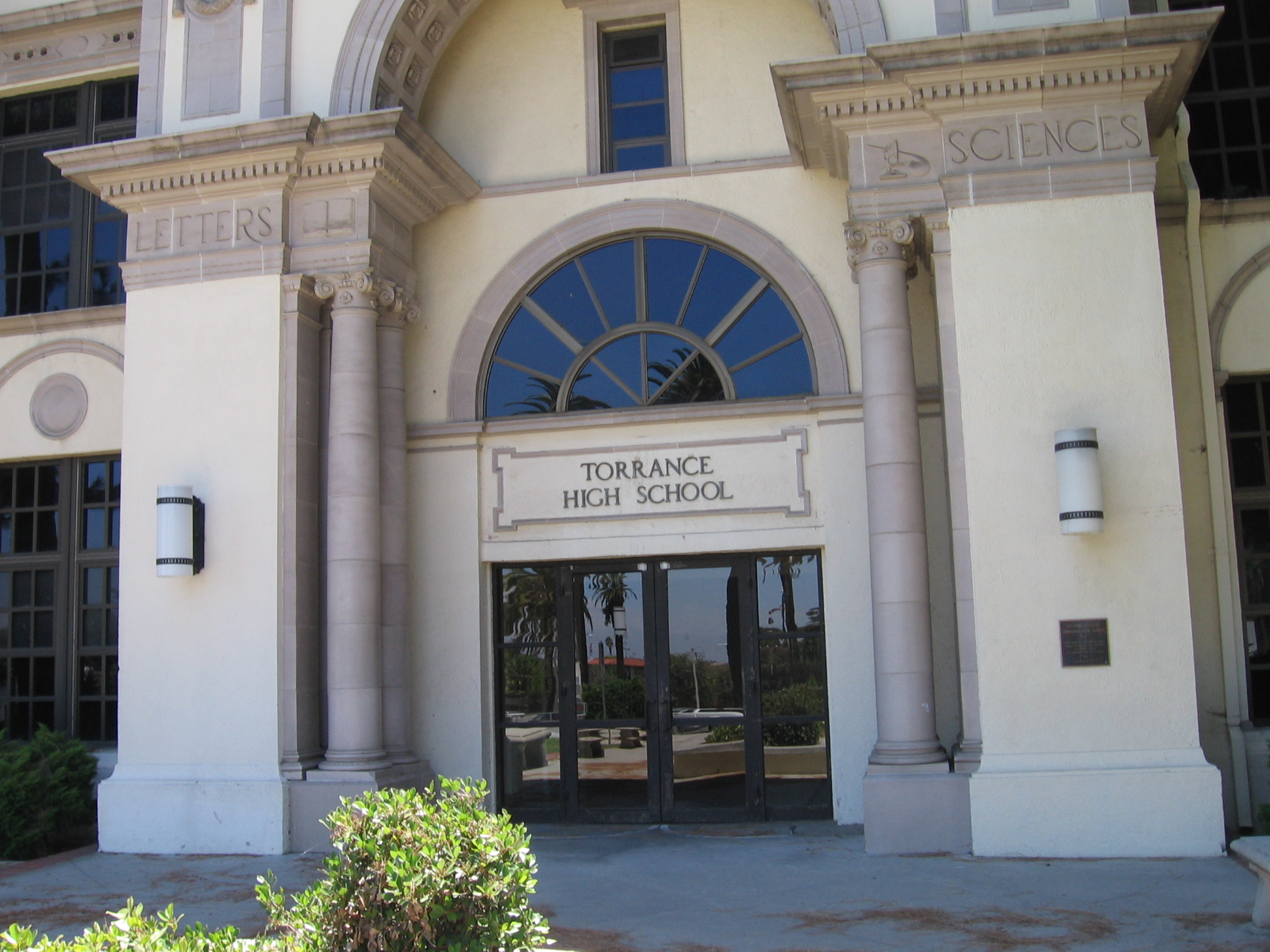
Torrance High School is one of the oldest high schools in California, having opened in 1917. The school is a popular filming location.

The Torrance Unified School District's five high schools are:

- Torrance High School
- North High School
- South High School
- West High School
- Kurt Shery High School (continuation)

The Torrance Unified School District's eight middle schools are:

- Calle Mayor Middle School
- Casimir Middle School
- Bert Lynn Middle School
- J.H. Hull Middle School
- Jefferson Middle School
- Madrona Middle School
- Philip Magruder Middle School
- Richardson Middle School

The Torrance Unified School District's 17 elementary schools are:

- Hickory Elementary School
- John Adams Elementary School
- Torrance Elementary School
- Howard Wood Elementary School
- Anza Elementary School
- Arlington Elementary School
- Arnold Elementary School
- Carr Elementary School
- Yukon Elementary School
- Walteria Elementary School
- Riviera Elementary School
- Towers Elementary School
- Fern Elementary School
- Edison Elementary School
- Lincoln Elementary School
- Seaside Elementary School
- Victor Elementary School

Area districts have created the Southern California Regional Occupational Center (SCROC) to teach technical classes to their students and to local adults. TUSD is a participant feeder district of the California Academy of Mathematics and Science or CAMS, a mathematics and science magnet high school, administered by the Long Beach Unified School District.

==== Private schools ====
Torrance also has several private schools. Catholic schools under the Roman Catholic Archdiocese of Los Angeles include Bishop Montgomery High School, Nativity Catholic School, St James Catholic School and St Catherine Laboure Catholic School. Protestant private schools include Ascension Lutheran School and First Lutheran School.

In 1980 the Lycée Français de Los Angeles bought the 6.2-acre (2.5 ha) former Parkway School property, located in the Hollywood Riviera section of Torrance, from TUSD. This property became the Lycee's Torrance campus, and as of February 1990 the campus had 100 students. In November 1989 the Lycee sold the property for $2.65 million to Manhattan Holding Co. and scheduled to transfer the students to its West Los Angeles campuses. As of February 1990 neighbors of the campus site were asking the City of Torrance to not modify the zoning of this property. The Lycee stated that the campus closed due to low enrollment.

At one time, Coast Christian Schools (now Valor Christian Academy) maintained a high school campus in Torrance.

=== Colleges and universities ===
Torrance is in the El Camino Community College District. The campus El Camino College is mostly outside the city limits in unincorporated Alondra Park, while a portion is in the Torrance City limits. El Camino College was founded in 1947, and the campus covers 126 acres (0.51 km^{2}). As of 2011, the college enrolls over 25,000 students each semester.

== Media ==
The Los Angeles Times is the metropolitan area's newspaper.

The Daily Breeze, a 70,000-circulation daily newspaper, is published in Torrance. It serves the South Bay cities of Los Angeles County. Its slogan is "LAX to LA Harbor". Herald Publications, media group started the Torrance Tribune, a community newspaper, which was started November 2010, it has a distribution of 15,000 newspapers to single-family homes and businesses in the City of Torrance.

Torrance CitiCABLE, shown on KNET 25.2, Spectrum 3, Frontier FiOS 31 is the government access channel. Programming includes news, sports, entertainment, information, public affairs, and city council meetings.

== Notable people ==
- Jason "Wee-Man" Acuña, TV host and actor
- Cole Tomas Allen, perpetrator in the 2026 White House Correspondents' Dinner shooting
- Memo Arzate, soccer player
- Bela Bajaria, Netflix Chief Content Officer, Time 100 Most Influential People (2022); attended Torrance High
- Danny Barber, serial killer executed in Texas in 1999
- Brian Bonsall, actor in Blank Check (1994 Disney film)
- Jonathan Bornstein, soccer player
- John Butler, leader of the John Butler Trio
- Brandon Call, actor on Step by Step
- Larry Carlton, guitarist
- John Chiang, California State Controller
- Kraig Chiles, soccer player
- Gil Cisneros, U.S. representative for California and Under Secretary of Defense for Personnel and Readiness
- Roger Clinton, half-brother of President Bill Clinton
- Chuck Codd, soccer player and coach
- Chase d'Arnaud, former Major League Baseball player
- Peter Daut, news anchor, KCBS-TV
- Rosemary Decamp, actress
- Chris Demaria, former MLB pitcher for the Royals and Brewers
- Bo Derek, actress
- Michael Dudikoff, actor
- Bobby East, NASCAR driver
- Ryan Ellis, NASCAR driver
- Whitney Engen, player for the United States women's national soccer team
- Carla Esparza, mixed martial artist; former UFC strawweight champion
- Stephanie Hsu, actress
- Albert Isen, first directly elected mayor
- Kellen Goff, voice actor
- Ben Going, YouTube celebrity
- Tony Gonzalez, retired tight end for the Atlanta Falcons; 11-time Pro Bowl selection
- Rorion Gracie & Royce Gracie, mixed martial arts practitioners and UFC fighters
- Bart Johnson, retired MLB pitcher
- Parnelli Jones, USAC driver and his son, P. J. Jones, IRL driver
- Spike Jonze, director, producer, screenwriter and actor; part owner of skateboard company Girl Skateboards
- Fred Kendall, former MLB catcher and manager
- Jason Kendall, former MLB catcher
- Dave Kerman, drummer
- Chloe Kim, professional snowboarder, 2018 Winter Olympics gold medalist
- Kevin Kim, professional tennis player
- Jennifer Kita, Angel/Lil Angel of the Harajuku Girls
- Alix Klineman (born 1989), volleyball player
- Scott Kolden, actor
- Michelle Kwan, 5-time world champion figure skater and United States ambassador to Belize from 2022 to 2025
- Dave LaRoche, former MLB pitcher; father of MLB players Adam LaRoche and Andy LaRoche
- Jennifer Lee (TOKiMONSTA), electronic music producer and DJ
- Ted Lieu, Democratic Party, U.S. Representative for California's 33rd congressional district
- Ted Lilly, retired MLB starting pitcher
- Jeremy Lin, professional basketball player
- Nancy Lopez, Hall of Fame professional golfer
- Joyce Manor, emo/punk band
- Brandon Manumaleuna, NFL tight end for the Chicago Bears
- Rami Malek, actor
- Antonio Margarito, Mexican-American professional boxer
- Francisco Mendoza, MLS player
- Alyson and Amanda Michalka (Aly & AJ), singers and actresses
- Justin Miller, MLB pitcher
- Ethan Moreau, former Los Angeles Kings hockey player
- Lisa Moretti, WWE's "Ivory"
- Chad Morton, NFL player
- Johnnie Morton, former NFL player
- Paul Moyer, television news broadcaster
- George Nakano, California politician
- Don Newcombe, former Los Angeles Dodgers pitcher; first winner of Rookie of the Year, MVP, and Cy Young awards
- Steve Nguyen, director, producer, and screenwriter
- Chuck Norris, karate expert and actor; raised in Torrance; opened his first dojo in Torrance
- Amy Okuda, actress
- Brian Ortega, mixed martial artist
- the Pedregon family, professional drag racers Frank Sr., Cruz, Frank Jr., and Tony
- Greg Popovich, founder and owner of Castle Rock Winery
- Jolene Purdy, actress, best known for role in Under the Dome as Dodee
- Latrice Royale, drag queen; best known for competing on the fourth season of RuPaul's Drag Race and the fourth season of RuPaul's Drag Race All Stars
- Daryl Sabara & Eve Sabara, actors (Spy Kids and Keeping Up with the Steins)
- Adán Sánchez, Mexican-American corrido singer
- Steve Sarkisian, Current head football coach at the University of Texas at Austin
- Sigi Schmid, LA Galaxy head coach
- Skip Schumaker, MLB outfielder
- Justin Shenkarow, actor
- Bud Smith, retired MLB player; threw no-hitter in his rookie season (2001)
- Snoop Dogg, rapper, actor; owns mansion in Hollywood Riviera neighborhood
- Joe Stevenson, mixed martial arts practitioner and UFC fighter
- Jack Stewart, soccer player, Carolina RailHawks in USL-1
- Royle Stillman, MLB outfielder
- William Suff, serial killer
- Quentin Tarantino, filmmaker
- Ron Taylor, film and television actor, pro basketball player (ABA and Austrian League)
- Tyrone Taylor, center fielder for the New York Mets
- Deon Thompson, North Carolina Tar Heels basketball player
- Connor Tingley, artist
- Billy Traber, Major League Baseball pitcher
- Tiffany van Soest, kickboxer
- Janeene Vickers, 1992 Barcelona Olympics medalist
- Chauncey Washington, former NFL running back
- Glen Walker, NFL player
- J. Warner Wallace, homicide detective and Christian apologist
- David Wells, former MLB pitcher
- Paul Westphal, NBA player and former head coach
- Ryan Wheeler, MLB third baseman
- Denzel Whitaker, actor
- John White, CFL player
- Justine Wong-Orantes, volleyball player and two-time Olympic medalist, awarded "Best Libero" at the 2020 Summer Olympics
- Steven Wright, starting pitcher for Boston Red Sox
- Viviana Villacorta, soccer player
- Louis Zamperini, 1936 Olympic track star, World War II veteran, author, speaker; subject of Unbroken

== Sister cities ==
In 1973, Torrance established a sister-city relationship with Kashiwa, Chiba, Japan, as part of the Sister Cities International program. Since then, citizens of Torrance have regularly engaged in cultural exchange with Kashiwa through the guidance of the Torrance Sister City Association, which facilitates a Japanese cultural festival, a yearly student exchange program, and contact between officials of the two cities. North High is the official sister high school of Kashiwa Municipal High. Torrance has also had a sister-city relationship with Konya, Turkey since 1958.

== See also ==
- List of cities in Los Angeles County, California
