= Skate sailing =

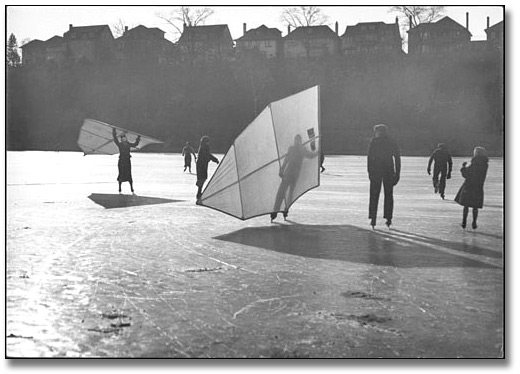
Canadian people skate sailing, [1933] John H. Boyd

Skate sailing is a method of moving over ice standing on ice skates utilizing the force of the wind. A small sail is held in ones hands or leaned against with the whole body. Using a metal blade under foot and the height of the ice skates is of much importance in being able to steer as much it is acquiring the technique to gain an edge.

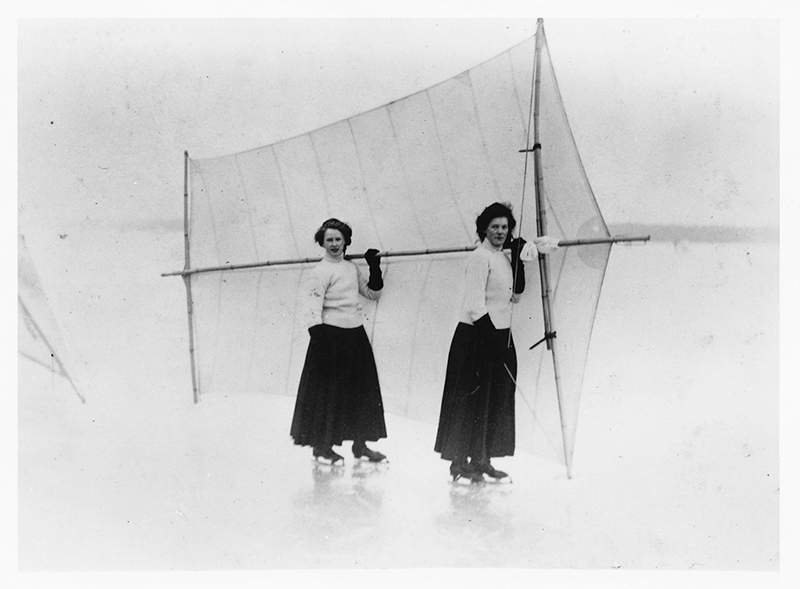
Skate sailing in Sweden, 1905–1915.

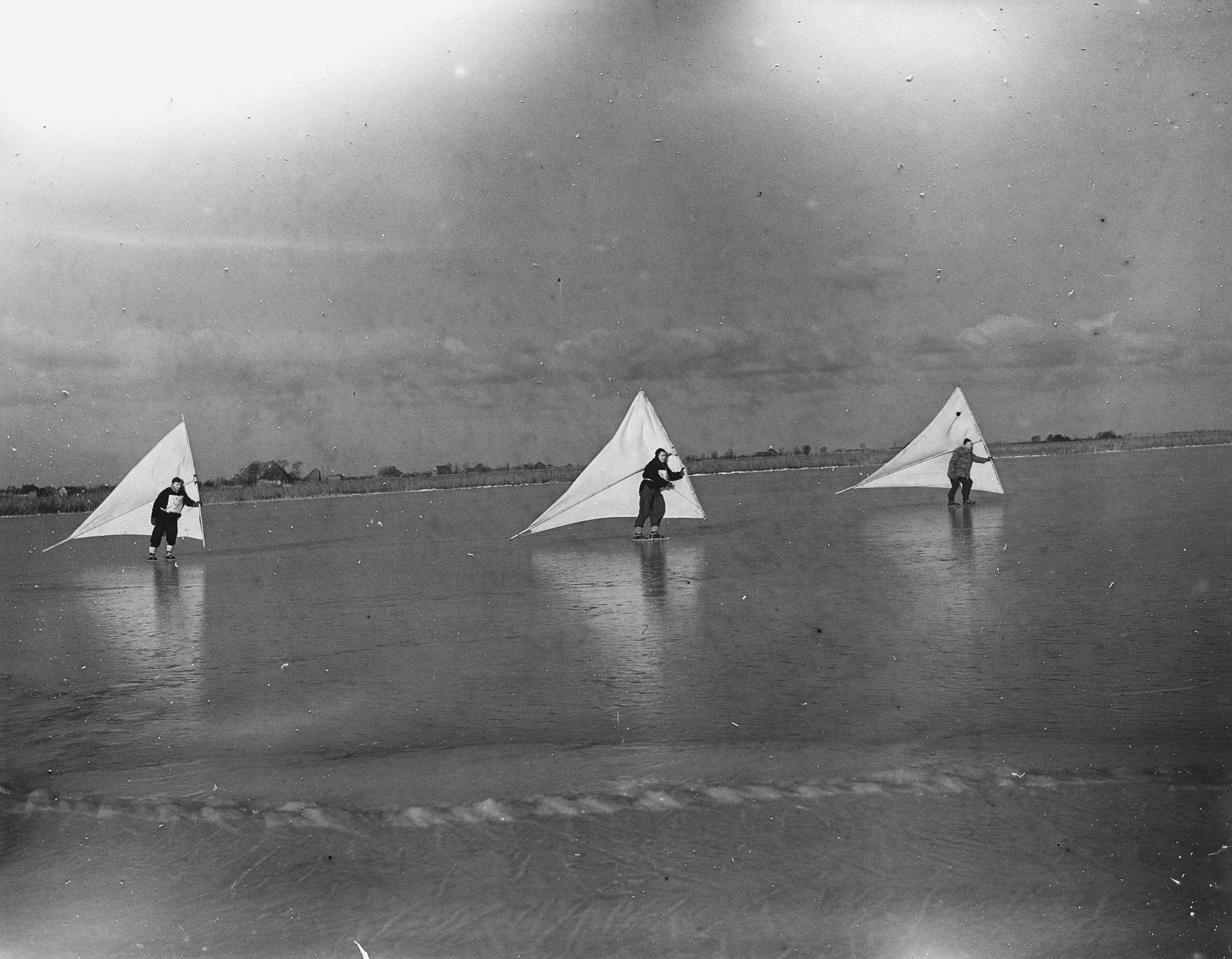
Skate sailing in the Netherlands, 1954

Skate sailing is a windsport with a long tradition, probably as old as ice skates themselves. It is distinct from land-based Wind skating, which is inspired by Windsurfing and commonly makes use of a skateboard or inline skates.

Skate sailing is using a sail and the wind to propel oneself across any relatively flat, hard surface. Skate sailing can be done in summer on roller blades, roller skis, cross skates, etc. Winter sailing can be enjoyed on downhill skis, snow blades, ice skates, or any other sliding footwear.
