= West High School (Torrance, California) =

Location
- 20401 Victor Street; Torrance, California 90503; United States; 33°50′47″N 118°22′2″W

Information
- Type: Public school
- Established: September 4, 1962; 64 years ago
- School district: Torrance Unified School District
- Principal: Jenna Murata
- Teaching staff: 71.81 (FTE)
- Grades: 9–12
- Enrollment: 1,775 (2024-25)
- Student to teacher ratio: 24.72
- Colors: Brown and gold
- Athletics: Football, flag football, baseball, softball, basketball, wrestling, soccer, volleyball, beach volleyball, swimming, water polo, track and field, cross country, tennis, golf, badminton
- Athletics conference: CIF Southern Section; Pioneer League
- Nickname: Warriors
- Publication: Signals
- Website: whs.tusd.org

West High School is a public high school in Torrance, California, United States. The mascot is the Warrior. It is a part of the Torrance Unified School District.

== History ==
West High serves the area bounded by 190th Street, Hawthorne Boulevard, Sepulveda Boulevard and the Redondo Beach border. The school colors are brown and gold.

The school was established in 1962, the last of three new TUSD high schools built in the 50s and 60s, in response to the postwar baby boom. It followed the additions of North High (1955) and South High (1957). Architect Roy Donley was hired to design the campus in 1958, which now spans 39.5 acres. Overall cost for the new school was put at $5 million.

In 2011, West High renamed its football facility Fred Peterson Stadium, in honor of the late longtime football coach who won a CIF football title in 1982 and founded the school's girls track-and-field program.

== Recognition ==
West High has been named a California Distinguished School five times, in 1994, 1999, 2005, 2013, and 2019.

West was designated a National Blue Ribbon School in 1984 by the US Department of Education, and was named a Gold Ribbon School in 2015. West was also recognized as a CA Exemplary Program in Arts Education School in 2019.

The school won the Los Angeles County Academic Decathlon in 2019.

== Demographics ==
The demographic breakdown of the 1,775 students enrolled for the 2024–2025 school year was:

- Male - 52.9%
- Female - 47.1%

Ethnic Composition
Ethnicity	Percentage
Native American/Native Alaskan	0.3%
Asian	36.9%
Black	5.4%
Hispanic	25.8%
White	20.6%
Native Hawaiian/Pacific Islander	0.3%
Multiracial	10.6%

Additionally, 24.7% of the students were eligible for free or reduced lunch.

== Notable alumni ==
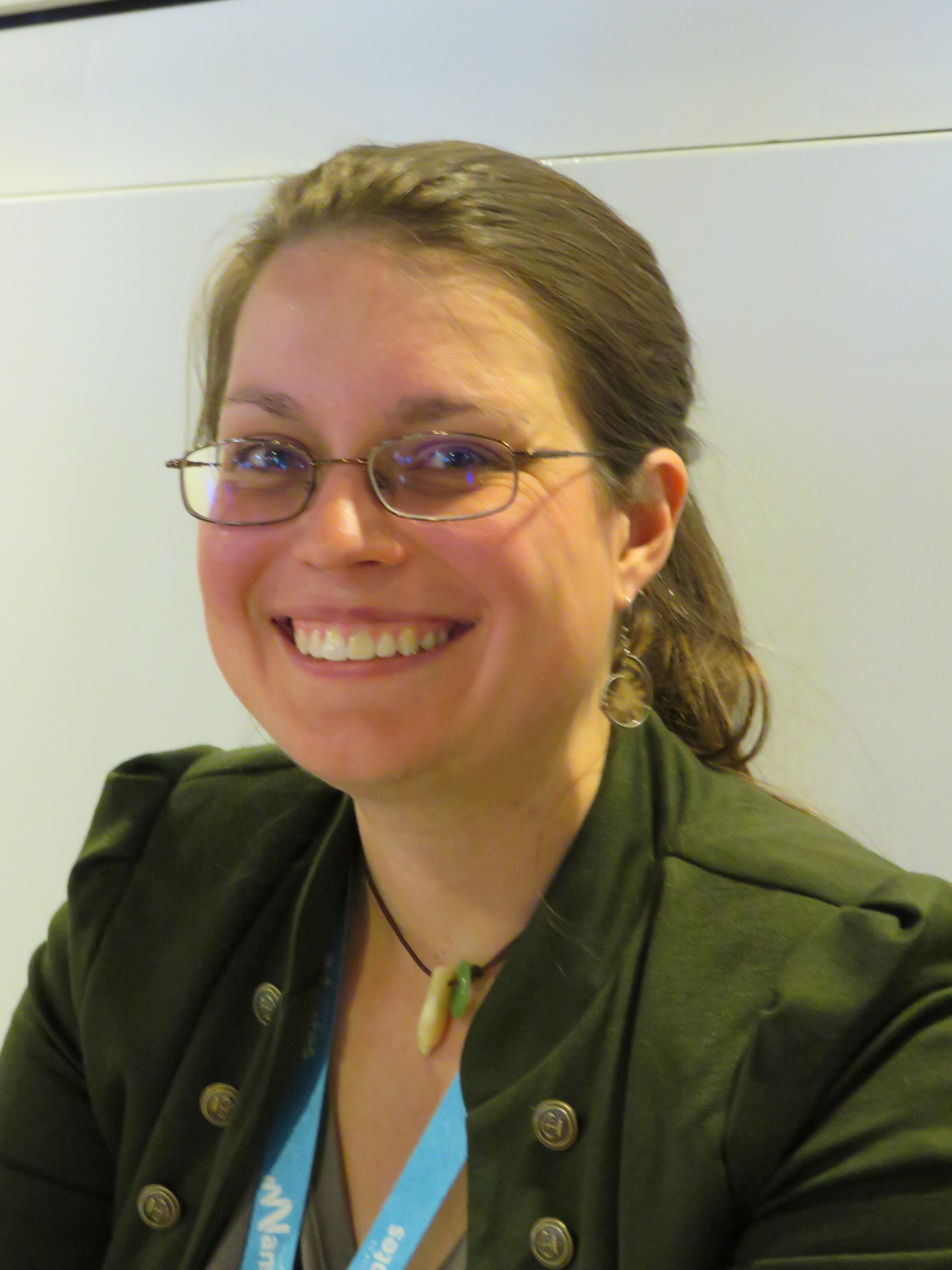
Becky Chambers, American science fiction writer

- Steve Sarkisian, football coach
- Jun Ho Bae, missionary
- Sean Berry, professional baseball player
- Becky Chambers, Hugo Award winning science fiction author
- Emily Day, volleyball player
- Rener Gracie, Brazilian jiu-jitsu practitioner
- Jason Jung, tennis player
- Dave LaRoche, MLB pitcher, Angels, Indians, Yankees, Cubs, Twins 1970-1983
- Daryl Sabara, actor
- Bob Staake, New Yorker cover artist and author/illustrator of best selling children's books
- Nick Subis, professional football player
- TOKiMONSTA, record producer and DJ, Grammy nominated in 2019 for Best Dance / Electronic Album for the album Lune Rouge
- Paula Weishoff, member of the United States Olympic women's volleyball team in 1984, 1992, and 1996
- Zac McGraw, professional soccer player
- Shaun Wyvill, Professional Rugby League player
- Taylor Rashi, professional baseball player for the Arizona Diamondbacks
