= Torrance School =

- Torrance High School Annex (Torrance Elementary School 1923-1963)
- U.S. National Register of Historic Places
- Location within the Los Angeles metropolitan area Location within California Location within the United States
- Location: Torrance High School, 2200 West Carson, Torrance, California
- Coordinates: 33°49′41″N 118°19′6″W
- Area: 1 acre (0.40 ha)
- Built: 1923−1925
- Architect: Cline, E. H.
- Architectural style: Renaissance Revival
- MPS: Torrance High School Campus TR
- NRHP reference No.: 83003542
- Added to NRHP: October 13, 1983

The Torrance School, also known as Torrance High School Annex and originally as Torrance Elementary School, is located on the campus of Torrance High School in Torrance, southwestern Los Angeles County, California.

== History ==
In 1917 the Torrance School Main Building opened, housing the elementary and high school. In 1923 this Torrance Elementary School building opened on the southern side of the campus, and the original Torrance School Main Building was converted into a high school only. A new elementary school building was built off campus in 1963, and this one was annexed to the high school and renamed the Torrance High School Annex or Annex building.

The building, built over 1923 to 1925, was designed in the Renaissance Revival style. It is connected to the rest of the campus by a long curving and center−pillared Modernist arcade.

Torrance elementary schools were in the Los Angeles City School District until 1947, when they became a part of a new school district, renamed Torrance Unified School District in 1948. In 1947 the Los Angeles City School District removed the furniture from Torrance schools.

== National Register of Historic Places ==
The building was listed on the National Register of Historic Places in 1983.

The Torrance School Annex building is one of four on the Torrance High School campus listed on the NRHP, the other buildings are:

- Auditorium—Assembly Hall (1938)
- Home Economics Building (1923)
- Main Building (1917)

== See also ==
- National Register of Historic Places in Los Angeles County, California
- School buildings on the National Register of Historic Places in California
