= Sepulveda Elementary School =

Sepulveda Elementary School may refer to:

- Sepulveda Elementary School (Santa Ana, California)
- Sepulveda Elementary School (Torrance, California)
- Sepulveda Elementary School (Sparks, Nevada)
