= Fern Elementary School =

Fern Elementary School may refer to:

- Fern Elementary School, California, United States — Torrance Unified School District
- Mayor Joseph J. Fern Elementary School, Hawaii, United States — See List of elementary schools in Hawaii
