= Home Economics Building (Torrance High School) =

- U.S. National Register of Historic Places
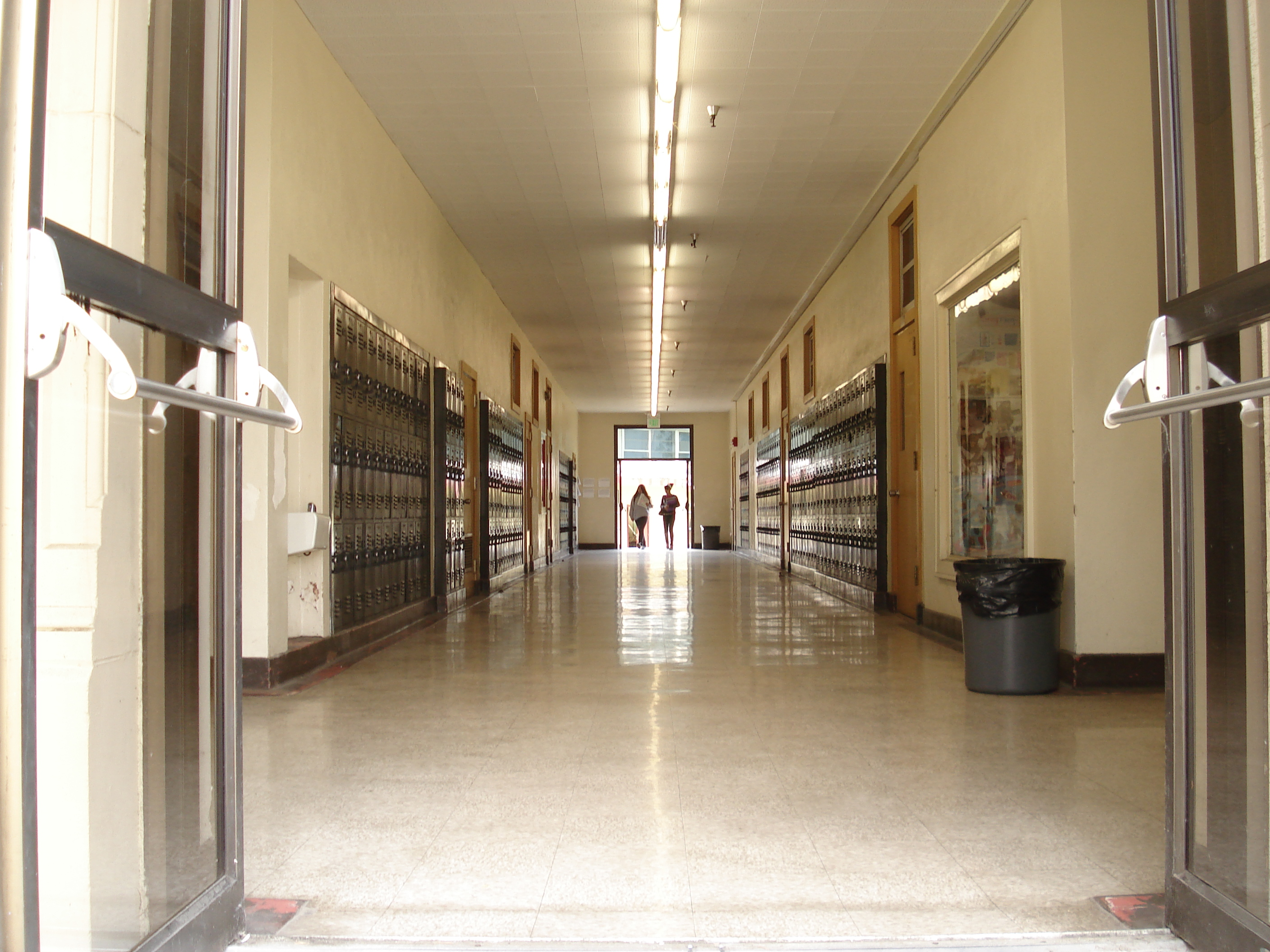

- Location within the Los Angeles metropolitan area Location within California Location within the United States
- Location: 2200 W. Carson, Torrance, California
- Coordinates: 33°49′52″N 118°19′16″W
- Area: 0.3 acres (0.12 ha)
- Built: 1923
- Architect: Farrell & Miller
- Architectural style: Late 19th and 20th Century Revivals, Mediterranean Revival
- MPS: Torrance High School Campus TR
- NRHP reference No.: 83003536
- Added to NRHP: October 13, 1983

The Home Economics Building is located on the campus of Torrance High School in Torrance, Los Angeles County, California.

It was built in 1922–1923, in the Mediterranean Revival style.

It was listed on the National Register of Historic Places in 1983. The Home Economics Building is one of four on the campus of the Torrance High School listed on the NRHP, the other buildings are:

- Auditorium
- Torrance School
- Main Building.
