= Auditorium (Torrance High School) =

- U.S. National Register of Historic Places
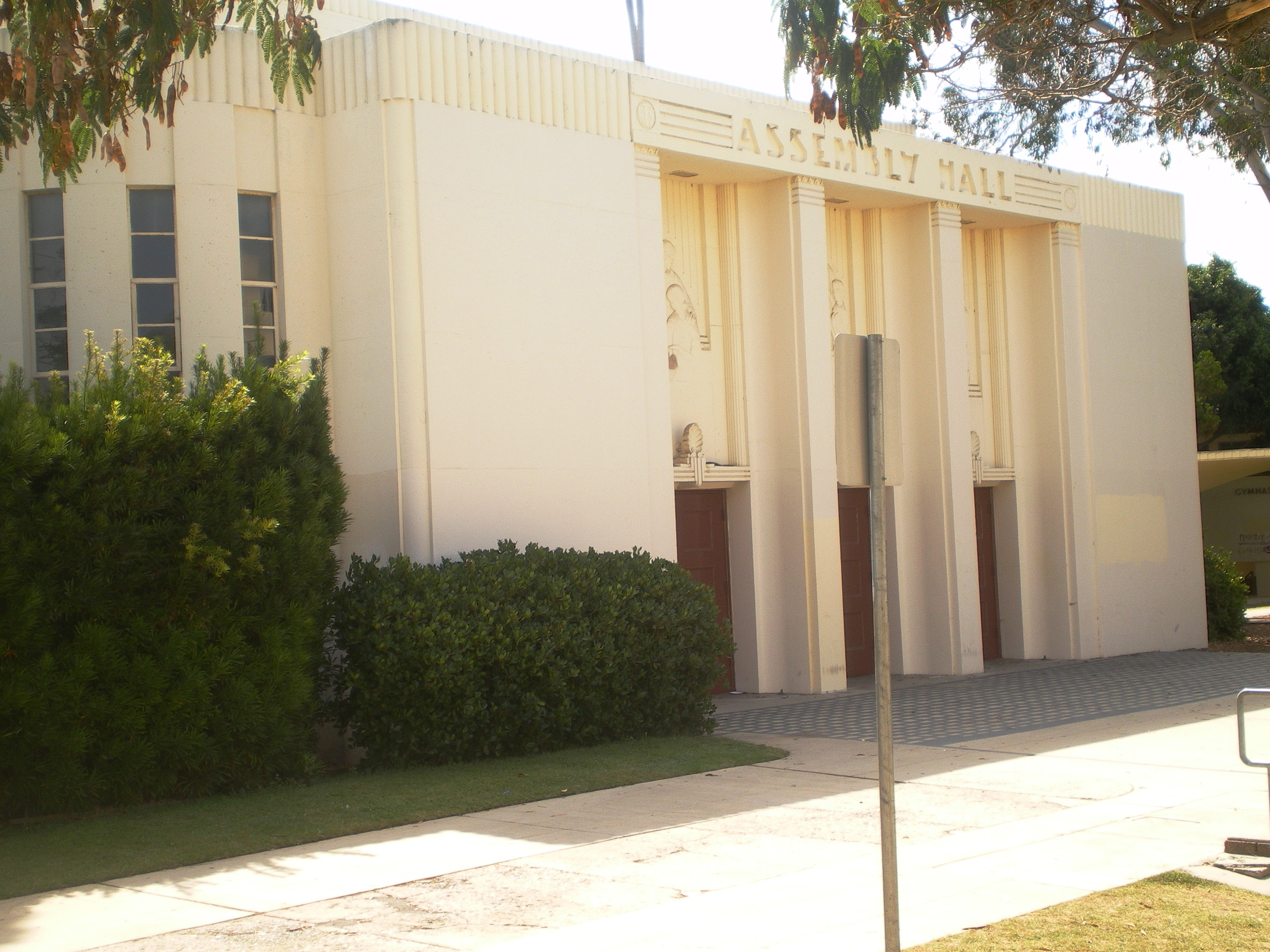

- Location within the Los Angeles metropolitan area Location within California Location within the United States
- Location: 2200 W. Carson, Torrance, California
- Coordinates: 33°49′48″N 118°19′11″W
- Area: 0.4 acres (0.16 ha)
- Built: 1938
- Architect: Abraham Wesley Eager
- Architectural style: PWA Moderne
- MPS: Torrance High School Campus TR
- NRHP reference No.: 83003499
- Added to NRHP: October 13, 1983

The Auditorium, also known as the Assembly Hall, is a PWA Moderne style building located on the campus of Torrance High School in Torrance, Los Angeles County, California.

When built in 1924 the building was a source of pride for Torrance, and was its first large meeting hall, preceding construction of a civic center. It was damaged in the 1933 Long Beach earthquake and was rebuilt as a New Deal project.

It was listed on the National Register of Historic Places in 1983.

The Torrance High School Campus Thematic Resources study states that the auditorium is an outstanding example of PWA Moderne work.

The Auditorium is one of four buildings on the campus of the Torrance High School listed on the NRHP, the other buildings are:

- Torrance School
- Main Building
- Home Economics Building
