= Main Building (Torrance High School) =

- Main Building; Torrance High School
- U.S. National Register of Historic Places
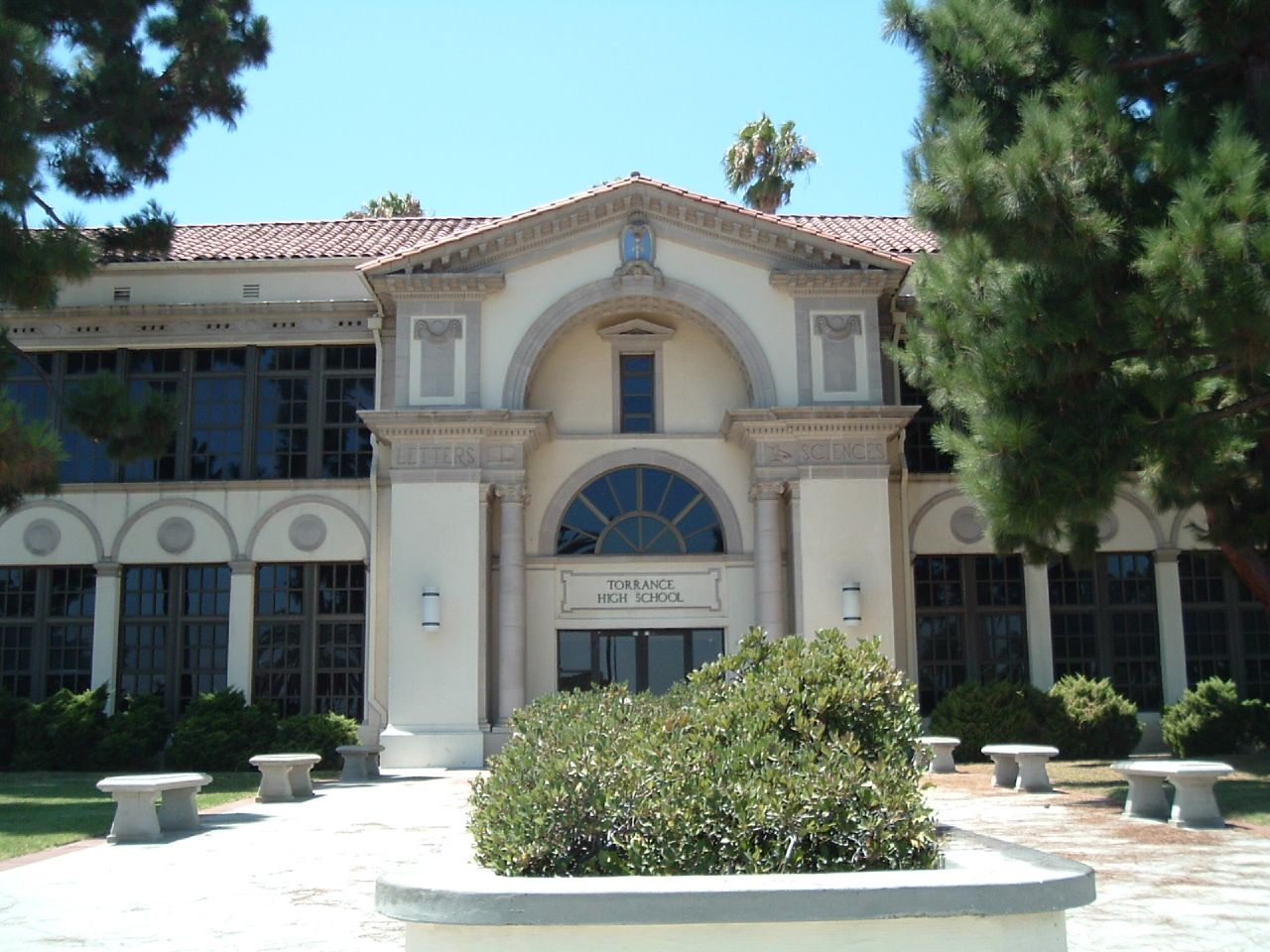
- Entrance facade and courtyard of the Main Building

- Location within the Los Angeles metropolitan area Location within California Location within the United States
- Location: Torrance High School; 2200 West Carson, Torrance, California
- Coordinates: 33°49′51″N 118°19′13″W
- Area: 0.5 acres (0.20 ha)
- Built: 1917
- Architect: Farrell, Robert Allen; Cline, E. H.
- Architectural style: Late 19th and 20th Century Revivals, Mediterranean Revival
- MPS: Torrance High School Campus TR
- NRHP reference No.: 83003538
- Added to NRHP: October 13, 1983

The Main Building of Torrance High School is located on the campus in Torrance, southwestern Los Angeles County, California. The Main Building was opened to students as Torrance School in 1917.

== History ==
On opening the "Main Building" in 1917, Torrance School accommodated both elementary and high school students in its first building. In 1923, with the opening of the new elementary school for kindergarten through sixth grade students, Torrance School was renamed Torrance High School.

Torrance elementary schools were in the Los Angeles City School District until 1947, when they transferred to a new Torrance school district. In 1947 Torrance high schools moved to the Redondo Union High School District and then became a part of the modern Torrance Unified School District in 1948.

== Architecture ==
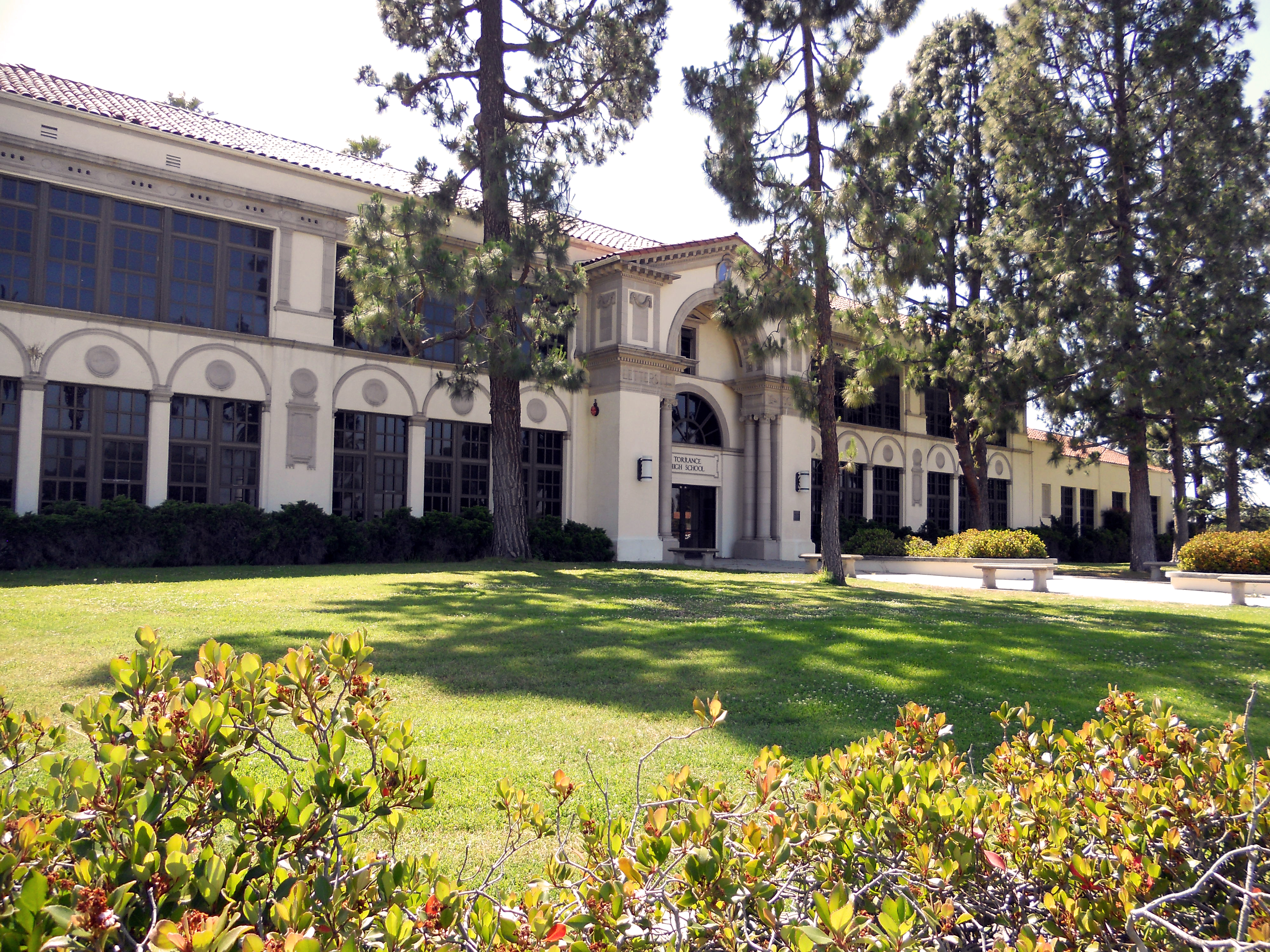
Mediterranean Revival and Classical Revival style facade of the 1917 Main Building.

The Main Building, built in 1917, was the first building on the campus, then known as the Torrance School and serving all grades. It is a two-story structure designed in the Mediterranean Revival style, and has architectural elements in the Classical Revival and Spanish Colonial Revival styles. The central two-story section is flanked by one-story wings, which all frame an outdoor courtyard patio.

The main entrance is the dominant element of the building's facade. It consists of a set of layered elements: a large pediment with a cornice, a cofferred arch, a flat window with pediment above, a large arched fanlight, and a flat doorway portal. The doorway is flanked by paired columns.

A rear addition was built in 1922, in the same style. In 1923, after the Torrance Elementary School was built on the campus, the original Torrance School Main Building was converted into a high school. The elementary school building was annexed to the high school in 1963, and was renamed the Torrance High School Annex building.

== National Register of Historic Places ==
The Main Building was listed on the National Register of Historic Places in 1983.

The Main Building is one of four on the Torrance High School campus listed on the NRHP, the other buildings are:

- Auditorium—Assembly Hall (1938)
- Home Economics Building (1923)
- Torrance High School Annex (1923−1925), originally Torrance Elementary School.

== See also ==
- National Register of Historic Places in Los Angeles County, California
- School buildings on the National Register of Historic Places in California
