= Los Angeles City High School District =

School district in California

Los Angeles City High School District (known in its last year as West County Union High School District) was a school district that served high school-aged residents of western Los Angeles County, California from 1890 to 1962. At times the district included Beverly Hills, Culver City, and Torrance.

== History ==
The district formed in 1890; it served students of the Los Angeles High School while the Los Angeles City School District and various other elementary school districts served elementary and junior high school students.

The high school district expanded its territory by annexing other high school districts and including other elementary school districts in its boundaries. In 1906, the district took the Jewell Union High School District. In 1909, the district took the Hollywood Union High School District and the San Pedro City High School District. In 1910 it took the Wilmington Union High School District. In 1913 it took the Van Nuys High School District. In 1914, it took the San Fernando Union High School District. In 1916, the Owensmouth Union High School District became a part of the Los Angeles High School District.

On August 18, 1921, Los Angeles City High School District added the territory of the following grade school districts: Alturas, Beverly Hills, Calabasas, Castaic, Cornell, Culver City, Felton, Garripatos (the district was later renamed to Topanga), Honby, Las Vergenes, Liberty, Live Oak, New Era, Newhall, San Francisquito, San Martinez and Saugus. The high school district annexed Venice Union High School District in 1925. Residents of the Palos Verdes School District, formed in 1925, were zoned to Los Angeles City High School District facilities for high school.

On July 22, 1929 the Oak Flat district territory was transferred from Antelope Valley Joint Union High School District to Los Angeles City High School District.

On July 22, 1932, the Huntington Park School District became included in the Los Angeles City High School District. On March 23, 1936, Beverly Hills left the Los Angeles City High School District and formed the Beverly Hills High School District; by operation of law this became the Beverly Hills Unified School District.

On December 29, 1942, the Bee School District was transferred from Antelope Valley Joint Union High School District to the Los Angeles City High School District. On January 25, 1945, Culver City left the Los Angeles High School District in a similar manner as Beverly Hills. On January 30, 1945, the Santa Clarita Union High School District (also known as the William S. Hart Union High School District) took the territories of the Bee, Newhall, Castaic Union and Saugus Union school districts.

In 1947, Torrance High School was transferred to the Redondo Union High School District, and the elementary schools in the City of Torrance were formed into the Torrance City School District; the latter became Torrance Unified School District the following year and took the high school.

=== Unification ===
The citizens of the Los Angeles City School District voted to become a unified school district on June 7, 1960. On July 1, 1961, it became the Los Angeles Unified School District.

Additionally, the Palos Verdes School District became the Palos Verdes Peninsula Unified School District on the same day.

The remainder of the high school district, with only the territory of the Las Vergenes Union School District and Topanga School District, and no high school, renamed itself the West County Union High School District. The new L.A. Unified was only required to provide high school service to the remaining West County district for three years. On October 3, Topanga School District citizens also voted to join L.A. Unified. Since this reduced the West County Union High School District to the same border as Las Virgenes grade school district as of July 1, 1962, the 1935 state law known as the Unification Act caused their automatic unification on that date; the resulting district took the name Las Virgenes Unified School District. Its citizens approved a bond issue and state aid authorization in the April 16, 1963 election, leading to the opening of Agoura High School, 3 years after the dissolution of the 1890 high school district.

== Schools ==
Schools on the list joined LAUSD in 1961 unless otherwise stated.

- Phineas Banning High School
- Bell High School
- Belmont High School
- Beverly Hills High School (until 1936)
- Birmingham High School
- Cleveland High School
- Susan Miller Dorsey High School
- Eagle Rock High School
- John H. Francis Polytechnic High School
- Franklin High School
- Gardena High School
- Garfield High School
- Granada Hills High School
- Grant High School
- Alexander Hamilton High School
- Hollywood High School
- Huntington Park High School
- Jefferson High School
- Jordan High School
- Abraham Lincoln High School
- Los Angeles High School
- James Monroe High School
- Manual Arts High School
- John Marshall High School
- North Hollywood High School
- Reseda High School
- San Fernando High School
- San Pedro High School
- South Gate High School
- William Howard Taft High School
- Torrance High School (until 1947)
  - Included the Main Building
- University High School
- Van Nuys High School
- Venice High School
- Verdugo Hills High School
- Washington Preparatory High School
- Woodrow Wilson High School
