= Seaside Elementary School =

- Horry County Schools#Middle Schools in South Carolina
- Torrance Unified School District#Primary schools in California
