= Fern Elementary School (California) =

Public elementary school in Torrance, California, U.S.

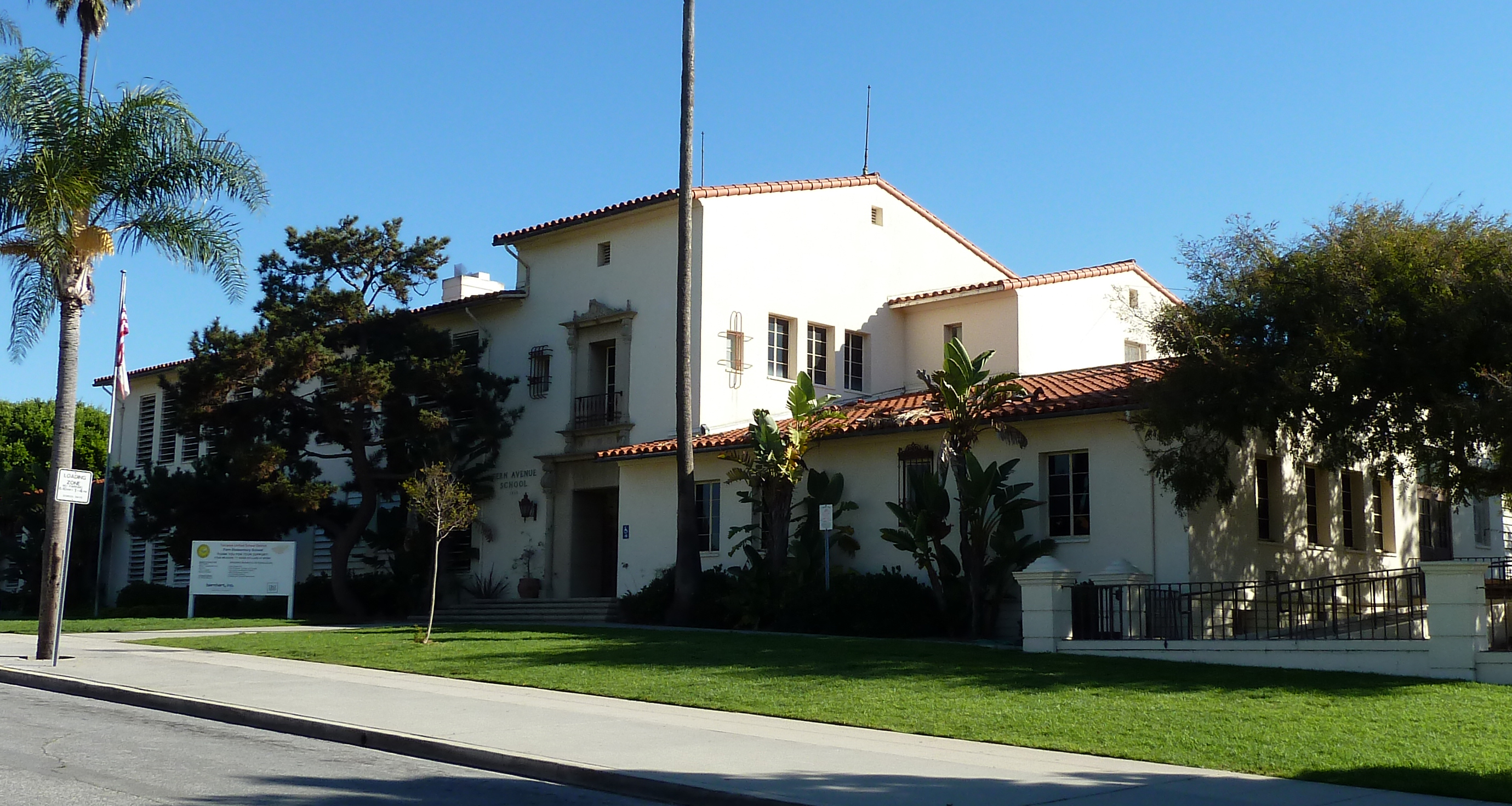
The historic Spanish Colonial Revival style Fern Elementary School.

Fern Elementary School, previously known as Fern Avenue School, is a public elementary school that is in Torrance, California, and a part of the Torrance Unified School District (TUSD). It is on the National Register of Historic Places (NRHP) as #92000067 on February 20, 1992.

As of 2003 its attendance area includes portions of Torrance west of Madrid Avenue.

== History ==
It opened as Redondo Boulevard School, then in the Los Angeles City School District, in 1926 and became Fern Avenue School in 1928. Its initial school facility was a temporary group of bungalows that became overcrowded. The LA School District chose not to build a new school, despite Torrance residents voting in favor for a school bond of that district on March 27, 1931, as it was afraid that Torrance would later secede from the school district. The Los Angeles School District changed its plans in 1932, and the current facility was built with $84,000 from the $12.7 million bond. Torrance residents pressured the district into immediately hooking the school to the sewer system instead of the initial plans for the school to use a cesspool. On January 2, 1933, the permanent school opened. It became a part TUSD in 1947. Torrance USD proposed razing the building on March 6, 1957, for fear that it would not meet earthquake standards but in March 1958 the State of California ruled that it would cost less money to retrofit the existing facility.

In 1996 TUSD put some portable classrooms on Greenwood Park to relieve Fern. They remained in use until September 2012, when a permanent $13.5 million 14-classroom addition and renovation opened. The current dining hall and a multipurpose room are in this addition.
