= All American High =

1987 documentary directed by Keva Rosenfeld

- Documentary feature film
- Directed by: Keva Rosenfeld
- Produced by: Linda Maron; Keva Rosenfeld
- Narrated by: "Rikki" Rauhala
- Distributed by: Public Broadcasting Service (PBS)
- Release date: 1987
- Running time: 59 min.
- Country: United States
- Language: English

All American High is a 1987 documentary film directed by Keva Rosenfeld that chronicles the life of the 1984 senior class at Torrance High School in Los Angeles County, California.

== Synopsis ==
The film is narrated by the Finnish exchange student “Rikki” Rauhala and observes 1980s California high school culture from a foreigner's perspective.

It chronicles the life of the 1984 senior class at Torrance High School in Los Angeles County, California.

== Production ==
The film was independently financed, with additional funds provided through an American Film Institute (AFI)−National Endowment for the Arts (NEA) grant. The film was selected for the Grand Jury Prize competition at the 1987 Sundance Film Festival. It was originally broadcast on Public Broadcasting Service (PBS).

== Sequel ==
A second documentary film about the former Torrance High senior class was directed by Keva Rosenfeld in 2014 (released in 2015), All American High Revisited. It combines the original film with new footage of the film's principal subjects being interviewed on their high school years, the process of growing up, and the various paths in life that they took.

== Critical reception ==
- People Magazine: "Keva Rosenfeld does a spectacular job of candidly capturing the life of typical suburban teens. It is true. It is hilarious. It’s a little frightening. This is one wonderfully entertaining documentary."
- LA Times, Patrick Goldstein: a “topsy-turvy blend of the innocent and the exotic.” “Startling...” and added, “rarely intrusive and never condescending.”
- Hollywood Reporter, Duane Byrge: “Fascinating, insightful, and highly entertaining.“Every bit as piercing as Fredrick Wiseman’s classic portrait “High School.”
- New York Times, Vincent Canby: “If Keva Rosenfeld’s vividly satiric All American High is to be believed, this country is headed for hell on a surfboard...”
- LA Times, Sheila Benson: “The most cheerfully terrifying movie I think I’ve ever seen.”
- Sneak Previews, Michael Medved: "A brilliantly conceived motion picture."
- The Village Voice, J. Hoberman: "Bears out Werner Herzog's observation that, although they believe they are normal, Americans are the most exotic people on earth."
- L.A. Weekly, John Powers: "A documentary that might chill you were it not so funny."

== Nominations and awards ==
- Sundance Film Festival, 1987 Nominated Grand Jury Prize, Documentary.
- International Documentary Association, “Distinguished Documentary Achievement Award” (1986).

== Festival showings ==
- London Film Festival
- Hong Kong International Film Festival, 1987
- Jerusalem Film Festival, 1987
- San Francisco International Film Festival, 1987
- New Directors/New Films Festival, Film Society of Lincoln Center, shown at NY Museum of Modern Art
- Chicago International Film Festival, 1986, Nominated Gold Hugo Award - Documentary
- Sundance Film Festival, 1987, Nominated Grand Jury Prize - Documentary

== See also ==
- Documentary films about education in the United States
- Films set in Los Angeles County, California
- Torrance, California topics
