= Ted T. Tanouye =

Japanese American soldier in the United States Army

Ted Takayuki Tanouye
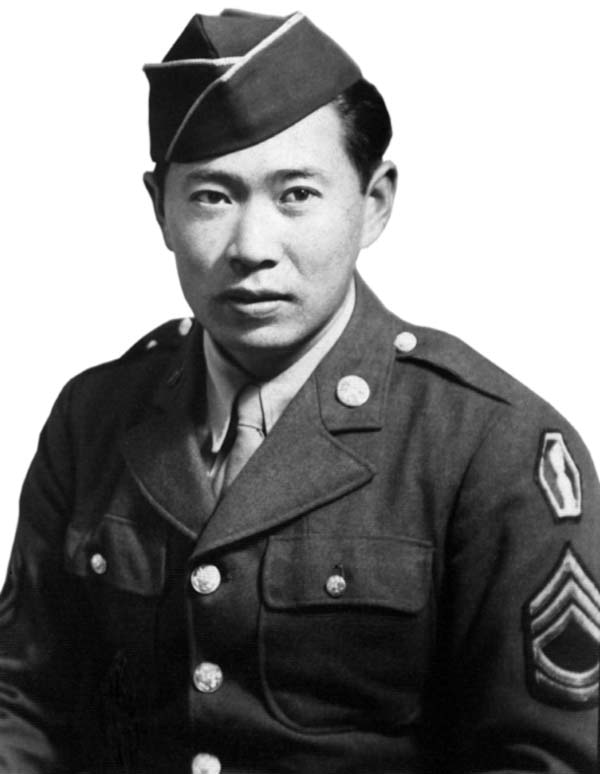
- Technical Sergeant Ted Tanouye
- Born: November 14, 1919; Torrance, California, US
- Died: September 6, 1944 (aged 24) near San Mauro Cilento, Italy
- Burial place: Evergreen Cemetery, Los Angeles, California, US
- Military career
- Allegiance: United States
- Branch: United States Army
- Service years: 1942–1944
- Rank: Technical Sergeant
- Nickname: "Tak"
- Unit: 442nd Regimental Combat Team
- Conflicts: Rome-Arno Campaign / World War II
- Awards: Medal of Honor; Purple Heart (2)

Ted Takayuki Tanouye (Japanese: 田上 隆行, November 14, 1919 – September 6, 1944) was a Japanese American soldier in the United States Army who posthumously received the United States military's highest decoration for bravery—the Medal of Honor—for his actions in World War II.

== Biography ==
Ted "Tak" Tanouye was born in Torrance, California, on November 14, 1919. The eldest of six children in a Japanese American family, he graduated from Torrance High School in 1938. At the time of the December 7, 1941 attack on Pearl Harbor, Tanouye was working in the produce department of Ray's Friendly Market, a local Japanese American owned grocery store.

On February 19, 1942, President Franklin D. Roosevelt issued Executive Order 9066 authorizing the incarceration of Japanese Americans in designated internment camps. Tanouye's parents and siblings were interned in the Jerome War Relocation Center near Jerome, Arkansas. After the Jerome camp was closed on June 30, 1944, the Tanouye family was transferred to the Rohwer War Relocation Center near Rohwer, Arkansas. Ted Tanouye, however, was never incarcerated; having enlisted in the U.S. Army on February 20, 1942.

Tanouye joined the 442nd Regimental Combat Team, a unit composed almost entirely of Japanese American soldiers, in 1943 and shipped out for Europe in 1944.

The 442nd was sent to Western Italy to aid the Allies' advance up the Northern Italian coast.

On July 7, 1944—only his third day on the front line—Tanouye was serving as a Technical Sergeant in the 442nd's Company K. During a battle on that day, near Molino a Ventoabbto, Italy, he repeatedly advanced ahead of his unit to attack opposing German forces alone, despite intense return fire. Although severely wounded by a grenade blast, he continued to fight until his platoon had succeeded in taking their objective, the crest of "Hill 140". Tanouye refused to be evacuated until he had organized a defensive position for his unit.

After recovering from his wounds, Tanouye returned to the front lines where, on September 1, 1944, he was mortally wounded by an exploding land mine near San Mauro Cilento, Italy. He died five days later on September 6, 1944.

Tanouye was buried in Italy. In 1948 his body was exhumed and returned to Los Angeles. A funeral service was held at the Buddhist Temple in Little Tokyo and Tanouye was interred in Evergreen Cemetery, Los Angeles, California.

For his heroic actions on July 7, 1944, Ted T. Tanouye was posthumously awarded the Army's second-highest decoration, the Distinguished Service Cross. A 1996 review of service records for Asian Americans who received the Distinguished Service Cross during World War II led to Tanouye's award being upgraded to the Medal of Honor. In a ceremony at the White House on June 21, 2000, his surviving family was presented with his Medal of Honor by President Bill Clinton. Twenty-one other Asian Americans also received the medal during the ceremony, all but seven of them posthumously.

In addition to receiving the Medal of Honor, Tanouye was also posthumously awarded the Bronze Star, Purple Heart with Oak Leaf Cluster, European-African-Middle Eastern Campaign Medal, Combat Infantryman Badge, and World War II Victory Medal.

== Honors ==
Tech. Sgt. Ted "Tak" Tanouye was honored in 2002 by the city of Torrance, California, with a permanent display in the Torrance Historical Society Museum.

The Torrance, California, National Guard Armory was dedicated on May 19, 2002, in Tanouye's honor.

On July 7, 2004, a stone and bronze memorial to Tanouye was dedicated in Triangle Park, located across the street from Torrance High School, where Tanouye had graduated in 1938, in Torrance, California.

== Medal of Honor citation ==
Medal of Honor

Technical Sergeant Ted T. Tanouye's official Medal of Honor citation reads:

Technical Sergeant Ted T. Tanouye distinguished himself by extraordinary heroism in action on 7 July 1944, near Molino A Ventoabbto, Italy. Technical Sergeant Tanouye led his platoon in an attack to capture the crest of a strategically important hill that afforded little cover. Observing an enemy machine gun crew placing its gun in position to his left front, Technical Sergeant Tanouye crept forward a few yards and opened fire on the position, killing or wounding three and causing two others to disperse. Immediately, an enemy machine pistol opened fire on him. He returned the fire and killed or wounded three more enemy soldiers. While advancing forward, Technical Sergeant Tanouye was subjected to grenade bursts, which severely wounded his left arm. Sighting an enemy-held trench, he raked the position with fire from his submachine gun and wounded several of the enemy. Running out of ammunition, he crawled 20 yards to obtain several clips from a comrade on his left flank. Next, sighting an enemy machine pistol that had pinned down his men, Technical Sergeant Tanouye crawled forward a few yards and threw a hand grenade into the position, silencing the pistol. He then located another enemy machine gun firing down the slope of the hill, opened fire on it, and silenced that position. Drawing fire from a machine pistol nest located above him, he opened fire on it and wounded three of its occupants. Finally taking his objective, Technical Sergeant Tanouye organized a defensive position on the reverse slope of the hill before accepting first aid treatment and evacuation. Technical Sergeant Tanouye's extraordinary heroism and devotion to duty are in keeping with the highest traditions of military service and reflect great credit on him, his unit, and the United States Army.

== See also ==
- List of Medal of Honor recipients for World War II
- List of Asian American Medal of Honor recipients
- List of Japanese Americans
- List of Asian Americans
