= Pioneer League (California) =

High school athletic league in California, USA

The Pioneer League is a high school athletic league that is part of the CIF Southern Section. Members are located in the South Bay, Los Angeles.

== Member schools ==
- El Segundo High School
- Lawndale High School
- North Torrance High School
- South Torrance High School
- Torrance High School
- West Torrance High School

== Former members ==
- Centennial High School
- Leuzinger High School
- Inglewood High School
- Morningside High School
- Beverly Hills High School
