= Chad Morton =

American football player and coach (born 1977)

Jacksonville Jaguars
- Title: Running backs coach

Personal information
- Born: April 4, 1977 (age 49); Torrance, California, U.S.
- Listed height: 5 ft 8 in (1.73 m)
- Listed weight: 191 lb (87 kg)

Career information
- Position: Running back (No. 30, 26, 20, 29)
- High school: South (Torrance)
- College: USC
- NFL draft: 2000: 5th round, 166th overall pick

Career history

Playing
- New Orleans Saints (2000); New York Jets (2001–2002); Washington Redskins (2003–2004); New England Patriots (2005)*; New York Giants (2005–2006)
- * Offseason or practice squad member only

Coaching
- Green Bay Packers (2009) Coaching administrator; Green Bay Packers (2010–2013) Assistant special teams coach; Seattle Seahawks (2014) Assistant special teams coach; Seattle Seahawks (2015–2016) Assistant running backs coach; Seattle Seahawks (2017–2021) Running backs coach; Seattle Seahawks (2022–2023) Run game coordinator & running backs coach; Chicago Bears (2024) Running backs coach; Jacksonville Jaguars (2025–present) Running backs coach

Awards and highlights
- NFL records: Most kickoff return touchdowns in a single game: 2 (2002 vs Buffalo Bills) (tied with 9 others); Longest overtime kickoff returned for a touchdown: 96 (2002 vs Buffalo Bills); Most receptions in a playoff game by a rookie: 13 (2000); Most receptions in a playoff game: 13 (2000) (tied with 3 others); As a coach: Super Bowl champion (XLV)

Career NFL statistics
- Rushing attempts: 89
- Rushing yards: 382
- Receptions: 48
- Receiving yards: 419
- Return yards: 6,832
- Total touchdowns: 5
- Stats at Pro Football Reference

Chad Akio Morton (born April 4, 1977) is an American former professional football running back and kick/punt returner and current coach who serves as the running backs coach for the Jacksonville Jaguars of the National Football League (NFL). He previously served as the running backs coach for the Seattle Seahawks from 2017 to 2023.

Morton played college football for the USC and was selected in the fifth round of the 2000 NFL draft by the New Orleans Saints. After a standout rookie year with the Saints, Morton played five more years between stints with the New York Jets, the Washington Redskins, and the New York Giants.

Morton previously served as an assistant coach for the Seattle Seahawks and Green Bay Packers, where he was part of the coaching staff when the team won the Super Bowl in 2010.

== Early life ==
Morton attended South High School in Torrance, California, where he was a letterman in football.

== Playing career ==
=== College ===
Morton was a running back at the University of Southern California in the late-1990s. A notable moment in Morton's college football career was in 1999, when he guaranteed a Trojans victory prior to a game against the UCLA who carried an eight-game winning streak against USC. Morton ran for 143 yards in a USC victory. In 2010, it was named by ESPN as the fourth biggest moment in the USC-UCLA football rivalry.

=== National Football League ===
Pre-draft measurables
Height	Weight	Arm length	Hand span	40-yard dash	10-yard split	20-yard split	Vertical jump	Broad jump	Bench press
5 ft 7 5/8 in (1.72 m)	182 lb (83 kg)	30 in (0.76 m)	8 1/2 in (0.22 m)	4.49 s	1.54 s	2.59 s	36.0 in (0.91 m)	10 ft 1 in (3.07 m)	18 reps
All values from NFL Combine

Selected 166th overall (the fifth round) of the 2000 NFL draft by the New Orleans Saints, Morton became one of very few rookie running backs in Saints history to get significant playing time (16 games) and make an impact on offense and as a kick returner his first year in the pros. He contributed a career-best receiving year 213 yards on 30 catches (7.1 yards per reception), plus 136 yards rushing, and 1,029 yards from 44 kick returns to the Saints' successful, 10-6 NFC West title-winning 2000 season. Morton's postseason contributions were especially crucial to the 2000 Saints. Following the New Orleans Saints' first ever playoff win, they hosted the Minnesota Vikings for the divisional round game, and Morton set the record for most receptions in a single playoff game by a rookie, while tying the playoff game record for most receptions by a player, with 13 in the ultimately losing effort against the Vikings.

Morton's career-best year at kick returner came with the 2002 New York Jets, as he earned .1,509 yards and two touchdowns (both TDs in a single game) returning kickoffs for Herman Edwards' Jets squad, which won the AFC East title that year and ran away with a blowout win in the first round of the playoffs before falling in the divisional round to the ultimate AFC Championship winners, the Raiders.

He was a first alternate to the 2005 Pro Bowl as a kick returner.

His last year playing football was 2006 with the New York Giants, as he suffered a career-ending ACL tear in Week 16 while covering a punt. On February 13, 2007, he was released by the Giants.

=== NFL records ===
- Most kickoff return touchdowns in a single game: 2 (2002 vs Buffalo Bills) (tied with 9 others)
- Longest overtime kickoff returned for a touchdown: 96 (2002 vs Buffalo Bills)
- Most receptions in a playoff game by a rookie: 13 (2000)
- Most receptions in a playoff game: 13 (2000) (tied with 3 others)

== Coaching career ==
=== Green Bay Packers ===
In 2009, Morton was hired by the Green Bay Packers as their coaching administrator. In February 2010, Morton was promoted to assistant special teams coach. Morton assisted the Packers 2010 special teams units that ultimately won championship rings in Super Bowl XLV. With a coaching staff shakeup following the Packers' 2013 season, he left Green Bay.

=== Seattle Seahawks ===
In 2014, Morton was hired by the Seattle Seahawks as their assistant special teams coach under head coach Pete Carroll. In 2015, Morton was promoted to assistant running backs coach. In 2017, he was promoted to running backs coach. In 2022, Morton was promoted to run game coordinator and running backs coach.

=== Chicago Bears ===
On February 21, 2024, Morton was hired by the Chicago Bears as their running backs coach under head coach Matt Eberflus. On January 24, 2025, it was announced that Morton would not return to the Bears in 2025.

== Personal life ==
Chad Morton is of mixed ethnicity, African American and Japanese. He is married to his wife Tamra and is the younger brother of Eric Morton. His older brother, Johnnie Morton, played 12 seasons in the NFL from 1994 to 2005.
