= South High School (Torrance, California) =

Location
- 4801 Pacific Coast Highway; Torrance, California 90505-5544; USA; 33.81296°N 118.36352°W

Information
- Type: Public Secondary
- Established: 1957
- School district: Torrance Unified School District
- Superintendent: Tim Stowe
- Dean: Lisa Cherry
- Principal: Jim Evans
- Athletic Director: Kevin VanWaardenburg
- Staff: 83.85 (FTE)
- Grades: 9–12
- Enrollment: 1,841 (2024–25)
- Average class size: 34
- Student to teacher ratio: 23.57
- Colors: Kelly green and white
- Athletics: Baseball; Basketball; Cross Country; Football; Golf; Soccer; Softball; Surf; Swimming; Tennis; Track & Field; Volleyball; Water Polo; Wrestling; Cheer; Dance
- Athletics conference: CIF Southern Section; Pioneer League
- Nickname: Spartans
- Newspaper: Sword & Shield
- Yearbook: Olympiad
- Website: shs.tusd.org

South High School is a public high school in Torrance, California. It is one of five high schools in the Torrance Unified School District (TUSD).

As of 2025, South High School is ranked as the best school in TUSD by US News, in which it ranks nationally at #1,021 and #135 at the state level.

== History ==
South High School opened in September 1957 and moved to a new campus in January, 1958 with 20 buildings and 106 classrooms. It currently serves children south of Sepulveda, west of Hawthorne and north of Lomita Boulevard.

In 1980 Asahi Gakuen, a weekend Japanese-language education institution, began renting space in South Torrance High School. The school continues to use the school for its Torrance Campus (トーランス校 Tōransu-kō).

In 2004, South High was under refurbishment. Renovations include improved handicapped accessibility, improved lighting, and new signage.

During winter break of 1998-1999, American Beauty was filmed on the South High School campus. Many contemporary South High students were featured as extras in the scenes set on campus.

The short movie Skaterdater was filmed using the Imperial Skateboard Club whose members went to South High.

== Demographics ==
In the 2024–25 school year, South High had an enrollment of 1,841 students.

- African-American - 2.6%
- Asian - 37.6%
- Hispanic or Latino - 22.6%
- Pacific Islander - 0.10%
- Caucasian - 26.9%
- Multi-Racial - 9.9%

The average household income of South High's ZIP codes (90505 and 90277) is $147,185 and $184,665 respectively.

== Athletics ==
South High's mascot is the Spartan, and their colors are green and white.

== Activities ==
The Marching Band won West High Invitationals Sweepstakes 2009, 2010 Percussion State Champs, and the 2011 & 2013 SCJA Division 5A State Champions.

The South High 2014-15 Advanced Dance Team were the 2015 USA Dance National Champions in the category "Novelty."

In 2017, the 2016-17 Advanced Dance Team became state champions at the USA State Championship, while also placing first in several divisions at USA Regionals.

The 2016-17 Athletic Training Program placed first in the small school division at the St. Francis Sports Medical Competition.

South High School has an accomplished the Speech and Debate program which has represented the district (WBFL) at the state level multiple years.

== Notable alumni ==
- Mike Andrews: former MLB second baseman, currently Chair of The Jimmy Fund
- Rob Andrews: former MLB second baseman
- Greg Bargar: former MLB pitcher
- Tom Beach: Olympic and Pan American Games artistic gymnast
- Gillian Boxx: 1996 Olympic gold medalist (Softball)
- Shannon Boxx: 2004, 2008 Olympic gold medallist (Soccer)
- Chuck Codd: former professional soccer player
- Juan Croucier: former bassist for Ratt
- Michael B. Donley: former US Secretary of the Air Force
- Chris Donnels: former MLB third baseman
- Tim Drevno: former offensive line coach for the San Francisco 49ers
- Jason Farol: singer on Duets (TV series)
- Steven Roger Fischer: prominent academician, writer and preeminent Polynesian historian, ethnographer, and linguist
- Ryo Fujii: professional soccer player
- Fred Goss: TV director, actor, producer and writer
- Chad Morton: former NFL running back and kick/punt returner
- Johnnie Morton: former NFL wide receiver, mixed martial artist
- Greg Popovich: Founder & Owner of Castle Rock Winery
- Sendhil Mullainathan: professor of economics at The University of Chicago
- Aaron North: lead guitarist for Nine Inch Nails
- Bob Anderson: USA Teams, AAU and college champion wrestler
- David Patterson: professor of computer science at University of California, Berkeley and winner of the ACM AM Turing Award, the Nobel Prize of Computer Science
- Steve Smith: former world record holder in the indoor pole vault
- Mike Song: Professional dancer for Kinjaz
- Ken Turner: former MLB pitcher
- Chauncey Washington: former NFL running back
- John White: CFL running back
- Alejandro Daniel Wolff: American diplomat, former US Ambassador to Chile and acting U.S. Permanent Representative to the United Nations
