= North High School (Torrance, California) =

North Torrance High School
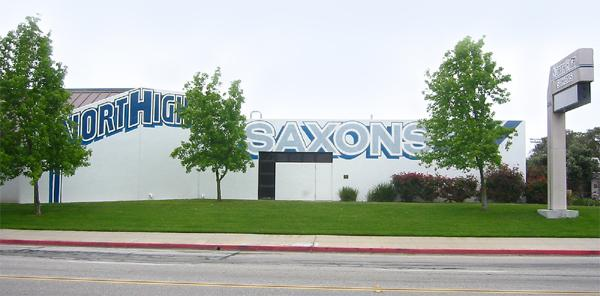

Location
- 3620 West 182nd Street; Torrance, California 90504; United States
- 33.864748°N 118.337029°W

Information
- Type: Public Secondary
- Established: 1955
- Principal: Paul Nitake
- Staff: 70.52 (FTE)
- Grades: 8–12
- Enrollment: 1,812 (2024-25)
- Student to teacher ratio: 25.68
- Colors: Blue and White
- Athletics conference: CIF Southern Section; Pioneer League
- Nickname: Saxons
- Website: https://www.tusd.org/schools/north-high-school

North Torrance High School is a four-year public high school located at 3620 W. 182nd St. in Torrance, California. Of the five public high schools in the Torrance Unified School District, North High is the second oldest. The school's mascot is the Saxon and the school colors are blue and white. North High is accredited by Western Association of Schools and Colleges.

== School facts ==
- Opened in September 1955
- Campus has 24 buildings and 100 classrooms
- Serves youth living north of 190th St. to north city boundaries
- Maximum student enrollment capacity is 3000

== Demographics ==
The demographic breakdown of the 1,812 students enrolled for the 2024-25 school year was:

- Male - 50.3%
- Female - 49.7%
- Native American/Native Alaskan - 0.1%
- Asian - 27.2%
- Black - 7.7%
- Hispanic - 46.7%
- White - 9.5%
- Native Hawaiian/Pacific Islander - 1%
- Multiracial - 7.8%

Additionally, 44.6% of students were eligible for free or reduced-price lunch.

== Athletics ==
- North High was 1971 CIF 4A (Largest school division) Baseball Champions beating Chaffey HS 9-0
- North High's Dennis Littlejohn (San Francisco Giants drafted 1st rd #2 overall) named 1971 CIF baseball player of the year
- North High was 1972 CIF 4A (Largest school division) Baseball Runner Up losing to Dominguez HS 5-4 Jim O'Brien head coach
- North High was 1974 CIF 4A (Largest school division) Baseball Champions beating Lakewood HS 1-0 Jim O'Brien head coach
- North High was also named Cal Hi best school baseball team for the 1974 season with a season record or 26-6-1
- North High's Tim O'Neal was named CIF baseball player of the year (who pitched both sides of the 21 inning championship game)
- The 1974 Championship game began at Anaheim Stadium ended in a 0–0 tie after a curfew of time then to be completely replayed a couple days later at USC's Rod Dedeaux field for a 1–0 victory for a total of 21 innings, clearly one of the if not the greatest championship games in High school baseball history. North High's Tim O'Neal pitched both games.
- Prior to 2003–2004 North High was in the Ocean League and also The Bay League. In 2007–2008 North High was voted by the Pioneer League as the runner-up for Most Athletic School.

=== Accomplishments ===
- In 2010–2011 North High School's marching band won state championships in the 2A division
- In 2012 North High Saxon Regiment Marching Band and Color Guard won state championships in the 3A division
- In 2023 the North High Saxon Regiment Marching Band and Color Guard won 1st place in WBA State Class championships for the 2A division

== Notable alumni ==
- Jason Acuña (born 1973), stuntman
- Nanette Barragán (born 1976), Member of the U.S. House of Representatives from California's 44th district
- William Bonin (1947–1996), serial killer and rapist
- Chris Demaria (born 1980), baseball player
- Chris Farasopoulos (born 1949), football player New York Jets
- Malcolm B. Frost (born 1966), U.S. Army major general
- Bob Hite (1943–1981), Co-lead vocalist of Canned Heat'
- Jesse Juarez (born 1981), professional mixed martial artist and wrestler
- Dennis Littlejohn (born 1954), baseball player
- Chris Mortensen (born 1951), journalist
- Emanuel Newton (born 1984), professional Mixed Martial Artist
- Chuck Norris (born 1940-2026), actor and martial artist
- Nathan Salmon (born 1951), philosopher (Class of 1969)
- Jim Millinder (born 1958), soccer player and coach
- Kikuo Nishi aka KeyKool (born 1970), Rapper Visionaries (hip hop group)
- Aaron Takahashi, actor
- Tiny Ron Taylor (1947–2019), actor and baseball player

== Campus radio station ==
A campus radio station, first on a closed-circuit basis and (after 1966) on FM as KNHS at 89.7 MHz, operated from 1957 to 1991.

== North High JROTC ==
The North High JROTC Program was formed in 1996 and operational as of 1997. The North High JROTC Program has been a recipient of the Honor Unit with Distinction since 2000. This status is given to 10% of JROTC programs worldwide. North High's JROTC program has been known for hosting the Golden Bear National Drill competition. As of 2021 the program is being run by Lieutenant Colonel Noland Flores and Command Sergeant Major Michael Baker.

=== Golden Bear ===
Golden Bear is a West Coast National Drill Meet that consists of competitions for four divisions including unarmed, armed, color guard, and saber. It is currently the largest JROTC competition on the West Coast with as many at 60+ schools, which also include the JROTC units in South Korea, and Japan, attending.
