= Las Virgenes Unified School District =

School district in California, United States

Las Virgenes Unified School District (LVUSD) is a K–12 school district headquartered in Calabasas, California, United States. The district, serving the western section of the San Fernando Valley and the eastern Conejo Valley in Los Angeles County, consists of 14 public schools.

The district includes, in Los Angeles County: Agoura Hills, almost all of Calabasas, Hidden Hills, most of Westlake Village, and small portions of the West Hills section of Los Angeles, and small portions of the Topanga unincorporated census-designated place. In Ventura County, it includes the vast majority of the unincorporated census-designated place of Bell Canyon.

Its largest school is Agoura High School, with approximately 2,682 students.

== Schools ==
LVUSD includes the following schools:

=== High schools ===
- Agoura High School (AHS)
- Calabasas High School (CHS)
- Indian Hills High School

=== Middle schools ===
- Arthur E. Wright Middle School (A. E. Wright)
- Alice C. Stelle Middle School (A. C. Stelle)
- Lindero Canyon Middle School (LCMS)

=== Preschool ===
- Buttercup Preschool

=== Elementary schools ===
- Bay Laurel Elementary School
- Chaparral Elementary School
- Lupin Hill Elementary School
- Mariposa School of Global Education
- Round Meadow Elementary School
- Sumac L-STEM Elementary School
- White Oak Elementary School
- Willow Elementary School
- Yerba Buena Elementary School (Y.B.)

=== K-12 school ===
- LVUSD Virtual Academy

== History ==
=== One-room schools ===
By the 1940s, the territory that is now the Las Virgenes district was divided among four one-room schools, each with its own school district:

- Calabasas School, built in 1890, replacing an 1888 school;
- Las Virgenes School, established in 1884;
- Liberty School, formed from part of Calabasas and Las Virgenes districts in 1896; and
- Cornell School, formed from the southwest part of Liberty district in 1913.

=== Union school district ===
In 1947, these four districts merged to form the Las Virgenes Union School District. A new Las Virgenes union grade school was built to replace the old schools; this has since become A.E. Wright Middle School, named after Arthur E. Wright, a childless English immigrant (why this information about being "childless" is important, no one knows) with only a preschool education, who nonetheless took an interest in local education, was elected to the Liberty school board, and was instrumental in forming the union school district.

=== High school district demise ===
All the one-room school districts' territories had been annexed into Los Angeles City High School District on August 18, 1921, and until the 1960s, the teenagers of these grade school districts attended Canoga Park High School. However, the creation of Los Angeles Unified School District in 1961 took away the vast majority of the high school district, leaving only the territory of the Las Virgenes and Topanga grade school districts. The high school district renamed itself West County Union High School District, but had no high school left in its territory. Topanga School District voted to join L.A. Unified the next school year, leaving West County with the same border as Las Virgenes Union School District as of July 1, 1962, and California law made coterminous grade school and high school districts automatically become a unified school district, thus creating Las Virgenes Unified School District.

=== Unified school district ===
Though L.A. Unified was required to provide high school education to Las Virgenes for three years, California law mandated that, if a unified school district did not establish its own high school by September 1965, the district would be annexed to an adjacent district with a high school. In January 1963, LVUSD residents had already voted down construction financing by very narrow margins, and many residents were still advocating a merger into a bigger district. If financing had been voted down again, the Los Angeles County Board of Supervisors would have had to choose an adjacent district to annex LVUSD territory into: L.A. Unified, Oxnard, Santa Monica, or Simi. However, in the April 16, 1963 election, the voters approved the bond issue and state aid authorization — the latter by only four votes — which allowed LVUSD to build Agoura High School and three grade schools.

When the district was created, its offices were located on the grounds of the Round Meadow Elementary School in Calabasas. They were then moved in 1974 to 30961 West Agoura Road in Westlake Village, and again in 1990 to a two-story building at 4111 North Las Virgenes Road, next to the A.E. Wright Middle School.

LVUSD annexed the community of Bell Canyon in Ventura County, California in 1987.

== Operations ==
=== Independent study ===
On June 26, 2006, the Board of Education approved the formation of the district's alternative Independent Study School. The school offers two curricular options: K–12 independent Study where students report to the school site at least once a week to meet with an independent study teacher and K–12 Home Independent Study (Home schooling) which provides a home schooling independent study curriculum.

=== School foundation ===
Community members formed a school foundation, The Foundation for Las Virgenes Schools, in 2010 in response to the dramatic loss of State funding for public education. The mission of the foundation is to provide general financial support for the public schools in the Las Virgenes Unified School District.

The foundation has granted over 1 million dollars to Las Virgenes schools since 2012. It hosts an annual fundraiser to raise money for enhancing and improving education in LVUSD. It is the only organization that can pay for credentialed classroom teachers and counselors.
