= Torrance High School =

Location
- 2200 W. Carson Street; Torrance, California 90501; United States; 33.82925°N 118.3211661°W

Information
- Type: Public
- Established: September 11, 1917
- School district: Torrance Unified School District (1947-); Redondo Union High School District (1946-1947); Los Angeles City High School District (1917-1946)
- Principal: Karim Girgis
- Faculty: 86
- Teaching staff: 76.53 (FTE)
- Enrollment: 1,879 (2024-25)
- Student to teacher ratio: 25.87
- Colors: Maroon; Grey
- Athletics conference: CIF Southern Section; Pioneer League
- Nickname: Tartars
- Website: https://www.tusd.org/schools/torrance-high-school
- Torrance School
- U.S. National Register of Historic Places
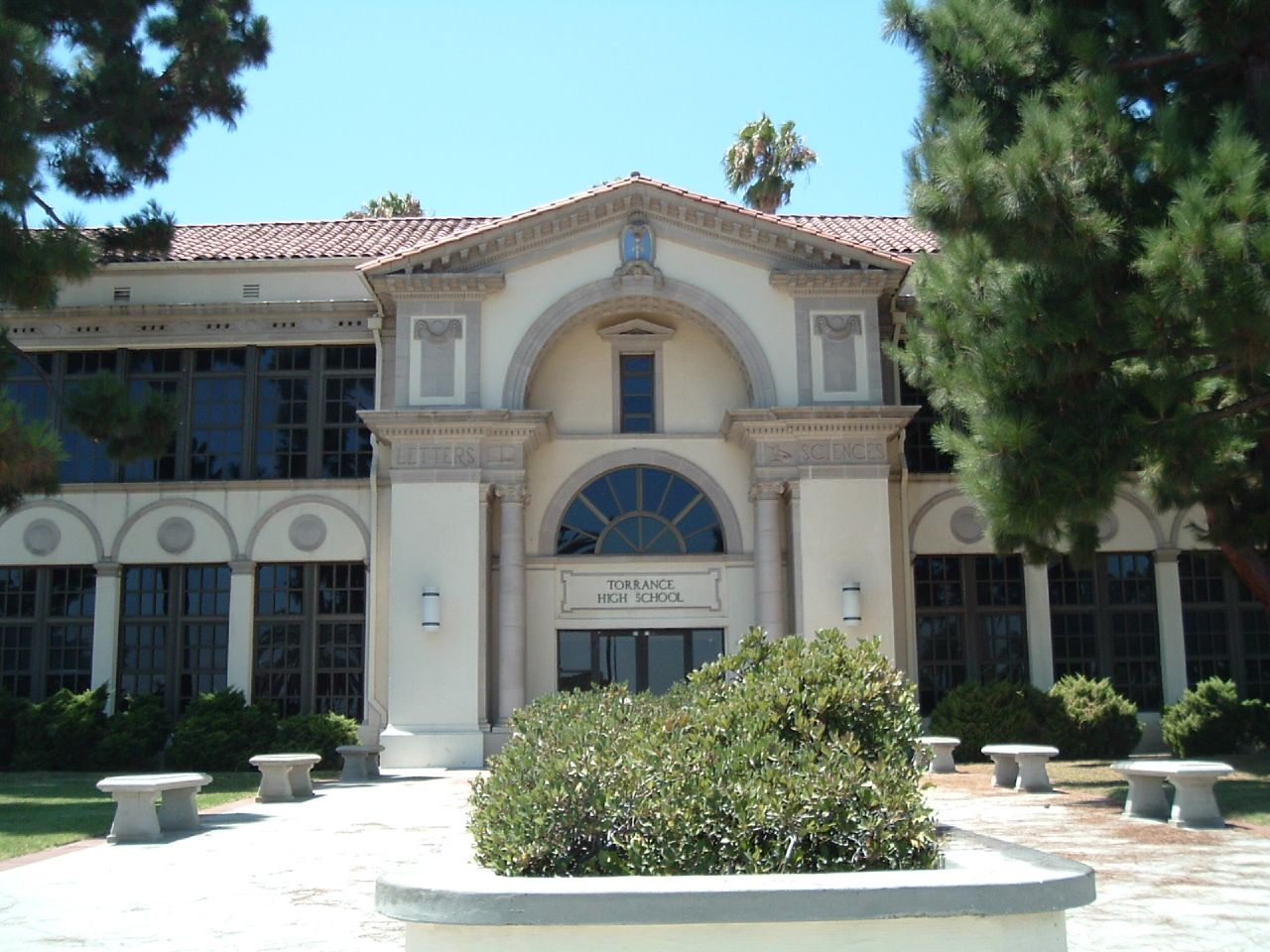
- Facade of Torrance High School

- Location within the Los Angeles metropolitan area Location within California Location within the United States
- Area: 1 acre (0.40 ha)
- Built: 1925
- Architect: Cline, E. H.
- Architectural style: Renaissance
- MPS: Torrance High School Campus TR
- NRHP reference No.: 83003542
- Added to NRHP: October 13, 1983

Torrance High School is a high school located in Torrance, California. Founded in 1917, it is one of the oldest high schools in continuous use in California and is the oldest of the five high schools in the Torrance Unified School District. Four of its buildings are listed on the U.S. National Register of Historic Places.

Torrance High School is a popular filming location for television and motion picture production. It is most widely known for its appearance in high-profile television shows, including Beverly Hills, 90210 and Buffy the Vampire Slayer. It is the alma mater of broadcaster Paul Moyer, Medal of Honor recipient Ted Tanouye, World War II prisoner of war Louis Zamperini, professional golfer Angela Park and professional golfer Jenny Shin.

== School history ==
Torrance High School first opened on September 11, 1917, under the jurisdiction of the Los Angeles High School District, as a combination high school and elementary school to accommodate the area's rapid post-World War I growth brought on by the region's petroleum industry and iron works, as well as the Pacific Electric Railway expansion. Upon its opening in 1917, the school consisted of 10 rooms, seven of which were used for classrooms.

Torrance High's first commencement ceremony took place on June 18, 1918, during which two female students received their diplomas. As the population of students at Torrance High grew, new buildings were constructed to accommodate the increasing student body. Additions were added to the main building in 1921 which included the senior patio and fountain. By 1923, two additional buildings - the home economics wing and auditorium - were constructed on both sides of the main building. The growing number of high school students led to the construction of a separate building to serve elementary students. Known today as the Torrance High Annex, the building remained an elementary school until 1963 when it was annexed by Torrance High. A school newspaper was established in 1922 called The Tentacle. It was changed to the Torrance News Torch in 1926 to better match with the school yearbook's name, The Torch. More additions to the school were made in the late 1920s, including a gymnasium and a print shop to print the newspaper and yearbook.

In 1947 Torrance Unified School District—TUSD was formed but was not certified for a high school. During the school year of fall 1947 to summer 1948, Torrance High School was part of the Redondo Union High School District, as the Torrance School District split from the Los Angeles City School District and Los Angeles City High School District, but California law prevented the newly-formed Torrance school district from immediately controlling high schools. Torrance High joined what became Torrance Unified School District the following year. Torrance High has a series of underground bomb shelters located throughout the school, dating back from the Cold War era. The very first graduating high school class from Torrance Unified School District was the Class of 1948.

In 2004, Torrance High instated its Schoolwide Academic Goals in an effort to raise its education standards. Comprising an acronym of the mascot's name, they outline goals of technical competency and other standards. Every year, about 50% of the seniors attend community colleges after graduating.

== Demographics ==
In 2024–2025 school year, Torrance High had an enrollment of 1,879.

- African American - 4.3%
- American Indian or Alaska Native - 0.1%
- Asian - 17%
- Filipino - 10.6%
- Hispanic or Latino - 44.3%
- Pacific Islander - 0.3%
- White - 15%
- Two or More Races - 7.9%
- Not Reported - 0.5%

The average gross income of Torrance High's ZIP code (90501) in 2020 is $61,979.

== Campus ==
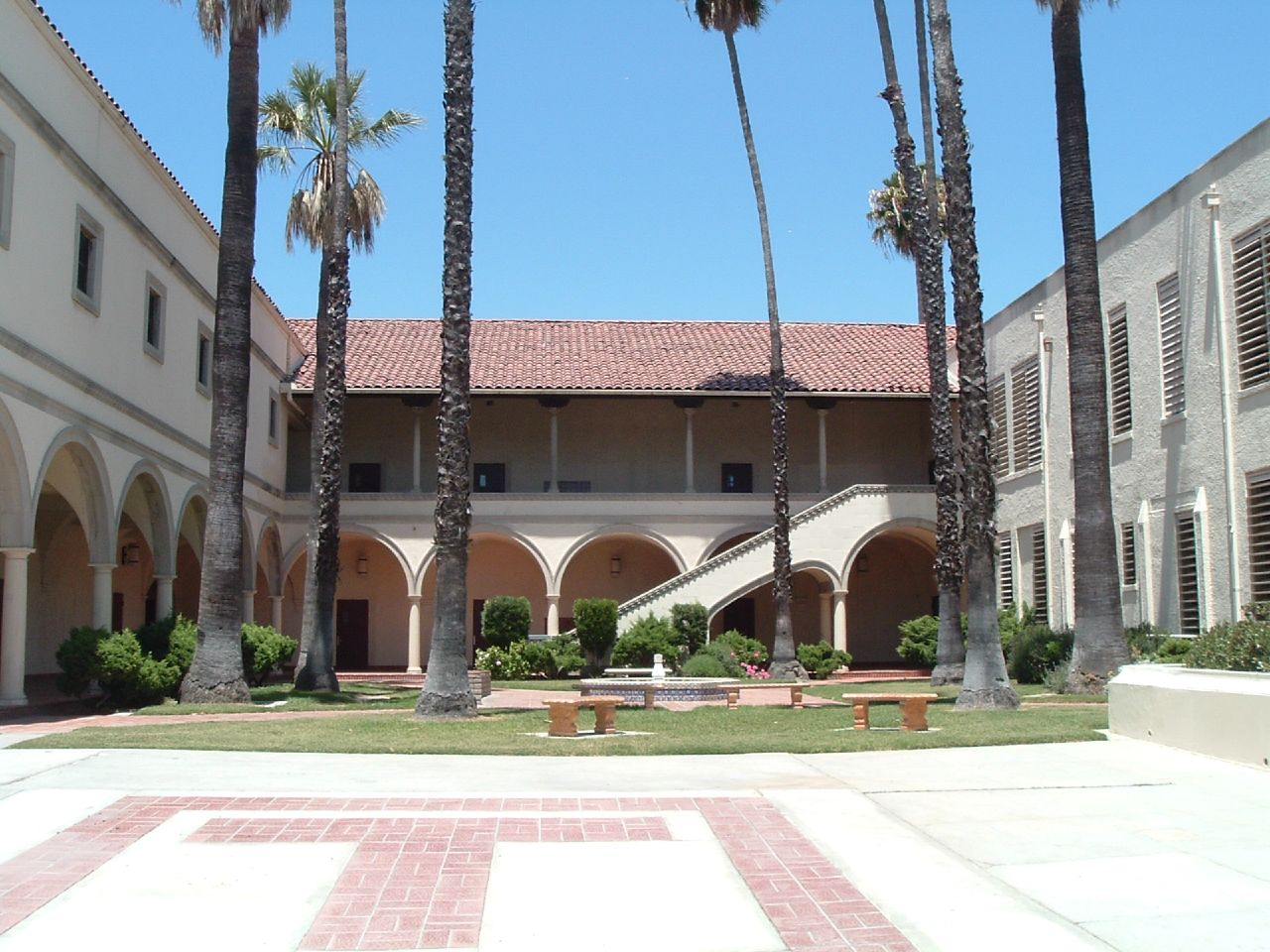
The 1923 "Senior Patio" behind the THS Main Building

The Long Beach earthquake (magnitude 6.4) on March 10, 1933, left its mark on the campus. The quake destroyed the upper part of the original auditorium and caused the ground near it to sink several feet. The area was nicknamed the "Sunken Garden" until rebuilt. The landmark auditorium replacing it was built in 1937 as a Works Progress Administration project while the elevated administrative offices were added in 1962.

In 2018, Architectural Digest named Torrance High School the most beautiful high school in California.

=== Filming history ===
Torrance High's unique architecture and relative proximity to Hollywood Studios make it an ideal filming location for major television programs and motion pictures. Its credits include:

Television

- All American High, a documentary film chronicling the life of the 1984 THS senior class, was filmed on the campus. The film is narrated by a Finnish exchange student, and observes 1980's California high school culture from a foreigner's perspective. All American High Revisited (2014) combines the original film with new footage of the film's principal subjects being interviewed on their high school years, the process of growing up, and the various paths in life that they took.
- Beverly Hills 90210 and its spin-off 90210
- Buffy the vampire slayer

== Notable alumni ==
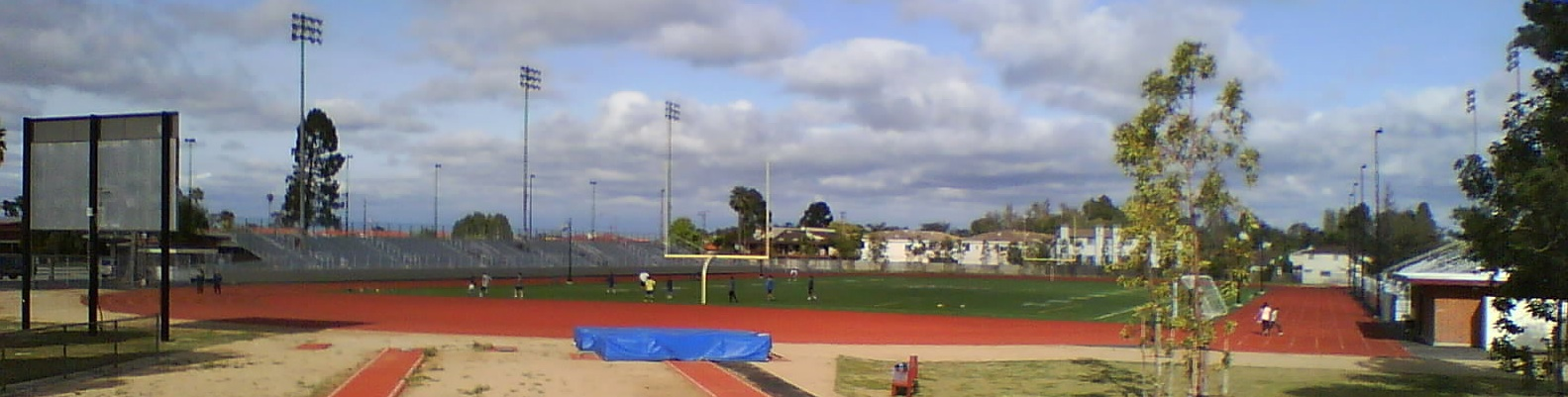
Zamperini Stadium near Torrance High School

=== Military ===
- Louis Zamperini (1936) — track star and World War II hero; 2015 Rose Parade Grand Marshal; film and book Unbroken based on his life
- Ted T. Tanouye (1938) — Medal of Honor recipient in the Asian-American segregated unit during the Second World War, The 442nd Regimental Combat Team; a memorial is dedicated to him in front of the school
- Gary R. Pfingston (1958) — 10th Chief Master Sergeant of the Air Force
- Rocky Chavez (1969) — politician, California State Assemblyman from the 76th District, retired USMC colonel

=== Entertainment ===
- Bobby Blotzer – drummer for Ratt
- Juan Croucier – bass player for Ratt and Dokken
- Danny Gans – singer, actor, impressionist
- Gregory Hatanaka – film director
- Dave Kerman – drummer
- Paul Moyer – television newscaster
- David Pack – leader of the band Ambrosia

=== Sports ===
- Fred Claire – general manager of 1988 World Series champion Los Angeles Dodgers
- Kevin Higgins – former Major League Baseball player
- Bart Johnson – Major League Baseball player
- Steve Kealey – Major League Baseball player
- Fred Kendall – former Major League Baseball player and coach
- Jason Kendall – former Major League Baseball player
- Lucas Lee – PGA Tour golfer, helped UCLA win the 2008 NCAA Men's Golf Championship
- Justin Miller – Major League Baseball player
- Yura Min – Olympic ice dancer
- Lisa Moretti – professional wrestler: Gorgeous Ladies of Wrestling and World Wrestling Entertainment champion under the name "Ivory"
- Vladimir Morozov – bronze medalist in 2012 Summer Olympics; holds Russian record for 50m backstroke, 100m individual medley (short course meters)
- Angela Park – professional golfer, won LPGA 2007 Rookie of the Year Award
- Thierry Pham – former professional tennis player
- Demi Runas – LPGA professional golfer since 2015
- Townsend Saunders – Olympic medalist in freestyle wrestling; California state runner-Up 1985
- Jenny Shin – professional golfer since 2011, won the 2016 LPGA Volunteers of America Texas Shootout and has 22 top 10 finishes
- Tyrone Taylor – Major League Baseball player for the New York Mets
- Deon Thompson (2006) – basketball player, North Carolina Tar Heels
- Antone Williamson – Major League Baseball player for Milwaukee Brewers
