= Los Angeles City School District =

Former school district serving Los Angeles, California area

The Los Angeles City School District was a school district that served Los Angeles, California, and some adjoining areas between 1870 and 1961.

== History ==
The district was formed on May 2, 1870, with the same boundaries as the city of Los Angeles. In 1890 the Los Angeles City High School District was formed to serve high school students. The Los Angeles City School District and various other feeder elementary school districts served elementary and junior high students.

The elementary school district annexed various elementary school districts during its existence. The annexations include:

- April 17, 1896: Harmony and Rosedale
- February 26, 1906: McKinley
- 1907
  - January 22: Green Meadows and Sunnyside
  - February 25: Gardena
  - April 8: Howard and Moneta
- 1909
  - August 7: Lincoln, San Pedro, and Wilmington
  - August 27: Dominguez
  - November 8: Cahuenga
- 1910
  - February 21: Hollywood
  - February 28: Los Felis
  - March 7: Coldwater-Lankershim and Laurel
- 1912
  - February 1: Mt. Washington-Washington Park
  - February 9: American and Annandale
  - March 25: Belvedere
  - July 8: Miramonte
- 1915
  - June 1: Chatsworth Park, Pacoima, and Van Nuys
  - June 22: Farmdale
  - July 12: Morningside and San Fernando
- 1917
  - July 30: Cienega
  - August 27: Vineland
- 1918
  - March 11: National
  - April 22: Hansen Height
- 1921
  - August 8: Russell
  - October 27: Sawtelle
- 1923
  - May 17: Eagle Rock
  - June 18: Hyde Park
  - November 15: Graham
- May 4, 1925: Watts
- 1926
  - August 23: Monte Vista and Venice City
  - December 6: Bell and Maywood
- 1927
  - May 18: San Antonio
  - May 23: Playa del Rey
  - December 19: Palomar
- January 23, 1928: Vernon City
- February 20, 1929: Tujunga
- August 31, 1931: Tweedy
- January 18, 1932: Huntington Park

The Palos Verdes Peninsula region was formerly in the Los Angeles city district. However that area seceded effective January 26, 1925, when the Palos Verdes School District was established.

Torrance was originally in the district; Sam Gnerre of The Daily Breeze wrote that "As early as the 1920s, the city had expressed unhappiness over being allied with LAUSD." [sic] Dr. J.S. Lancaster created a campaign to establish a school district in the mid-1920s, but the first two formal referendums on secession, on April 11, 1932 and March 16, 1937, respectively, failed on 1,346-572 and 932-378 bases. However on August 20, 1946, Torrance voters did approve a new city charter, 1,371-761, which allowed for a new district to be created. Torrance seceded in 1947 and created a new school district, which in 1948 became the Torrance Unified School District (TUSD). The Los Angeles City School District removed all of the furniture from the Torrance elementary and middle schools; Gnerre wrote that "LAUSD [sic] was not pleased with the outcome of the election."

The elementary school district disappeared on July 1, 1961, when it became a unified school district, the Los Angeles Unified School District. The change of the Los Angeles City and the Palos Verdes School District into being unified school districts left the Topanga School District and the Las Vergenes Union School District as separate remnants of the high school district, renamed to the West County Union High School District.
