= Torrance Unified School District =

School district in California

Address
- 2335 Plaza del Amo Torrance, California, 90501; United States

District information
- Type: Public
- Grades: K–12
- Established: 1947; 79 years ago
- Superintendent: Tim Stowe
- Schools: 32
- NCES District ID: 0639420

Students and staff
- Students: 22,023 (2024–2025)
- Teachers: 875.84 (FTE)
- Staff: 1,157.21 (FTE)
- Student–teacher ratio: 25.15:1

Other information
- Website: www.tusd.org

Torrance Unified School District (TUSD) is a school district in Los Angeles County, California, with its headquarters in Torrance.

The district board of education has a president, a vice president, a clerk, and two members. As of 2026, the District Superintendent is Tim Stowe. The TUSD suburban schools generally rank high academically; West High has won several County Academic Decathlons.

The current board consists of Jasmine Park (president), Anil Muhammed (vice president), Betty Lieu (clerk), and James Han.

== History ==
Prior to 1947 Torrance residents were in the Los Angeles City School District and the Los Angeles High School District. Evelyn Carr sought to establish a permanent school district and did so through a group she created, the Torrance Parents Association. A referendum held on August 20, 1946, to change the city charter to allow creating a new school district, passed on a basis. In 1947 a new school district was immediately formed, although for the 1947-1948 school year Torrance High School was in the Redondo Union High School District since California law prevented the newly-formed Torrance school district from immediately controlling high schools. The Los Angeles City School District removed all of the furniture from the Torrance elementary and middle schools; Sam Gnerre of The Daily Breeze wrote that "LAUSD [sic] was not pleased with the outcome of the election."

In 1948 Torrance's high schools and elementary schools unified into one district. The city's oldest school is Torrance High School, founded in 1917. Forty new schools were built in a building boom following World War II, as the city grew from its pre-war 10,000 to more than 140,000. However, declining enrollment later caused closing several schools.

In July 1985, talks between the City of Torrance and TUSD broke down over the purchase of the 3.4-acre (1.4 ha) Greenwood School site, a closed school site. The final offer from TUSD was $1.875 million ($5612817.14 when accounting for inflation). The final offer from the city was $1.6 million ($4789603.96 when accounting for inflation). Later in 1985, to avoid legal action, the city proposed that if the district gives the site to the city while negotiations over the sales price occurred, the city government would give the district $1.6 million in a deposit and allow it to draw interest in that deposit. The city promised to pay the difference between the $1.6 million and the final purchase price in addition to the interest as long as the final purchase price did not exceed $1.875 million. TUSD had until November 1, 1985 to decide on whether to take the offer.

== Location ==
The district is in the South Bay region of southwestern Los Angeles County. The district's approximately 21 square miles (54 km^{2}) of territory includes all of the City of Torrance.

Bordering areas include Gardena and Redondo Beach to the north and west, Carson to the east, and the Palos Verdes Peninsula to the south.

== Curriculum and instruction ==
The district cut vocal musical instruction from the elementary school budget in the 1987-1988 school year to make up for a $1.4-million budget shortfall. For the 1988-1989 school year the district reinstated vocal musical instruction in elementary school.

As of 1986 the school district has Gifted and Talented Education (GATE) courses. For grades 3 through 12 one has to be in the 98th percentile of intelligence tests in order to participate. For the 1986-1987 year the percentile changed to 98 from 96.

== Schools ==
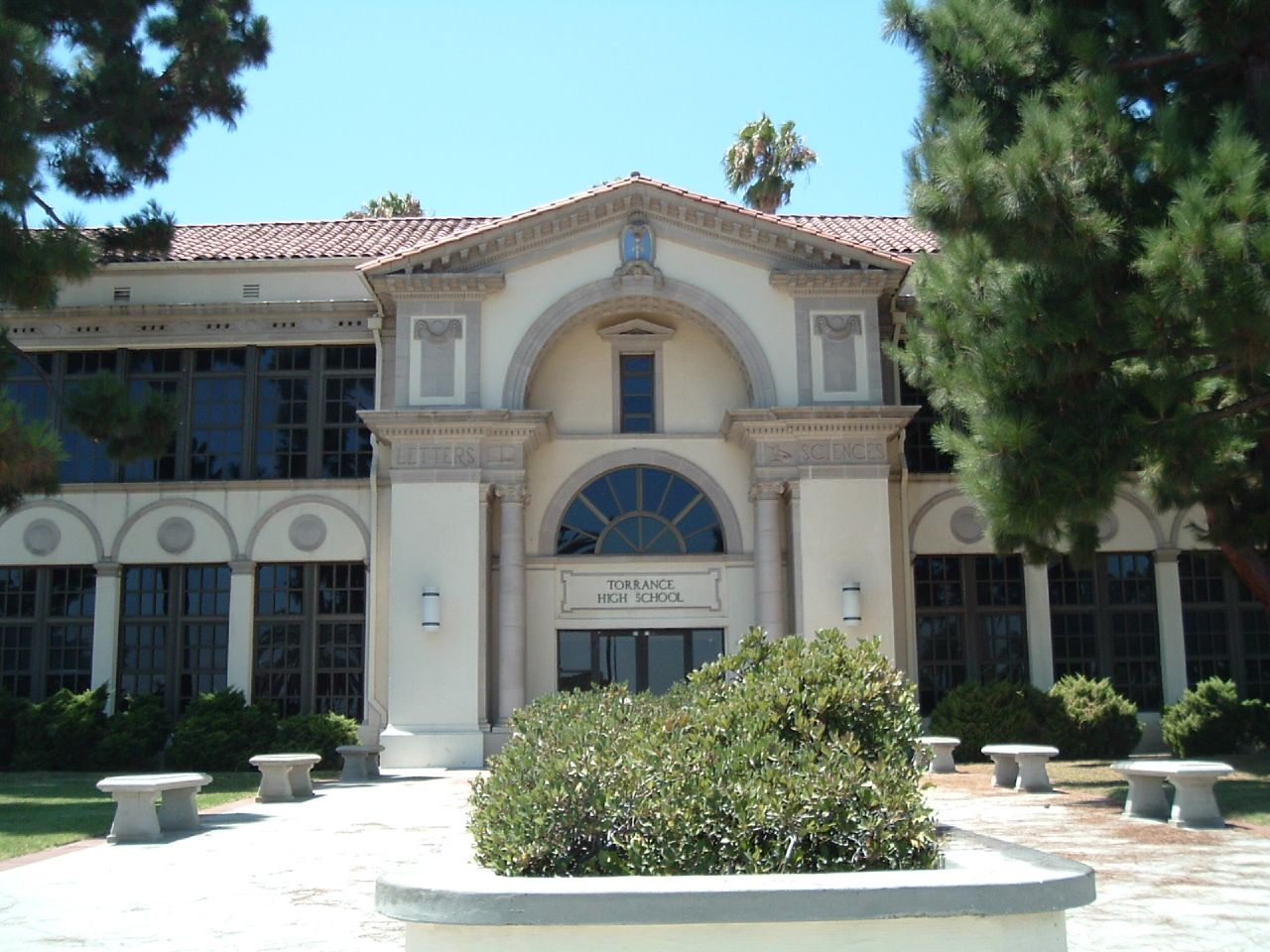
Torrance High School

The district has 19 elementary schools, 8 middle schools, 4 high schools, one continuation high school, one alternative high school, and three adult school campuses.

=== Adult Education ===
==== Torrance Adult School ====
- Hamilton Adult Center
- Griffith Adult Center
- Levy Adult Center

=== Secondary schools ===
==== High schools ====
- Torrance High School
- North High School
- South High School
- West High School
- Continuation: Kurt Shery High School
- Expulsion: Drevno Community Day School

==== Middle schools ====
- Calle Mayor Middle School
- Casimir Middle School
- J.H. Hull Middle School
- Jefferson Middle School
- Bert Lynn Middle School
- Madrona Middle School
- Magruder Middle School
- Richardson Middle School

=== Primary schools ===
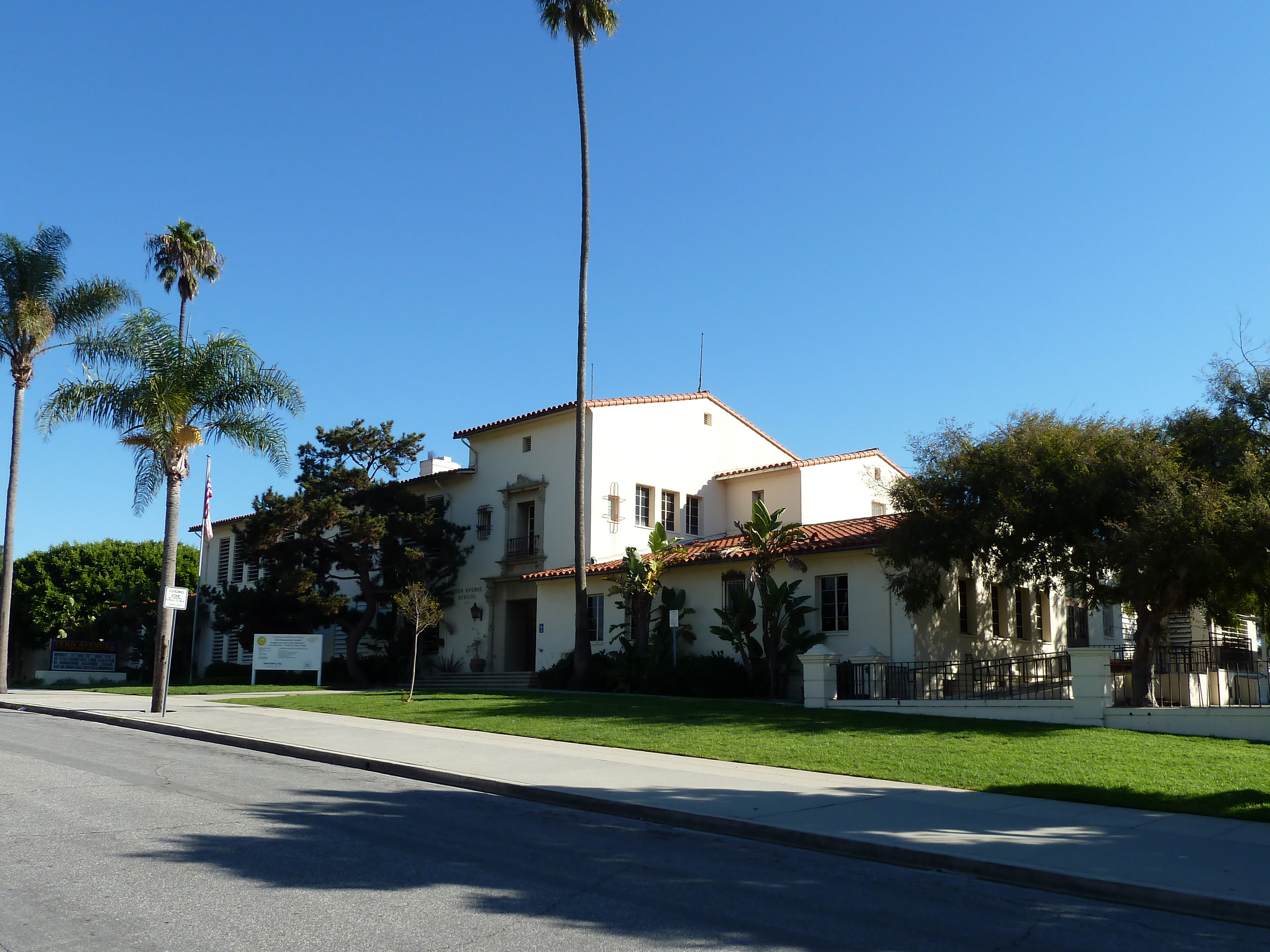
Fern Elementary School

- Adams Elementary School
- Anza Elementary School
- Arlington Elementary School
- Arnold Elementary School
- Carr Elementary School
- Edison Elementary School
- Fern Elementary School
- Hickory Elementary School
- Howard Wood Elementary School
- Lincoln Elementary School
- Riviera Elementary School
- Seaside Elementary School
- Torrance Elementary School (see former building)
- Towers Elementary School
- Victor Elementary School
- Walteria Elementary School
- Yukon Elementary School

== Former schools ==
Enrollment in the district dropped from more than 34,000 students in 1967 to a low of just under 19,000 in 1988 before beginning to rise again. Unlike neighboring districts, TUSD did not close any of its four high schools, but 12 elementary schools were shut between 1969 and 1984. Seven other elementary schools were repurposed into middle schools between 1970 and 1975 in an attempt to balance enrollments (J.H. Hull Middle School was purpose-built as a secondary facility in 1970, the last new campus to open in TUSD.)

- Crenshaw Elementary School (closed in 1972 and demolished for industrial buildings)
- Greenwood Elementary School (now used for city/district programs)
  - The property has 2.5 acres (1.0 ha) of space. In 1984 the school stopped operations. The Torrance government bought the facility in 1986. In 1988 the city council voted unanimously to make the property into Greenwood Park, with the building used for community purposes, including being the interim site of the senior center, and with parking space changed into grass, with two playgrounds. The city planned to spend $130,000 for phase I. In 1996 TUSD put some portable classrooms on Greenwood Park to relieve Fern Elementary. They remained in use until September 2012.
- Hamilton Elementary School (closed in 1974 and used as an adult education center)
- Hillside Elementary School (closed in 1976 and demolished for housing)
- Sam Levy Elementary School (closed in 1980; now used as a district programming center)
- Madison Elementary School (built as an interim school made up of modular structures; closed in 1969)
- Meadow Park Elementary School (closed in 1973 and demolished for housing)
- Parkway Elementary School
  - The school, on a 6.2-acre (2.5 ha) property, was located in the Hollywood Riviera section of Torrance. It closed in 1978 due to lack of enrollment. A Japanese group began using the campus in 1979. In 1980 the Lycée Français de Los Angeles bought the former Parkway School property, and this property became the Lycee's Torrance campus until it was sold to Manhattan Holding Co. in 1989. Its use as a school campus was scheduled to end after the Spring term of 1990.
- Perry Elementary School (closed in 1981 and demolished for housing)
- Sepulveda Elementary School (closed in 1979 and demolished for housing)
- Carl Steele Elementary School (closed in 1983 and demolished for housing)
- Grace Wright Elementary School (closed in 1979 and demolished for industrial buildings)
